= 2015–16 national figure skating championships =

- Type: National
- Season: 2015–16
- Previous: 2014–15
- Next: 2016–17

National figure skating championships of the 2015–16 season took place mostly between November 2015 and January 2016. Medals were awarded in the disciplines of men's singles, ladies' singles, pair skating, and ice dancing.

== National competitions ==
Code key
S – Senior event	J – Junior event	M – Men's singles	L – Ladies' singles	P – Pair skating	D – Ice dance

Color key

- National championships
- Other domestic competition

2015
Dates	Event	Type	Level	Disc.	Location	Ref.
August 3	Argentine Championships	Nationals	S/J	M/L	Buenos Aires, Argentina	
September 23–27	New Zealand Championships	Nationals	S/J	M/L/D	Auckland, New Zealand	
September 23–27	Belgian Championships	Nationals	S/J	M/L	Maaseik, Belgium	
October 8-10, 2015	Master's de Patinage	Other	S/J	All	Villard de Lans, France	
November 21–23	Japan Junior Championships	Nationals	Junior	M/L/D	Ibaraki, Japan	
November 27–29	Icelandic Championships	Nationals	S/J	L	Reykjavík, Iceland	
Nov. 28 – Dec. 4	Australian Championships	Nationals	S/J	All	Penrith, Australia	
December 1–2	Philippine Championships	Nationals	S/J	All	Manila, Philippines	
December 1–6	British Championships	Nationals	S/J	All	Sheffield, England	
December 2–6	Skate Canada Challenge	Other	S/J	All	Edmonton, AB, Canada	
December 9–10	Serbian Championships	Nationals	S/J	L	Belgrade, Serbia	
December 10–13	Swedish Championships	Nationals	S/J	M/L	Helsingborg, Sweden	
December 11–12	Swiss Championships	Nationals	S/J	All	Lausanne-Prilly, Switzerland	
December 11–13	Belarusian Championships	Nationals	Senior	All	Minsk, Belarus	
December 11–13	Danish Championships	Nationals	S/J	M/L/D	Tarnby, Denmark	
December 11–13	Estonian Championships	Nationals	S/J	M/L/D	Tallinn, Estonia	
December 12–13	German Championships	Nationals	Senior	All	Essen, Germany	
December 12–13	Latvian Championships	Nationals	S/J	M/L	Riga, Latvia	
December 12–13	Slovenian Championships	Nationals	S/J	M/L/D	Celje, Slovenia	
December 16–18	Austrian Championships	Nationals	S/J	All	Innsbruck, Austria	
December 16–19	Italian Championships	Nationals	S/J	All	Turin, Italy	
December 17–19	French Championships	Nationals	Senior	All	Épinal, France	
December 18–20	Finnish Championships	Nationals	S/J	M/L/D	Finland	
December 18–20	Ukrainian Championships	Nationals	Senior	All	Kyiv, Ukraine	
December 18–20	Four Nationals Championships	Nationals	S/J	All	Třinec, Czech Republic	
December 18–20	Bulgarian Championships	Nationals	S/J	M/L/D	Sofia, Bulgaria	
December 18–20	Turkish Championships	Nationals		All	İzmir, Turkey	
December 19–20	Spanish Championships	Nationals	S/J	All	San Sebastián, Spain	
December 23–27	Russian Championships	Nationals	Senior	All	Yekaterinburg, Russia	
December 24–27	Japan Championships	Nationals	S/J	All	Hokkaido, Japan	
December 26–27	Chinese Championships	Nationals	Senior	All	Harbin, China	

2016
Dates	Event	Type	Level	Disc.	Location	Ref.
January 6–10	German Junior Championships	Nationals	Junior	All	Berlin, Germany	
January 8–10	South Korean Championships	Nationals	S/J	All	Seoul, South Korea	
January 15–24	U.S. Championships	Nationals	S/J	All	Saint Paul, Minnesota, United States	
January 18–24	Canadian Championships	Nationals	S/J	All	Halifax, NS, Canada	
January 19–21	Ukrainian Junior Championships	Nationals	Junior	All	Kyiv, Ukraine	
January 21–23	Russian Junior Championships	Nationals	Junior	All	Chelyabinsk, Russia	
February 5–7	Norwegian Championships	Nationals	S/J	M/L	Bergen, Norway	
February 26–28	French Junior Championships	Nationals	Junior		Poitiers, France	
March 5–6	Dutch Championships	Nationals	S/J	M/L	The Hague, Netherlands	
March 19–20	Croatian Championships	Nationals	S/J	M/L	Zagreb, Croatia	
April 12–13	Hong Kong Championships	Nationals	S/J	All	Hong Kong, China	
April 15–16	Malaysian Championships	Nationals	S/J	M/L	Kuala Lumpur, Malaysia	
May 8-10	South African Championships	Nationals	S/J	M/L	Cape Town, South Africa	
May 28–29	Cyprus Championships	Nationals	Junior	M/L	Limassol, Cyprus	

== Senior medalists ==
=== Men's singles ===
Championships	Gold	Silver	Bronze	Ref.
Argentina	Denis Margalik	No other competitors		
Australia	Brendan Kerry	Andrew Dodds	Jordan Dodds	
Austria	Mario-Rafael Ionian	Manuel Koll	Albert Mück	
Belgium	Jorik Hendrickx	No other competitors		
Belarus	Aliaksei Mialiokhin	Pavel Ignatenko	Yakau Zenko	
Bulgaria	Yasen Petkov	No other competitors		
Canada	Patrick Chan	Liam Firus	Kevin Reynolds	
China	Jin Boyang	Song Nan	Zang Wenbo	
Czech Republic	Michal Březina	Jiří Bělohradský	Petr Kotlařík	
Denmark	Keiran Richard Araza	No other competitors		
Estonia	Daniil Zurav	Aleksandr Selevko	Jegor Zelenjak	
Finland	Valtter Virtanen	Roman Galay	Matthias Versluis	
France	Chafik Besseghier	Florent Amodio	Simon Hocquaux	
Germany	Franz Streubel	Paul Fentz	Niko Ulanovsky	
(United Kingdom) Great Britain	Phillip Harris	Peter-James Hallam	Jamie Wright	
Hong Kong	Leslie Man Cheuk Ip	Harry Hau Yin Lee	Kwun Hung Leung	
Hungary	Alexander Maszljanko	Alexander Borovoj	Máté Böröcz	
Italy	Ivan Righini	Matteo Rizzo	Maurizio Zandron	
Japan	Yuzuru Hanyu	Shoma Uno	Takahito Mura	
Malaysia	Julian Zhi Jie Yee	Kai Xiang Chew	No other competitors	
Netherlands	Thomas Kennes	Michel Tsiba	Florian Gostelie	
Norway	Sondre Oddvoll Bøe	No other competitors		
Poland	Igor Reznichenko	Patrick Myzyk	Krzysztof Gała	
Russia	Maxim Kovtun	Mikhail Kolyada	Alexander Petrov	
Slovakia	Michael Neuman	Jakub Kršňák	Marco Klepoch	
Slovenia	David Kranjec	No other competitors		
South Africa	Johann Wilkinson	No other competitors		
South Korea	Lee June-hyoung	Kim Jin-seo	Cha Jun-hwan	
Spain	Javier Fernández	Felipe Montoya	Javier Raya	
Sweden	Ondrej Spiegl	Illya Solomin	Trevor Bergqvist	
Switzerland	Stéphane Walker	Nicola Todeschini	Nicolas Dubois	
Turkey	Engin Ali Artan	Ali Demirboğa	Burak Demirboğa	
Ukraine	Ivan Pavlov	Yaroslav Paniot	Mykhailo Medunytsya	
United States	Adam Rippon	Max Aaron	Nathan Chen	

=== Ladies' singles ===
Championships	Gold	Silver	Bronze	Ref.
Argentina	Anhelina Bosko	Maria Andrea An	No other competitors	
Australia	Kailani Craine	Brooklee Han	Chantelle Kerry	
Austria	Kerstin Frank	Belinda Schönberger	Lara Nikola Roth	
Belarus	Janina Makeenka	Daria Batura	Mariya Saldakaeva	
Bulgaria	Hristina Vassileva	Daniela Stoeva	Elizaveta Makarova	
Canada	Alaine Chartrand	Gabrielle Daleman	Kaetlyn Osmond	
China	Zhao Ziquan	Li Xiangning	Jiao Yunya	
Czech Republic	Eliška Březinová	Michaela Lucie Hanzlíková	Anna Dušková	
Denmark	Daria Podtelejnikova	No other competitors		
Estonia	Helery Hälvin	Elizaveta Leonova	Kristina Škuleta-Gromova	
Finland	Anni Järvenpää	Jenni Saarinen	Juulia Turkkila	
France	Maé-Bérénice Méité	Laurine Lecavelier	Alizée Crozet	
Germany	Lutricia Bock	Nathalie Weinzierl	Nicole Schott	
(United Kingdom) Great Britain	Danielle Harrison	Zoe Wilkinson	Nina Povey	
Hungary	Ivett Tóth	Fruzsina Medgyesi	Júlia Bátori	
Italy	Giada Russo	Roberta Rodeghiero	Sara Casella	
Japan	Satoko Miyahara	Wakaba Higuchi	Mao Asada	
Netherlands	Niki Wories	Mila Morelissen	Nicolien van Beek	
New Zealand	Allie Rout	Sarah MacGibbon	No other competitors	
Norway	Anne Line Gjersem	Camilla Gjersem	Jemima Rasmuss	
Philippines	Frances Untalan	Samantha Cabiles	Shayanne Casapao	
Poland	Aleksandra Rudolf	Agnieszka Rejment	Colette Kaminski	
Russia	Evgenia Medvedeva	Elena Radionova	Anna Pogorilaya	
Serbia	Antonina Dubinina	Jovana Tomović	No other competitors	
Slovakia	Nicole Rajičová	Alexandra Hagarová	Nina Letenayová	
Slovenia	Daša Grm	Naja Ferkov	Urša Krušec	
South Africa	Nadia Geldenhuys	No other competitors		
South Korea	You Young	Choi Da-bin	Lim Eun-soo	
Spain	Sonia Lafuente	Marta García	No other competitors	
Sweden	Joshi Helgesson	Isabelle Olsson	Matilda Algotsson	
Switzerland	Tanja Odermatt	Shaline Rüegger	Yasmine Yamada	
Turkey	Birce Atabey	Sıla Saygı	Sinem Kuyucu	
Ukraine	Anastasia Hozhva	Anna Khnychenkova	Daria Hozhva	
United States	Gracie Gold	Polina Edmunds	Ashley Wagner	

=== Pairs ===
Championships	Gold	Silver	Bronze	Ref.
Australia	Paris Stephens; Matthew Dodds	No other competitors		
Austria	Miriam Ziegler; Severin Kiefer	No other competitors		
Belarus	Tatiana Danilova; Mikalai Kamianchuk	No other competitors		
Canada	Meagan Duhamel; Eric Radford	Julianne Séguin; Charlie Bilodeau	Lubov Iliushechkina; Dylan Moscovitch	
China	Wang Xuehan; Wang Lei	Sui Jiaying; Yang Yongchao	Zhao Ying; Jie Zhong	
France	Vanessa James; Morgan Ciprès	Camille Mendoza; Pavel Kovalev	No other competitors	
(United Kingdom) Great Britain	Amani Fancy; Christopher Boyadji	No other competitors		
Germany	Aliona Savchenko; Bruno Massot	Mari Vartmann; Ruben Blommaert	Minerva-Fabienne Hase; Nolan Seegert	
Hungary	Anna Marie Pearce; Mark Magyar	No other competitors		
Italy	Nicole Della Monica; Matteo Guarise	Valentina Marchei; Ondřej Hotárek	Bianca Manacorda; Niccolò Macii	
Japan	Sumire Suto; Francis Boudreau-Audet	Marin Ono; Wesley Killing	Miu Suzaki; Ryuichi Kihara	
Russia	Tatiana Volosozhar; Maxim Trankov	Yuko Kavaguti; Alexander Smirnov	Evgenia Tarasova; Vladimir Morozov	
South Korea	Ji Min-ji; Themistocles Leftheris	No other competitors		
Spain	Marcelina Lech; Aritz Maestu	No other competitors		
Switzerland	Alexandra Herbríková; Nicolas Roulet	Ioulia Chtchetinina; Noah Scherer	No other competitors	
Turkey	Çağla Demirsal; Berk Akalın	No other competitors		
Ukraine	Renata Ohanesian; Mark Bardei	Anastasia Pobizhenko; Dmytro Sharpar	No other competitors	
United States	Tarah Kayne; Daniel O'Shea	Alexa Scimeca; Chris Knierim	Marissa Castelli; Mervin Tran	

=== Ice dance ===
Championships	Gold	Silver	Bronze	Ref.
Australia	Emily Pike; Patrick Adderley	No other competitors		
Austria	Barbora Silná; Juri Kurakin	No other competitors		
Belarus	Viktoria Kavaliova; Yurii Bieliaiev	No other competitors		
Canada	Kaitlyn Weaver; Andrew Poje	Piper Gilles; Paul Poirier	Élisabeth Paradis; François-Xavier Ouellette	
China	Zhao Yue; Zheng Xun	Chen Hong; Zhao Yan	Zhang Yiyi; Wu Nan	
Estonia	Marina Elias; Denis Koreline	No other competitors		
Finland	Cecilia Törn; Jussiville Partanen	Olesia Karmi; Max Lindholm	No other competitors	
France	Gabriella Papadakis; Guillaume Cizeron	Lorenza Alessandrini; Pierre Souquet	Péroline Ojardias; Michael Bramante	
Germany	Kavita Lorenz; Panagiotis Polizoakis	Katharina Müller; Tim Dieck	Aurelija Ippolito; Bennet Preiss	
(United Kingdom) Great Britain	Penny Coomes; Nicholas Buckland	Carter Jones; Richard Sharpe	Eleanor Hirst; Jordan Barrett	
Italy	Anna Cappellini; Luca Lanotte	Charlène Guignard; Marco Fabbri	Misato Komatsubara; Andrea Fabbri	
Japan	Kana Muramoto; Chris Reed	Emi Hirai; Marien de la Asuncion	Ibuki Mori; Kentaro Suzuki	
Poland	Natalia Kaliszek; Maksym Spodyriev	No other competitors		
Russia	Ekaterina Bobrova; Dmitri Soloviev	Victoria Sinitsina; Nikita Katsalapov	Alexandra Stepanova; Ivan Bukin	
Slovakia	Federica Testa; Lukáš Csölley	No other competitors		
South Korea	Rebeka Kim; Kirill Minov	Min Yura; Alexander Gamelin	Lee Ho-jung; Richard Kang-in Kam	
Switzerland	Katarina Paice; Iurii Ieremenko	No other competitors		
Ukraine	Valeria Haistruk; Oleksiy Oliynyk	Anzhelika Yurchenko; Volodymyr Byelikov	Maria Holubtsova; Kyryl Bielobrov	
United States	Maia Shibutani; Alex Shibutani	Madison Chock; Evan Bates	Madison Hubbell; Zachary Donohue	

== Junior medalists ==
=== Men's singles ===
Championships	Gold	Silver	Bronze	Ref.
Australia	James Min	Charlton Doherty	Darian Kaptich	
Austria	Luc Maierhofer	Johannes Maierhofer	Livio Mayr	
Belgium	Timothée Manand	Bob Rasschaert	No other competitors	
Belarus	Yakau Zenko	Anton Karpuk	Evgeni Puzanov	
Bulgaria	Nikola Zlatanov	No other competitors		
Canada	Joseph Phan	Edrian Paul Celestino	Christian Reekie	
Czech Republic	Jiří Bělohradský	Petr Kotlařík	Matyáš Bělohradský	
Denmark	Daniel Tsion	Nikolaj Mølgaard Pedersen	No other competitors	
Estonia	Daniel Albert Naurits	Aleksandr Selevko	Daniil Žurav	
Finland	Kasperi Riihimäki	Lauri Lankila	No other competitors	
France	Kévin Aymoz	Adrien Tesson	Luc Economides	
Germany	Catalin Dimitrescu	Dave Kötting	Kai Jagoda	
(United Kingdom) Great Britain	Josh Brown	Hugh Brabyn-Jones	Ruaridh Fisher	
Hong Kong	Harrison Wong Jon-yen	No other competitors		
Italy	Daniel Grassl	Nik Folini	Paolo Balestri	
Japan	Sōta Yamamoto	Kazuki Tomono	Daichi Miyata	
Malaysia	Nicholas Zhi Ming Tan	Bryan Christopher Tan	No other competitors	
Netherlands	Erik Hruszowy	Marco van den Hoed	No other competitors	
New Zealand	Michael Durham	Brian Lee	No other competitors	
Philippines	Jules Alpe	No other competitors		
Poland	Michał Woźniak	Eryk Matysiak	Sebastian Szymłowski	
Russia	Dmitri Aliev	Alexander Samarin	Roman Savosin	
Slovakia	Marco Klepoch	Jakub Kršňák	Simon Fukas	
South Africa	Matthew Samuels	Evan Wrensch	No other competitors	
South Korea	Kim Sang-woo	Kim Han-gil	Kim Tae-hyun	
Spain	Héctor Alonso	Tòn Cónsul	Aleix Gabara	
Sweden	Nikolaj Majorov	John-Olof Hallman	Mikael Nordebäck	
Switzerland	Lukas Britschgi	Tim Huber	Micha Steffen	
Turkey	Başar Oktar	Mehmet Çakır	Efe Görkmen	
Ukraine	Yaroslav Paniot	Yan Tkalich	Mihail Medunitsa	
United States	Tomoki Hiwatashi	Kevin Shum	Alexei Krasnozhon	

=== Ladies' singles ===
Championships	Gold	Silver	Bronze	Ref.
Argentina	Florencia Lin	Ivanna Nai Fovino	No other competitors	
Australia	Kailani Craine	Amelia Jackson	Katie Pasfield	
Austria	Alisa Stomakhina	Nathalie Klotz	Violette Ivanoff	
Belarus	Alina Suponenko	Anastasia Bozhenkova	Hanna Paroshina	
Belgium	Charlotte Van Der Sarren	Lisa Van Genck	Loïs Arickx	
Bulgaria	Alexandra Feigin	Simona Gospodinova	Simona Arnaudova	
Canada	Sarah Tamura	Alicia Pineault	Megan Yim	
Czech Republic	Elizaveta Ukolova	Michaela Lucie Hanzlíková	Klára Světlíková	
Denmark	Leonora Colmor Jepsen	Emma Frida Andersen	Vanessa Sevidova	
Estonia	Kristina Škuleta-Gromova	Jelizaveta Leonova	Calista Krass	
Finland	Sallianna Öztürk	Joanna Kallela	Emma Niemi	
France	Alizée Crozet	Julie Froetscher	Élodie Eudine	
Germany	Kristina Isaev	Annika Hocke	Alissa Scheidt	
(United Kingdom) Great Britain	Emily Hayward	Lana Bagen	Anna Litvinenko	
Hong Kong	Yi Christy Leung	Joanna So	Kwong Hiu Ching	
Italy	Lucrezia Gennaro	Alessia Tornaghi	Lara Naki Gutmann	
Japan	Wakaba Higuchi	Yuna Shiraiwa	Yuhana Yokoi	
Malaysia	Aina Sorfina Mohd Aminuddin	Amirah Azfariena Azhari	Aneeta Lingam	
Netherlands	Kyarha van Tiel	Linden van Bemmel	Daya Aerts	
New Zealand	Brooke Tamepo	Tracy Danbrook	Christina Floka	
Norway	Ellen Yu	Juni Marie Benjaminsen	Madeleine Lidholm Torgersen	
Poland	Elżbieta Gabryszak	Oliwia Rzepiel	Aleksandra Rudolf	
Russia	Polina Tsurskaya	Maria Sotskova	Alisa Fedichkina	
Serbia	Andjela Miljegvic	Zona Apostolovic	Anja Sainovic	
Slovakia	Alexandra Hagarová	Bronislava Dobiášová	Nina Letenayová	
Slovenia	Monika Peterka	Nina Polšak	Maruša Udrih	
South Africa	Kathryn Winstanley	Courtney Kuhn	Abigail Samuels	
South Korea	Kam Yun-kyung	Jeon Su-been	Kim Na-yeong	
Spain	Maeva Gallarda	Valentina Matos	Idoia Fuentes	
Sweden	Anastasia Schneider	Anita Östlund	Cassandra Johansson	
Switzerland	Camille Chervet	Tina Leuenberger	Yoonmi Lehmann	
Turkey	Elif Erdem	İlayda Bayar	Zeynep Dilruba Sanoğlu	
Ukraine	Anastasia Gozhva	Anastasiia Arkhipova	Kim Cheremsky	
United States	Emily Chan	Vivian Le	Megan Wessenberg	

=== Pairs ===
Championships	Gold	Silver	Bronze	Ref.
Australia	Jessica Rotondo; Ryan Dodds	No other competitors		
Canada	Hope McLean; Trennt Michaud	Bryn Hoffman; Bryce Chudak	Allison Eby; Brett Varley	
Germany	Minori Yuge; Jannis Bronisefski	No other competitors		
(United Kingdom) Great Britain	Chloe Curtin; Steven Adcock	Harriet Beatson; Jack Newberry	No other competitors	
Italy	Irma Angela Caldara; Edoardo Caputo	No other competitors		
Japan	Riku Miura; Shoya Ichihashi	Yoshino Sekiguchi; Shunsuke Sekiguchi	No other competitors	
Russia	Anastasia Mishina; Vladislav Mirzoev	Amina Atakhanova; Ilia Spiridonov	Ekaterina Borisova; Dmitry Sopot	
South Korea	Kim Su-yeon; Kim Hyung-tae	No other competitors		
Spain	Dorota Broda; Pedro Betegón	No other competitors		
Ukraine	Renata Oganesian; Mark Bardei	Anastasiia Smirnova; Artem Darenskyi	Anastasiya Pobizhenko; Dmytro Sharpar	
United States	Joy Weinberg; Maximiliano Fernandez	Lindsay Weinstein; Jacob Simon	Meiryla Findley; Austin Hale	

=== Ice dance ===
Championships	Gold	Silver	Bronze	Ref.
Australia	Matilda Friend; William Badaoui	Jessica Palfreyman; Charlton Doherty	Courtney Tyerman; Alex Anstey	
Austria	Elizaveta Orlova; Stephano Schuster	No other competitors		
Belarus	Maria Oleynik; Yuri Hulitski	Emilia Kolleganova; Vladislav Polhovskij	Polina Mishchanchuk; Vladimir Zaitsev	
Canada	Mackenzie Bent; Dmitre Razgulajevs	Marjorie Lajoie; Zachary Lagha	Melinda Meng; Andrew Meng	
Czech Republic	Nicole Kuzmichová; Alexandr Sinicyn	No other competitors		
Estonia	Viktoria Semenjuk; Artur Gruzdev	Katerina Bunina; German Frolov	No other competitors	
Finland	Kaisa Ukkonen; Antonio Viitanen	Viola Kumpulainen; Kaius Kumpulainen	No other competitors	
France	Marie-Jade Lauriault; Romain Le Gac	Angélique Abachkina; Louis Thauron	Sarah-Marine Rouffanche; Geoffrey Brissaud	
Germany	Ria Schwendinger; Valentin Wunderlich	Charise Matthaei; Maximilian Pfisterer	Sandrine Hofstetter; Benjamin Steffan	
(United Kingdom) Great Britain	Gwenneth Sletten; Elliot Verburg	Ekaterina Fedyushchenko; Lucas Kitteridge	Mia-Rose Jowitt; Peter Beaumont	
Hungary	Kimberly Wei; Illiász Fourati	Villő Márton; Danyil Semko	Hanna Jakucs; Dániel Illés	
Italy	Sara Ghislandi; Giona Terzo Ortenzi	Francesca Righi; Pietro Papetti	Carolina Portesi Peroni; Alessio Galli	
Japan	Rikako Fukase; Aru Tateno	Kumiko Maeda; Junya Watanabe	Himesato Hirayama; Kenta Azuma	
Poland	Oleksandra Borysova; Cezary Zawadzki	Jenna Hertenstein; Damian Bińkowski	Elisa Saez; Yann Thayalan	
Russia	Alla Loboda; Pavel Drozd	Betina Popova; Yuri Vlasenko	Anastasia Shpilevaya; Grigory Smirnov	
Slovenia	Mina Švajger; Michael Chrastecky	No other competitors		
Spain	Amelie Giraudon; Jaime García	No other competitors		
Switzerland	Valentina Schär; Carlo Röthlisberger	Marie-Louise Leupold; Christof Steger	No other competitors	
Ukraine	Anzhelika Yurchenko; Volodymyr Byelikov	Mariia Holubtsova; Kyryl Bielobrov	Darya Popova; Volodymyr Nakisko	
United States	Lorraine McNamara; Quinn Carpenter	Rachel Parsons; Michael Parsons	Elliana Pogrebinsky; Alex Benoit	
