= 2018 Four Nationals Figure Skating Championships =

Figure skating competition

2018 Four National Figure Skating Championships
- Type: National championships
- Date: 14–16 December 2017
- Season: 2017–18
- Location: Košice, Slovakia
- Host: Slovak Figure Skating Association
- Previous: 2017 Four National Championships
- Next: 2019 Four National Championships

The 2018 Four National Figure Skating Championships included the Czech Republic, Hungary, Poland, and Slovakia. It took place 14–16 December 2017 in Košice, Slovakia. The results were split by country; the three highest-placing skaters from each country formed their national podiums in men's singles, ladies' singles, and ice dance. The results were among the criteria used to determine international assignments.

== Medal summary ==
=== Czech Republic ===
| Discipline | Gold | Silver | Bronze |
|---|---|---|---|
| Men | Jiří Bělohradský | Matyáš Bělohradský | Petr Kotlařík |
| Ladies | Eliška Březinová | Daniela Ko | Michaela Lucie Hanzlíková |
| Ice dance | Cortney Mansour / Michal Češka | — | |

=== Hungary ===
| Discipline | Gold | Silver | Bronze |
|---|---|---|---|
| Men | Alexander Maszljanko | Alexander Borovoj | Máté Böröcz |
| Ladies | Fruzsina Medgyesi | Ivett Tóth | Dária Jakab |
| Ice dance | Anna Yanovskaya / Ádám Lukács | — | |

=== Poland ===
| Discipline | Gold | Silver | Bronze |
|---|---|---|---|
| Men | Ihor Reznichenko | Krzysztof Gała | Olgierd Febbi |
| Ladies | Elżbieta Gabryszak | Oliwia Rzepiel | Colette Coco Kaminski |
| Ice dance | Natalia Kaliszek / Maksym Spodyriev | Justyna Plutowska / Jérémie Flemin | Anastasia Polibina / Radosław Barszczak |

=== Slovakia ===
| Discipline | Gold | Silver | Bronze |
|---|---|---|---|
| Men | Michael Neuman | Jakub Kršňák | Marco Klepoch |
| Ladies | Silvia Hugec | Nina Letenayová | Mária Sofia Pucherová |
| Ice dance | Lucie Myslivečková / Lukáš Csölley | — | |
