= 2016 British Figure Skating Championships =

Figure skating competition

- Type: National championship
- Date: 1 – 6 December 2015
- Season: 2015–16
- Location: Sheffield
- Host: NISA
- Venue: IceSheffield

Champions
- Men's singles: Phillip Harris (S); Josh Brown (J)
- Ladies' singles: Danielle Harrison (S); Emily Hayward (J)
- Pairs: Amani Fancy / Christopher Boyadji (S); Chloe Curtin / Steven Adcock (J)
- Ice dance: Penny Coomes / Nicholas Buckland (S); Gwenneth Sletten / Elliot Verburg (J)
- Previous: 2015 British Championships
- Next: 2017 British Championships

The 2016 British Figure Skating Championships were held from 1–6 December 2015 in Sheffield. Medals were awarded in the disciplines of men's singles, ladies' singles, pair skating, and ice dance at the senior, junior, and novice levels. The results were among the criteria used to determine international assignments.

== Medallists ==
=== Senior ===
Discipline	Gold	Silver	Bronze
Men	Phillip Harris	Peter James Hallam	Jamie Wright
Ladies	Danielle Harrison	Zoe Wilkinson	Nina Povey
Pairs	Amani Fancy / Christopher Boyadji	No other competitors	
Ice dance	Penny Coomes / Nicholas Buckland	Carter Jones / Richard Sharpe	Eleanor Hirst / Jordan Barrett

=== Junior ===
Discipline	Gold	Silver	Bronze
Men	Josh Brown	Hugh Brabyn-Jones	Ruaridh Fisher
Ladies	Emily Hayward	Lana Bagen	Anna Litvinenko
Pairs	Chloe Curtin / Steven Adcock	Harriet Beatson / Jack Newberry	Alice Gavin / Dominic Barter
Ice dance	Gwenneth Sletten / Elliot Verburg	Ekaterina Fedyushchenko / Lucas Kitteridge	Mia-Rose Jowitt / Peter Beaumont

== Senior results ==
=== Senior men ===
Rank	Name	Club	Total points	SP		FS	
1	Phillip Harris	COV	197.01	1	65.65	1	131.36
2	Peter James Hallam	SHE	176.91	2	58.46	2	118.45
3	Jamie Wright	EK	156.30	3	55.94	3	100.36
4	Charlie Parry-Evans	NOT	149.12	4	50.39	4	98.73
5	Lewis Gibson	MAG	146.57	5	48.60	5	97.97

=== Senior ladies ===
Rank	Name	Club	Total points	SP		FS	
1	Danielle Harrison	DDE	125.46	2	39.09	2	86.37
2	Zoe Wilkinson	SWI	125.37	3	38.87	1	86.50
3	Nina Povey	SOL	123.81	1	42.67	3	81.14
4	Karly Robertson	DDE	115.30	6	35.30	4	80.00
5	Natasha McKay	DDE	105.29	8	34.48	5	70.81
6	Michelle Callison	DDE	103.05	4	36.38	6	66.67
7	Katie Powell	NISA	102.25	5	36.03	7	66.22
8	Rowena MacKessack-Leitch	MOR	99.99	7	34.91	8	65.08
9	Lucy-Anne Walker	BRA	93.33	9	34.34	10	58.99
10	Bryony Corrigan-Rattray	HUL	90.68	11	30.70	9	59.98
11	Anastasia Vaipan-Law	DDE	89.49	10	30.89	11	58.60
12	Deborah Bell	OXF	72.47	12	27.04	12	45.43

=== Senior pairs ===
Rank	Name	Club	Total points	SP		FS	
1	Amani Fancy / Christopher Boyadji	NISA	151.52	1	54.26	1	97.26

=== Senior ice dance ===
Rank	Name	Club	Total points	SD		FD	
1	Penny Coomes / Nicholas Buckland	NOT	173.88	1	66.48	1	107.40
2	Carter Jones / Richard Sharpe	NISA	137.62	2	54.12	2	83.50
3	Eleanor Hirst / Jordan Barrett	SLO	114.72	3	43.32	3	71.40
4	Olivia Dufour / Luke Russell	NISA	96.70	4	36.57	4	60.13

== International team selections ==
=== World Championships ===
The 2016 World Figure Skating Championships were held in Boston, United States from 28 March–3 April 2016.

	Men	Ladies	Ice dance
1	Phillip Harris	Kristen Spours	Penny Coomes / Nicholas Buckland

=== World Junior Championships ===
The 2016 World Junior Figure Skating Championships were held in Debrecen, Hungary from 14 to 20 March 2016.

	Men	Ladies	Pairs	Ice dance
1	Josh Brown	Danielle Harrison	Chloe Curtin / Steven Adcock	Ekaterina Fedyushchenko / Lucas Kitteridge
