= 2017 Four Nationals Figure Skating Championships =

Figure skating competition

2017 Four National Figure Skating Championships
- Type: National championships
- Date: December 16 – 17, 2016
- Season: 2016–17
- Location: Katowice, Poland
- Host: Polish Figure Skating Association
- Venue: Spodek
- Previous: 2016 Four National Championships
- Next: 2018 Four National Championships

The 2017 Four National Figure Skating Championships included the Czech Republic, Slovakia, Poland, and Hungary. The event was held in December 2016 at the Spodek in Katowice, Poland. Skaters competed in the disciplines of men's singles, ladies' singles, and ice dancing.

The results were split by country; the three highest-placing skaters from each country formed their national podiums. The results were among the criteria used to determine international assignments. It was the ninth consecutive season that the Czech Republic, Slovakia, and Poland held their national championships together and the fourth season that Hungary participated.

== Medals summary ==
=== Czech Republic ===
Discipline	Gold	Silver	Bronze
Men	Jiří Bělohradský	Matyáš Bělohradský	Tomáš Kupka
Ladies	Michaela Lucie Hanzlíková	Eliška Březinová	Natálie Kratěnová
Ice dancing	Cortney Mansour / Michal Češka	Nicole Kuzmich / Alexandr Sinicyn	—

=== Slovakia ===
Discipline	Gold	Silver	Bronze
Men	Jakub Kršňák	Michael Neuman	Marco Klepoch
Ladies	Nicole Rajičová	Bronislava Dobiášová	Alexandra Hagarová
Ice dancing	Lucie Myslivečková / Lukáš Csölley	—	

=== Poland ===
Discipline	Gold	Silver	Bronze
Men	Krzysztof Gała	Ihor Reznichenko	Ryszard Gurtler
Ladies	Elżbieta Gabryszak	Agnieszka Rejment	Coco Colette Kaminski
Ice dancing	Natalia Kaliszek / Maksym Spodyriev	—	

=== Hungary ===
Discipline	Gold	Silver	Bronze
Men	Alexander Borovoj	András Csernoch	—
Ladies	Ivett Tóth	Júlia Bátori	Eszter Szombathelyi

== Senior results ==
=== Men ===
Michal Březina, ranked first in the short program, withdrew after injuring his arm during the free skating.

Rank	Name	Nation	Total points	SP		FS	
1	Jiří Bělohradský	Czech Republic	182.79	5	58.10	1	124.69
2	Krzysztof Gała	Poland	180.97	2	66.91	4	114.06
3	Ihor Reznichenko	Poland	180.54	3	61.92	2	118.62
4	Matyáš Bělohradský	Czech Republic	171.95	8	55.82	3	116.13
5	Tomáš Kupka	Czech Republic	162.66	9	54.89	5	107.77
6	Jan Kurník	Czech Republic	158.33	4	58.34	6	99.99
7	Ryszard Gurtler	Poland	149.85	12	50.22	7	99.63
8	Alexander Borovoj	Hungary	144.56	10	51.05	9	93.51
9	Jakub Kršňák	Slovakia	142.67	11	50.53	10	92.14
10	Patrick Myzyk	Poland	152,67	6	58.05	12	84.62
11	Łukasz Kędzierski	Poland	142.63	13	46.64	8	95.99
12	Michael Neuman	Slovakia	134.09	14	46.21	11	87.88
13	Eryk Matysiak	Poland	122.67	17	43.29	13	79.38
14	András Csernoch	Hungary	119.97	15	45.88	15	74.09
15	Kamil Peteja	Poland	115.49	19	38.48	14	77.01
16	Michał Woźniak	Poland	115.07	16	44.69	16	70.38
17	Marco Klepoch	Slovakia	109.60	18	39.45	17	70.15
18	Andrzej Siciński	Poland	105.41	20	37.10	18	68.31
WD	Michal Březina	Czech Republic		1	73.61		

=== Ladies ===
Rank	Name	Nation	Total points	SP		FS	
1	Ivett Tóth	Hungary	175.70	1	61.36	1	114.34
2	Nicole Rajičová	Slovakia	146.62	3	52.80	2	93.82
3	Michaela Lucie Hanzlíková	Czech Republic	146.46	2	53.19	3	93.27
4	Eliška Březinová	Czech Republic	139.12	4	50.91	4	88.21
5	Júlia Bátori	Hungary	116.20	5	42.93	7	73.27
6	Bronislava Dobiášová	Slovakia	115.39	6	39.80	6	75.59
7	Natálie Kratěnová	Czech Republic	115.31	8	37.78	5	77.53
8	Elżbieta Gabryszak	Poland	107.90	7	37.79	9	70.11
9	Agnieszka Rejment	Poland	103.65	12	33.10	8	70.55
10	Aneta Janiczková	Czech Republic	102.82	11	35.56	11	67.26
11	Alexandra Hagarová	Slovakia	100.98	13	31.63	10	69.35
12	Coco Colette Kaminski	Poland	100.09	9	36.85	12	63.24
13	Nina Letenayová	Slovakia	91.24	16	29.38	13	61.86
14	Eszter Szombathelyi	Hungary	87.36	14	30.68	14	56.68
15	Oliwia Rzepiel	Poland	85.13	15	29.94	16	55.19
16	Miroslava Hriňáková	Slovakia	81.70	17	26.45	15	55.25
17	Lívia Lörinčíková	Slovakia	76.47	18	24.00	17	52.47
WD	Elizaveta Ukolova	Czech Republic		10	36.58		

=== Ice dancing ===
Plutowska / Flemin withdrew after the short dance due to a back hernia.

Rank	Name	Nation	Total points	SD		FD	
1	Natalia Kaliszek / Maksym Spodyriev	Poland	154.24	1	60.55	1	93.69
2	Lucie Myslivečková / Lukáš Csölley	Slovakia	149.28	2	59.65	2	89.63
3	Cortney Mansour / Michal Češka	Czech Republic	141.95	3	52.62	3	89.33
4	Nicole Kuzmich / Alexandr Sinicyn	Czech Republic	132.15	4	49.13	4	83.02
WD	Justyna Plutowska / Jérémie Flemin	Poland		5	48.30		
