= Michaela Lucie Hanzlíková =

Czech figure skater (born 1999)

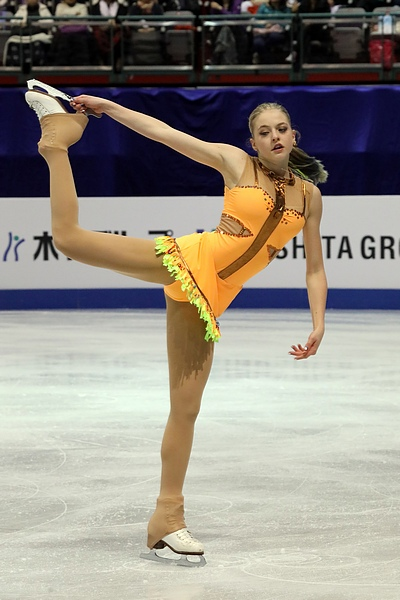

Personal information
- Born: 29 October 1999 (age 26) Karlovy Vary, Czech Republic
- Home town: Ostrov (Karlovy Vary District)
- Height: 1.63 m (5 ft 4 in)

Figure skating career
- Country: Czech Republic
- Coach: Monika Škorničková
- Skating club: SKK Karlovy Vary
- Began skating: 2008
- Retired: 2019

Medal record
Czech Championships
Gold medal – first place	2017 Katowice	Singles
Silver medal – second place	2016 Třinec	Singles
Bronze medal – third place	2018 Košice	Singles

Michaela Lucie Hanzlíková (born 29 October 1999) is a Czech figure skater. She is the 2017 Czech national champion and has competed in the final segment at two ISU Championships.

== Personal life ==
Hanzlíková was born on 29 October 1999 in Karlovy Vary, Czech Republic. She has two younger sisters.

== Career ==
Hanzlíková began learning to skate in 2008. She is coached by Monika Škorničková.

She appeared internationally on the novice level in the 2012–13 and 2013–14 seasons. Her junior international debut came in October 2014 at the Tirnavia Ice Cup.

=== 2015–2016 season ===
Making her first Junior Grand Prix (JGP) appearances, Hanzlíková placed 10th in Linz in September 2015 and 8th in Zagreb the following month. In December, she ranked 8th in her senior international debut, at the Santa Claus Cup in Budapest, and became the Czech senior national silver medalist, having finished second to Eliška Březinová at the Four Nationals in Třinec.

=== 2016–2017 season ===
Hanzlíková began her season in September 2016 with two 2016–17 JGP events; she placed 9th in Ostrava and 7th in Ljubljana. At the end of the month, she debuted on the Challenger Series, placing 11th at the 2016 CS Ondrej Nepela Memorial.

In December 2016, Hanzlíková outscored Březinová by seven points to win the Czech senior national title at the Four Nationals in Katowice. She was selected to compete at the 2017 European Championships in Ostrava. She qualified to the free skate by placing 15th in the short program and went on to finish 20th overall.

== Programs ==
Season	Short program	Free skating
2017–2018	Hip Hip, Chin Chin by Club des Belugas	O Fortuna (from Carmina Burana) by Carl Orff
2016–2017	Hip Hip, Chin Chin by Club des Belugas	O Fortuna (from Carmina Burana) by Carl Orff
2015–2016	Ice Symphony by Edvin Marton	Congo by Jerry Goldsmith

== Competitive highlights ==
International
Event	14–15	15–16	16–17	17–18	18–19
Worlds			37th		
Europeans			20th		
CS Alpen Trophy					WD
CS Finlandia					21st
CS Tallinn Trophy				23rd	WD
CS Ice Star				12th	
CS Lombardia				22nd	21st
CS Warsaw Cup			16th		
CS Ondrej Nepela			11th		
Bavarian Open		4th			
Cup of Nice				9th	
Ice Star					16th
NRW Trophy			5th		
Santa Claus Cup		8th			
Toruń Cup			4th		
International: Junior
Junior Worlds			16th		
JGP Austria		10th		21st	
JGP Croatia		8th			
JGP Czech Republic			9th		
JGP Slovenia			7th		
NRW Trophy	6th				
Hellmut Seibt	4th	4th			
Tirnavia Ice Cup	9th	1st	2nd		
National
Czech Champ.		2nd	1st	3rd	
Czech Junior Champ.	8th	2nd	1st	1st	
Four Nationals		5th	3rd	7th	
