= Petr Kotlařík =

Czech figure skater (born 1998)

Personal information
- Born: 1 November 1998 (age 27) Jihlava, Czech Republic
- Home town: Brno, Czech Republic
- Height: 1.80 m (5 ft 11 in)

Figure skating career
- Country: Czech Republic
- Discipline: Men's singles
- Coach: Rudolf Březina; Michal Březina; Josef Sabovčík
- Skating club: Sportovni Centrum Kuřim
- Began skating: 2003
- Retired: August 1, 2025

Medal record
Czech Championships
Gold medal – first place	2023 Budapest	Singles
Silver medal – second place	2019 Budapest	Singles
Bronze medal – third place	2016 Třinec	Singles
Bronze medal – third place	2018 Košice	Singles
Bronze medal – third place	2025 Cieszyn	Singles

Petr Kotlařík (born 1 November 1998) is a retired Czech figure skater. He is the 2023 Czech national Champion. He has competed in the final segment at two ISU Championships.

== Personal life ==
Petr Kotlařík was born on 1 November 1998 in Jihlava and grew up in Brno, Czech Republic.

== Career ==
=== Early years ===
Kotlařík began learning to skate in 2003. He has trained in both singles and pairs. He teamed up with Natálie Kratěnová around 2011 and skated with her for several years.

=== 2013 to 2015 ===
Kotlařík debuted on the Junior Grand Prix (JGP) series in October 2013, coached by Eva Horklová and Lucie Kratěnová in Brno and Prague. The following season, he was coached by Karel Fajfr in Brno and Oberstdorf. He was eliminated after the short program at the 2015 World Junior Championships in Tallinn, Estonia.

=== 2015–2016 season ===
Kotlařík became the Czech national bronze medalist at the 2016 Four Nationals and made his senior international debut at the Bavarian Open in February 2016. He was coached by Fajfr, Danielle Montalbano, and Rudolf Březina.

=== 2016–2017 season ===
Kotlařík was coached by Nikolai Morozov and Florent Amodio in Hackensack, New Jersey. He withdrew from the 2017 Four Nationals. His first senior international title came at the Dragon Trophy in February 2017. In March, he competed at the 2017 World Junior Championships in Taipei, Taiwan; he qualified to the free skate and finished 23rd overall.

=== 2017–2018 season ===
In January 2018, Kotlařík won the senior bronze medal at the Bavarian Open. In March, he placed 20th at the 2018 World Junior Championships in Sofia, Bulgaria. He was coached by Florent Amodio in Hackensack, New Jersey, United States, and by Petr Starec in Brno, Czech Republic.

=== 2018–2019 season ===
Kotlařík is coached by Amodio in Vaujany and Paris (France), Hackensack (New Jersey, United States), and Brno (Czech Republic).

=== 2022–2023 season ===
After a 4-year break due to injury and retirement from skating (2019–2022), Kotlařík is returning to competitive skating. Kotlařík is coached by Brezina Rudolf, Brezina Michal and Josef Sabovcik in Brno (Czech Republic). He won his very first National Title in Senior category.

== Programs ==
Season	Short program	Free skating
2022–2023	Make It Rain by Foy Vance performed by Ed Sheeran; Sing by Ed Sheeran, Pharrell Williams	Queens by Lennon–McCartney
2019–2022	Retired	Retired
2018–2019	Make It Rain by Foy Vance performed by Ed Sheeran; Sing by Ed Sheeran, Pharrell Williams	Broken Vow performed by Josh Groban
2017–2018	City of Stars (from La La Land) by Justin Hurwitz	Broken Vow performed by Josh Groban
2016–2017	Minnie the Moocher performed by Robbie Williams; Jumpin' Jack by Big Bad Voodoo Daddy	Moulin Rouge!; El Tango de Roxanne by Sting; Nature Boy by eden ahbez; El Tango de Roxanne by Sting
2015–2016	The Mask	Don Quixote – Classical Variation II; Don Quixote – Coda: Basilio and Quiteria by Nayden Todorov
2014–2015	Capone by Ronan Hardiman	Don Quixote – Classical Variation II; Don Quixote – Coda: Basilio and Quiteria by Nayden Todorov
2013–2014	Step Up; Bout It; Show Me the Money	Requiem for a Tower by Escala

== Competitive highlights ==
CS: Challenger Series; JGP: Junior Grand Prix

=== Men's singles ===
International
Event	13–14	14–15	15–16	16–17	17–18	18–19	22–23	23–24	24–25
Europeans							25th		
CS Finlandia						12th			
CS Golden Spin				15th	14th				
CS Lombardia						7th			
CS Tallinn Trophy						8th			
CS Warsaw Cup				14th					
Bavarian Open			7th	6th	3rd				
Bosphorus Cup							4th		
Challenge Cup						WD	7th		
Cup of Nice							10th		
Cup of Tyrol				11th					
Denkova-Staviski Cup									12th
Dragon Trophy				1st			7th		
Seibt Memorial			5th						
Skate Celje							2nd		2nd
Tayside Trophy							9th	14th	
Toruń Cup				5th					
University Games							21st		
Volvo Open						6th			
International: Junior
World Junior Champ.		28th		23rd	20th				
JGP Croatia			9th						
JGP Czech Republic	18th	8th							
JGP France				13th					
JGP Germany		13th							
JGP Slovakia			10th						
Bavarian Open		4th J							
Cup of Nice			3rd J						
EYOF		6th							
Lombardia Trophy		3rd J	1st J	2nd J					
Seibt Memorial	6th J								
National
Czech Champ.		5th	3rd	WD	3rd	2nd	1st		3rd
Czech Junior Champ.	4th	2nd J	2nd J	1st J	1st J				

== Detailed results ==
ISU personal best scores in the +5/-5 GOE System
Segment	Type	Score	Event
Total	TSS	188.38	2018 CS Tallinn Trophy
Short program	TSS	62.86	2018 CS Finlandia Trophy
Short program	TES	31.77	2018 CS Lombardia Trophy
Short program	PCS	32.45	2018 CS Tallinn Trophy
Free skating	TSS	126.52	2018 CS Tallinn Trophy
Free skating	TES	60.88	2018 CS Lombardia Trophy
Free skating	PCS	68.40	2018 CS Tallinn Trophy

Results in the 2024–25 season
Date	Event	SP		FS		Total	
Date	Event	P	Score	P	Score	P	Score
Nov 5-10, 2024	(Bulgaria) 2024 Denkova-Staviski Cup	12	49.00	12	91.50	12	140.50
Nov 14-17, 2024	(Slovenia) 2024 Skate Celje	1	53.45	2	101.70	2	155.15
Dec 13–15, 2024	(Poland) 2025 Four Nationals Championships	10	48.81	10	93.21	10	142.02
Dec 13–15, 2024	(Poland) 2025 Czech Championships (Note: In the Czech Republic, the Czech Championships are contested as part of the Four Nationals Championships.)	3	—N/a	3	—N/a	3	—N/a
