= 2016 Four Nationals Figure Skating Championships =

Figure skating competition

2016 Four National Figure Skating Championships
- Type: National championships
- Date: December 18 – 20, 2015
- Season: 2015–16
- Location: Třinec, Czech Republic
- Host: Czech Skating
- Venue: Werk Arena
- Previous: 2015 Four National Championships
- Next: 2017 Four National Championships

The 2016 Four National Figure Skating Championships included the Czech Republic, Slovakia, Poland, and Hungary. The event was held in December 2015 in Třinec, Czech Republic. Skaters comped in the disciplines of men's singles, ladies' singles, pair skating, and ice dancing.

The results were split by country; the three highest-placing skaters from each country formed their national podiums. The results were among the criteria used to determine international assignments. It was the eighth consecutive season that the Czech Republic, Slovakia, and Poland held their national championships together and the third season that Hungary participated.

== Medals summary ==
=== Czech Republic ===
Discipline	Gold	Silver	Bronze
Men	Michal Březina	Jiří Bělohradský	Petr Kotlařík
Ladies	Eliška Březinová	Michaela Lucie Hanzlíková	Anna Dušková

=== Slovakia ===
Discipline	Gold	Silver	Bronze
Men	Michael Neuman	Jakub Kršňák	Marco Klepoch
Ladies	Nicole Rajičová	Alexandra Hagarová	Nina Letenayová
Ice dancing	Federica Testa / Lukáš Csölley	—	

=== Poland ===
Discipline	Gold	Silver	Bronze
Men	Igor Reznichenko	Patrick Myzyk	Krzysztof Gała
Ladies	Aleksandra Rudolf	Agnieszka Rejment	Colette Kaminski
Ice dancing	Natalia Kaliszek / Maksym Spodyriev	—	

=== Hungary ===
Discipline	Gold	Silver	Bronze
Men	Alexander Maszljanko	Alexander Borovoj	Máté Böröcz
Ladies	Ivett Tóth	Fruzsina Medgyesi	Júlia Bátori
Pairs	Anna Marie Pearce / Mark Magyar	—	

== Senior results ==
=== Men ===
Rank	Name	Nation	Total points	SP		FS	
1	Michal Březina	Czech Republic	223.55	1	68.83	1	154.72
2	Igor Reznichenko	Poland	183.51	2	64.53	3	118.98
3	Jiří Bělohradský	Czech Republic	178.30	6	56.57	2	121.73
4	Patrick Myzyk	Poland	171.50	7	56.53	4	114.97
5	Petr Kotlařík	Czech Republic	167.14	3	62.59	6	104.55
6	Martin Bidař	Czech Republic	163.95	5	59.22	5	104.73
7	Krzysztof Gała	Poland	160.11	4	59.39	8	100.72
8	Michael Neuman	Slovakia	150.03	9	49.06	7	100.97
9	Alexander Maszljanko	Hungary	147.86	11	47.39	9	100.47
10	Łukasz Kędzierski	Poland	145.05	8	50.95	11	94.10
11	Jan Kurník	Czech Republic	137.86	16	42.74	10	95.12
12	Jakub Kršňák	Slovakia	133.63	10	47.50	13	86.13
13	Alexander Borovoj	Hungary	132.37	12	45.34	12	87.03
14	Marco Klepoch	Slovakia	128.19	13	44.99	14	83.20
15	Máté Böröcz	Hungary	125.88	15	42.91	15	82.97
16	Martin Krhovjak	Czech Republic	125.86	14	44.52	17	81.34
17	Wiktor Witkowski	Poland	119.20	17	37.07	16	82.13

=== Ladies ===
Rank	Name	Nation	Total points	SP		FS	
1	Nicole Rajičová	Slovakia	177.05	1	58.39	1	118.66
2	Ivett Tóth	Hungary	157.88	2	53.19	2	104.69
3	Fruzsina Medgyesi	Hungary	146.27	5	49.33	3	96.94
4	Eliška Březinová	Czech Republic	140.79	6	47.59	4	93.20
5	Michaela Lucie Hanzlíková	Czech Republic	135.74	8	42.89	5	92.85
6	Anna Dušková	Czech Republic	135.71	3	52.80	6	82.91
7	Elizaveta Ukolova	Czech Republic	132.87	4	50.34	7	82.53
8	Aneta Janiczková	Czech Republic	117.27	7	43.66	9	73.61
9	Aleksandra Rudolf	Poland	110.37	15	33.48	8	76.89
10	Alexandra Hagarová	Slovakia	104.53	14	34.69	10	69.84
11	Júlia Bátori	Hungary	104.01	10	37.46	15	66.55
12	Natálie Kratěnová	Czech Republic	102.78	13	34.69	13	68.09
13	Agnieszka Rejment	Poland	102.68	12	35.76	14	66.92
14	Colette Kaminski	Poland	101.81	16	33.36	12	68.45
15	Nina Letenayová	Slovakia	101.53	9	37.88	17	63.65
16	Oliwia Rzepiel	Poland	101.13	18	31.90	11	69.23
17	Elżbieta Gabryszak	Poland	97.88	19	31.53	16	66.35
18	Laura Raszyková	Czech Republic	92.94	17	32.91	18	60.03
19	Miroslava Magulová	Slovakia	91.73	11	37.45	19	54.28
20	Eszter Szombathelyi	Hungary	73.78	20	24.74	20	49.04

=== Pairs ===
Rank	Name	Nation	Total points	SP		FS	
1	Anna Marie Pearce / Mark Magyar	Hungary	112.76	1	38.63	1	74.13

=== Ice dancing ===
Rank	Name	Nation	Total points	SD		FD	
1	Federica Testa / Lukáš Csölley	Slovakia	160.26	1	64.22	1	96.04
2	Natalia Kaliszek / Maksym Spodyriev	Poland	149.26	2	59.32	2	89.94
