= Figure skating at the 2013 Winter Universiade – Men's singles =

Figure skating at the 2013 Winter Universiade included a men's event for senior level skaters. The short program was held on December 11 and the free skating on December 12, 2013.

== Results ==
Rank	Name	Nation	Total points	SP		FS	
1	Song Nan	China	220.70	1	81.56	2	139.14
2	Gordei Gorshkov	Russia	213.52	2	70.73	1	142.79
3	Akio Sasaki	Japan	203.66	6	67.69	3	135.97
4	Zhan Bush	Russia	200.16	8	66.50	4	133.66
5	Moris Kvitelashvili	Russia	189.76	5	69.40	7	120.36
6	Ronald Lam	Hong Kong	187.67	9	65.51	6	122.16
7	Wang Yi	China	186.98	7	67.29	8	119.69
8	Kim Min-seok	South Korea	185.80	14	59.53	5	126.27
9	Guan Jinlin	China	185.69	4	69.45	11	116.24
10	Viktor Romanenkov	Estonia	182.84	10	64.35	9	118.49
11	Igor Reznichenko	Ukraine	180.51	12	62.65	10	117.86
12	Abzal Rakimgaliev	Kazakhstan	178.63	11	64.00	13	114.63
13	Yoji Tsuboi	Japan	176.90	3	69.47	17	107.43
14	Stéphane Walker	Switzerland	176.26	13	62.48	14	113.78
15	Pavel Ignatenko	Belarus	170.77	18	54.70	12	116.07
16	Mikhail Karaliuk	Belarus	166.50	15	59.22	18	107.28
17	Javier Raya	Spain	165.37	17	55.20	15	110.17
18	Paolo Bacchini	Italy	164.47	16	57.45	19	107.02
19	Pavel Kaška	Czech Republic	162.34	19	54.63	16	107.71
20	Jui-Shu Chen	Chinese Taipei	151.61	20	54.33	21	97.28
21	Saverio Giacomelli	Italy	149.26	23	51.87	20	97.39
22	Ali Demirboğa	Turkey	143.04	24	51.84	22	91.20
23	Jordan Ju	Chinese Taipei	139.91	22	51.95	23	87.96
24	Andrew Dodds	Australia	130.17	21	52.50	24	77.67
Did not advance to free skating
25	Mario-Rafael Ionian	Austria		25	50.06		
26	Maurizio Zandron	Italy		26	48.10		
27	Mark Webster	Australia		27	47.66		
28	Felipe Montoya	Spain		28	47.61		
29	Manuel Koll	Austria		29	45.48		
30	Florian Lejeune	France		30	44.13		
31	Jordan Dodds	Australia		31	41.41		
32	Suchet Kongchim	Thailand		32	32.68		
WD	Denis Ten	Kazakhstan					

== Panel of Judges ==
Function	Name	Nation
Referee	Aniela Hebel-Szmak	ISU
Technical Controller	Vera Tauchmanova	ISU
Technical Specialist	Evelyn Rossoukhi-Schneider	ISU
Assistant Technical Specialist	Igor Bich	ISU
Judge	Richard Kosina	Czech Republic
Judge	Akiko Kobayashi	Japan
Judge	Sakong Kyung-won	South Korea
Judge	Alexandre Gorojdanov	Belarus
Judge	Jiang Hailan	China
Judge	Daniela Cavelli	Italy
Judge	Alice Walder	Switzerland
Data Operator	Flavia Graglia	ISU
Replay Operator	Maria Baekgaard Kjaer	ISU
