= Matyáš Bělohradský =

Czech figure skater

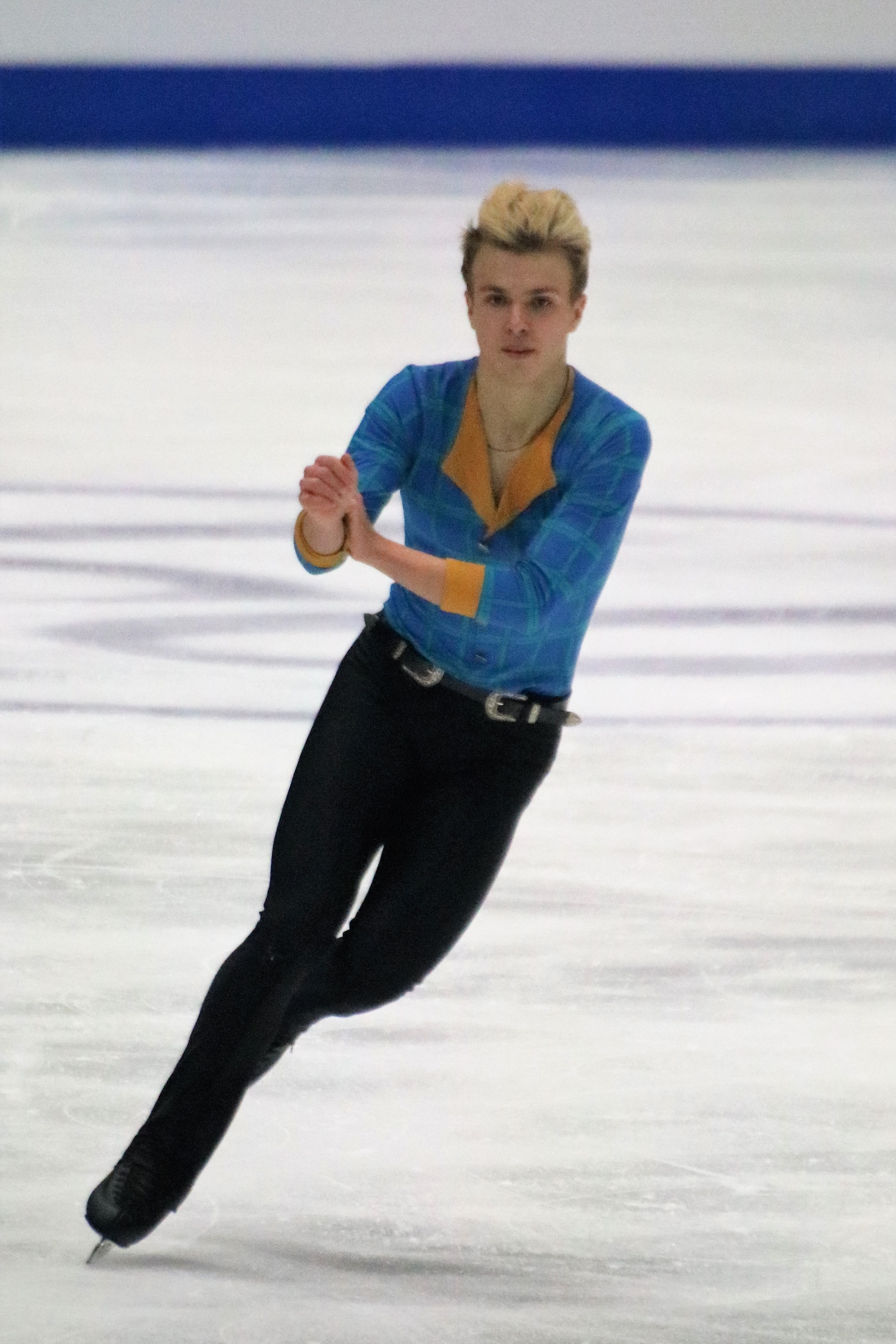
- Bělohradský at the 2020 European Championships

Personal information
- Born: 7 June 2001 (age 25) Planá, Czech Republic
- Home town: Mariánské Lázně, Czech Republic
- Height: 1.76 m (5 ft 9 1/2 in)

Figure skating career
- Country: Czech Republic
- Discipline: Men's singles
- Began skating: 2007
- Retired: 2022

Medal record
Czech Championships
Gold medal – first place	2019 Budapest	Singles
Gold medal – first place	2022 Spišská Nová Ves	Singles
Silver medal – second place	2017 Katowice	Singles
Silver medal – second place	2018 Košice	Singles
Silver medal – second place	2020 Ostrava	Singles

Matyáš Bělohradský (born 7 June 2001) is a Czech retired figure skater. He is a two-time Czech national champion (2019, 2022).

== Personal life ==
Matyáš Bělohradský was born on 7 June 2001 in Planá, Czech Republic. He is the younger brother of Czech figure skater Jiří Bělohradský.

== Career ==
=== Early career ===
Bělohradský began learning to skate in 2007. He competed on the advanced novice level from April 2013 to February 2014. His junior international debut came in September 2014 at the ISU Junior Grand Prix in the Czech Republic. At the time, he was coached by Monika Škorničková in Mariánské Lázně.

=== 2016–2017 season ===
In September 2016, Bělohradský won bronze at the 2016 Cup of Mordovia in Saransk, Russia. In December, he finished fourth, competing in the senior ranks at the 2017 Four National Championships in Katowice, Poland. He won his first senior national medal, silver, having finished second to his brother, Jiří Bělohradský. Vlasta Kopřivová and Tomáš Verner coached him in Prague.

=== 2017–2018 season ===
Making his senior international debut, Bělohradský finished 12th at the 2017 CS Minsk-Arena Ice Star in October. In December, he placed third at the 2018 Four National Championships in Košice, Slovakia, having ranked sixth in the short program and first in the free skate. He repeated as national silver medalist, again finishing second to his brother.

=== 2018–2019 season ===
Bělohradský appeared at two Junior Grand Prix events and then placed sixth in the senior ranks at the 2018 CS Tallinn Trophy. In December 2018, he finished first at the Four National Championships in Budapest, Hungary. It was his first senior national title. He was named in the Czech team to the 2019 European Championships in Minsk, Belarus.

=== 2021–2022 season ===
Bělohradský began the season at the 2021 CS Lombardia Trophy, where he placed seventeenth. At this second Challenger event, the 2021 CS Finlandia Trophy, he finished sixteenth and was later fifteenth at the 2021 CS Cup of Austria. He was twenty-seventh at the 2022 European Championships, failing to qualify for the free skate.

== Programs ==
Season	Short program	Free skating
2021–2022	Love Is a Bitch by Two Feet; Seven Nation Army by Jack White performed by White Stripes	From Now On performed by Hugh Jackman; The Other Side performed by Hugh Jackman & Zac Efron; The Greatest Show performed by Hugh Jackman, Keala Settle, Zac Efron & Zendaya (from The Greatest Showman)
2019–2020	Love Is a Bitch by Two Feet; Seven Nation Army by Jack White performed by White Stripes	Dueling Banjos performed by Arthur Smith, Don Reno; Down the Road by Mac McAnally
2018–2019	Chambermaid Swing by Parov Stelar	Dueling Banjos performed by Arthur Smith, Don Reno; Down the Road by Mac McAnally
2017–2018	Chambermaid Swing by Parov Stelar	The Pink Panther Theme by Henry Mancini
2016–2017	Puttin' On the Ritz (Club des Belugas remix) by Irving Berlin; Jolie Coquine by Caravan Palace	The Pink Panther Theme by Henry Mancini
2014–2015	Toccata and Fugue in D minor, BWV 565 (modern arrangement) by Johann Sebastian Bach choreo. by Monika Škorničková	Puss in Boots by Henry Jackman choreo. by Monika Škorničková

== Competitive highlights ==
- JGP – Event of the ISU Junior Grand Prix Series
- CS – Event of the ISU Challenger Series

Competition placements at senior level
Season	2016–17	2017–18	2018–19	2019–20	2021–22
European Championships			19th	20th	27th
Czech Championships	2nd	2nd	1st	2nd	1st
CS Cup of Austria					15th
CS Finlandia Trophy					16th
CS Ice Star		12th			
CS Lombardia Trophy					17th
CS Tallinn Trophy			6th		
Challenge Cup					5th

Competition placements at junior level
Season	2014–15	2015–16	2016–17	2017–18	2018–19	2019–20
World Junior Championships					15th	
Czech Championships	4th	3rd		3rd	1st	2nd
JGP Czech Republic	11th		9th		10th	
JGP Estonia	14th					
JGP Latvia				6th		
JGP Lithuania					6th	
JGP Russia			3rd			
JGP United States						6th
Cup of Nice				1st		
Ice Star					2nd	
Leo Scheu Memorial		4th				
Merano Cup		3rd	3rd			
NRW Trophy	2nd	4th				
Santa Claus Cup			3rd			
Tallinn Trophy			1st	3rd		
Tirnavia Ice Cup	2nd					

== Detailed results ==
ISU personal best scores in the +5/-5 GOE System
Segment	Type	Score	Event
Total	TSS	194.23	2019 World Junior Championships
Short program	TSS	69.39	2018 CS Tallinn Trophy
Short program	TES	35.59	2018 CS Tallinn Trophy
Short program	PCS	33.80	2018 CS Tallinn Trophy
Free skating	TSS	128.52	2019 JGP United States
Free skating	TES	61.86	2019 JGP United States
Free skating	PCS	69.10	2018 CS Tallinn Trophy

ISU personal best scores in the +3/-3 GOE System
Segment	Type	Score	Event
Total	TSS	192.60	2016 JGP Russia
Short program	TSS	66.31	2016 JGP Russia
Short program	TES	36.46	2016 JGP Russia
Short program	PCS	30.00	2018 Ice Star
Free skating	TSS	126.29	2016 JGP Russia
Free skating	TES	60.85	2016 JGP Russia
Free skating	PCS	65.44	2016 JGP Russia
