= Denis Margalik =

Argentine-Canadian figure skater

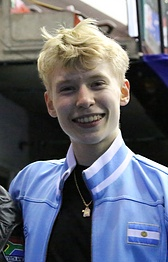

Personal information
- Born: June 3, 1997 (age 29) Buenos Aires, Argentina
- Height: 5 ft 9 in (1.75 m)

Figure skating career
- Country: Argentina (2014–2016); Canada (until 2014)
- Coach: Andrei Berezintsev, Inga Zusev
- Skating club: AREPH
- Began skating: 2005
- Retired: July 12, 2016

Denis Margalik (born June 3, 1997) is an Argentine-Canadian former figure skater. He became the first skater representing Argentina to win a medal on the ISU Junior Grand Prix series, obtaining bronze at JGP Bratislava in 2015. He is the first male skater to compete for Argentina in an ISU Championship, appearing at Four Continents in 2015 and at the World Championships in 2016.

== Personal life ==
Denis Margalik was born on June 3, 1997, in Buenos Aires, Argentina. His parents, born in Ukraine, relocated the family to New York, United States, in late December 1999, and soon after, to Canada. Margalik, the second of three boys, grew up in Mississauga before moving to Richmond Hill, Ontario. He attended Silverthorn Collegiate Institute, then graduated from Richmond Green Secondary School in June 2016. He attended Western University in London, Ontario, where he obtained his Bachelors of Medical Sciences (BMSc). He was assistant coach and captain of the Varsity Figure Skating Team, and a member of Kappa Sigma fraternity. After graduating from Western University he completed a MASc at University of Toronto in the field of biomedical engineering. Currently, he studies medicine at University of Toronto.

== Career ==
Margalik began skating in 2005. His first coach was Robert O'Toole, who taught him for eight years, mainly at the Woodbine Winter Club in Toronto. Margalik's early career was hindered by Osgood–Schlatter disease, which affected his knees. Competing on the junior level, he won the silver medal at the 2013 Canadian Championships and gold at the 2013 Mladost Trophy, his only international appearance for Canada. He changed coaches later in 2013, joining Andrei Berezintsev and Inga Zusev at the Richmond Training Centre in Richmond Hill, Ontario. He won the national junior title at the 2014 Canadian Championships.

Margalik debuted for Argentina in September 2014, placing fourth at the ISU Junior Grand Prix in Japan. Making his senior international debut, he finished seventh at the 2014 Skate Canada Autumn Classic, a part of the ISU Challenger Series. In February 2015, he competed at his first ISU Championship, the Four Continents in Seoul, South Korea. This is the first time an Argentine skater have participated in the Four Continents Championships. This is also the first time a male skater represented Argentina in an ISU Championship. Ranked 18th in the short program, he qualified for the free skate, where he placed 15th and rose to 16th overall. At the Junior Worlds, he achieved 12th place.

In August 2015, Margalik won Argentina's first ISU Junior Grand Prix medal, taking bronze at the 2015 JGP in Bratislava, Slovakia. In February 2016, he placed 17th at the Four Continents in Taipei. In March 2016, he participated at the World Championships in Boston, as the first skater representing Argentina in history.

Margalik announced his retirement on July 12, 2016. In a related news article, an ankle injury was cited.

== Programs ==
| Season | Short program | Free skating |
|---|---|---|
| 2015–2016 | Introduction from The Lady and the Hooligan; Tango by Dmitri Shostakovich choreo. by Lori Nichol | Theme from Gladiator by Hans Zimmer performed by Maksim Mrvica |
| 2014–2015 | Introduction from The Lady and the Hooligan; Tango by Dmitri Shostakovich choreo. by Lori Nichol | Lee Loos' Tune performed by Maksim Mrvica choreo. by Andrei Berezintsev |
| 2013–2014 | | Lee Loos' Tune performed by Maksim Mrvica choreo. by Andrei Berezintsev |

== Competitive highlights ==
CS: Challenger Series; JGP: Junior Grand Prix

=== For Argentina ===
International
| Event | 2014–15 | 2015–16 |
|---|---|---|
| World Championships | | 29th |
| Four Continents Championships | 16th | 17th |
| CS Autumn Classic | 7th | 7th |
| Argentine Championships | | 1st |
International: Junior
| World Junior Championships | 12th | |
| JGP Japan | 4th | |
| JGP Slovakia | | 3rd |
| JGP Spain | | 8th |

=== For Canada ===
International: Junior
| Event | 2011–12 | 2012–13 | 2013–14 |
|---|---|---|---|
| Mladost Trophy | | 1st J. | |
National
| Canadian Championships | 14th J. | 2nd J. | 1st J. |
