= Argentine Figure Skating Championships =

Recurring figure skating competition

- Status: Active
- Genre: National championships
- Frequency: Annual
- Country: Argentina
- Inaugurated: 2004
- Organizer: Argentine Figure Skating Federation

The Argentine Figure Skating Championships (Spanish: Campeonato Nacional Argentino de Patinaje sobre Hielo) are an annual figure skating competition organized by the Argentine Figure Skating Federation (Spanish: Federación Argentina de Patinaje sobre Hielo) to crown the national champions of Argentina. Medals are awarded in men's and women's singles at the senior and junior levels, although each discipline may not necessarily be held every year due to a lack of participants.

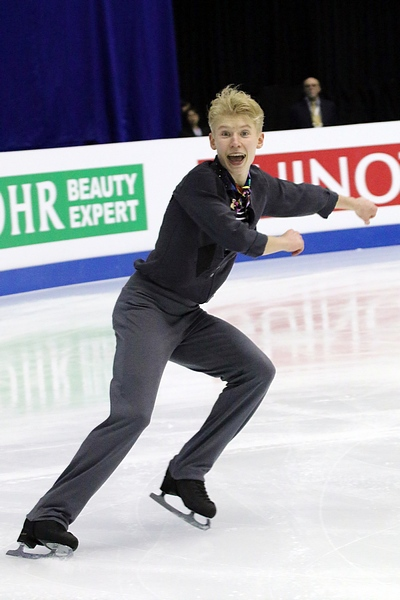
Denis Margalik was the first Argentine skater to win a medal in international competition.

The Argentine Figure Skating Federation was established in 2002 and became a member of the International Skating Union in 2004. Argentina held their first national championships in 2004 in Neuquén. However, it was not until 2014 that junior-level skaters competing at the national championships, and not until 2015 that Argentine skaters competed at the senior level.

== Senior medalists ==
=== Men's singles ===
Men's event medalists
Season	Location	Gold	Silver	Bronze	Ref.
2015–16	Buenos Aires	Denis Margalik	No other competitors		
2016–17	Buenos Aires	No men's competitors			
2017–18	Buenos Aires	No men's competitors			
2018–19	Buenos Aires	Mauro Calcagno	No other competitors		
No men's competitors since 2018–19

=== Women's singles ===
Women's event medalists
Season	Location	Gold	Silver	Bronze	Ref.
2015–16	Buenos Aires	Maria Andrea An	Anhelina Bosko	No other competitors	
2016–17	Buenos Aires	Anhelina Bosko	Maria Andrea An	No other competitors	
2017–18	Buenos Aires	Anhelina Bosko	Maria Andrea An	No other competitors	
2018–19	Buenos Aires	Anhelina Bosko	Maria Andrea Ann	No other competitors	
2019–20	Buenos Aires	Maria Andrea Ann	Cecilia Schinocca	No other competitors	
2020–21	Competitions cancelled due to the COVID-19 pandemic				
2021–22	Competitions cancelled due to the COVID-19 pandemic				
2022–23	Ushuaia	Michelle Di Cicco	No other competitors		
2023–24	Ushuaia	Sophia Dayan	Cecilia Schinocca	No other competitors	
2024–25	Buenos Aires	Sophia Dayan	Michelle Di Cicco	No other competitors	
2025–26	Buenos Aires	Sophia Dayan			

== Junior medalists ==
=== Men's singles ===
Junior men's event medalists
Season	Location	Gold	Silver	Bronze	Ref.
2014–15	Buenos Aires	No junior men's competitors			
2015–16	Buenos Aires	No junior men's competitors			
2016–17	Buenos Aires	No junior men's competitors			
2017–18	Buenos Aires	Mauro Calcagno	No other competitors		
No junior men's competitors since 2017–18

=== Women's singles ===
Junior women's event medalists
Season	Location	Gold	Silver	Bronze	Ref.
2014–15	Buenos Aires	Anhelina Bosko	Maria Andrea An & Ivana Nai Fovino (Note: Due to an unintentional error in calculating her scores, Maria Andrea An was originally placed third. When the error was discovered, she was also awarded a silver medal.)	No bronze medal awarded	
2015–16	Buenos Aires	Florencia Lin	Ivanna Nai Fovino	No other competitors	
2016–17	Buenos Aires	Florencia Lin	Cecilia Schinocca	No other competitors	
2017–18	Buenos Aires	Nicole Mottchouk	No other competitors		
2018–19	Buenos Aires				
2019–20	Buenos Aires	Chiara Balbo	Sophia Dayan	Michelle Di Cicco	
2020–21	Competitions cancelled due to the COVID-19 pandemic				
2021–22	Competitions cancelled due to the COVID-19 pandemic				
2022–23	Ushuaia	Cecilia Donohue	Sophia Dayan	Luana Beltrán	
2023–24	Ushuaia	Cecilia Donohue	Lilia Vlasenko	Luana Beltrán	
2024–25	Buenos Aires	Stefanía Soloveva	Lilia Vlasenko	No other competitors	
2025–26	Buenos Aires				
