= Jiří Bělohradský =

Czech figure skater

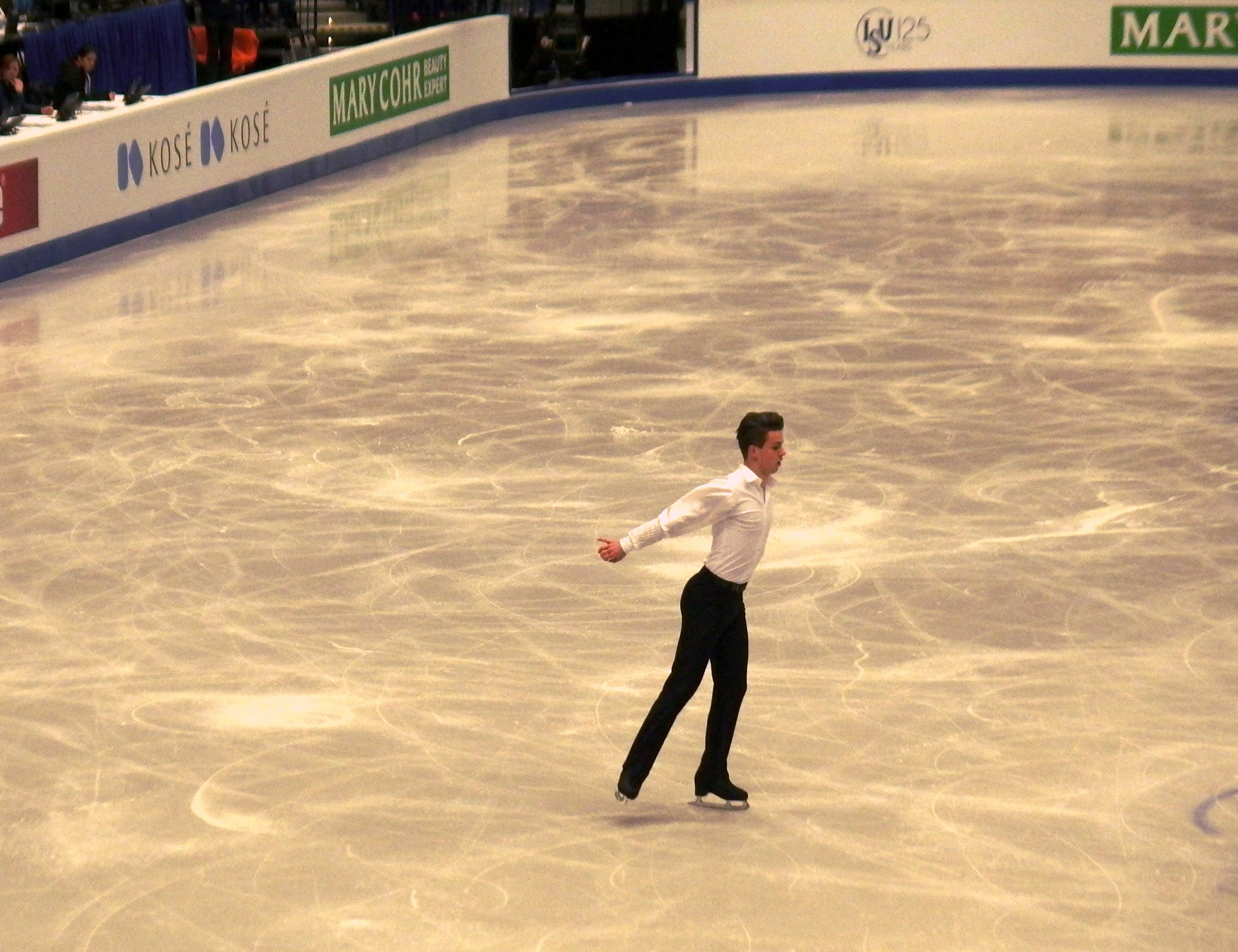
- Jiří Bělohradský at the 2017 European Figure Skating Championships, Ostrava

Personal information
- Born: 20 January 1999 (age 27) Mariánské Lázně, Czech Republic
- Home town: Mariánské Lázně
- Height: 1.78 m (5 ft 10 in)

Figure skating career
- Country: Czech Republic
- Coach: Vlasta Kopřivová, Tomáš Verner
- Skating club: HC Stadion Cheb
- Began skating: 2006

Medal record
Czech Championships
| Gold medal – first place | 2017 Katowice | Singles |
| Gold medal – first place | 2018 Košice | Singles |
| Gold medal – first place | 2021 Cieszyn | Singles |
| Silver medal – second place | 2016 Třinec | Singles |
| Bronze medal – third place | 2020 Ostrava | Singles |

Jiří Bělohradský (born 20 January 1999) is a Czech competitive figure skater. He is the 2015 Merano Cup bronze medalist and two-time Czech national champion. He has qualified for the free skate at three ISU Championships.

== Personal life ==
Jiří Bělohradský was born on 20 January 1999 in Mariánské Lázně, Czech Republic. He is the older brother of Czech figure skater Matyáš Bělohradský.

== Career ==
Bělohradský's ISU Junior Grand Prix (JGP) debut came in the 2014–15 season; he placed 14th in Ljubljana, Slovenia in late August 2014 and 18th in Zagreb, Croatia in October. He was selected to compete at the 2015 World Junior Championships in Tallinn, Estonia, but was eliminated after placing 39th in the short program. He trained under Monika Škorničková in Mariánské Lázně until the end of the season.

Bělohradský changed coaches ahead of the 2015–16 season, joining Vlasta Kopřivová in Prague. In September, he competed at two 2015 JGP events, finishing 18th in Linz, Austria and 11th in Toruń, Poland. Making his senior international debut, he placed 9th at the 2015 Ice Challenge, an ISU Challenger Series (CS) event in October. He won a bronze medal at the Merano Cup and placed 10th at the NRW Trophy. In December, he made his first senior national podium, taking silver behind Michal Březina.

Bělohradský was selected to compete at the 2016 European Championships in Bratislava, Slovakia as the Czech Republic's second entry in the men's event. Ranked 19th in the short program, he qualified for the free skate and finished 20th overall. He also reached the final segment at the 2016 World Junior Championships in Debrecen, Hungary, placing 16th in both segments and overall.

== Programs ==
| Season | Short program | Free skating |
|---|---|---|
| 2019–2020 | Bohemian Rhapsody by Queen | Torn by Phil Thomalley, Scott Culler, Anne Preven performed by Nathan Lanier; Sand by Nathan Lanier |
| 2018–2019 | Sarabande Suite performed by Globus | Torn by Phil Thomalley, Scott Culler, Anne Preven performed by Nathan Lanier; Sand by Nathan Lanier |
| 2017–2018 | Sarabande Suite performed by Globus | Moonlight Sonata by Ludwig van Beethoven |
| 2016–2017 | Everything; Played-A-Live (The Bongo Song) by Safri Duo | Moonlight Sonata by Ludwig van Beethoven |
| 2015–2016 | Toccata and Fugue by Johann Sebastian Bach (modern arrangement) | Carmen by Georges Bizet |
| 2014–2015 | Freejack by Trevor Jones | Rabbia e Tarantella by Ennio Morricone |

== Competitive highlights ==
CS: Challenger Series; JGP: Junior Grand Prix

=== Single skating ===
International
| Event | 13–14 | 14–15 | 15–16 | 16–17 | 17–18 | 18–19 | 19–20 | 20-21 |
|---|---|---|---|---|---|---|---|---|
| Europeans | | | 20th | 20th | 28th | | | |
| CS Finlandia | | | | 12th | | | WD | |
| CS Ice Challenge | | | 9th | | | | | |
| CS Ice Star | | | | | 11th | | | |
| CS Lombardia | | | | | | 12th | | |
| CS Nebelhorn Trophy | | | | | | | | WD |
| CS Ondrej Nepela | | | | | | 8th | 7th | |
| CS Tallinn Trophy | | | | | 12th | 15th | | |
| CS Warsaw Cup | | | | | | | | C |
| Bavarian Open | | | | | | 9th | | |
| Cup of Nice | | | | | 8th | | | |
| Ice Star | | | | | | 4th | | |
| Merano Cup | | | 3rd | | | | | |
| NRW Trophy | | | 10th | | | | | |
| Prague Ice Cup | | | | | | | 2nd | |
| Santa Claus Cup | | | | | | | | 2nd |
International: Junior
| Junior Worlds | | 39th | 16th | | | | | |
| JGP Austria | | | 18th | | | | | |
| JGP Belarus | | | | | 6th | | | |
| JGP Croatia | | 18th | | | | | | |
| JGP Czech Rep. | | | | 8th | | | | |
| JGP Poland | | | 11th | | 9th | | | |
| JGP Slovenia | | 14th | | 10th | | | | |
| NRW Trophy | | 5th J | | | | | | |
| Skate Helena | | 2nd J | | | | | | |
| Tirnavia Ice Cup | | 1st J | | | | | | |
National
| Czech Champ. | 7th | 6th | 2nd | 1st | 1st | 5th | 3rd | 1st |
| Czech Junior Champ. | 5th | 1st | 1st | 2nd | | | | |
