= Nina Povey =

British figure skater (born 1994)

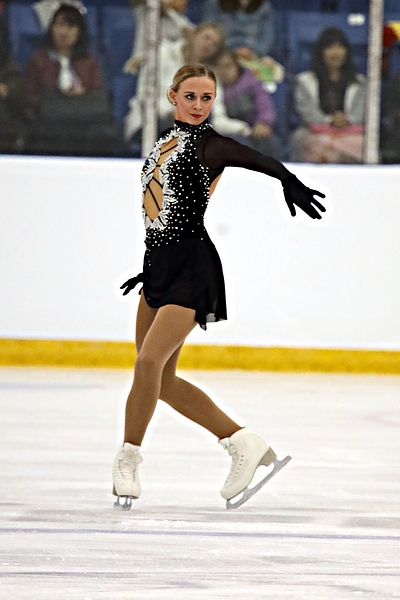
- Nina Povey at the 2019 Autumn Classic International

Personal information
- Born: 27 August 1994 (age 31) Nottingham, England, United Kingdom
- Height: 1.56 m (5 ft 1 1/2 in)

Figure skating career
- Country: Great Britain
- Discipline: Women's singles
- Coach: Helen James-Green; Debbie Wright
- Skating club: Ice Sheffield
- Began skating: 2003
- Retired: 15 August, 2026

Medal record
British Championships
Gold medal – first place	2024 Sheffield	Singles
Silver medal – second place	2025 Sheffield	Singles
Silver medal – second place	2026 Sheffield	Singles
Bronze medal – third place	2016 Sheffield	Singles
Bronze medal – third place	2022 Sheffield	Singles
Bronze medal – third place	2023 Sheffield	Singles

Nina Povey (born 27 August 1994) is a retired British figure skater. She has won 11 senior international medals and is the 2024 British national champion, a two-time British national silver medalist (2025-26), and a three-time British national bronze medalist (2016, 2022–2023).

== Personal life ==
Povey was born on 27 August 1994 in Nottingham, England. In addition to figure skating, she also works as a figure skating costume designer.

In December 2023, she married her boyfriend, Nathan Wright.

== Career ==
Povey began learning to skate in 2003. She trained in Solihull before eventually relocating to Sheffield. Povey made her senior international debut at the Bavarian Open in February 2015, where she finished in twelfth place. That same year, Povey won her first medal, bronze, at the 2016 British Championships. She subsequently won her first senior international medal, bronze, at the 2018 Mentor Toruń Cup.

After winning her first senior international gold medal at the 2022 Britannia Cup, Povey was featured in BBC Three's Freeze: Skating on the Edge.

=== 2023–24 season: British national title ===
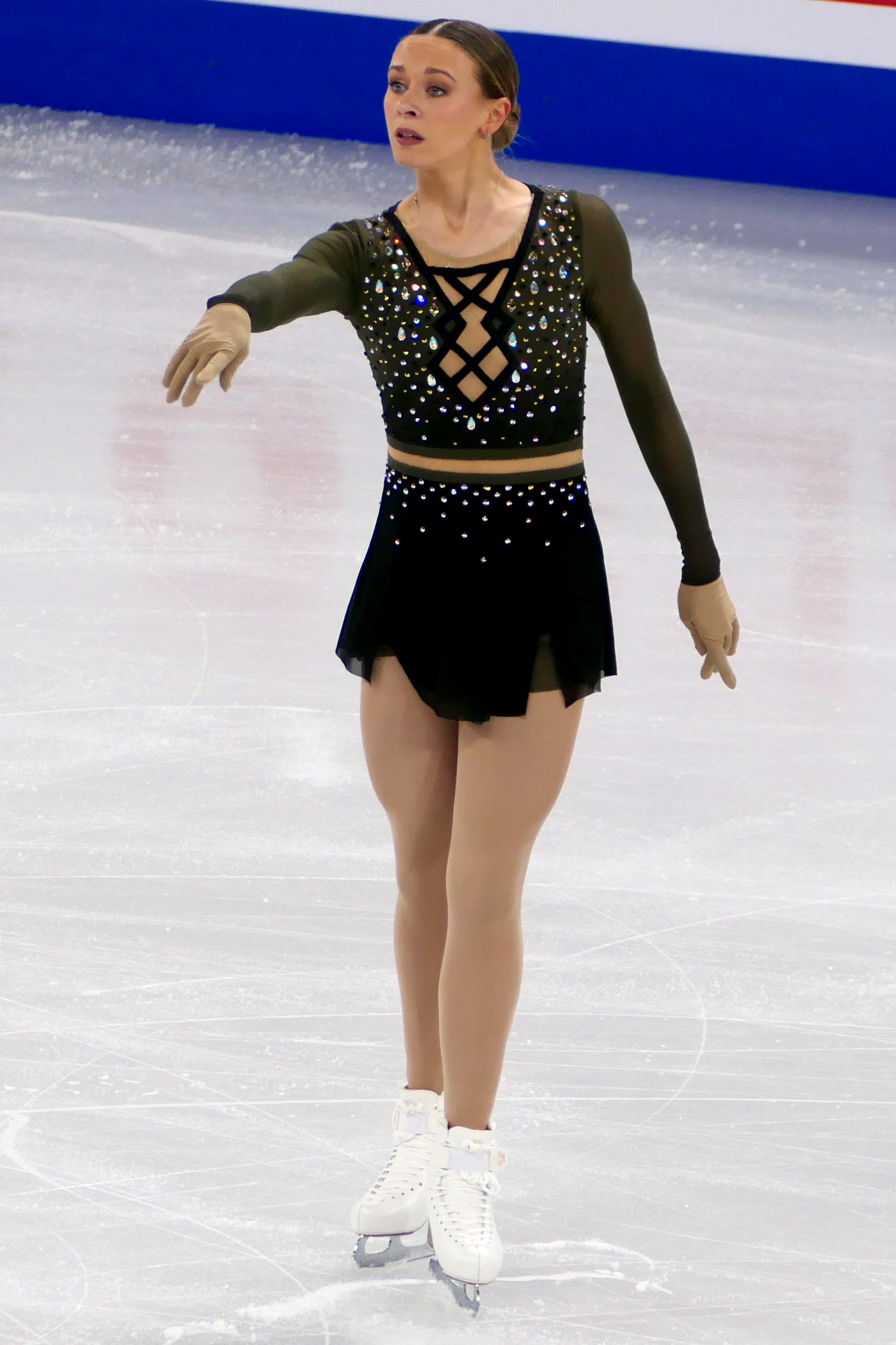
Povey at the 2024 World Championships

Povey began the season with a tenth-place finish at the 2023 CS Nepela Memorial. She followed this up by winning bronze at the 2023 Denkova-Staviski Cup and finishing ninth at the 2023 CS Warsaw Cup.

In December 2023, Povey won her first national title. In January 2024, she competed at her first European Championships with the goal of qualifying for the free skate; she did so and placed seventeenth overall. The following month, she won the bronze medal at the 2024 Bellu Memorial.

In March, she also competed at her first World Championships in Montreal. She placed 25th and narrowly missed qualifying to the free skate.

=== 2024–25 season ===
Povey opened the season by finishing fifth at the 2024 Tayside Trophy and seventh at the 2024 Denkova-Staviski Cup. She then went on to win gold at the 2024 Skate Celje.

In December, Povey won the silver medal at the 2025 British Championships behind Kristen Spours. She subsequently finished the season by winning bronze at the 2025 Black Sea Cup.

=== 2025–26 season ===
Povey started the season by competing at the 2025 Robin Cousins Cup, although she was forced to withdraw on the day of the free skate due to suffering a migraine. She went on to compete at the 2025 CS Nepela Memorial, where she finished in nineteenth place. In October, she won bronze at the 2025 Tayside Trophy and at the 2025 Tirnavia Ice Cup. The following month, she finished seventh at the 2025 Denkova-Staviski Cup and won bronze at the 2025 NRW Trophy, before winning silver at the 2026 British Championships behind Kristen Spours.

Selected to compete at the 2026 European Championships in Sheffield, England, United Kingdom, Povey placed thirty-first in the short program and did not advance to the free skate segment. She followed this up by winning silver at the 2026 EDGE Cup.

Povey announced her retirement from competitive skating on 15 August, 2026.

== Programs ==
Season	Short program	Free skating
2025–2026	Rescue by Lauren Daigle choreo. by Mark Hanretty	David's Writings (from The Personal History of David Copperfield) by Christopher Willis; Spring 1 (from The Four Seasons) by Antonio Vivaldi performed by Max Richter, André de Ridder, & Daniel Hope; Bridgerton; A Grand Finish by Kris Bowers; The End by JPOLND & Rachel K Collier; Call Me Simon by Kris Bowers; Fate's Illumination by Matthew Chastney choreo. by Mark Hanretty
2024–2025	Hold My Hand (from Top Gun: Maverick) by Lady Gaga choreo. by Mark Hanretty	Game of Survival; The Other Side by Ruelle; There's a Hero In You by Tommee Profitt ft. Fleurie choreo. by Mark Hanretty
2023–2024	Hold My Hand (from Top Gun: Maverick) by Lady Gaga choreo. by Mark Hanretty	Mother Me; Stumbled Beginnings; Swan Lake: Act IV: No.28 Scene ~ No.29 Finale; Stumbled Beginnings; A Swan is Born (from Black Swan) by Clint Mansell, Pyotr Tchaikovsky choreo. by Mark Hanretty
2022–2023	I Giorni by Angèle Dubeau, La Pietà; Divenire by Mari Samuelsen, Håkon Samuelsen choreo. by Mark Hanretty	Mother Me; Stumbled Beginnings; Swan Lake: Act IV: No.28 Scene ~ No.29 Finale; Stumbled Beginnings; A Swan is Born (from Black Swan) by Clint Mansell, Pyotr Tchaikovsky choreo. by Mark Hanretty
2021–2022	I Giorni by Angèle Dubeau, La Pietà; Divenire by Mari Samuelsen, Håkon Samuelsen choreo. by Mark Hanretty	Tango To Evora by Roby Lakatos; Tango To Evora (from The Visit) by Loreena McKennitt; Tanos (from Napoli velata) by Lino Cannavacciuolo choreo. by Mark Hanretty
2019–2020	True Colors performed by Tom Odell	Tango to Evora; Tanos
2016–2017	The Windmills of Your Mind by Michel Legrand performed by Barbra Streisand	Wings by Birdy

== Competitive highlights ==
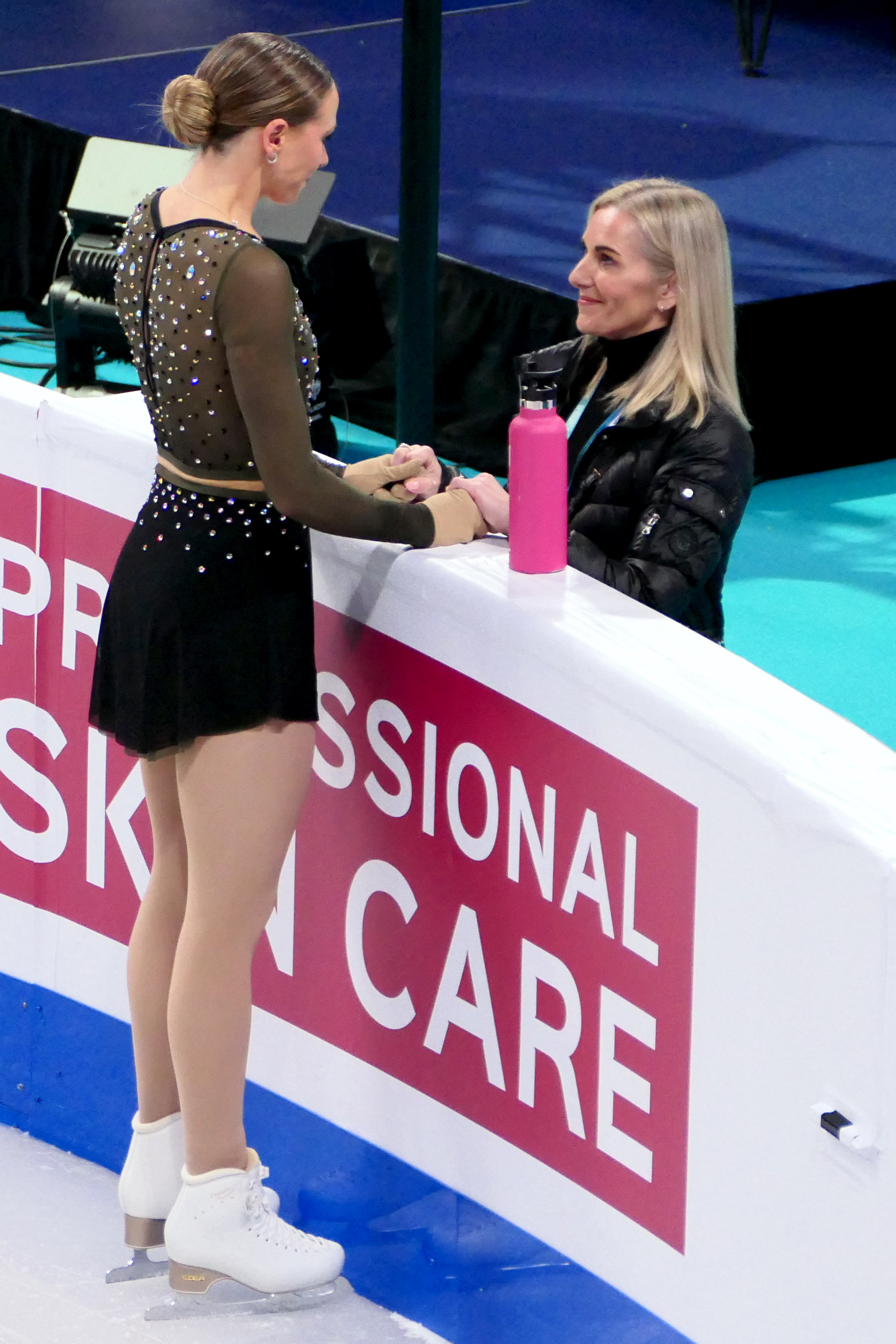
Povey before her short program at the 2024 World Championships

- CS – Event of the ISU Challenger Series
- TBD – Assigned
- WD – Withdrew from competition

Competition placements at senior level
Season	2014–15	2015–16	2016–17	2017–18	2018–19	2019–20	2021–22	2022–23	2023–24	2024–25	2025–26
World Championships									25th		
European Championships									17th		31st
British Championships	4th	3rd	4th	5th	5th	4th	3rd	3rd	1st	2nd	2nd
CS Autumn Classic						9th					
CS Finlandia Trophy						14th					
CS Ice Challenge							21st				
CS Lombardia Trophy				27th			18th				
CS Nepela Memorial			19th					5th	10th	7th	19th
CS Warsaw Cup				4th					9th		
Bavarian Open	12th										
Black Sea Ice Cup										3rd	
Bellu Memorial									3rd		
Britannia Cup								1st			
Budapest Trophy							17th				
Challenge Cup				5th			8th				
Crystal Skate								4th			
Cup of Nice			8th	16th							
Denkova-Staviski Cup									3rd	4th	7th
EduSport Trophy								3rd			
EDGE Cup											2nd
Golden Bear of Zagreb					6th						
Mentor Toruń Cup			9th	3rd	9th						
NRW Trophy											3rd
Robin Cousins Cup											WD
Skate Celje								2nd		1st	
Skate Helena			WD								
Tayside Trophy										5th	3rd
Tirnavia Ice Cup							6th				
Volvo Open Cup		11th	7th		4th	8th		4th			

Competition placements at junior level
Season	2010–11	2011–12	2012–13	2013–14
British Championships	11th	14th	5th	9th
Santa Claus Cup				11th
Tirnavia Ice Cup			4th	

== Detailed results ==
ISU personal best scores in the +5/-5 GOE System
Segment	Type	Score	Event
Total	TSS	156.92	2022 CS Nepela Memorial
Short program	TSS	54.78	2024 European Championships
Short program	TES	29.56	2024 European Championships
Short program	PCS	25.22	2024 European Championships
Free skating	TSS	104.40	2022 CS Nepela Memorial
Free skating	TES	53.00	2022 CS Nepela Memorial
Free skating	PCS	53.59	2024 European Championships

Results in the 2023–24 season
Date	Event	SP		FS		Total	
Date	Event	P	Score	P	Score	P	Score
28–30 Sep 2023	(Slovakia) 2023 CS Nepela Memorial	8	51.18	10	96.81	10	147.99
7–12 Nov 2023	(Bulgaria) 2023 Denkova-Staviski Cup	2	57.53	4	102.79	3	160.32
16–19 Nov 2023	(Poland) 2023 CS Warsaw Cup	10	53.51	8	100.28	9	153.79
27 Nov – 3 Dec 2023	(United Kingdom) 2024 British Championships	1	57.54	1	108.22	1	165.76
8–14 Jan 2024	(Lithuania) 2024 European Championships	17	54.78	17	99.27	17	154.05
20–25 Feb 2024	(Romania) 2024 Bellu Memorial	5	50.09	1	105.65	3	155.74
18–24 Mar 2024	(Canada) 2024 World Championships	25	53.50	-	-	25	53.50

Results in the 2024–25 season
Date	Event	SP		FS		Total	
Date	Event	P	Score	P	Score	P	Score
12–13 Oct 2024	(United Kingdom) 2024 Tayside Trophy	3	54.78	6	93.11	5	147.89
24–26 Oct 2024	(Slovakia) 2024 CS Nepela Memorial	11	48.01	6	98.77	7	146.78
5–10 Nov 2024	(Bulgaria) 2024 Denkova-Staviski Cup	4	57.37	3	107.12	4	164.49
14–17 Nov 2024	(Slovenia) 2024 Skate Celje	2	50.60	3	107.12	4	164.49
27 Nov – 1 Dec 2024	(United Kingdom) 2025 British Championships	2	53.64	2	106.06	2	159.70
5–6 Apr 2025	(Bulgaria) 2025 Black Sea Ice Cup	2	51.76	3	89.60	3	141.36

Results in the 2025–26 season
Date	Event	SP		FS		Total	
Date	Event	P	Score	P	Score	P	Score
21–22 Aug 2025	(United Kingdom) 2025 Robin Cousins Cup	8	40.74	–	–	–	WD
25–27 Sep 2025	(Slovakia) 2025 CS Nepela Memorial	17	48.48	19	82.45	19	130.93
11–12 Oct 2025	(United Kingdom) 2025 Tayside Trophy	4	50.33	3	94.75	3	145.08
7–9 Nov 2025	(Bulgaria) 2025 Denkova-Staviski Cup	9	52.32	8	93.47	7	145.79
13–16 Nov 2025	(Germany) 2025 NRW Trophy	2	50.80	3	96.42	3	147.22
26–30 Nov 2025	(United Kingdom) 2026 British Championships	2	49.72	2	98.13	2	147.85
13–18 Jan 2026	(United Kingdom) 2026 European Championships	31	46.11	—N/a	—N/a	31	46.11
27 Jan – 1 Feb 2026	(Poland) 2026 EDGE Cup	3	55.93	2	100.81	2	156.74
