= Eliška Březinová =

Czech figure skater (born 1996)

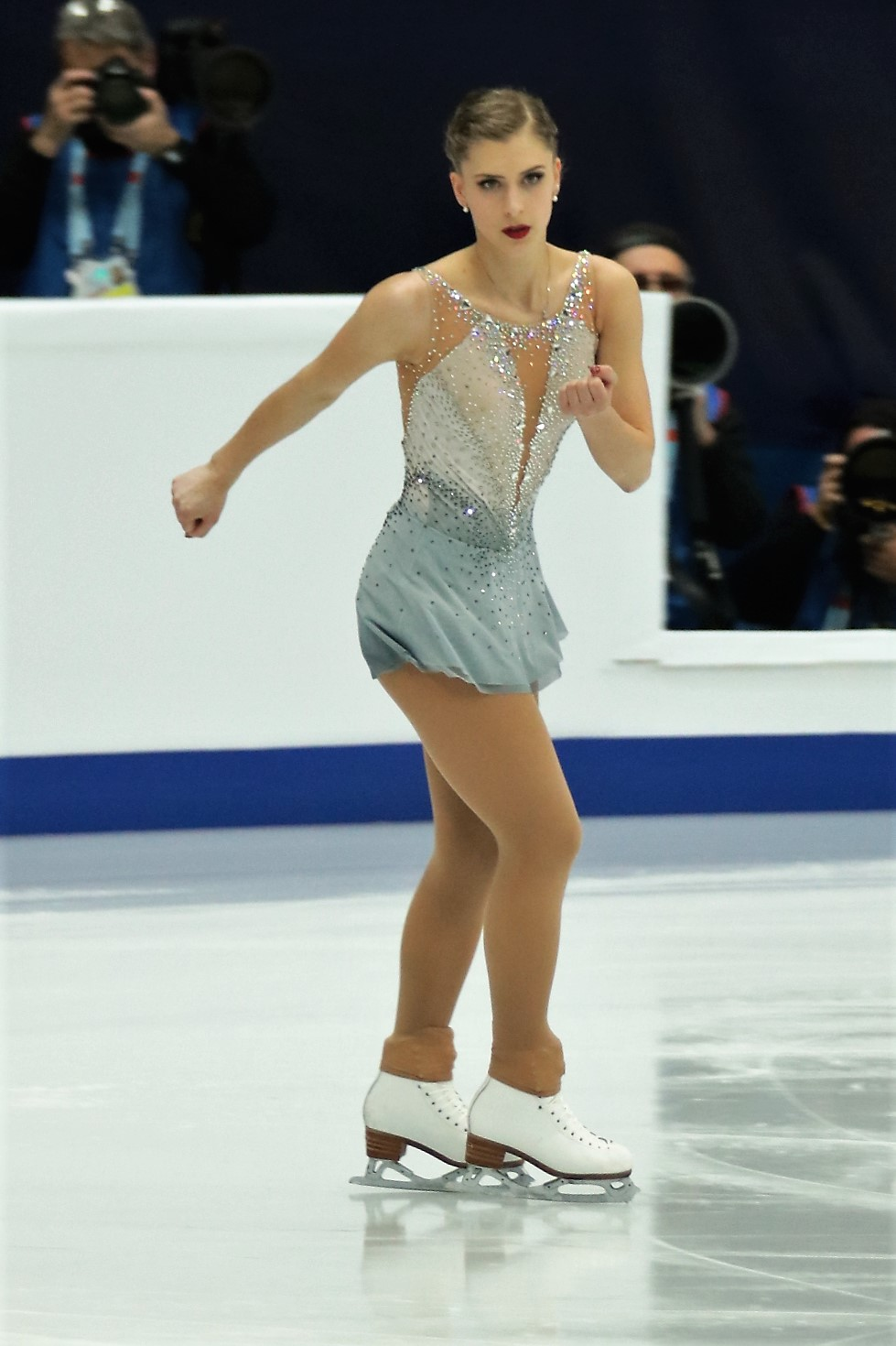
- Březinová at the 2018 European Championships

Personal information
- Born: 19 February 1996 (age 30) Brno, Czech Republic
- Height: 1.66 m (5 ft 5 in)

Figure skating career
- Country: Czech Republic
- Discipline: Women's singles
- Coach: Rafael Arutyunyan; Michal Březina
- Skating club: VSK Technika Brno
- Began skating: 2002
- Retired: March 2026
- Highest WS: 39th (2018–19)

Medal record
Event	Gold medal – first place	Silver medal – second place	Bronze medal – third place
Czech Championships	9	4	2
Medal list
Czech Championships
Gold medal – first place	2012 Ostrava	Singles
Gold medal – first place	2014 Bratislava	Singles
Gold medal – first place	2015 Budapest	Singles
Gold medal – first place	2016 Třinec	Singles
Gold medal – first place	2018 Košice	Singles
Gold medal – first place	2019 Budapest	Singles
Gold medal – first place	2020 Ostrava	Singles
Gold medal – first place	2021 Cieszyn	Singles
Gold medal – first place	2022 Spišská Nová Ves	Singles
Silver medal – second place	2017 Katowice	Singles
Silver medal – second place	2023 Budapest	Singles
Silver medal – second place	2024 Turnov	Singles
Silver medal – second place	2025 Cieszyn	Singles
Bronze medal – third place	2011 Žilina	Singles
Bronze medal – third place	2026 Presov	Singles

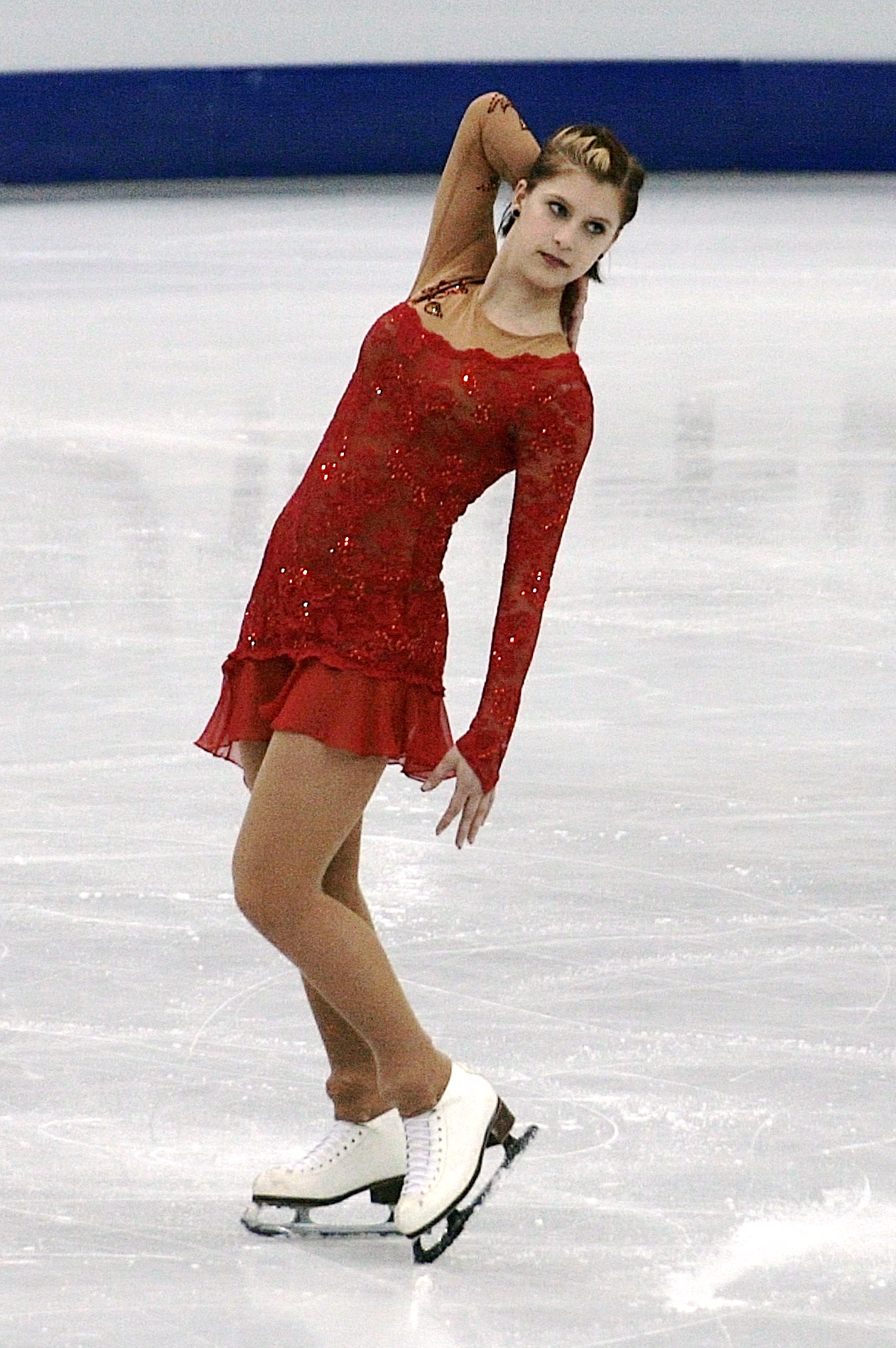
Březinová in 2012

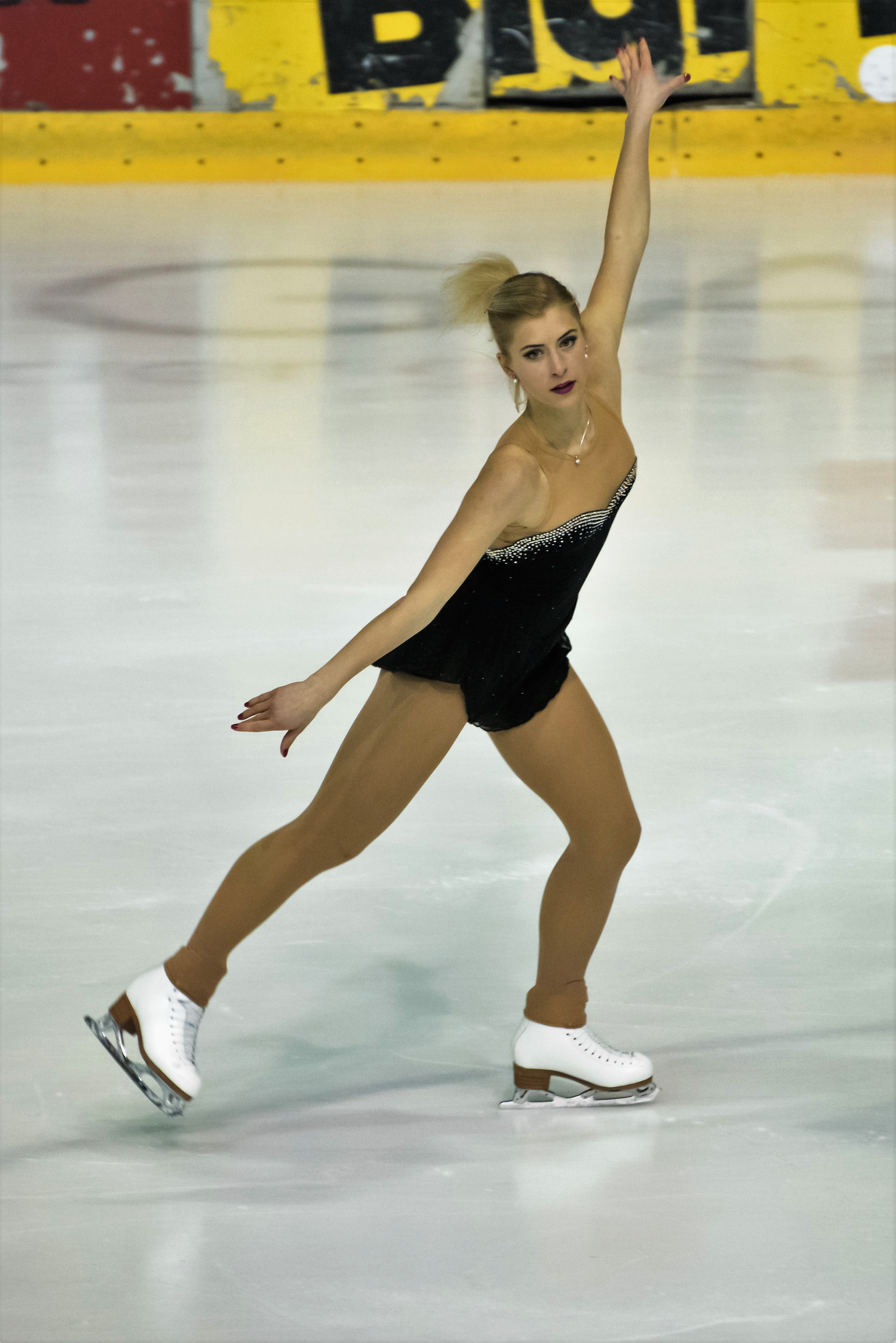
Březinová in 2017

Eliška Březinová (born 19 February 1996) is a retired Czech figure skater. She is the 2022 Skate Celje champion, the 2019 EduSport Trophy champion, a two-time Four Nationals champion (2014, 2018), and a nine-time Czech national champion (2012, 2014–2016, 2018–2022). She has competed in the final segment at eight ISU Championships, including three World Championships. She represented the Czech Republic at the 2022 Winter Olympics.

== Personal life ==
Eliška Březinová was born on 19 February 1996 in Brno, Czech Republic. She is the daughter of Edita and Rudolf Březina, a figure skating coach, and the younger sister of Michal Březina, a former competitor in men's singles.

== Career ==
Březinová began skating in 2002. She debuted on the ISU Junior Grand Prix series in 2010. In the 2011–2012 season, she became the Czech national senior champion and was sent to the European and World Championships but did not progress past the preliminary round at either event.

In the 2012–2013 season, Březinová dipped to fourth nationally and placed 30th in Zagreb at the 2013 European Championships, missing the cut-off for the free skate. She underwent ankle surgery in May 2013. She was coached by Karel Fajfr, along with her father, until the end of the season, and then by Ivan Rezek and her father beginning in the summer of 2013.

In the 2013–2014 season, Březinová won her second national title and reached the free skate at the 2014 European Championships in Budapest, where she finished fifteenth. She then qualified for the free skate at the 2014 World Championships in Saitama and finished eighteenth.

Březinová made her Grand Prix debut in the 2014–2015 season, having been assigned to the 2014 Trophée Éric Bompard. She won the Czech Figure Skating Championships for the third time. She finished fifteenth at the 2015 European Championships in Stockholm.

Competing at the 2021 World Championships, Březinová placed twenty-second. This result qualified a place for the Czech Republic at the 2022 Winter Olympics. In September 2021 she was named to the Czech Olympic team, joining her four-time Olympian brother for the first time. Březinová placed eighth in the short program segment of the Olympic team event, setting a new personal best score and breaking the 60-point mark for the first time. She performed still better in the short program of the women's event, scoring 64.31 to qualify for the free skate in twelfth position. Twenty-first in the free skate, she dropped to twentieth overall.

== Programs ==
Season	Short program	Free skating	Exhibition
2025–2026	I See Red by Everybody Loves an Outlaw; I See Red (Tut Tut Child Remix) by Everybody Loves an Outlaw choreo. by Beat Schümperli	In This Shirt by The Irrepressibles performed by The Irrepressibles & Louie Ashley choreo. by Beat Schümperli	Radar (Tonal Club Remix); Work Bitch by Britney Spears
2024–2025	Running Up That Hill (Epic Orchestral Version) (from Stranger Things) by Kate Bush choreo. by Benoît Richaud	Experience by Ludovico Einaudi; Circles by Ludovico Einaudi & Greta Svabo Bech choreo. by Benoît Richaud	
2023–2024	Running Up That Hill (Epic Orchestral Version) (from Stranger Things) by Kate Bush choreo. by Benoît Richaud	Collecting The Ballots; Zorro's Theme; The Plaza of Execution; I Want To Spend My Lifetime Loving You (from The Mask of Zorro) by James Horner arranged by Cedric Tour choreo. by Benoît Richaud	
2022–2023	Sweet Dreams (Are Made of This) performed by Emily Browning; Sweet Dreams by Eurythmics; Sweet Dreams performed by Trinix choreo. by Benoît Richaud	Collecting The Ballots; Zorro's Theme; The Plaza of Execution; I Want To Spend My Lifetime Loving You (from The Mask of Zorro) by James Horner arranged by Cedric Tour choreo. by Benoît Richaud	
2021–2022	Sweet Dreams (Are Made of This) performed by Emily Browning; Sweet Dreams by Eurythmics; Sweet Dreams performed by Trinix choreo. by Benoît Richaud	Experience by Ludovico Einaudi; Circles by Ludovico Einaudi & Greta Svabo Bech choreo. by Benoît Richaud	
2020–2021	Never Tear Us Apart by Andrew Farriss & Michael Hutchence performed by Bishop Briggs choreo. by Misha Ge	La La Land by Justin Hurwitz choreo. by Misha Ge	
2019–2020	Never Tear Us Apart by Andrew Farriss & Michael Hutchence performed by Bishop Briggs choreo. by Misha Ge	Survivor performed by 2WEI choreo. by Misha Ge	
2018–2019	Adagio by Remo Giazotto, Tomaso Albinoni performed by Lara Fabian choreo. by Nikolai Morozov	Survivor performed by 2WEI choreo. by Misha Ge	
2017–2018	Adagio by Remo Giazotto, Tomaso Albinoni performed by Lara Fabian choreo. by Nikolai Morozov	Lion by Dustin O'Halloran; Lion Theme; Searching For Home; River choreo. by Nikolai Morozov	
2016–2017	Fever by John Davenport & Eddie Cooley choreo. by Danielle Montalbano	Notre-Dame de Paris by Riccardo Cocciante choreo. by Salomé Brunner	
2015–2016	El Tango de Roxanne performed by Sting choreo. by Salomé Brunner	Notre-Dame de Paris by Riccardo Cocciante choreo. by Salomé Brunner	
2014–2015	Megapolis by Bel Suona choreo. by Salomé Brunner	The 13th Warrior by Jerry Goldsmith choreo. by Salomé Brunner	
2013–2014	Tango Amore by Edvin Marton	The 13th Warrior by Jerry Goldsmith choreo. by Salomé Brunner	
2012–2013	Tango Amore by Edvin Marton; El Dia Que Me Quieras (Tango) performed by Richard Clayderman	Crouching Tiger, Hidden Dragon by Tan Dun; Memoirs of a Geisha by John Williams	
2011–2012	Quidam (from Cirque du Soleil) by Benoît Jutras	The Cotton Club by John Barry	
2010–2011	Chiquitita by ABBA	The Cotton Club by John Barry	

== Competitive highlights ==
- GP – Event of the ISU Grand Prix Series
- JGP – Event of the ISU Junior Grand Prix Series
- CS – Event of the ISU Challenger Series
- WD – Withdrew from competition
- C – Event was cancelled

Competition placements at senior level
Season	2011–12	2012–13	2013–14	2014–15	2015–16	2016–17	2017–18	2018–19	2019–20	2020–21	2021–22	2022–23	2023–24	2024–25	2025–26
Winter Olympics											19th				
Winter Olympics (Team event)											8th				
World Championships	41st		18th	27th	29th		18th	20th	C	22nd	27th	32nd	28th		
European Championships	36th	30th	15th	15th	23rd		12th	10th	22nd		20th				
Czech Championships	1st	4th	1st	1st	1st	2nd	1st	1st	1st	1st	1st	2nd	2nd	2nd	3rd
Four Nationals Championships	7th	8th	1st	3rd	4th	4th	1st	2nd	4th	2nd	2nd	4th	5th	5th	7th
GP France				9th											
GP Rostelecom Cup				11th											
GP Skate America												10th			
GP Skate Canada												12th			
CS Autumn Classic								12th			9th		10th		
CS Cranberry Cup														10th	
CS Denis Ten Memorial													6th	12th	
CS Finlandia Trophy				10th	14th										
CS Golden Spin of Zagreb			9th								11th				
CS Ice Star							11th								
CS Kinoshita Group Cup															13th
CS Lombardia Trophy				16th	11th									19th	
CS Nebelhorn Trophy		16th								9th					
CS Nepela Memorial		3rd		6th	12th	WD	11th					WD			
CS Tallinn Trophy					11th										
CS Trialeti Trophy															19th
CS U.S. Classic								10th	11th			10th			
CS Warsaw Cup						27th									
Bavarian Open		16th											12th		
Bellu Memorial												7th			
Bosphorus Cup												3rd	3rd		
Celje Open										5th					
Challenge Cup		18th													
Crystal Skate of Romania								3rd						3rd	
Cup of Tyrol							10th								
Denkova-Staviski Cup									4th					15th	13th
Denver Cup															1st
Diamond Spin														2nd	3rd
Dragon Trophy			5th						4th						
EduSport Trophy								1st							
Golden Bear of Zagreb			7th			12th			8th						
Halloween Cup								5th	16th						
Hellmut Seibt Memorial		5th	7th	5th	7th										
Ice Challenge	16th														
Jégvirág Cup									3rd						
Mentor Cup							2nd								
Merano Cup		11th					6th								
Mladost Trophy		3rd													
New Year's Cup		5th	1st												
NRW Trophy	23rd														2nd
Santa Claus Cup					1st	7th				4th					
Skate Celje												1st			
Skate Helena						4th	1st							7th	
Slovenia Open			5th				5th								

Competition placements at junior level
Season	2009–10	2010–11	2011–12	2012–13
Czech Championships (Senior)		3rd		
Four Nationals Championships		8th		
Czech Championships (Junior)	3rd	6th	2nd	
JGP Austria			17th	20th
JGP Czech Republic		14th		
JGP Germany		26th		
European Youth Olympic Festival		20th		
Ice Challenge	12th	5th		

== Detailed results ==
ISU personal best scores in the +5/-5 GOE System
Segment	Type	Score	Event
Total	TSS	175.41	2022 Winter Olympics
Short program	TSS	64.31	2022 Winter Olympics
Short program	TES	35.74	2022 Winter Olympics
Short program	PCS	28.57	2022 Winter Olympics
Free skating	TSS	111.10	2022 Winter Olympics
Free skating	TES	55.25	2019 European Championships
Free skating	PCS	58.29	2022 Winter Olympics

ISU personal best scores in the +3/-3 GOE System
Segment	Type	Score	Event
Total	TSS	153.14	2018 World Championships
Short program	TSS	58.37	2018 World Championships
Short program	TES	32.55	2018 World Championships
Short program	PCS	25.82	2018 World Championships
Free skating	TSS	97.63	2018 European Championships
Free skating	TES	52.52	2015 European Championships
Free skating	PCS	50.76	2018 World Championships

=== Senior level ===
Results in the 2018-19 season
Date	Event	SP		FS		Total	
Date	Event	P	Score	P	Score	P	Score
Aug 3–5, 2018	(United States) 2018 CS U.S. International Figure Skating Classic	8	51.82	11	87.95	10	139.77
Sep 20–22, 2018	(Canada) 2018 CS Autumn Classic International	10	51.86	13	76.19	12	128.05
Oct 19–21, 2018	(Hungary) 2018 Halloween Cup	2	51.88	3	88.32	3	140.20
Oct 25–28, 2018	(Romania) 2018 Crystal Skate	4	50.64	5	90.28	5	140.92
Dec 14–15, 2018	(Hungary) 2019 Four Nationals Championships	2	56.10	4	89.39	2	145.49
Dec 14–15, 2018	(Hungary) 2019 Czech Championships (Note: In the Czech Republic, the Czech Championships are contested as part of the Four Nationals Championships.)	1	—N/a	1	—N/a	1	—N/a
Jan 9–12, 2019	(Romania) 2019 EduSport Trophy	1	54.19	1	102.65	1	156.84
Jan 21–27, 2019	(Belarus) 2019 European Championships	12	55.85	9	110.92	10	166.77
Mar 7–9, 2019	(Russia) 2019 Winter Universiade	14	50.49	14	89.60	13	140.09
Mar 18–24, 2019	(Japan) 2019 World Championships	18	57.13	20	96.32	20	153.45

Results in the 2019–20 season
Date	Event	SP		FS		Total	
Date	Event	P	Score	P	Score	P	Score
Sep 17–22, 2019	(United States) 2019 CS U.S. International Classic	11	39.36	11	75.48	11	114.84
Oct 17–20, 2019	(Hungary) 2019 Halloween Cup	8	47.43	17	74.05	16	121.48
Oct 24–27, 2019	(Croatia) 2019 Golden Bear of Zagreb	6	54.79	9	92.22	8	147.01
Nov 17, 2019	(Bulgaria) 2019 Denkova-Staviski Cup	4	50.72	4	82.39	4	133.11
Dec 13–14, 2019	(Czech Republic) 2020 Four Nationals Championships	2	56.85	9	81.46	4	138.31
Dec 13–14, 2019	(Czech Republic) 2020 Czech Championships	1	—N/a	3	—N/a	1	—N/a
Jan 20–26, 2020	(Austria) 2020 European Championships	19	53.61	22	91.74	22	145.35
Jan 30 – Feb 2, 2020	(Slovenia) 2020 Dragon Trophy	3	56.28	4	100.90	4	157.18
Feb 14–16, 2020	(Hungary) 2020 Jégvirág Cup	3	41.23	3	76.38	3	117.61

Results in the 2020–21 season
Date	Event	SP		FS		Total	
Date	Event	P	Score	P	Score	P	Score
Sep 23–26, 2020	(Germany) 2020 CS Nebelhorn Trophy	6	51.98	11	87.34	9	129.32
Nov 26–29, 2020	(Hungary) 2020 Santa Claus Cup	3	53.17	3	102.55	4	155.72
Dec 10–12, 2020	(Poland) 2021 Four Nationals Championships	5	46.84	2	100.00	2	146.84
Dec 10–12, 2020	(Poland) 2021 Czech Championships	2	—N/a	1	—N/a	1	—N/a
Feb 12–14, 2021	(Slovenia) 2021 Celje Open					5	
Mar 22–26, 2021	(Sweden) 2021 World Championships	21	58.81	22	96.33	22	155.14

Results in the 2021–22 season
Date	Event	SP		FS		Total	
Date	Event	P	Score	P	Score	P	Score
Sep 16–18, 2021	(Canada) 2021 CS Autumn Classic International	6	52.52	9	88.85	9	141.87
Oct 20–24, 2021	(France) 2021 Trophée Métropole Nice Côte d'Azur	4	52.13	2	111.82	2	163.95
Nov 6–7, 2021	(United Kingdom) 2021 Tayside Trophy	5	53.01	2	105.52	3	158.53
Dec 7–11, 2021	(Croatia) 2021 CS Golden Spin of Zagreb	7	55.27	11	95.56	11	150.83
Dec 17–18, 2021	(Slovakia) 2022 Four Nationals Championships	3	58.56	3	110.27	2	168.83
Dec 17–18, 2021	(Slovakia) 2022 Czech Championships	1	—N/a	1	—N/a	1	—N/a
Jan 13–15, 2022	(Estonia) 2022 European Championships	13	59.62	21	95.62	21	155.24
Feb 4–7, 2022	(China) 2022 Winter Olympics (Team event)	8	61.05	—N/a	—N/a	8	—N/a
Feb 15–17, 2022	(China) 2022 Winter Olympics	11	64.31	20	111.10	19	175.41
Mar 21–27, 2022	(France) 2022 World Championships	27	55.07	—N/a	—N/a	27	55.07

Results in the 2022–23 season
Date	Event	SP		FS		Total	
Date	Event	P	Score	P	Score	P	Score
Sep 12–16, 2022	(United States) 2022 U.S International Classic	10	43.03	8	86.12	10	129.15
Sep 29 – Oct 1, 2022	(Slovakia) 2022 CS Nepela Memorial	15	34.25	—N/a	—N/a	–	WD
Oct 15–16, 2022	(United Kingdom) 2022 Tayside Trophy	1	60.16	4	99.31	2	159.47
Oct 21–23, 2022	(United States) 2022 Skate America	9	56.65	10	96.92	10	153.57
Oct 28–20, 2022	2022 Skate Canada International	11	55.14	12	103.89	12	159.03
Nov 15–20, 2022	(Slovenia) 2022 Skate Celje	1	59.06	1	108.49	1	167.55
Nov 29 – Dec 3, 2022	(Turkey) 2022 Bosphorus Cup	8	47.99	1	116.33	3	164.32
Dec 15–17, 2022	(Hungary) 2023 Four Nationals Championships	7	48.74	4	103.67	4	152.41
Dec 15–17, 2022	(Hungary) 2023 Czech Championships	2	—N/a	2	—N/a	2	—N/a
Feb 24–26, 2023	(Romania) 2023 Bellu Memorial	7	43.53	6	86.24	7	129.77
Mar 22–26, 2023	(Japan) 2023 World Championships	32	47.29	—N/a	—N/a	32	47.29

Results in the 2023–24 season
Date	Event	SP		FS		Total	
Date	Event	P	Score	P	Score	P	Score
Sep 14–17, 2023	(Canada) 2023 CS Autumn Classic International	7	49.84	11	75.72	10	125.56
Oct 14–15, 2023	(United Kingdom) 2023 Tayside Trophy	2	50.96	6	77.44	4	128.40
Nov 2–5, 2023	(Kazakhstan) 2023 CS Denis Ten Memorial Challenge	9	47.22	6	95.87	6	143.09
Nov 27 – Dec 3, 2023	(Turkey) 2023 Bosphorus Cup	9	42.09	2	103.44	3	145.53
Dec 14–16, 2023	(Czech Republic) 2024 Four Nationals Championships	2	57.71	6	86.41	5	144.12
Dec 14–16, 2023	(Czech Republic) 2024 Czech Championships	1	—N/a	2	—N/a	2	—N/a
Jan 30 – Feb 4, 2024	(Germany) 2024 Bavarian Open	12	41.46	12	77.92	12	119.38
Mar 18–24, 2024	(Canada) 2024 World Championships	28	50.90	—N/a	—N/a	28	50.90

Results in the 2024–25 season
Date	Event	SP		FS		Total	
Date	Event	P	Score	P	Score	P	Score
Aug 8–11, 2025	(United States) 2024 CS Cranberry Cup International	7	52.38	11	73.77	10	126.15
Sep 12–15, 2025	(Italy) 2024 CS Lombardia Trophy	15	44.51	19	72.35	19	116.86
Oct 12–13, 2024	(United Kingdom) 2024 Tayside Trophy	6	52.74	8	80.72	7	133.46
Oct 15–20, 2024	(Poland) 2024 Diamond Spin	4	49.29	1	97.48	2	146.77
Oct 23–27, 2024	2024 Crystal Skate of Romania	2	51.46	3	79.94	3	131.40
Nov 1–3, 2024	(Slovakia) 2024 Tirnavia Ice Cup	2	51.81	4	98.49	2	150.30
Nov 5–10, 2024	(Bulgaria) 2024 Denkova-Staviski Cup	18	43.67	14	93.16	15	136.83
Nov 14–17, 2024	(Slovenia) 2024 Skate Celje	9	41.70	6	88.83	7	130.53
Dec 13–15, 2024	(Poland) 2025 Four Nationals Championships	2	57.71	6	86.41	5	144.12
Dec 13–15, 2024	(Poland) 2025 Czech Championships	1	—N/a	2	—N/a	2	—N/a
Jan 7—12, 2025	(Bulgaria) 2025 Sofia Trophy	17	45.81	19	75.94	18	121.75
Jan 16—19, 2025	(Latvia) 2025 Volvo Open Cup	7	40.58	6	82.59	6	123.17

Results in the 2025–26 season
Date	Event	SP		FS		Total	
Date	Event	P	Score	P	Score	P	Score
Sep 5–7, 2025	(Japan) 2025 CS Kinoshita Group Cup	13	50.05	12	90.63	13	140.68
Oct 8–11, 2025	(Georgia (country)) 2025 CS Trialeti Trophy	9	53.25	19	87.93	19	141.18
Oct 16–19, 2025	(Poland) 2025 Diamond Spin	3	58.18	5	98.04	3	156.22
Nov 7–9, 2025	(Bulgaria) 2025 Denkova-Staviski Cup	7	52.58	15	80.37	13	132.95
Nov 13–16, 2025	(Germany) 2025 NRW Trophy	3	49.44	2	101.06	2	150.50
Dec 11-13, 2025	(Slovakia) 2026 Four Nationals Championships	5	51.25	7	85.72	7	136.97
Dec 11-13, 2025	(Czech Republic) 2026 Czech Championships	2	—N/a	3	—N/a	3	—N/a
Mar 11-13, 2026	(United States) 2026 Denver International Cup	1	48.61	1	86.64	1	135.25

2015–16 season
Event	SP	FS	Total
2015 Tallinn Trophy			
2015 Finlandia Trophy			
2015 Ondrej Nepela Trophy			
2015 Lombardia Trophy			
2014–15 season
Event	SP	FS	Total
2015 World Championships	27; 43.37	–	27; 43.37
2015 Hellmut Seibt Memorial			
2015 European Championships			
2015 Four National Championships	2; 48.14	3; 91.31	3; 139.45
2014 Trophée Éric Bompard	10; 48.28	9; 96.01	9; 144.29
2014 Rostelecom Cup			
2014 Finlandia Trophy			
2014 Ondrej Nepela Trophy			
2014 Lombardia Trophy			
