= Igor Reznichenko =

Ukrainian figure skater

Ihor Reznichenko
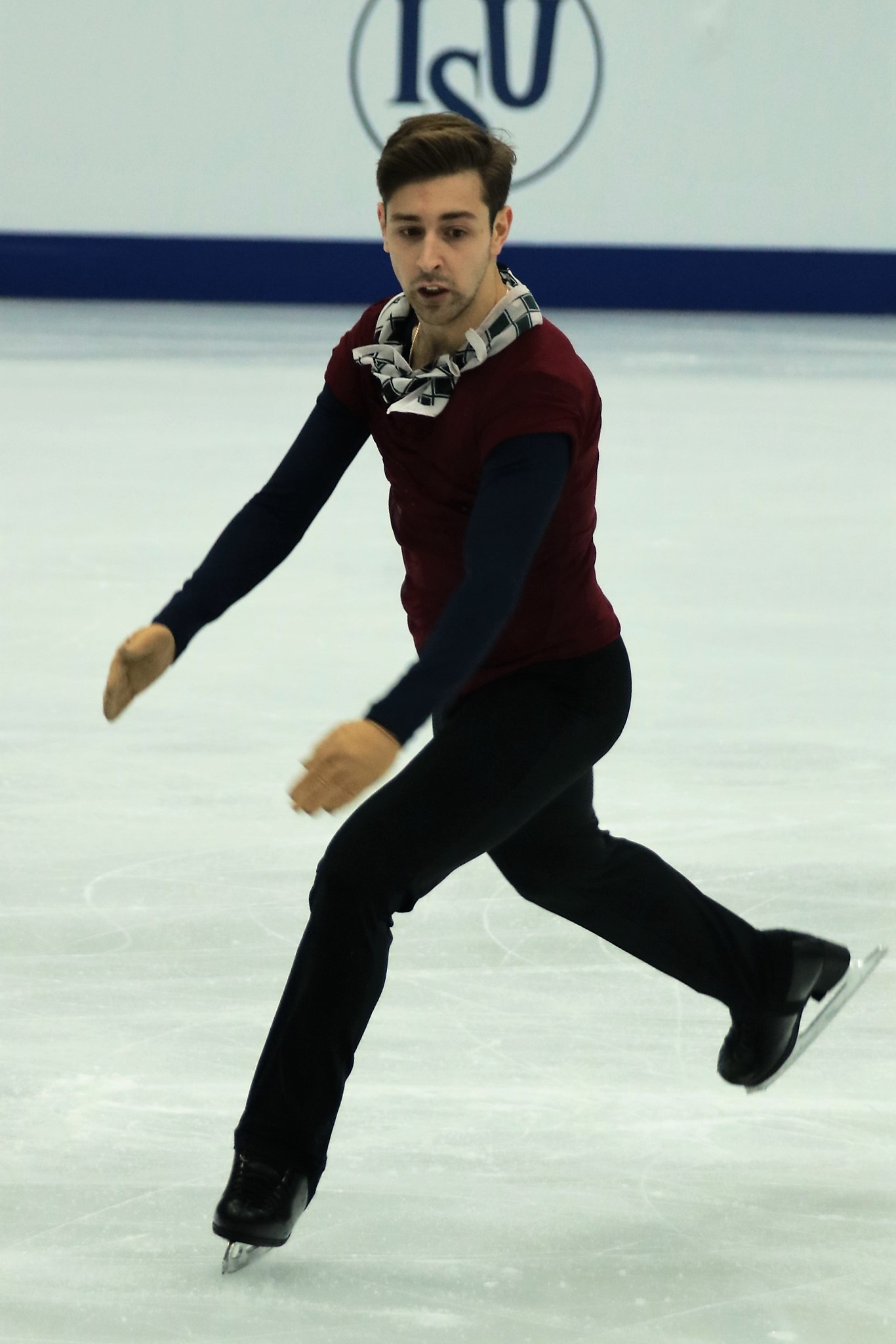

Personal information
- Native name: Ігор Резніченко
- Other names: Igor Reznichenko
- Born: 30 December 1994 (age 31) Dnipro, Ukraine
- Height: 1.69 m (5 ft 6 1/2 in)

Figure skating career
- Country: Poland (since 2015)
- Discipline: Men's singles
- Began skating: 1999
- Retired: November 7, 2020

Medal record
Representing Poland
Polish Championships
Gold medal – first place	2016 Třinec	Singles
Gold medal – first place	2018 Košice	Singles
Gold medal – first place	2019 Budapest	Singles
Silver medal – second place	2017 Katowice	Singles

Ihor Reznichenko (Ukrainian: Ігор Резніченко, Polish: Igor Rezniczenko; born 30 December 1994) is a former Ukrainian figure skater who competed for Poland. He is the 2017 Slovenia Open champion and a three-time Polish national champion (2016, 2018, 2019). He has represented Poland at three World Championships and competed in the final segment at the 2018 European Championships.

== Personal life ==
Reznicheno was born on 30 December 1994 in Dnipro, Ukraine.

== Career for Ukraine ==
=== Early years ===
Reznichenko began learning to skate in 1999. He debuted on the ISU Junior Grand Prix series in September 2008, in Ostrava, Czech Republic. He also competed on the JGP series in 2009, 2011, and 2013.

He trained under Ludmyla Petrovska early in his career. By the 2009–2010 season, he was coached by Olena Ferafontova in Dnipro, Ukraine. By the 2011–2012 season, he was training in Kyiv under Halyna Kukhar and Olena Amosova.

=== 2012–2013 season ===
Reznichenko's senior international debut came at the NRW Trophy in December 2012. Later that month, he won the bronze medal at the Ukrainian Championships. Dmytro Shkidchenko and Halyna Kukhar coached him in Kyiv.

=== 2013–2014 season ===
Making his last international appearance for Ukraine, he placed 11th at the Winter Universiade, held in December 2013 in Trento, Italy. A week later, he took the silver medal at the Ukrainian Championships. He was coached by Shkidchenko.

== Career for Poland ==
=== 2015–2016 season ===
In December 2015, Reznichenko won the Polish national title at the 2016 Four Nationals. He made no international appearances during the season.

=== 2016–2017 season ===
Reznichenko debuted internationally for Poland at the 2016 CS Ondrej Nepela Memorial, held in late September and early October 2016, and finished 9th. He placed 4th at the 2016 CS Warsaw Cup and then won the silver medal at the 2017 Polish Championships.

Reznichenko placed 25th at the 2017 European Championships in Ostrava, Czech Republic, just missing a spot in the final segment. He ranked 29th at the 2017 World Championships in Helsinki, Finland. He was coached by Evgeni Rukavicin and Galina Kashina in Saint Petersburg, Russia.

=== 2017–2018 season ===
In September 2017, Reznichenko won gold at the Slovenia Open. As a result, Poland assigned him to compete at the 2017 CS Nebelhorn Trophy, the final qualifying opportunity for the 2018 Winter Olympics. His placement in Germany, 11th, was insufficient to earn an Olympic spot.

Reznichenko qualified to the free skate at the 2018 European Championships in Moscow.

== Programs ==
Season	Short program	Free skating
2018–2019	Give Me Love by Ed Sheeran	Mala Luna
2017–2018	Give Me Love by Ed Sheeran	La Strada by Nino Rota
2016–2017	Flow Like Water (from The Last Airbender) by James Newton Howard	La Strada by Nino Rota
2013–2014	Beethoven's Last Night by Trans-Siberian Orchestra	The Man in the Iron Mask by Nick Glennie-Smith
2012–2013	Blues	The Man in the Iron Mask by Nick Glennie-Smith
2011–2012	Blues	Don Quixote by Ludwig Minkus
2009–2010	Art on Ice by Edvin Marton	Love is War by Y. Goren

== Competitive highlights ==
CS: Challenger Series; JGP: Junior Grand Prix

=== For Poland ===
International
Event	15–16	16–17	17–18	18–19
Worlds		29th	36th	35th
Europeans		25th	24th	25th
CS Alpen Trophy				20th
CS Ice Star			13th	
CS Lombardia				13th
CS Nebelhorn			11th	
CS Ondrej Nepela		9th		
CS Warsaw Cup		4th	5th	
Cup of Nice		10th		
Denkova-Staviski Cup				5th
Dragon Trophy				9th
Ice Star				5th
Golden Bear				6th
Slovenia Open			1st	
Warsaw Cup				5th
National
Polish Champ.	1st	2nd	1st	1st

=== For Ukraine ===
International
Event	08–09	09–10	10–11	11–12	12–13	13–14
Cup of Nice						11th
NRW Trophy					15th	
Ondrej Nepela						9th
Winter Universiade						11th
International: Junior
JGP Czech Republic	23rd					
JGP Hungary		11th				
JGP Italy				12th		
JGP Latvia						12th
JGP Poland				12th		8th
NRW Trophy				4th		
Tirnavia Ice Cup			3rd			
National
Ukrainian Champ.			5th	4th	3rd	2nd
