= Danielle Harrison =

British figure skater

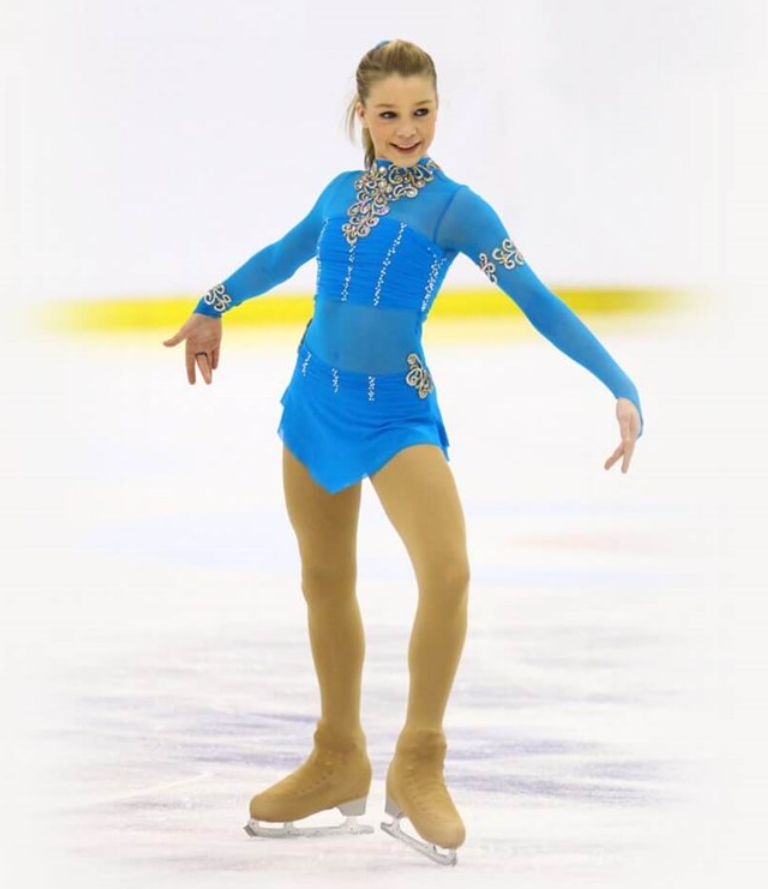
- Harrison in 2015

Personal information
- Born: 15 November 1999 (age 26) Basingstoke, Hampshire, England
- Home town: Basingstoke, England
- Height: 1.58 m (5 ft 2 in)

Figure skating career
- Country: United Kingdom
- Coach: Simon Briggs, Debi Briggs
- Skating club: Dundee
- Began skating: 2006
- Retired: April 18, 2022

Danielle Harrison (born 15 November 1999) is a retired English figure skater. She won the British senior national title in December 2015.

== Personal life ==
Danielle Harrison was born on 15 November 1999 in Basingstoke, England. The daughter of Pam and Mark Harrison, she is the youngest of four children. She attended Castle Hill Junior School and later Everest Community Academy.

== Career ==
=== Early career ===
Harrison began taking skating lessons in March 2006. In her early years, she was taught by Jenny Woolford at Basingstoke Arena. Harrison was awarded the novice bronze medal at the British Championships in the 2011–12 season and silver the following year, coached by Debi and Simon Briggs with support from Gary Peed, Peter Bækgaard, Andrew Smith and Lisa Beaumont. She won the British junior silver medal in the 2013–14 season.

=== 2014–2015 season ===
Harrison debuted on the ISU Junior Grand Prix (JGP) series at the start of the 2014–15 season, placing 15th in the Czech Republic and 14th in Estonia. In November 2014, she won the junior gold medal at the British Championships after placing first in the short program and third in the free skate. She also finished first at the Bavarian Open in February 2015, competing in Junior Ladies group I. Having attained the minimum technical scores, she was sent to the World Junior Championships in Tallinn, Estonia in March 2015. Her short program result, 27th, was insufficient to advance to the free skate.

=== 2015–2016 season ===
Harrison continued on the JGP series, finishing 20th in Poland and 17th in Spain. Making her senior international debut, she placed 7th at the Volvo Open Cup. In December, she became the British national senior champion, finishing just ahead of Zoe Wilkinson. At the 2016 European Championships in Bratislava, she placed 29th in the short program and did not advance to the free skate.

== Programs ==
| Season | Short program | Free skating |
|---|---|---|
| 2019–2020 | Praise You by Camille Yarbrough, Norman Cook performed by Hannah Grace | Adagio of Spartacus and Phrygia (from Spartacus) by Aram Khachaturian |
| 2018–2019 | Praise You by Camille Yarbrough, Norman Cook performed by Hannah Grace | A Time For Us (from Romeo and Juliet) by Nino Rota; Cheek of the Night (from Romeo & Juliet) by Abel Korzeniowski; Dance of the Knights (from Romeo and Juliet) by Sergei Prokofiev |
| 2017–2018 | Hallelujah by Leonard Cohen | A Time For Us (from Romeo and Juliet) by Nino Rota; Cheek of the Night (from Romeo & Juliet) by Abel Korzeniowski; Dance of the Knights (from Romeo and Juliet) by Sergei Prokofiev |
| 2016–2017 | Molitva by Vladimir Graić | Carmen by Georges Bizet |
| 2015–2016 | Molitva by Vladimir Graić; Suns and Stars (Pan trailer) by Cesc vilá Aullina | Scheherazade by Nikolai Rimsky-Korsakov |
| 2014–2015 | The Legend of Zelda by Koji Kondo | Danse Bacchanale (from Samson and Delilah) by Camille Saint-Saëns |

== Competitive highlights ==
CS: Challenger Series; JGP: Junior Grand Prix

International
| Event | 13–14 | 14–15 | 15–16 | 16–17 | 17–18 | 18–19 | 19–20 | 21–22 |
|---|---|---|---|---|---|---|---|---|
| Europeans | | | 29th | | | | | |
| CS Finlandia | | | | 11th | 19th | | | |
| CS Ondrej Nepela | | | | | 15th | 12th | 16th | |
| Crystal Skate | | | | | | 7th | | |
| Cup of Nice | | | | | | | | 12th |
| Golden Bear | | | | | | | 17th | |
| Sportland Trophy | | | 6th | | | | | |
| Tayside Trophy | | | | | | | 4th | 8th |
| Toruń Cup | | | 15th | | | | | |
| Volvo Open Cup | | | 7th | | 3rd | | 22nd | |
International: Junior
| Junior Worlds | | 27th | 36th | | | | | |
| JGP Czech Rep. | | 15th | | | | | | |
| JGP Estonia | | 14th | | 15th | | | | |
| JGP Poland | | | 20th | | | | | |
| JGP Spain | | | 17th | | | | | |
| Bavarian Open | | 1st | 2nd | | | | | |
| Cup of Nice | | 3rd | 6th | | | | | |
| EYOF | | 10th | | | | | | |
| Santa Claus Cup | 4th | | | | | | | |
| Volvo Open Cup | 11th | 8th | | | | | | |
National
| British Champ. | 2nd J | 1st J | 1st | 3rd | 4th | | 3rd | 5th |
J = Junior
