= Patrick Myzyk =

Polish figure skater

Personal information
- Born: January 5, 1991 (age 35) Toronto, Ontario, Canada
- Height: 1.70 m (5 ft 7 in)

Figure skating career
- Country: Poland
- Discipline: Men's singles
- Coach: Lee Barkell
- Skating club: GKS Stoczniowiec Gdańsk
- Began skating: 1996

Medal record
Polish Championships
Gold medal – first place	2013 Cieszyn	Singles
Gold medal – first place	2015 Budapest	Singles
Silver medal – second place	2016 Třinec	Singles
Bronze medal – third place	2011 Žilina	Singles

Patrick Myzyk (born January 5, 1991) is a Polish figure skater. He is the 2013 and 2015 Polish national champion. He was assigned to the 2015 European Championships in Stockholm, Sweden and qualified for the free skate.

Myzyk was born in Toronto, Ontario, Canada. His mother is from Gdańsk and his father from Toruń.

== Programs ==
Season	Short program	Free skating
2014–16	Come Together by The Beatles; Black Betty by Ram Jam	Exotica (from Cirque du Soleil)

== Competitive highlights ==
CS: Challenger Series

Event	09–10	10–11	11–12	12–13	13–14	14–15	15–16	16–17
European Championships						20th	30th	
Polish Championships		3rd	5th	1st		1st	2nd	4th
Canadian Championships	15th J	15th						
CS Autumn Classic						12th	10th	
CS Golden Spin of Zagreb								17th
CS Ice Challenge			10th	16th		8th		
CS Nepela Trophy			15th				10th	
CS Warsaw Cup					8th	6th	17th	WD
Bavarian Open			13th	25th				
Cup of Nice			13th	14th				
Toruń Cup							7th	
U.S. Classic				11th				
