= 2014–15 ISU Challenger Series =

- Type: ISU Challenger Series
- Date: September 10 – December 7, 2014
- Season: 2014–15
- Next: 2015–16 ISU Challenger Series

The 2014–15 ISU Challenger Series was held from September to December 2014. It was the inaugural season of the ISU Challenger Series: a group of senior-level international figure skating competitions.

== Competitions ==
This season, the series included the following events. The 2014 Triglav Trophy was originally scheduled for November 6–9, 2014, but it was removed from the calendar as a Challenger Series event.

Date	Event	Location	Results
September 10–14	(United States) 2014 U.S. International Classic	Salt Lake City, Utah, United States	Details
September 18–21	(Italy) 2014 Lombardia Trophy	Sesto San Giovanni, Italy	Details
September 25–27	(Germany) 2014 Nebelhorn Trophy	Oberstdorf, Germany	Details
October 2–5	(Slovakia) 2014 Ondrej Nepela Trophy	Bratislava, Slovakia	Details
October 9–12	(Finland) 2014 Finlandia Trophy	Espoo, Finland	Details
October 15–18	2014 Skate Canada Autumn Classic	Barrie, Ontario, Canada	Details
November 5–9	(Latvia) 2014 Volvo Open Cup	Riga, Latvia	Details
November 6–9	(Slovenia) 2014 Triglav Trophy	No longer a Challenger Series event	
November 11–16	(Austria) 2014 Ice Challenge	Graz, Austria	Details
November 21–24	(Poland) 2014 Warsaw Cup	Warsaw, Poland	Details
December 4–7	(Croatia) 2014 Golden Spin of Zagreb	Zagreb, Croatia	Details

== Medal summary ==
=== Men's singles ===
Competition	Gold	Silver	Bronze	Results
(United States) U.S. International Classic	(United States) Max Aaron	(United States) Ross Miner	(Japan) Daisuke Murakami	Details
(Italy) Lombardia Trophy	(United States) Richard Dornbush	(Japan) Takahito Mura	(Russia) Adian Pitkeev	Details
(Germany) Nebelhorn Trophy	(United States) Jason Brown	(Czech Republic) Michal Březina	(Russia) Konstantin Menshov	Details
(Slovakia) Ondrej Nepela Trophy	(United States) Stephen Carriere	(South Korea) Kim Jin-seo	(Russia) Gordei Gorshkov	Details
(Finland) Finlandia Trophy	(Russia) Sergei Voronov	(United States) Adam Rippon	(Russia) Alexander Petrov	Details
Skate Canada Autumn Classic	(United States) Ross Miner	(Canada) Nam Nguyen	(Canada) Jeremy Ten	Details
(Latvia) Volvo Open Cup	(Russia) Alexander Petrov	(Russia) Gordei Gorshkov	(Russia) Artur Dmitriev Jr.	Details
(Austria) Ice Challenge	(United States) Douglas Razzano	(Russia) Alexander Samarin	(Germany) Martin Rappe	Details
(Poland) Warsaw Cup	(Russia) Alexander Petrov	(Philippines) Michael Christian Martinez	(Italy) Matteo Rizzo	Details
(Croatia) Golden Spin of Zagreb	(Kazakhstan) Denis Ten	(Czech Republic) Michal Březina	(Russia) Konstantin Menshov	Details

=== Ladies' singles ===
Competition	Gold	Silver	Bronze	Results
(United States) U.S. International Classic	(United States) Polina Edmunds	(United States) Courtney Hicks	(Japan) Riona Kato	Details
(Italy) Lombardia Trophy	(Japan) Satoko Miyahara	(United States) Hannah Miller	(United States) Angela Wang	Details
(Germany) Nebelhorn Trophy	(Russia) Elizaveta Tuktamysheva	(Russia) Alena Leonova	(United States) Gracie Gold	Details
(Slovakia) Ondrej Nepela Trophy	(Italy) Roberta Rodeghiero	(Sweden) Joshi Helgesson	(United States) Ashley Cain	Details
(Finland) Finlandia Trophy	(Russia) Elizaveta Tuktamysheva	(United States) Samantha Cesario	(Japan) Rika Hongo	Details
Skate Canada Autumn Classic	(Canada) Gabrielle Daleman	(United States) Angela Wang	(Canada) Julianne Séguin	Details
(Latvia) Volvo Open Cup	(Latvia) Angelīna Kučvaļska	(Germany) Lutricia Bock	(Finland) Jenni Saarinen	Details
(Austria) Ice Challenge	(United States) Hannah Miller	(Sweden) Isabelle Olsson	(Hungary) Ivett Tóth	Details
(Poland) Warsaw Cup	(Russia) Elizaveta Tuktamysheva	(Armenia) Anastasia Galustyan	(Lithuania) Aleksandra Golovkina	Details
(Croatia) Golden Spin of Zagreb	(Finland) Kiira Korpi	(Russia) Maria Artemieva	(Slovakia) Nicole Rajičová	Details

=== Pairs ===
Competition	Gold	Silver	Bronze	Results
(United States) U.S. International Classic	(United States) Alexa Scimeca / Chris Knierim	(United States) Jessica Calalang / Zack Sidhu	(United States) Madeline Aaron / Max Settlage	Details
(Italy) Lombardia Trophy	(United States) Haven Denney / Brandon Frazier	(Italy) Bianca Manacorda / Niccolo Macii	(Russia) Vera Bazarova / Andrei Deputat	Details
(Germany) Nebelhorn Trophy	(Russia) Yuko Kavaguti / Alexander Smirnov	(Russia) Evgenia Tarasova / Vladimir Morozov	(United States) Alexa Scimeca / Chris Knierim	Details
Skate Canada Autumn Classic	(Canada) Meagan Duhamel / Eric Radford	(United States) Haven Denney / Brandon Frazier	(United States) Jessica Calalang / Zack Sidhu	Details
(Latvia) Volvo Open Cup	(Russia) Kristina Astakhova / Alexei Rogonov	(Russia) Maria Vigalova / Egor Zakroev	(Belarus) Maria Paliakova / Nikita Bochkov	Details
(Austria) Ice Challenge	(Russia) Lina Fedorova / Maxim Miroshkin	(Austria) Miriam Ziegler / Severin Kiefer	(Germany) Mari Vartmann / Aaron Van Cleave	Details
(Poland) Warsaw Cup	(Canada) Lubov Iliushechkina / Dylan Moscovitch	(Russia) Lina Fedorova / Maxim Miroshkin	(Italy) Valentina Marchei / Ondřej Hotárek	Details
(Croatia) Golden Spin of Zagreb	(Russia) Kristina Astakhova / Alexei Rogonov	(Italy) Valentina Marchei / Ondřej Hotárek	(United States) Tarah Kayne / Daniel O'Shea	Details

=== Ice dance ===
Competition	Gold	Silver	Bronze	Results
(United States) U.S. International Classic	(United States) Alexandra Aldridge / Daniel Eaton	(Canada) Nicole Orford / Thomas Williams	(United States) Anastasia Cannuscio / Colin McManus	Details
(Germany) Nebelhorn Trophy	(Canada) Kaitlyn Weaver / Andrew Poje	(United States) Madison Chock / Evan Bates	(Germany) Nelli Zhiganshina / Alexander Gazsi	Details
(Slovakia) Ondrej Nepela Trophy	(United States) Maia Shibutani / Alex Shibutani	(Italy) Charlène Guignard / Marco Fabbri	(Slovakia) Federica Testa / Lukáš Csölley	Details
(Finland) Finlandia Trophy	(Russia) Alexandra Stepanova / Ivan Bukin	(Germany) Nelli Zhiganshina / Alexander Gazsi	(United States) Anastasia Cannuscio / Colin McManus	Details
Skate Canada Autumn Classic	(France) Gabriella Papadakis / Guillaume Cizeron	(Canada) Piper Gilles / Paul Poirier	(Denmark) Laurence Fournier Beaudry / Nikolaj Sørensen	Details
(Latvia) Volvo Open Cup	(Slovakia) Federica Testa / Lukáš Csölley	(Belarus) Viktoria Kavaliova / Yurii Bieliaiev	(South Korea) Rebeka Kim / Kirill Minov	Details
(Austria) Ice Challenge	(United States) Maia Shibutani / Alex Shibutani	(Denmark) Laurence Fournier Beaudry / Nikolaj Sørensen	(Austria) Barbora Silná / Juri Kurakin	Details
(Poland) Warsaw Cup	(Slovakia) Federica Testa / Lukáš Csölley	(Ukraine) Alexandra Nazarova / Maksym Nikitin	(China) Wang Shiyue / Liu Xinyu	Details
(Croatia) Golden Spin of Zagreb	(United States) Madison Hubbell / Zachary Donohue	(Italy) Charlène Guignard / Marco Fabbri	(Spain) Sara Hurtado / Adrián Díaz	Details

== Medal standings ==
Rank	Nation	Gold	Silver	Bronze	Total
1	United States (USA)	14	9	9	32
2	Russia (RUS)	11	7	7	25
3	Canada (CAN)	4	3	2	9
4	Slovakia (SVK)	2	0	2	4
5	Italy (ITA)	1	4	2	7
6	Japan (JPN)	1	1	3	5
7	Finland (FIN)	1	0	1	2
8	France (FRA)	1	0	0	1
8	Kazakhstan (KAZ)	1	0	0	1
8	Latvia (LAT)	1	0	0	1
11	Germany (GER)	0	2	3	5
12	Czech Republic (CZE)	0	2	0	2
12	Sweden (SWE)	0	2	0	2
14	Austria (AUT)	0	1	1	2
14	Belarus (BLR)	0	1	1	2
14	Denmark (DEN)	0	1	1	2
14	South Korea (KOR)	0	1	1	2
18	Armenia (ARM)	0	1	0	1
18	Philippines (PHI)	0	1	0	1
18	Ukraine (UKR)	0	1	0	1
21	China (CHN)	0	0	1	1
21	Hungary (HUN)	0	0	1	1
21	Lithuania (LTU)	0	0	1	1
21	Spain (ESP)	0	0	1	1
Totals (24 entries)		37	37	37	111

== Challenger Series rankings ==
The ISU Challenger Series rankings were formed by combining the two highest final scores of each skater or team.

=== Men's singles ===
No.	Skater	Nation	First event	Score	Second event	Score	Total score
1	Michal Březina	Czech Republic	Nebelhorn Trophy	228.48	Golden Spin of Zagreb	239.62	468.10
2	Alexander Petrov	Russia	Volvo Open Cup	218.78	Warsaw Cup	231.53	450.31
3	Konstantin Menshov	Russia	Nebelhorn Trophy	211.03	Golden Spin of Zagreb	229.51	440.54
4	Ross Miner	United States	U.S. International Classic	209.78	Skate Canada Autumn Classic	227.26	437.04
5	Sergei Voronov	Russia	Nebelhorn Trophy	210.05	Finlandia Trophy	221.11	431.16

=== Ladies' singles ===
No.	Skater	Nation	First event	Score	Second event	Score	Total score
1	Elizaveta Tuktamysheva	Russia	Finlandia Trophy	193.31	Warsaw Cup	196.66	389.97
2	Alena Leonova	Russia	Nebelhorn Trophy	186.71	Ice Challenge	148.29	335.00
3	Hannah Miller	United States	Lombardia Trophy	170.26	Ice Challenge	156.39	326.65
4	Angela Wang	United States	Lombardia Trophy	160.25	Skate Canada Autumn Classic	163.68	323.93
5	Maria Artemieva	Russia	Finlandia Trophy	140.38	Golden Spin of Zagreb	166.48	306.86

=== Pairs ===
No.	Team	Nation	First event	Score	Second event	Score	Total score
1	Alexa Scimeca / Chris Knierim	United States	U.S. International Classic	163.24	Nebelhorn Trophy	166.10	329.34
2	Haven Denney / Brandon Frazier	United States	Lombardia Trophy	157.80	Skate Canada Autumn Classic	167.28	325.08
3	Jessica Calalang / Zack Sidhu	United States	U.S. International Classic	156.18	Skate Canada Autumn Classic	156.46	312.64
4	Vanessa Grenier / Maxime Deschamps	Canada	Lombardia Trophy	157.06	Skate Canada Autumn Classic	145.00	302.06
5	Madeline Aaron / Max Settlage	United States	U.S. International Classic	138.52	Lombardia Trophy	143.85	282.37

=== Ice dance ===
No.	Team	Nation	First event	Score	Second event	Score	Total score
1	Maia Shibutani / Alex Shibutani	United States	Ondrej Nepela Trophy	162.98	Ice Challenge	166.34	329.32
2	Charlène Guignard / Marco Fabbri	Italy	Ondrej Nepela Trophy	143.94	Golden Spin of Zagreb	166.46	310.40
3	Nelli Zhiganshina / Alexander Gazsi	Germany	Nebelhorn Trophy	147.10	Finlandia Trophy	139.98	287.08
4	Alexandra Nazarova / Maksym Nikitin	Ukraine	Warsaw Cup	136.90	Golden Spin of Zagreb	148.48	285.38
5	Federica Testa / Lukáš Csölley	Slovakia	Volvo Open Cup	140.84	Warsaw Cup	143.36	284.20

== Top scores ==
=== Men's singles ===
Top 10 best scores in the men's combined total
No.	Skater	Nation	Score	Event
1	Denis Ten	Kazakhstan	249.94	2014 Golden Spin of Zagreb
2	Max Aaron	United States	240.22	2014 U.S. International Classic
3	Michal Březina	Czech Republic	239.62	2014 Golden Spin of Zagreb
4	Richard Dornbush	United States	237.28	2014 Lombardia Trophy
5	Jason Brown	United States	237.17	2014 Nebelhorn Trophy
6	Takahito Mura	Japan	235.79	2014 Lombardia Trophy
7	Alexander Petrov	Russia	231.53	2014 Warsaw Cup
8	Konstantin Menshov	Russia	229.51	2014 Golden Spin of Zagreb
9	Ross Miner	United States	227.26	2014 Skate Canada Autumn Classic
10	Nam Nguyen	Canada	225.63	2014 Skate Canada Autumn Classic

=== Ladies' singles ===
Top 10 best scores in the ladies' combined total
No.	Skater	Nation	Score	Event
1	Elizaveta Tuktamysheva	Russia	196.66	2014 Warsaw Cup
2	Alena Leonova	Russia	186.71	2014 Nebelhorn Trophy
3	Satoko Miyahara	Japan	183.90	2014 Lombardia Trophy
4	Gracie Gold	United States	182.31	2014 Nebelhorn Trophy
5	Polina Edmunds	United States	176.35	2014 U.S. International Classic
6	Courtney Hicks	United States	174.14	2014 U.S. International Classic
7	Hannah Miller	United States	170.26	2014 Lombardia Trophy
8	Kiira Korpi	Finland	167.81	2014 Golden Spin of Zagreb
9	Maria Artemieva	Russia	166.48	2014 Golden Spin of Zagreb
10	Gabrielle Daleman	Canada	165.59	2014 Skate Canada Autumn Classic

=== Pairs ===
Top 10 best scores in the pairs' combined total
No.	Team	Nation	Score	Event
1	Meagan Duhamel / Eric Radford	Canada	203.16	2014 Skate Canada Autumn Classic
2	Yuko Kavaguti / Alexander Smirnov	Russia	195.89	2014 Nebelhorn Trophy
3	Kristina Astakhova / Alexei Rogonov	Russia	184.24	2014 Golden Spin of Zagreb
4	Evgenia Tarasova / Vladimir Morozov	Russia	178.98	2014 Nebelhorn Trophy
5	Haven Denney / Brandon Frazier	United States	167.28	2014 Skate Canada Autumn Classic
6	Valentina Marchei / Ondrej Hotarek	Italy	167.18	2014 Golden Spin of Zagreb
7	Alexa Scimeca / Chris Knierim	United States	166.10	2014 Nebelhorn Trophy
8	Vanessa James / Morgan Cipres	France	164.15	2014 Nebelhorn Trophy
9	Tarah Kayne / Daniel O'Shea	United States	161.72	2014 Golden Spin of Zagreb
10	Lina Fedorova / Maxim Miroshkin	Russia	157.80	2014 Ice Challenge

=== Ice dance ===
Top 10 best scores in the combined total (ice dance)
No.	Team	Nation	Score	Event
1	Madison Hubbell / Zachary Donohue	United States	166.74	2014 Golden Spin of Zagreb
2	Charlene Guignard / Marco Fabbri	Italy	166.46	2014 Golden Spin of Zagreb
3	Maia Shibutani / Alex Shibutani	United States	166.34	2014 Ice Challenge
4	Kaitlyn Weaver / Andrew Poje	Canada	165.32	2014 Nebelhorn Trophy
5	Madison Chock / Evan Bates	United States	163.73	2014 Nebelhorn Trophy
6	Alexandra Stepanova / Ivan Bukin	Russia	152.82	2015 Finlandia Trophy
7	Gabriella Papadakis / Guillaume Cizeron	France	150.20	2014 Skate Canada Autumn Classic
8	Sara Hurtado / Adria Diaz	Spain	150.00	2014 Golden Spin of Zagreb
9	Alexandra Nazarova / Maxim Nikitin	Ukraine	148.48	2014 Golden Spin of Zagreb
10	Nelli Zhiganshina / Alexander Gazsi	Germany	147.10	2014 Nebelhorn Trophy
