= 2014 Skate America =

- Type: Grand Prix
- Date: October 24 – 26
- Season: 2014–15
- Location: Hoffman Estates, Illinois
- Host: U.S. Figure Skating
- Venue: Sears Centre

Champions
- Men's singles: (Japan) Tatsuki Machida
- Ladies' singles: (Russia) Elena Radionova
- Pairs: (Russia) Yuko Kavaguti / Alexander Smirnov
- Ice dance: (United States) Madison Chock / Evan Bates
- Previous: 2013 Skate America
- Next: 2015 Skate America
- Next Grand Prix: 2014 Skate Canada International

The 2014 Hilton HHonors Skate America was the first event of six in the 2014–15 ISU Grand Prix of Figure Skating, a senior-level international invitational competition series. It was held at the Sears Centre in Hoffman Estates, Illinois on October 24–26. Medals were awarded in the disciplines of men's singles, ladies' singles, pair skating, and ice dancing. Skaters earned points toward qualifying for the 2014–15 Grand Prix Final.

== Entries ==
| Country | Men | Ladies | Pairs | Ice dancing |
|---|---|---|---|---|
| Australia | | Brooklee Han | | |
| Austria | | | Miriam Ziegler / Severin Kiefer | |
| Belgium | Jorik Hendrickx | | | |
| Canada | Nam Nguyen | | Vanessa Grenier / Maxime Deschamps | Nicole Orford / Thomas Williams; Élisabeth Paradis / François-Xavier Ouellette |
| China | | | Peng Cheng / Zhang Hao | |
| France | Chafik Besseghier | Maé-Bérénice Méité | | |
| Georgia | | Elene Gedevanishvili | | |
| Germany | | | Annabelle Prölß / Ruben Blommaert | |
| Israel | Alexei Bychenko | | | |
| Italy | | | | Charlène Guignard / Marco Fabbri |
| Japan | Tatsuki Machida | Haruka Imai | | |
| Kazakhstan | Denis Ten | | | |
| South Korea | | Park So-youn | | |
| Philippines | Michael Christian Martinez | | | |
| Russia | Artur Gachinski; Adian Pitkeev | Elena Radionova; Elizaveta Tuktamysheva | Yuko Kavaguti / Alexander Smirnov | Alexandra Stepanova / Ivan Bukin |
| Slovakia | | | | Federica Testa / Lukáš Csölley |
| Ukraine | | Natalia Popova | | |
| United States | Jason Brown; Jeremy Abbott; Douglas Razzano | Samantha Cesario; Gracie Gold; Mirai Nagasu | Madeline Aaron / Max Settlage; Haven Denney / Brandon Frazier; Alexa Scimeca / Chris Knierim | Anastasia Cannuscio / Colin McManus; Madison Chock / Evan Bates; Maia Shibutani / Alex Shibutani |

=== Changes to initial line-up ===
- On July 2, it was announced that Stefania Berton / Ondřej Hotárek had split up. On July 21, it was announced that their replacement was Elizaveta Usmanteseva / Roman Talan.
- On July 10, Douglas Razzano and Anastasia Cannuscio / Colin McManus were added as host picks.
- On July 18, Samantha Cesario was added as a host pick.
- On August 13, Maylin Wende / Daniel Wende were removed from the roster due to an injury to Daniel. On August 22, it was announced that Annabelle Prölß / Ruben Blommaert would be their replacements.
- On September 2, Madeline Aaron / Max Settlage were announced as host picks.
- On September 19, Elizaveta Usmantseva / Roman Talan were removed from the roster. No reason has been given. On September 23, it was announced that Miriam Ziegler / Severin Kiefer were their replacements.
- On September 20, it was reported that Ekaterina Bobrova / Dmitri Soloviev were going to be withdrawing due to an injury to Soloviev. They were removed from the roster on September 29. On October 1, Alexandra Stepanova / Ivan Bukin were announced as their replacements.
- On September 22, it was reported that Tatiana Volosozhar / Maxim Trankov were going to be withdrawing due to an injury to Trankov. On October 1, they were removed from the roster. On October 3, Vanessa Grenier / Maxime Deschamps were announced as their replacements.
- On October 2, Julia Zlobina / Alexei Sitnikov withdrew. No reason was given. On October 3, Federica Testa / Lukas Csolley were announced as their replacements.
- On October 10, Cathy Reed / Chris Reed were replaced by Élisabeth Paradis / François-Xavier Ouellette. No reason has been given.
- On October 17, Joshi Helgesson was removed from the roster due to an injury. She was not replaced.

== Results ==
=== Men ===
| Rank | Name | Nation | Total points | SP | | FS | |
|---|---|---|---|---|---|---|---|
| 1 | Tatsuki Machida | Japan | 269.09 | 1 | 93.39 | 1 | 175.70 |
| 2 | Jason Brown | United States | 234.17 | 3 | 79.75 | 3 | 154.42 |
| 3 | Nam Nguyen | Canada | 232.24 | 7 | 73.71 | 2 | 158.53 |
| 4 | Denis Ten | Kazakhstan | 224.74 | 4 | 77.18 | 4 | 147.56 |
| 5 | Jeremy Abbott | United States | 219.33 | 2 | 81.82 | 6 | 137.51 |
| 6 | Adian Pitkeev | Russia | 212.07 | 5 | 76.13 | 7 | 135.94 |
| 7 | Chafik Besseghier | France | 208.70 | 8 | 73.57 | 8 | 135.13 |
| 8 | Douglas Razzano | United States | 204.48 | 10 | 66.23 | 5 | 138.25 |
| 9 | Artur Gachinski | Russia | 200.13 | 6 | 75.71 | 10 | 124.42 |
| 10 | Michael Christian Martinez | Philippines | 197.58 | 9 | 72.81 | 9 | 124.77 |
| 11 | Alexei Bychenko | Israel | 185.98 | 11 | 64.54 | 12 | 121.44 |
| 12 | Jorik Hendrickx | Belgium | 177.43 | 12 | 55.99 | 11 | 121.44 |

=== Ladies ===
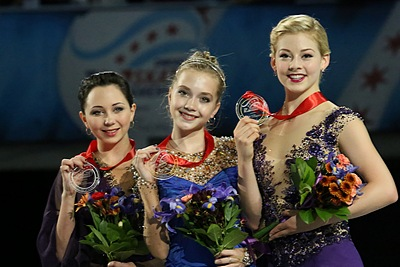
From left to right: Elizaveta Tuktamysheva (2nd), Elena Radionova (1st), and Gracie Gold (3rd).

| Rank | Name | Nation | Total points | SP | | FS | |
|---|---|---|---|---|---|---|---|
| 1 | Elena Radionova | Russia | 195.47 | 2 | 65.57 | 1 | 129.90 |
| 2 | Elizaveta Tuktamysheva | Russia | 189.62 | 1 | 67.41 | 2 | 122.21 |
| 3 | Gracie Gold | United States | 179.38 | 3 | 60.81 | 3 | 118.57 |
| 4 | Samantha Cesario | United States | 174.58 | 4 | 58.96 | 4 | 115.62 |
| 5 | Park So-youn | South Korea | 170.43 | 5 | 55.74 | 5 | 114.69 |
| 6 | Mirai Nagasu | United States | 158.21 | 10 | 49.29 | 6 | 108.92 |
| 7 | Elene Gedevanishvili | Georgia | 158.10 | 6 | 55.39 | 9 | 102.71 |
| 8 | Haruka Imai | Japan | 157.97 | 8 | 53.79 | 7 | 104.18 |
| 9 | Maé-Bérénice Méité | France | 152.71 | 7 | 53.98 | 10 | 98.73 |
| 10 | Brooklee Han | Australia | 150.37 | 11 | 47.38 | 8 | 102.99 |
| 11 | Natalia Popova | Ukraine | 148.15 | 9 | 50.70 | 11 | 97.45 |

=== Pairs ===
| Rank | Name | Nation | Total points | SP | | FS | |
|---|---|---|---|---|---|---|---|
| 1 | Yuko Kavaguti / Alexander Smirnov | Russia | 209.16 | 1 | 69.16 | 1 | 140.00 |
| 2 | Haven Denney / Brandon Frazier | United States | 183.84 | 3 | 61.08 | 2 | 122.76 |
| 3 | Peng Cheng / Zhang Hao | China | 182.43 | 2 | 62.38 | 3 | 120.05 |
| 4 | Alexa Scimeca / Chris Knierim | United States | 168.62 | 4 | 60.61 | 4 | 108.01 |
| 5 | Madeline Aaron / Max Settlage | United States | 160.04 | 5 | 58.41 | 5 | 101.63 |
| 6 | Vanessa Grenier / Maxime Deschamps | Canada | 143.59 | 6 | 51.13 | 6 | 92.46 |
| 7 | Annabelle Prölß / Ruben Blommaert | Germany | 136.35 | 7 | 48.87 | 8 | 87.48 |
| 8 | Miriam Ziegler / Severin Kiefer | Austria | 135.83 | 8 | 45.27 | 7 | 90.56 |

=== Ice dancing ===
| Rank | Name | Nation | Total points | SD | | FD | |
|---|---|---|---|---|---|---|---|
| 1 | Madison Chock / Evan Bates | United States | 171.03 | 1 | 68.96 | 1 | 102.07 |
| 2 | Maia Shibutani / Alex Shibutani | United States | 160.33 | 2 | 64.14 | 2 | 96.19 |
| 3 | Alexandra Stepanova / Ivan Bukin | Russia | 143.87 | 3 | 56.37 | 3 | 87.50 |
| 4 | Élisabeth Paradis / François-Xavier Ouellette | Canada | 137.30 | 8 | 52.11 | 4 | 85.19 |
| 5 | Anastasia Cannuscio / Colin McManus | United States | 135.61 | 5 | 55.14 | 6 | 80.47 |
| 6 | Charlène Guignard / Marco Fabbri | Italy | 135.50 | 7 | 54.18 | 5 | 81.32 |
| 7 | Federica Testa / Lukáš Csölley | Slovakia | 131.72 | 4 | 55.63 | 7 | 76.09 |
| 8 | Nicole Orford / Thomas Williams | Canada | 128.88 | 6 | 55.10 | 8 | 73.78 |
