= Michal Češka =

Czech ice dancer

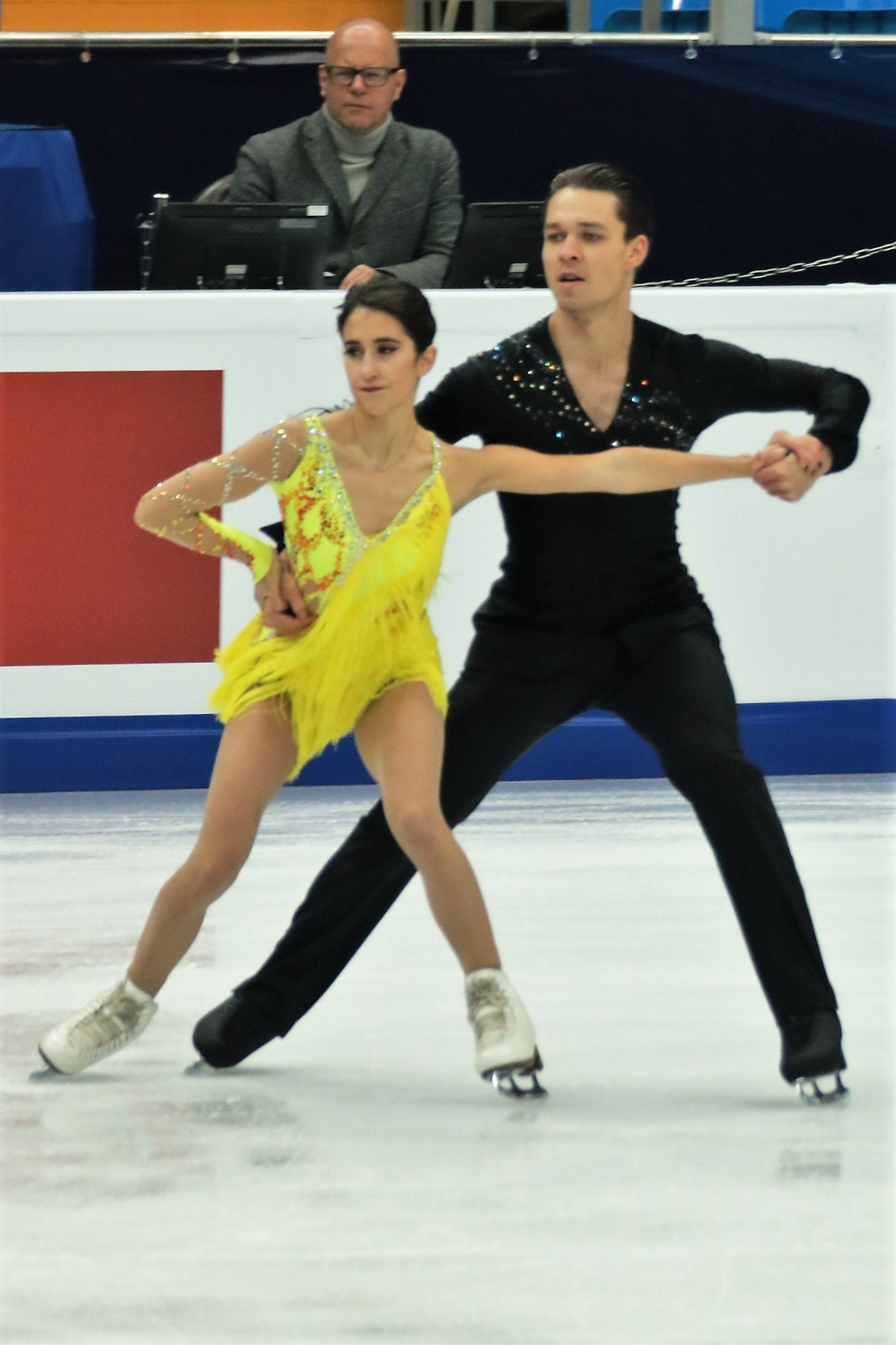
- Mansour and Češka at the 2018 European Championships

Personal information
- Born: 2 September 1992 (age 34) Děčín, Czechoslovakia
- Height: 1.78 m (5 ft 10 in)

Figure skating career
- Country: Czech Republic
- Discipline: Ice dance
- Partner: Cortney Mansour
- Coach: Igor Shpilband
- Skating club: SK Kraso Děčín
- Began skating: 1996

Medal record
Czech Championships
Gold medal – first place	2015 Budapest	Ice dance
Gold medal – first place	2017 Katowice	Ice dance
Gold medal – first place	2018 Košice	Ice dance
Bronze medal – third place	2012 Ostrava	Ice dance

Michal Češka (born 2 September 1992) is a Czech ice dancer. With partner Cortney Mansour, he has won three international medals and reached the free skate at three ISU Championships.

== Personal life ==
Michal Češka was born on 2 September 1992 in Děčín. His father is a former figure skater. His older brother played ice hockey in the highest junior hockey league in Czech Republic.He also has a younger sister who also spent many years on the ice as a figure skater. Michal is recently racing in the Rally Championship in Czech Republic.

== Early career ==
Češka began skating at age four and switched from singles to ice dancing when he was about fifteen. He began competing with Karolína Procházková in 2007. In 2010, they were selected for their first World Junior Championships and finished 26th at the event in The Hague, Netherlands.

Procházková/Češka's luggage containing their skates did not arrive in time at the 2011 Junior Worlds in Gangneung, South Korea, forcing them to withdraw. They placed 21st at the 2012 World Junior Championships in Minsk, Belarus and 23rd at the 2013 World Junior Championships in Milan, Italy. They were coached by Rostislav Sinicyn and Natalia Karamysheva in Prague.

== Partnership with Mansour ==
=== 2013–14 season ===
In mid-2013, Češka teamed up with Canada's Cortney Mansour to compete for the Czech Republic, following a tryout in Europe. They were coached by Carol Lane, John Lane, and Juris Razgulajevs in Toronto, Ontario, Canada. Making their international debut, Mansour/Češka placed 12th at a Junior Grand Prix (JGP) event in Gdańsk in September 2013 and tenth the following month at JGP Ostrava in the Czech Republic. The duo finished 13th at the 2014 World Junior Championships in Sofia, Bulgaria, after placing 14th in both segments.

=== 2014–15 season: Senior debut ===
Mansour/Češka advanced to the senior level in the 2014–15 season. Competing in the Challenger Series, they placed ninth at the 2014 CS Nebelhorn Trophy and tenth at the 2014 CS Skate Canada Autumn Classic. Ranked 19th in the short dance and 15th in the free, they finished 17th at the 2015 European Championships in Stockholm, Sweden.

=== 2015–16 season ===
Mansour/Češka placed sixth at two Challenger Series events in the first half of October, the 2015 CS Ondrej Nepela Trophy and 2015 CS Finlandia Trophy. Deciding to change coaches, they joined Igor Shpilband in Novi, Michigan at the end of the month. The duo won gold at the Pavel Roman Memorial and then finished 13th at the 2016 European Championships in Bratislava after placing 14th in the short and 13th in the free. Ranked 24th in the short, they did not qualify for the free dance at the 2016 World Championships.

=== 2016–17 season: Grand Prix debut ===
In July 2016, Mansour/Češka received their first Grand Prix assignment, replacing Federica Testa / Lukas Csolley at the 2016 Trophée de France.

== Programs ==
=== With Mansour ===
Season	Short dance	Free dance
2017–2018	Samba: Beat On My Drum by Gabry Ponte; Rhumba: Loin by Gims; Samba: Adios by Zimpala	The Godfather Part II by Nino Rota, Carmine Coppola; Kay; A New Carpet; Main Title/The Immigrant; The Godfather by Nino Rota; Godfather Waltz; Finale
2016–2017	Blues: Summertime by Renee Olsted; Swing: Diga Diga Do by Big Bad Voodoo Daddy	The Godfather Part II by Nino Rota, Carmine Coppola; Kay; A New Carpet; Main Title/The Immigrant; The Godfather by Nino Rota; Godfather Waltz; Finale
2015–2016	Waltz: La Valse d'Amelie by Yann Tiersen; Foxtrot: La Vie en rose performed by Louis Armstrong	Broken Ballerina by Amy May; Old Toys (from Iris) by Cirque du Soleil; Pumpkin Pursuit (from Cinderella) by Patrick Doyle
2014–2015	Flamenco: Babylon Flamenco; Paso Doble: La Gracia de Dios	Chess by Benny Andersson, Björn Ulvaeus; End Game; Chess Game
2013–2014	Foxtrot: Kiss Me by Brenda Boykin; Quickstep: It Don't Mean A Thing performed by Club des Belugas	The Great Gatsby; Where the Wind Blows by Coco O.; Young and Beautiful by Lana Del Rey; Bang Bang by will.i.am and Shelby Spalione

=== With Procházková ===
Season	Short dance	Free dance
2012–2013	Blues by Michael Bublé; Swing by Parov Stelar	Latin selection by Marc Anthony
2011–2012	Cha Cha; Samba	Chicago by John Kander, Fred Ebb
2010–2011	Waltz: Happy Day; Quickstep: I Won't Dance	Chicago by John Kander, Fred Ebb
	Original dance	
2009–2010	Czech polka: Beer Barrel Polka (Czech: Škoda lásky) by Jaromír Vejvoda	Spanish medley

== Results ==
GP: Grand Prix; CS: Challenger Series; JGP: Junior Grand Prix

=== With Mansour ===
International
Event	13–14	14–15	15–16	16–17	17–18	18-19
World Champ.			24th		26th	
European Champ.		17th	13th		25th	
GP GP Finland						TBD
GP Trophée de France				8th		
CS Autumn Classic		10th				
CS Finlandia Trophy			6th			
CS Golden Spin				7th		
CS Nebelhorn Trophy		9th			5th	
CS Nepela Memorial			6th	6th	8th	
CS U.S. Classic				10th		
Autumn Classic			5th			
Bavarian Open		3rd				
Open d'Andorra				3rd		
Pavel Roman Memorial		2nd	1st			
Santa Claus Cup			4th			
Volvo Open					4th	
International: Junior
World Junior Champ.	13th					
JGP Czech Republic	10th					
JGP Poland	12th					
Pavel Roman Memorial	2nd J					
National
Czech Champ.	1st J	1st		1st		
J = Junior level TBD = Assigned; WD = Withdrew

=== With Procházková ===
International
Event	07–08	08–09	09–10	10–11	11–12	12–13
Golden Spin					7th	
International: Junior
Junior Worlds			26th	WD	21st	23rd
JGP Austria					8th	7th
JGP Croatia			10th			
JGP Czech Rep.		10th		6th		
JGP Germany				9th		
JGP Italy		8th				
JGP Latvia					4th	
JGP Poland			9th			
JGP Turkey						7th
Bavarian Open				3rd J	1st J	
Ice Challenge				1st J		
NRW Trophy	10th J		10th J			
Pavel Roman	10th J		4th J	2nd J		1st J
Tirnavia			3rd J			
National
Czech Champ.	3rd J	1st J		1st J	3rd	1st J
J = Junior level; WD = Withdrew
