= Cortney Mansour =

Canadian-Czech ice dancer

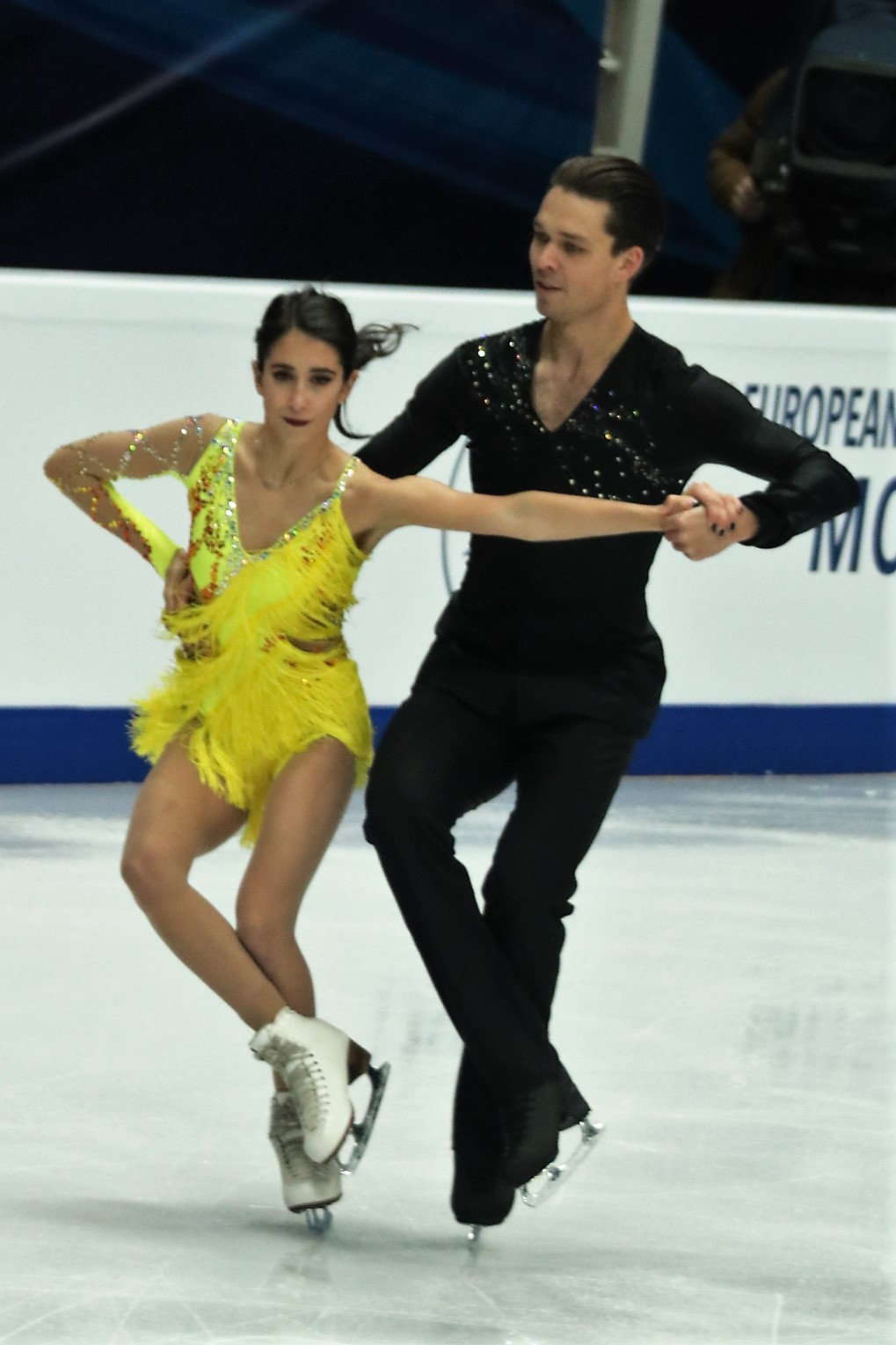
- Mansour competes with Češka in 2018

Personal information
- Other names: Cortney Mansourová
- Born: December 15, 1994 (age 31) Regina, Saskatchewan
- Height: 1.55 m (5 ft 1 in)

Figure skating career
- Country: Czech Republic
- Discipline: Ice dance
- Partner: Michal Češka
- Coach: Igor Shpilband
- Skating club: SK Kraso Děčín
- Began skating: 1996

Medal record
Representing Czech Republic
Czech Championships
Gold medal – first place	2015 Budapest	Ice dance
Gold medal – first place	2017 Katowice	Ice dance
Gold medal – first place	2018 Košice	Ice dance

Cortney Mansour or Mansourová (born December 15, 1994) is a Canadian-Czech ice dancer. With Michal Češka, she has won four international medals and three national titles. The two have reached the final segment at three ISU Championships.

Earlier in her career, she competed with Daryn Zhunussov for Kazakhstan.

== Personal life ==
Cortney Mansour was born on December 15, 1994, in Regina, Saskatchewan, Canada. She became a Czech citizen in December 2017. Her aunt skated for the Ice Capades.

== Early career ==
Mansour started learning to skate in 1996.

In the 2011–12 season, she competed with Daryn Zhunussov for Kazakhstan. After starting the season in the junior ranks, Mansour/Zhunussov decided to move up to the senior level. In January, they placed last at the 2012 Four Continents Championships in Colorado Springs, Colorado. In March, they competed at the 2012 World Championships in Nice, France; their placement in the preliminary round, 20th, was insufficient to qualify for the short dance.

== Partnership with Češka ==
=== 2013–14 season ===
In 2013, Mansour teamed up with Michal Češka to compete for the Czech Republic, following a tryout in Europe. They were coached by Carol Lane, Jon Lane, and Juris Razgulajevs in Toronto, Ontario, Canada. Making their international debut, Mansour/Češka placed 12th at a Junior Grand Prix (JGP) event in Gdańsk in September 2013 and tenth the following month at JGP Ostrava in the Czech Republic. The duo finished 13th at the 2014 World Junior Championships in Sofia, Bulgaria, after placing 14th in both segments.

=== 2014–15 season: Senior debut ===
Mansour/Češka advanced to the senior level in the 2014–15 season. Competing in the Challenger Series, they placed ninth at the 2014 CS Nebelhorn Trophy and tenth at the 2014 CS Skate Canada Autumn Classic. Ranked 19th in the short dance and 15th in the free, they finished 17th at the 2015 European Championships in Stockholm, Sweden.

=== 2015–16 season ===
Mansour/Češka placed sixth at two Challenger Series events in the first half of October, the 2015 CS Ondrej Nepela Trophy and 2015 CS Finlandia Trophy. Deciding to change coaches, they joined Igor Shpilband in Novi, Michigan, at the end of the month. The duo won gold at the Pavel Roman Memorial and then finished 13th at the 2016 European Championships in Bratislava after placing 14th in the short and 13th in the free. Ranked 24th in the short, they did not qualify for the free dance at the 2016 World Championships.

=== 2016–17 season: Grand Prix debut ===
In July 2016, Mansour/Češka received their first Grand Prix assignment, replacing Federica Testa / Lukas Csolley at the 2016 Trophée de France.

== Programs ==
=== With Češka ===
Season	Short dance	Free dance
2017–2018	Samba: Beat On My Drum by Gabry Ponte; Rhumba: Loin by Gims; Samba: Adios by Zimpala	The Godfather Part II by Nino Rota, Carmine Coppola; Kay; A New Carpet; Main Title/The Immigrant; The Godfather by Nino Rota; Godfather Waltz; Finale
2016–2017	Blues: Summertime by Renee Olsted; Swing: Diga Diga Do by Big Bad Voodoo Daddy	The Godfather Part II by Nino Rota, Carmine Coppola; Kay; A New Carpet; Main Title/The Immigrant; The Godfather by Nino Rota; Godfather Waltz; Finale
2015–2016	Waltz: La Valse d'Amelie by Yann Tiersen; Foxtrot: La Vie en rose performed by Louis Armstrong	Broken Ballerina by Amy May; Old Toys (from Iris) by Cirque du Soleil; Pumpkin Pursuit (from Cinderella) by Patrick Doyle
2014–2015	Flamenco: Babylon Flamenco; Paso Doble: La Gracia de Dios	Chess by Benny Andersson, Björn Ulvaeus; End Game; Chess Game
2013–2014	Foxtrot: Kiss Me by Brenda Boykin; Quickstep: It Don't Mean A Thing performed by Club des Belugas	The Great Gatsby; Where the Wind Blows by Coco O.; Young and Beautiful by Lana Del Rey; Bang Bang by will.i.am and Shelby Spalione

=== With Zhunussov ===
Season	Short dance	Free dance
2011–2012	Perhaps, Perhaps, Perhaps performed by The Pussycat Dolls; Bla Bla Bla Cha Cha Cha by Petty Booka	Cirque du Soleil; Carrousel (from Quidam); Imposteur (from Koozå)

== Results ==
GP: Grand Prix; CS: Challenger Series; JGP: Junior Grand Prix

=== With Češka for the Czech Republic ===
International
Event	13–14	14–15	15–16	16–17	17–18	18-19
World Champ.			24th		26th	
European Champ.		17th	13th		25th	
GP GP Finland						WD
GP Trophée de France				8th		
CS Autumn Classic		10th				
CS Finlandia Trophy			6th			
CS Golden Spin				7th		
CS Nebelhorn Trophy		9th			5th	
CS Nepela Memorial			6th	6th	8th	
CS U.S. Classic				10th		
Autumn Classic			5th			
Bavarian Open		3rd				
Open d'Andorra				3rd		
Pavel Roman Memorial		2nd	1st			
Santa Claus Cup			4th			
Volvo Open					4th	
International: Junior
World Junior Champ.	13th					
JGP Czech Republic	10th					
JGP Poland	12th					
Pavel Roman Memorial	2nd J					
National
Czech Champ.	1st J	1st		1st		
J = Junior level TBD = Assigned; WD = Withdrew

=== With Zhunussov for Kazakhstan ===
International
Event	2011–12
World Champ.	35th
Four Continents Champ.	11th
Istanbul Cup	9th
International: Junior
JGP Estonia	15th
JGP Italy	14th
NRW Trophy	24th J
National
Kazakhstani Champ.	2nd
J = Junior level
