= 2014 CS Nebelhorn Trophy =

2014 Nebelhorn Trophy
- Type: ISU Challenger Series
- Date: September 24 – 27
- Season: 2014–15
- Location: Oberstdorf, Germany
- Venue: Eislaufzentrum Oberstdorf

Champions
- Men's singles: (United States) Jason Brown
- Ladies' singles: (Russia) Elizaveta Tuktamysheva
- Pairs: (Russia) Yuko Kavaguti / Alexander Smirnov
- Ice dance: (Canada) Kaitlyn Weaver / Andrew Poje
- Previous: 2013 Nebelhorn Trophy
- Next: 2015 CS Nebelhorn Trophy

The 2014 Nebelhorn Trophy was a senior international figure skating competition in the 2014–15 season. Part of the 2014–15 ISU Challenger Series, it was held on 24–27 September 2014 at the Eislaufzentrum Oberstdorf in Oberstdorf, Germany. Medals were awarded in men's and ladies' singles, pair skating, and ice dance.

== Entries ==
Country	Men	Ladies	Pairs	Ice dance
Australia	Andrew Dodds	Brooklee Han	Paris Stephens / Matthew Dodds	
Belarus		Janina Makeenka	Maria Paliakova / Nikita Bochkov	
Canada	Elladj Baldé; Liam Firus	Veronik Mallet	Vanessa Grenier / Maxime Deschamps	Élisabeth Paradis / François-Xavier Ouellette; Kaitlyn Weaver / Andrew Poje
Czech Republic	Michal Březina	Jana Coufalová		Cortney Mansour / Michal Češka
Estonia		Helery Hälvin		
Finland		Nelma Hede; Rosaliina Kuparinen; Emilia Toikkanen; Juulia Turkkila		
France			Vanessa James / Morgan Ciprès	
Germany	Alexander Bjelde; Paul Fentz; Martin Rappe		Annabelle Prölß / Ruben Blommaert	Nelli Zhiganshina / Alexander Gazsi
Israel	Alexei Bychenko; Daniel Samohin	Aimee Buchanan		Allison Reed / Vasili Rogov
Italy	Ivan Righini		Alessandra Cernuschi / Filippo Ambrosini	Lauri Bonacorsi / Francesco Fioretti; Victoria Manni / Benjamin Naggiar
Japan	Ryuju Hino		Narumi Takahashi / Ryuichi Kihara	
Kazakhstan	Denis Ten			
Luxembourg		Fleur Maxwell		
Norway		Camilla Gjersem		
Romania		Julia Sauter		
Russia	Konstantin Menshov; Sergei Voronov	Alena Leonova; Elizaveta Tuktamysheva	Yuko Kavaguti / Alexander Smirnov; Evgenia Tarasova / Vladimir Morozov	
South Korea				Rebeka Kim / Kirill Minov; Yura Min / Timothy Koleto
Sweden		Isabelle Olsson		
Switzerland		Anna Ovcharova		
United Kingdom			Amani Fancy / Christopher Boyadji; Caitlin Yankowskas / Hamish Gaman	Carter Marie Jones / Richard Sharpe
United States	Jason Brown; Alexander Johnson	Mariah Bell; Gracie Gold	Madeline Aaron / Max Settlage; Alexa Scimeca / Chris Knierim	Madison Chock / Evan Bates; Kaitlin Hawayek / Jean-Luc Baker

== Results ==
=== Men ===
Rank	Name	Nation	Total points	SP		FS	
1	Jason Brown	United States	237.17	1	83.59	1	153.58
2	Michal Březina	Czech Republic	228.48	2	78.27	2	150.21
3	Konstantin Menshov	Russia	211.03	5	70.60	3	140.43
4	Sergei Voronov	Russia	210.05	4	71.29	4	138.76
5	Elladj Baldé	Canada	196.78	3	71.73	5	125.05
6	Alexander Johnson	United States	191.41	6	69.20	6	122.21
7	Alexei Bychenko	Israel	178.71	7	66.55	9	112.16
8	Ivan Righini	Italy	177.89	8	62.18	7	115.71
9	Liam Firus	Canada	172.54	9	58.42	8	114.12
10	Ryuju Hino	Japan	155.70	12	26.16	10	106.71
11	Daniel Samohin	Israel	144.53	11	49.67	11	94.86
12	Paul Fentz	Germany	141.80	10	51.77	12	90.03
13	Alexander Bjelde	Germany	134.29	14	44.66	13	89.63
14	Andrew Dodds	Australia	122.65	13	44.80	14	77.85
WD	Denis Ten	Kazakhstan					

=== Ladies ===
Rank	Name	Nation	Total points	SP		FS	
1	Elizaveta Tuktamysheva	Russia	192.65	2	64.94	1	127.71
2	Alena Leonova	Russia	186.71	1	66.72	3	119.99
3	Gracie Gold	United States	182.31	3	61.82	2	120.49
4	Brooklee Han	Australia	149.69	5	52.41	5	97.28
5	Mariah Bell	United States	148.48	6	50.72	4	97.76
6	Juulia Turkkila	Finland	137.35	4	52.57	7	84.78
7	Veronik Mallet	Canada	132.10	7	50.08	9	82.02
8	Fleur Maxwell	Luxembourg	131.22	9	44.81	6	86.41
9	Camilla Gjersem	Norway	126.53	10	42.44	8	84.09
10	Anna Ovcharova	Switzerland	122.79	8	46.61	10	76.18
11	Julia Sauter	Romania	111.76	15	38.27	11	73.49
12	Emilia Toikkanen	Finland	106.60	11	40.41	12	66.19
13	Janina Makeenka	Belarus	103.76	13	39.02	13	64.74
14	Helery Hälvin	Estonia	101.42	12	40.32	14	61.10
15	Nelma Hede	Finland	95.33	14	38.73	16	56.60
16	Aimee Buchanan	Israel	95.13	16	34.47	15	60.66

=== Pairs ===
Rank	Name	Nation	Total points	SP		FS	
1	Yuko Kavaguti / Alexander Smirnov	Russia	195.89	1	66.59	1	129.30
2	Evgenia Tarasova / Vladimir Morozov	Russia	178.98	2	65.74	2	113.24
3	Alexa Scimeca / Chris Knierim	United States	166.10	3	55.29	3	110.81
4	Vanessa James / Morgan Ciprès	France	164.15	4	55.18	4	108.97
5	Vanessa Grenier / Maxime Deschamps	Canada	157.06	6	50.67	5	106.39
6	Madeline Aaron / Max Settlage	United States	143.85	5	51.80	6	92.05
7	Narumi Takahashi / Ryuichi Kihara	Japan	134.59	7	46.83	7	87.76
8	Amani Fancy / Christopher Boyadji	United Kingdom	123.04	9	45.50	8	77.54
9	Maria Paliakova / Nikita Bochkov	Belarus	122.12	8	46.37	9	75.75
10	Paris Stephens / Matthew Dodds	Australia	87.24	10	31.09	10	56.15

=== Ice dance ===
Rank	Name	Nation	Total points	SD		FD	
1	Kaitlyn Weaver / Andrew Poje	Canada	165.32	1	65.59	2	99.73
2	Madison Chock / Evan Bates	United States	163.73	2	62.80	1	100.93
3	Nelli Zhiganshina / Alexander Gazsi	Germany	147.10	3	58.67	4	88.43
4	Kaitlin Hawayek / Jean-Luc Baker	United States	142.31	4	53.11	3	89.20
5	Élisabeth Paradis / François-Xavier Ouellette	Canada	128.05	5	47.62	5	80.43
6	Allison Reed / Vasili Rogov	Israel	119.50	6	42.50	6	77.00
7	Rebeka Kim / Kirill Minov	South Korea	107.81	10	38.61	7	69.20
8	Yura Min / Timothy Koleto	South Korea	103.46	8	40.10	8	63.36
9	Cortney Mansour / Michal Češka	Czech Republic	101.09	7	40.15	9	60.94
10	Lauri Bonacorsi / Francesco Fioretti	Italy	99.99	9	39.29	10	60.70
11	Carter Marie Jones / Richard Sharpe	United Kingdom	94.72	11	36.35	11	33.17
