= 2014 CS Warsaw Cup =

2014 Warsaw Cup
- Type: ISU Challenger Series
- Date: 21 – 24 November 2014
- Season: 2014–15
- Location: Warsaw, Poland
- Venue: Torwar

Champions
- Men's singles: (Russia) Alexander Petrov
- Ladies' singles: (Russia) Elizaveta Tuktamysheva
- Pairs: (Canada) Lubov Iliushechkina / Dylan Moscovitch
- Ice dance: (Slovakia) Federica Testa / Lukas Csolley
- Previous: 2013 Warsaw Cup
- Next: 2015 Warsaw Cup

The 2014 Warsaw Cup was a senior international figure skating competition held in November 2014 in Warsaw, Poland. It was part of the 2014–15 ISU Challenger Series. Medals were awarded in the disciplines of men's singles, ladies' singles, pair skating, and ice dancing.

== Results ==
=== Men ===
Rank	Name	Nation	Total	SP		FS	
1	Alexander Petrov	Russia	231.53	1	75.74	1	155.79
2	Michael Christian Martinez	Philippines	213.38	2	73.81	2	139.57
3	Matteo Rizzo	Italy	168.46	4	56.25	3	112.21
4	Paul Fentz	Germany	163.32	3	58.33	7	104.99
5	Evgeni Vlasov	Russia	159.60	6	54.19	6	105.41
6	Patrick Myzyk	Poland	158.26	11	51.37	5	106.89
7	Marcus Björk	Sweden	155.28	8	53.39	9	101.89
8	Panagiotis Polizoakis	Germany	154.44	9	51.50	8	102.94
9	Petr Coufal	Czech Republic	154.10	13	47.17	4	106.93
10	Tomi Pulkkinen	Finland	152.35	7	53.47	10	98.88
11	Kirill Sokolov	Russia	149.13	12	51.29	11	97.84
12	Yaroslav Paniot	Ukraine	146.00	10	51.37	12	94.63
13	Andrei Vorotnikov	Russia	140.78	5	54.23	14	86.55
14	Sondre Oddvoll Boe	Norway	134.38	14	44.53	13	89.85
15	Slavik Hayrapetyan	Armenia	128.18	15	43.05	15	85.13
WD	Wiktor Witkowski	Poland		16	40.01		
WD	Krzysztof Gala	Poland					
WD	Igor Efimchuk	Russia					

=== Ladies ===
Rank	Name	Nation	Total	SP		FS	
1	Elizaveta Tuktamysheva	Russia	196.66	1	67.83	1	128.83
2	Anastasia Galustyan	Armenia	148.63	3	51.04	3	97.59
3	Aleksandra Golovkina	Lithuania	147.35	4	48.62	2	98.73
4	Liubov Efimenko	Finland	142.94	2	53.41	4	89.53
5	Isabelle Olsson	Sweden	132.45	5	47.69	6	84.76
6	Micol Cristini	Italy	128.33	8	43.82	7	84.51
7	Angelina Kuchvalska	Latvia	125.10	13	38.20	5	86.90
8	Laure Nicodet	Switzerland	120.54	7	44.21	9	76.33
9	Nicole Schott	Germany	120.27	6	46.43	13	73.84
10	Viveca Lindfors	Finland	119.96	10	41.04	8	78.92
11	Sarah Hecken	Germany	117.71	9	41.93	10	75.78
12	Dasa Grm	Slovenia	116.22	11	40.64	11	75.58
13	Ioulia Chtchetinina	Switzerland	112.16	14	37.32	12	74.84
14	Inga Janulevičiūtė	Lithuania	108.82	15	35.33	14	73.49
15	Elizaveta Ukolova	Czech Republic	101.73	16	31.76	15	69.97
16	Jana Coufalova	Czech Republic	96.50	12	38.22	16	58.28
17	Nika Ceric	Slovenia	87.53	17	29.59	17	57.94
WD	Victoria Huebler	Austria					

=== Pairs ===
Rank	Name	Nation	Total	SP		FS	
1	Lubov Iliushechkina / Dylan Moscovitch	Canada	163.02	1	55.40	1	107.62
2	Lina Fedorova / Maxim Miroshkin	Russia	158.16	2	53.96	2	104.20
3	Valentina Marchei / Ondrej Hotarek	Italy	154.60	4	52.32	3	102.28
4	Arina Cherniavskaia / Antonio Souza-Kordeyru	Russia	147.18	3	52.96	4	94.22

=== Ice dancing ===
Rank	Name	Nation	Total	SD		FD	
1	Federica Testa / Lukas Csolley	Slovakia	143.36	1	56.98	1	86.38
2	Alexandra Nazarova / Maxim Nikitin	Ukraine	136.90	3	51.06	2	85.84
3	Wang Shiyue / Liu Xinyu	China	133.44	5	49.18	3	84.26
4	Evgenia Kosigina / Nikolai Moroshkin	Russia	131.44	2	53.02	5	78.42
5	Alisa Agafonova / Alper Ucar	Turkey	129.94	4	49.26	4	80.68
6	Natalia Kaliszek / Maksim Spodirev	Poland	122.38	6	48.86	6	73.52
7	Federica Bernardi / Saverio Giacomelli	Italy	118.76	7	47.32	7	71.44
8	Sofia Sforza / Leo Luca Sforza	Italy	115.86	8	46.96	8	68.90
9	Viktoria Kavaliova / Yurii Bieliaiev	Belarus	109.10	9	44.10	9	65.00
10	Beatrice Tomczak / Damian Binkowski	Poland	99.64	10	39.66	11	59.98
11	Anna Postrybailo / Edwin Siwkowski	Poland	95.82	11	35.38	10	60.44
