= 2014 CS Ice Challenge =

Figure skating competition

2014 Ice Challenge
- Type: ISU Challenger Series
- Date: 11 – 16 November 2014
- Season: 2014–15
- Location: Graz, Austria
- Host: Skate Austria
- Venue: Liebenauer Eishalle

Champions
- Men's singles: (United States) Douglas Razzano
- Ladies' singles: (United States) Hannah Miller
- Pairs: (Russia) Lina Fedorova / Maxim Miroshkin
- Ice dance: (United States) Maia Shibutani / Alex Shibutani
- Previous: 2013 Ice Challenge
- Next: 2015 Ice Challenge

The 2014 Ice Challenge was a senior international figure skating competition held in November 2014 at the Liebenauer Eishalle in Graz, Austria. It was part of the 2014–15 ISU Challenger Series. Medals were awarded in the disciplines of men's singles, ladies' singles, pair skating, and ice dancing.

== Results ==
=== Men ===
Rank	Name	Nation	Total	SP		FS	
1	Douglas Razzano	United States	199.92	2	65.49	1	134.43
2	Alexander Samarin	Russia	196.92	1	69.16	2	127.76
3	Martin Rappe	Germany	180.66	3	60.84	4	119.82
4	Petr Coufal	Czech Republic	173.56	9	48.10	3	125.46
5	Phillip Harris	United Kingdom	173.00	4	57.13	5	115.87
6	Pavel Ignatenko	Belarus	162.59	5	56.75	8	105.84
7	Justus Strid	Denmark	157.83	12	46.39	6	111.44
8	Patrick Myzyk	Poland	157.63	10	47.34	7	110.29
9	Mark Webster	Australia	145.94	6	53.41	9	92.53
10	Mario-Rafael Ionian	Austria	133.74	11	47.14	10	86.60
11	Manuel Koll	Austria	121.01	13	45.50	12	75.51
12	Ali Demirboga	Turkey	119.32	17	38.61	11	80.71
13	Andrew Dodds	Australia	118.03	8	51.85	16	66.18
14	Marco Klepoch	Slovakia	112.79	16	39.67	13	73.12
15	Albert Muck	Austria	111.59	14	43.42	15	68.17
16	Jordan Dodds	Australia	111.40	15	41.86	14	69.54
WD	Kristof Forgo	Hungary					

=== Ladies ===
Rank	Name	Nation	Total	SP		FS	
1	Hannah Miller	United States	156.39	4	46.82	1	109.57
2	Isabelle Olsson	Sweden	152.85	3	53.73	3	99.12
3	Ivett Tóth	Hungary	152.18	2	54.41	4	97.77
4	Alena Leonova	Russia	148.29	1	56.75	5	91.54
5	Lutricia Bock	Germany	148.13	9	43.07	2	105.06
6	Nicole Rajicova	Slovakia	133.67	6	43.41	6	90.26
7	Kyueun Kim	South Korea	127.84	8	43.21	7	84.63
8	Sarah Hecken	Germany	120.63	7	43.39	8	77.24
9	Guia Maria Tagliapietra	Italy	110.32	5	46.39	10	63.93
10	Jennifer Parker	Germany	108.69	11	35.03	9	73.66
11	Jana Coufalova	Czech Republic	91.76	13	32.66	12	59.10
12	Sandy Hoffmann	Germany	91.60	14	31.43	11	60.17
13	Anastasia Kononenko	Ukraine	83.39	10	40.06	15	43.33
14	Christina Grill	Austria	78.56	15	24.02	13	54.54
15	Ines Wohlmuth	Austria	75.59	16	22.29	14	53.30
WD	Carol Bressanutti	Italy					
WD	Anita Madsen	Denmark					
WD	Pernille Sorensen	Denmark					
WD	Diana Pervushkina	Russia					

=== Pairs ===
Rank	Name	Nation	Total	SP		FS	
1	Lina Fedorova / Maxim Miroshkin	Russia	157.80	1	55.78	1	102.02
2	Miriam Ziegler / Severin Kiefer	Austria	142.56	4	46.08	2	96.48
3	Mari Vartmann / Aaron Van Cleave	Germany	140.82	2	48.54	3	92.28
4	Arina Cherniavskaia / Antonio Souza-Kordeyru	Russia	133.78	3	46.88	4	86.90
5	Alessandra Cernuschi / Filippo Ambrosini	Italy	123.70	5	42.86	6	80.84
6	Maria Paliakova / Nikita Bochkov	Belarus	120.94	6	39.82	5	81.12
7	Marin Ono / Hon Lam To	Hong Kong	93.64	7	36.44	7	57.20
8	Olga Bestandigova / Ilhan Mansiz	Turkey	58.28	8	24.44	8	33.84

=== Ice dancing ===
Rank	Name	Nation	Total	SD		FD	
1	Maia Shibutani / Alex Shibutani	United States	166.34	1	65.38	1	100.96
2	Laurence Fournier Beaudry / Nikolaj Sorensen	Denmark	147.06	2	59.12	2	87.94
3	Barbora Silna / Juri Kurakin	Austria	129.58	3	50.20	3	79.38
4	Henna Lindholm / Ossi Kanervo	Finland	127.30	5	49.56	4	77.74
5	Misato Komatsubara / Andrea Fabbri	Italy	127.14	4	50.16	6	76.98
6	Alisa Agafonova / Alper Ucar	Turkey	126.28	6	49.04	5	77.24
7	Jennifer Urban / Sevan Lerche	Germany	108.62	7	42.58	7	66.04
8	Nathalie Rehfeldt / Bennet Preiss	Germany	90.92	8	37.78	8	53.14
