= 2014 Trophée Éric Bompard =

- Type: Grand Prix
- Date: November 21 – 23
- Season: 2014–15
- Location: Bordeaux
- Host: Federation Française des Sports de Glace
- Venue: Meriadeck Ice Rink

Champions
- Men's singles: (Russia) Maxim Kovtun
- Ladies' singles: (Russia) Elena Radionova
- Pairs: (Russia) Ksenia Stolbova / Fedor Klimov
- Ice dance: (France) Gabriella Papadakis / Guillaume Cizeron
- Previous: 2013 Trophée Éric Bompard
- Next: 2015 Trophée Éric Bompard
- Previous Grand Prix: 2014 Rostelecom Cup
- Next Grand Prix: 2014 NHK Trophy

The 2014 Trophée Éric Bompard was the fifth event of six in the 2014–15 ISU Grand Prix of Figure Skating, a senior-level international invitational competition series. It was held at the Meriadeck Ice Rink in Bordeaux on November 21–23. Medals were awarded in the disciplines of men's singles, ladies' singles, pair skating, and ice dancing. Skaters earned points toward qualifying for the 2014–15 Grand Prix Final.

== Entries ==
Country	Men	Ladies	Pairs	Ice dancing
Austria			Miriam Ziegler / Severin Kiefer	
Canada		Veronik Mallet	Kirsten Moore-Towers / Michael Marinaro	Piper Gilles / Paul Poirier; Alexandra Paul / Mitchell Islam
China	Yan Han		Sui Wenjing / Han Cong; Wang Xuehan / Wang Lei	
Czech Republic		Eliška Březinová		
France	Florent Amodio; Chafik Besseghier	Laurine Lecavelier; Maé-Bérénice Méité	Vanessa James / Morgan Ciprès	Gabriella Papadakis / Guillaume Cizeron
Italy			Nicole Della Monica / Matteo Guarise	Charlene Guignard / Marco Fabbri
Japan	Tatsuki Machida	Haruka Imai		
Kazakhstan	Denis Ten			
Russia	Maxim Kovtun; Konstantin Menshov; Adian Pitkeev	Maria Artemieva; Yulia Lipnitskaya; Elena Radionova	Ksenia Stolbova / Fedor Klimov	
Spain				Sara Hurtado / Adrià Díaz
Switzerland		Anna Ovcharova		
South Korea				Rebeka Kim / Kirill Minov
United States	Richard Dornbush; Adam Rippon; Douglas Razzano	Samantha Cesario; Courtney Hicks; Ashley Wagner	Alexa Scimeca / Chris Knierim	Madison Hubbell / Zachary Donohue

=== Changes to initial lineup ===
- On August 29, Romain Ponsart and Anais Ventard were chosen as host picks.
- On September 2, Rebeka Kim / Kirill Minov and Miriam Ziegler / Severin Kiefer were added to the roster, in place of host picks.
- On September 16, Kaetlyn Osmond withdrew due to an injury. On September 17, Veronik Mallet was announced as her replacement.
- On September 20, it was reported that Ekaterina Bobrova / Dmitri Soloviev were going to be withdrawing due to an injury to Soloviev. They were officially removed from the roster on October 13. On October 17, Charlene Guignard / Marco Fabbri were announced as their replacements.
- On November 5, Anais Ventard and Romain Ponsart withdrew from the competition. On November 11, Anna Ovcharova and Douglas Razzano were announced as replacements.
- On November 14, it was reported that Anna Cappellini / Luca Lanotte withdrew due to needing to make changes to their program. They were officially removed from the roster on November 17, and were not replaced.
- On November 17, Song Nan was removed from the roster. No reason has been given and he was not replaced.

== Results ==
=== Men ===
Rank	Name	Nation	Total points	SP		FS	
1	Maxim Kovtun	Russia	243.35	6	77.11	1	166.24
2	Tatsuki Machida	Japan	237.74	2	88.70	2	149.04
3	Denis Ten	Kazakhstan	236.28	1	91.78	5	144.50
4	Konstantin Menshov	Russia	233.22	3	87.47	4	145.75
5	Adam Rippon	United States	225.42	7	76.98	3	148.44
6	Adian Pitkeev	Russia	219.38	8	76.21	7	143.17
7	Richard Dornbush	United States	219.27	4	80.24	8	139.03
8	Yan Han	China	216.85	10	73.18	6	143.67
9	Chafik Besseghier	France	211.24	5	78.22	9	133.02
10	Douglas Razzano	United States	194.24	11	64.98	10	129.26
11	Florent Amodio	France	193.00	9	75.07	11	117.93

=== Ladies ===
Rank	Name	Nation	Total points	SP		FS	
1	Elena Radionova	Russia	203.92	1	67.28	1	136.64
2	Yulia Lipnitskaya	Russia	185.18	2	66.79	2	118.39
3	Ashley Wagner	United States	177.74	3	61.35	4	116.39
4	Courtney Hicks	United States	172.58	6	55.70	3	116.88
5	Maé-Bérénice Méité	France	169.46	5	57.61	5	111.85
6	Maria Artemieva	Russia	162.49	4	58.38	7	104.11
7	Samantha Cesario	United States	161.70	7	55.19	6	106.51
8	Haruka Imai	Japan	154.70	8	54.72	8	99.98
9	Eliška Březinová	Czech Republic	144.29	10	48.28	9	96.01
10	Veronik Mallet	Canada	139.64	11	45.07	11	94.57
11	Laurine Lecavelier	France	139.54	12	44.03	10	95.51
12	Anna Ovcharova	Switzerland	133.23	9	50.15	12	83.08

=== Pairs ===
Rank	Name	Nation	Total points	SP		FS	
1	Ksenia Stolbova / Fedor Klimov	Russia	209.81	1	71.20	1	138.61
2	Sui Wenjing / Han Cong	China	200.68	2	67.27	2	133.41
3	Wang Xuehan / Wang Lei	China	181.97	3	63.25	4	118.72
4	Alexa Scimeca / Chris Knierim	United States	179.32	4	59.04	3	120.28
5	Vanessa James / Morgan Ciprès	France	167.88	5	54.20	5	113.68
6	Nicole Della Monica / Matteo Guarise	Italy	161.13	6	53.34	7	107.79
7	Kirsten Moore-Towers / Michael Marinaro	Canada	159.13	7	51.07	6	108.06
8	Miriam Ziegler / Severin Kiefer	Austria	138.92	8	50.01	8	88.91

=== Ice dancing ===
Rank	Name	Nation	Total points	SD		FD	
1	Gabriella Papadakis / Guillaume Cizeron	France	166.66	1	64.06	1	102.60
2	Piper Gilles / Paul Poirier	Canada	157.58	2	61.90	2	95.68
3	Madison Hubbell / Zachary Donohue	United States	152.11	3	60.19	3	91.92
4	Sara Hurtado / Adrià Díaz	Spain	146.10	4	57.64	4	88.46
5	Charlène Guignard / Marco Fabbri	Italy	142.29	5	56.57	5	85.72
6	Alexandra Paul / Mitchell Islam	Canada	138.99	6	55.17	6	83.82
7	Rebeka Kim / Kirill Minov	South Korea	115.95	7	45.66	7	70.29
