= 2014 CS U.S. International Figure Skating Classic =

- Type: ISU Challenger Series
- Date: September 10–14
- Season: 2014–15
- Location: Salt Lake City, Utah, USA
- Venue: Salt Lake City Sports Complex
- Next: 2015 U.S. Classic

The 2014 CS U.S. International Figure Skating Classic was a senior international figure skating competition held in September 2014 at the Salt Lake City Sports Complex in Salt Lake City, Utah. It was part of the 2014–15 ISU Challenger Series. Medals were awarded in the disciplines of men's singles, ladies' singles, pair skating, and ice dancing.

The preliminary entries were published on August 15, 2014.

== Results ==
=== Medal summary ===
Discipline	Gold	Silver	Bronze
Men	(United States) Max Aaron	(United States) Ross Miner	(Japan) Daisuke Murakami
Ladies	(United States) Polina Edmunds	(United States) Courtney Hicks	(Japan) Riona Kato
Pairs	(United States) Alexa Scimeca / Chris Knierim	(United States) Jessica Calalang / Zack Sidhu	(United States) Madeline Aaron / Max Settlage
Ice dancing	(United States) Alexandra Aldridge / Daniel Eaton	(Canada) Nicole Orford / Thomas Williams	(United States) Anastasia Cannuscio / Colin McManus

=== Men ===
Aaron won the men's title for third year in a row.

Rank	Name	Nation	Total	SP		FS	
1	Max Aaron	United States	240.22	1	78.96	1	161.26
2	Ross Miner	United States	209.78	3	67.06	2	142.72
3	Daisuke Murakami	Japan	204.67	2	68.56	3	136.11
4	Douglas Razzano	United States	199.57	5	66.15	4	133.42
5	Ronald Lam	Hong Kong	194.11	4	66.67	5	130.14
6	Andrei Rogozine	Canada	192.16	6	65.29	6	126.87
7	Jordan Moeller	United States	189.81	7	64.21	7	125.60
8	Bela Papp	Finland	163.62	8	54.91	8	108.71
9	Maverick Eguia	Philippines	128.19	9	42.47	9	85.72
10	Balam Labarrios	Mexico	89.91	10	29.38	10	60.53

=== Ladies ===
Polina Edmunds of the United States won her first senior international title. Teammate Courtney Hicks took silver while Japan's Riona Kato obtained the bronze.

Rank	Name	Nation	Total	SP		FS	
1	Polina Edmunds	United States	176.35	1	63.27	2	113.08
2	Courtney Hicks	United States	174.14	3	58.90	1	115.24
3	Riona Kato	Japan	161.69	2	61.55	5	100.14
4	Alaine Chartrand	Canada	161.65	4	58.35	4	103.30
5	Mirai Nagasu	United States	159.49	5	55.46	3	104.03
6	Brooklee Han	Australia	132.64	8	42.74	6	89.90
7	Ashley Shin	United States	125.42	6	49.83	8	75.59
8	Fleur Maxwell	Luxembourg	116.16				
9	Anastasia Kononenko	Ukraine	115.41				
10	Frances Clare Untalan	Philippines	111.35				
11	Beata Papp	Finland	92.70				
12	Chelsea Chiyan Yim	Hong Kong	90.26				
13	Brittany Lau	Singapore	74.85				
WD	Jennifer Parker	Germany					

=== Pairs ===
Scimeca/Knierim won the pairs' title by more than seven points.

Rank	Name	Nation	Total	SP		FS	
1	Alexa Scimeca / Chris Knierim	United States	163.24	2	49.00	1	114.24
2	Jessica Calalang / Zack Sidhu	United States	156.18	1	51.92	2	104.26
3	Madeline Aaron / Max Settlage	United States	138.52	3	48.16	4	90.36
4	Brittany Jones / Joshua Reagan	Canada					
5	Marin Ono / Hon Lam To	Hong Kong					

=== Ice dancing ===
Aldridge/Eaton of the United States won gold ahead of Canada's Orford/Williams and fellow Americans Cannuscio/McManus.

Rank	Name	Nation	Total	SD		FD	
1	Alexandra Aldridge / Daniel Eaton	United States	141.70	1	54.08	1	87.62
2	Nicole Orford / Thomas Williams	Canada	141.02	2	53.74	2	87.28
3	Anastasia Cannuscio / Colin McManus	United States	126.44	4	46.34	3	80.10
4	Marieve Cyr / Benjamin Brisebois Gaudreau	Canada					
5	Pilar Maekawa Moreno / Leonardo Maekawa Moreno	Mexico					
6	Tatiana Kozmava / Aleksandr Zolotarev	Georgia					
WD	Sara Hurtado / Adria Diaz	Spain					
