= 2014 CS Lombardia Trophy =

- Type: ISU Challenger Series
- Date: September 18–21
- Season: 2014–15
- Location: Sesto San Giovanni, Italy
- Venue: PalaSesto

The 2014 CS Lombardia Trophy was a senior international figure skating competition held in September 2014 at the PalaSesto in Sesto San Giovanni, Italy. It was part of the 2014–15 ISU Challenger Series. Medals were awarded in the disciplines of men's singles, ladies' singles, and pair skating.

== Results ==
=== Medal summary ===
Discipline	Gold	Silver	Bronze
Men	(United States) Richard Dornbush	(Japan) Takahito Mura	(Russia) Adian Pitkeev
Ladies	(Japan) Satoko Miyahara	(United States) Hannah Miller	(United States) Angela Wang
Pairs	(United States) Haven Denney / Brandon Frazier	(Italy) Bianca Manacorda / Niccolo Macii	(Russia) Vera Bazarova / Andrei Deputat

=== Men ===
Rank	Name	Nation	Total	SP		FS	
1	Richard Dornbush	United States	237.28	2	79.36	1	157.92
2	Takahito Mura	Japan	235.79	1	81.15	2	154.64
3	Adian Pitkeev	Russia	215.90	5	71.60	3	144.30
4	Grant Hochstein	United States	204.37	3	72.92	6	131.45
5	Moris Kvitelashvili	Russia	201.14	4	72.12	7	129.02
6	Michael Christian Martinez	Philippines	199.92	6	67.36	5	132.56
7	Florent Amodio	France	199.70	7	66.97	4	132.73
8	Phillip Harris	United Kingdom	184.51	8	63.82	8	120.69
9	Brendan Kerry	Australia	166.55	10	54.46	9	112.09
10	Alexander Bjelde	Germany	154.67	9	61.32	11	93.35
11	Marcus Björk	Sweden	142.33	12	48.83	10	93.50
12	Andrew Dodds	Australia	136.05	11	49.65	12	86.40
13	Lewis Gibson	United Kingdom	130.75	13	44.40	13	86.35
WD	Albert Mück	Austria		14	34.91		
WD	Mario-Rafael Ionian	Austria					
WD	Jorik Hendrickx	Belgium					
WD	Michal Březina	Czech Republic					
WD	Tomi Pulkkinen	Finland					
WD	Martin Rappe	Germany					
WD	Maverick Eguia	Philippines					
WD	Jordan Ju	Chinese Taipei					

=== Ladies ===
Rank	Name	Nation	Total	SP		FS	
1	Satoko Miyahara	Japan	183.90	1	58.12	1	125.78
2	Hannah Miller	United States	170.26	7	51.43	2	118.83
3	Angela Wang	United States	160.25	2	54.88	3	105.37
4	Roberta Rodeghiero	Italy	150.94	8	50.41	4	100.53
5	Nathalie Weinzierl	Germany	148.83	5	51.75	5	97.08
6	Joshi Helgesson	Sweden	147.06	3	54.69	6	92.37
7	Laurine Lecavelier	France	139.01	4	52.09	8	86.92
8	Viktoria Helgesson	Sweden	137.73	9	49.49	7	88.24
9	Anais Ventard	France	133.85	6	51.64	11	82.21
10	Byun Ji-hyun	South Korea	129.08	10	44.97	9	84.11
11	Ioulia Chtchetinina	Switzerland	125.96	12	42.02	10	83.94
12	Chea Song-joo	South Korea	120.22	14	40.55	12	79.67
13	Chiara Calderone	Italy	111.91	11	42.76	15	69.15
14	Kerstin Frank	Austria	111.69	16	36.58	13	75.11
15	Inga Janulevičiūtė	Lithuania	107.82	15	37.06	14	70.76
16	Eliška Březinová	Czech Republic	106.69	13	40.57	16	66.12
17	Mila Morelissen	Netherlands	95.56	17	35.35	17	60.21
WD	Matilde Battagin	Italy					
WD	Alisson Krystle Perticheto	Philippines					
WD	Nika Ceric	Slovenia					
WD	Pina Umek	Slovenia					

=== Pairs ===
Rank	Name	Nation	Total	SP		FS	
1	Haven Denney / Brandon Frazier	United States	157.80	2	46.94	1	110.86
2	Bianca Manacorda / Niccolo Macii	Italy	132.80	3	46.50	2	86.30
3	Vera Bazarova / Andrei Deputat	Russia	130.40	1	50.32	3	80.08
4	Paris Stephens / Matthew Dodds	Australia	76.20	4	24.56	4	51.64
WD	Annabelle Prölß / Ruben Blommaert	Germany					
