= Konstantin Menshov =

Russian figure skater

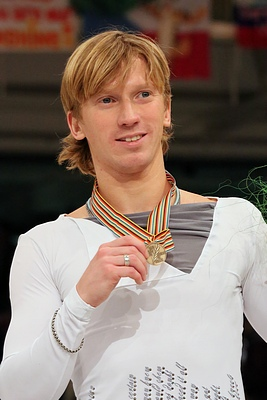
- Menshov in 2014

Personal information
- Native name: Константин Александрович Меньшов
- Full name: Konstantin Alexandrovich Menshov
- Born: 23 February 1983 (age 43) Leningrad, Russian SFSR, Soviet Union
- Height: 1.66 m (5 ft 5 1/2 in)

Figure skating career
- Country: Russia
- Skating club: Olympic School St. Petersburg
- Began skating: 1989
- Retired: June 1, 2016
Medal record
Representing Russia
Figure skating: Men's singles
European Championships
Bronze medal – third place	2014 Budapest	Men's singles
Russian Championships
Gold medal – first place	2011 Saransk	Men's singles
Bronze medal – third place	2013 Sochi	Men's singles

Konstantin Alexandrovich Menshov (Russian: Константин Александрович Меньшов; born 23 February 1983) is a Russian former competitive figure skater. He is the 2014 European bronze medalist, the 2015 Finlandia Trophy champion, a two-time (2010, 2012) Nebelhorn Trophy silver medalist, a two-time (2007, 2012) NRW Trophy champion, and the 2011 Russian national champion. Menshov is one of the skaters to have landed two quad jumps in a short program and three quad jumps in a free program.

== Personal life ==
Konstantin Alexandrovich Menshov was born on 23 February 1983 in Leningrad, Russian SFSR, Soviet Union, along with a fraternal twin brother, Nikita. In 2011, he received his diploma from the Lesgaft University for Physiculture and Sport in Saint Petersburg.

== Career ==
Menshov's first coach was Galina Kashina. He later trained under Evgeni Rukavicin in Saint Petersburg. During summers, he also had training camps in Luleå, Sweden and Jelgava, Latvia.

=== 2010–11 season ===
Menshov won the silver medal at the 2010 Nebelhorn Trophy. At the 2011 Russian Championships, Menshov placed first in both the short and long program, to win the title. He was the only contender to attempt a quadruple toe loop in the long program. He finished 7th in his first trip to the European Championships.

=== 2012–13 season ===
In the 2012–13 season, Menshov won another silver medal at the Nebelhorn Trophy. He placed 4th at both of his Grand Prix events, the 2012 Skate America and 2012 Rostelecom Cup, setting a new personal best overall score at his second event. He won again at the 2012 NRW Trophy with an overall score of 238.63 points, more than 26 points ahead of silver medalist Michal Březina. He won the bronze medal at the 2013 Russian Championships but was not named in the Russian team for the 2013 European Championships. The decision did not contravene regulations which stated that only the top two qualified automatically and the third skater could be determined by the coaches' council. However, an appeal was signed by the president of the Saint Petersburg figure skating federation, Oleg Nilov, and some competitors. Russian Minister of Sport Vitaly Mutko ordered the executive committee of the Russian figure skating federation to review the issue. They voted to uphold their original decision. Menshov was assigned to the 2013 World Team Trophy and placed third in the short program with a personal season's best score (80.60).

In the free skate, he dislocated his right shoulder attempting a triple Axel and withdrew from the event. He had sustained that type of injury only once before, four years prior.

=== 2013–14 season ===
In the 2013–14 season, Menshov finished 8th at the 2013 NHK Trophy and 4th at the 2013 Rostelecom Cup. Making his second European appearance, aged 30, he won the bronze medal at the 2014 European Championships in Budapest.

=== 2014–15 season ===
During the 2014–15 Grand Prix series, he placed fifth at the 2014 Skate Canada International and fourth at the 2014 Trophée Éric Bompard. He finished third in the 2014–15 ISU Challenger Series standings after winning bronze both at the 2014 Nebelhorn Trophy and at the 2014 Golden Spin of Zagreb.

=== 2015–16 season ===
Competing in the 2015–16 ISU Challenger Series, Menshov took bronze at the 2015 Nebelhorn Trophy before winning gold at the 2015 Finlandia Trophy, his first international victory since the 2012 NRW Trophy. He went on to win gold at the Merano Cup.

Menshov sustained a shoulder injury at the 2016 Russian Nationals. On June 1, 2016, he announced his retirement from competitive skating and his transition to a coaching career. In July 2016, he said, "I already had the same kind of injury with my other shoulder and, of course, it's quite problematic to compete with both those injuries. I was able to recover almost all of my jumping elements to the previous level, but the fact is that the performance of choreographic movements causes me pain."

== Skating technique ==
Menshov practiced different quadruple jumps, such as the 4T, 4S, 4Lo, and 4T-3T combination, and also attempted a 4T-4T combination.

In the 2015–16 season, at the age of 32, Menshov attempted three quads in his free skate. He landed 4T-3T combination and 4S in his free skate at the 2015 Nebelhorn Trophy while falling on his 4T attempt in the second half. He landed three quads – 4T-3T, 4S and 4T – in the free program at the 2015 Merano Cup, although he stepped out on the last quad.

== Programs ==
Season	Short program	Free skating	Exhibition
2015–16	Rotting Romance by Marc Terenzi	Mad World by Tears for Fears covered by Adam Lambert; Radioactive by Imagine Dragons covered by Lindsey Stirling and Pentatonix	Radioactive by Imagine Dragons covered by Lindsey Stirling and Pentatonix
2014–15	Rotting Romance by Marc Terenzi	Tango en Silencio by Ara Malikian	
2013–14	Coultergeist by Phil Coulter	Allegro; Rose; Night Run by René Aubry	Thrift Shop (Cover version)
2012–13	Lilies of the Valley (from Pina trailer) by Jun Miyake	Allegro; Rose; Night Run by René Aubry	Shape of my Heart by Sting
2011–12	Dead Silence by Charlie Clouser; Worms lounge; Worms in Black (from Men in Black II) by Danny Elfman	The Race by Yellow; Battle Without Honor or Humanity (from Kill Bill) by Tomoyasu Hotei; Clair de Lune by Claude Debussy	
2010–11	Silver Guitar by Tomas Balazs	Smooth Criminal by David Garrett, Michael Jackson	James Bond music
2009–10	Sway	Saw II by Charlie Clouser	
2008–09	Rise by Safri Duo	Saw II by Charlie Clouser	

== Competitive highlights ==
GP: Grand Prix; CS: Challenger Series

International
Event	02–03	03–04	04–05	05–06	06–07	07–08	08–09	09–10	10–11	11–12	12–13	13–14	14–15	15–16
Europeans									7th			3rd		
GP Bompard													4th	
GP Cup of Russia									10th	8th	4th	4th		
GP NHK Trophy										6th		8th		6th
GP Skate America											4th			5th
GP Skate Canada													5th	
CS Finlandia														1st
CS Golden Spin													3rd	
CS Nebelhorn													3rd	3rd
Universiade			11th		11th		7th							
Cup of Nice			4th		2nd		4th	4th	2nd	3rd		2nd		
Finlandia Trophy						5th	4th	5th	6th					
Merano Cup														1st
Nebelhorn Trophy			13th				11th		2nd	7th	2nd			
NRW Trophy						1st					1st			
National
Russian Champ.	9th	5th	11th	8th	5th	4th	6th	4th	1st	7th	3rd	4th	4th	7th
Team events
World Team; Trophy							5th T 12th P				WD			
