= 2014 CS Autumn Classic International =

2014 Skate Canada Autumn Classic
- Type: ISU Challenger Series
- Date: October 15 – 16
- Season: 2014–15
- Location: Barrie, Ontario, Canada
- Host: Skate Canada
- Venue: Allandale Recreation Centre

Champions
- Men's singles: (United States) Ross Miner
- Ladies' singles: (Canada) Gabrielle Daleman
- Pairs: (Canada) Meagan Duhamel / Eric Radford
- Ice dance: (France) Gabriella Papadakis / Guillaume Cizeron
- Next: 2015 Autumn Classic International

The 2014 Skate Canada Autumn Classic was a senior international figure skating competition in the 2014–15 season. A part of the 2014–15 ISU Challenger Series, the inaugural edition of the annual event was held on 15–16 October 2014 in Barrie, Ontario, Canada. Medals were awarded in men's singles, ladies' singles, pair skating, and ice dance.

== Results ==
=== Men's singles ===
Rank	Name	Nation	Total points	SP		FS	
1	Ross Miner	United States	227.26	1	80.24	2	147.02
2	Nam Nguyen	Canada	225.63	5	66.08	1	159.55
3	Jeremy Ten	Canada	212.64	3	69.22	3	143.42
4	Timothy Dolensky	United States	196.93	8	63.69	4	133.24
5	Ronald Lam	Hong Kong	196.77	2	73.75	9	123.02
6	Kevin Reynolds	Canada	196.60	7	64.56	5	132.04
7	Denis Margalik	Argentina	193.44	9	61.94	6	131.50
8	Alexander Johnson	United States	193.06	4	66.99	8	126.07
9	Andrei Rogozine	Canada	186.90	11	58.73	7	128.17
10	Christopher Berneck	Germany	175.86	10	60.52	10	115.34
11	Brendan Kerry	Australia	168.72	6	64.82	11	103.90
12	Patrick Myzyk	Poland	147.53	13	51.46	12	96.07
13	Bela Papp	Finland	140.17	12	51.52	13	88.65

=== Ladies' singles ===
Rank	Name	Nation	Total points	SP		FS	
1	Gabrielle Daleman	Canada	165.59	1	59.38	2	106.21
2	Angela Wang	United States	163.68	2	56.38	1	107.30
3	Julianne Séguin	Canada	158.99	3	54.18	3	104.81
4	Anastasia Kononenko	Ukraine	126.02	6	44.30	4	81.72
5	Barbie Long	United States	120.28	4	46.48	6	73.80
6	Beata Papp	Finland	111.49	10	36.48	5	75.01
7	Sonia Lafuente	Spain	110.78	8	37.10	7	73.68
8	Chloe Ing	Singapore	110.42	7	38.48	8	71.94
9	Jennifer Parker	Germany	106.99	9	36.63	9	70.36
10	Frances Clare Untalan	Philippines	106.92	5	45.18	11	61.74
11	Mary Ro Reyes	Mexico	95.25	11	30.14	10	65.11

=== Pairs ===
Rank	Name	Nation	Total points	SP		FS	
1	Meagan Duhamel / Eric Radford	Canada	203.16	1	68.92	1	134.24
2	Haven Denney / Brandon Frazier	United States	167.28	4	51.66	2	115.62
3	Jessica Calalang / Zack Sidhu	United States	156.46	2	59.02	3	97.44
4	Natasha Purich / Andrew Wolfe	Canada	147.95	3	54.84	5	93.11
5	Vanessa Grenier / Maxime Deschamps	Canada	145.00	6	47.66	4	97.34
6	Vasilisa Davankova / Alexander Enbert	Russia	142.60	5	51.50	6	91.10
7	Brittany Jones / Joshua Reagan	Canada	127.24	8	39.92	7	87.32
8	Caitlin Yankowskas / Hamish Gaman	Great Britain	119.71	7	46.08	8	73.63
9	Narumi Takahashi / Ryuichi Kihara	Japan	112.42	9	39.80	9	72.62

=== Ice dance ===
Rank	Name	Nation	Total points	SD		FD	
1	Gabriella Papadakis / Guillaume Cizeron	France	150.20	1	59.74	1	90.46
2	Piper Gilles / Paul Poirier	Canada	142.52	4	53.42	2	89.10
3	Laurence Fournier Beaudry / Nikolaj Sørensen	Denmark	131.62	5	53.34	3	78.28
4	Alexandra Paul / Mitchell Islam	Canada	130.70	2	55.30	5	75.40
5	Sara Hurtado / Adrià Díaz	Spain	129.36	3	54.12	6	75.24
6	Nicole Orford / Thomas Williams	Canada	125.10	6	47.90	4	77.20
7	Anastasia Olson / Ian Lorello	United States	116.48	7	47.48	8	69.00
8	Andréanne Poulin / Marc-André Servant	Canada	111.46	10	41.90	7	69.56
9	Carter Marie Jones / Richard Sharpe	Great Britain	105.94	11	39.80	10	66.14
10	Cortney Mansour / Michal Češka	Czech Republic	105.62	8	43.42	11	62.20
11	Celia Robledo / Luis Fenero	Spain	104.20	13	36.74	9	67.46
12	Alissandra Aronow / Collin Brubaker	United States	103.56	9	42.48	12	61.08
13	Pilar Maekawa Moreno / Leonardo Maekawa Moreno	Mexico	99.22	12	39.78	13	59.44
14	Tatiana Kozmava / Aleksandr Zolotarev	Georgia	91.20	14	34.16	14	57.04
