= Colin McManus =

American ice dancer

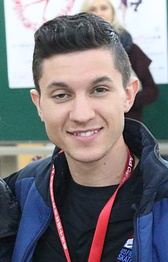

Personal information
- Born: March 10, 1990 (age 36) Melrose, Massachusetts, U.S.
- Height: 6 ft 0 in (1.83 m)

Figure skating career
- Country: United States
- Partner: Anastasia Cannuscio
- Coach: Karen Ludington, Christie Moxley
- Skating club: Skating Club of Boston
- Began skating: 1997
- Retired: May 2017

Colin McManus (born March 10, 1990) is an American former competitive ice dancer. With his skating partner, Anastasia Cannuscio, he is the 2013 Ice Challenge champion, a three-time bronze medalist on the ISU Challenger Series, and the 2016 U.S. national pewter medalist.

== Personal life ==
McManus was born on March 10, 1990, in Melrose, Massachusetts. He married American ice dancer Isabella Cannuscio, his skating partner's sister, on May 27, 2018. On November 27, 2021, the couple announced they were expecting their first child, a boy, due in May 2022. Finn James McManus was born on May 16, 2022.

== Career ==
Colin McManus teamed up with Anastasia Cannuscio in March 2008. They were coached by Karen Ludington, Christie Moxley-Hutson, and Alexandr Kirsanov at the University of Delaware in Newark, Delaware. The two debuted on the ISU Junior Grand Prix series in autumn 2009.

Cannuscio/McManus won a silver medal at the 2010 Junior Grand Prix event in France and bronze on the junior level at the 2011 U.S. Championships. They were sent to the 2011 World Junior Championships and finished 7th.

Cannuscio/McManus made their senior-level debut at the 2011 Ondrej Nepela Memorial. They finished seventh at their first Grand Prix event, the 2012 Skate America. The following season, they won gold at the 2013 Ice Challenge.

In the 2014–2015 season, Cannuscio/McManus took bronze at both of their ISU Challenger Series events – the Finlandia Trophy and the U.S. International Classic. They placed fifth at their Grand Prix assignment, the 2014 Skate America, as well as the 2015 U.S. Championships.

Cannuscio/McManus received the pewter medal for fourth place at the 2016 U.S. Championships. They announced their retirement from competition in May 2017.

== Programs ==
(with Cannuscio)

Season	Short dance	Free dance	Exhibition
2016–2017	Blues: Harlem Nocturne by Duke Ellington; Hip hop: Puttin' On The Ritz featuring Lari Hall	Time by Billy Porter; Beyond The Sky by Karl Hugo; Time by Billy Porter	
2015–2016	Cinderella by Sergei Prokofiev: Waltz: No 37 Waltz-Coda; March: No 18 The Clock choreo. by Karen Ludington	Ninth Symphony; Moonlight Sonata; Fifth Symphony by Ludwig van Beethoven choreo. by Karen Ludington	Gravity by Sara Bareilles
2014–2015	Paso doble: Hora Zero by Rodrigo y Gabriela; Flamenco: Ameksa by the Taalbi Brothers	Danse macabre by Arthur Fiedler; Transylvanian Lullaby by Gil Shaham; Danse macabre by Arthur Fiedler	
2013–2014	Puttin' On the Ritz; Get Happy by Rufus Wainwright	An American in Paris by Leonard Bernstein	
2012–2013	Polka: Éljen a Magyar!, Op. 332; Waltz: Accelerationen, Op. 234 both by Johann Strauss II, performed by Willi Boskovsky and Wiener Johann Strauss Orchestra	Comanche by The Revels; Please, Mr. Jailer by Rachel Sweet; Jailhouse Rock by West End Orchestra and Singers	
2011–2012	Mas que nada by Sérgio Mendes, The Black Eyed Peas; Magalenha by Sérgio Mendes	The Way You Look Tonight by Adam Levine; Unforgettable by Nat King Cole, Natalie Cole; Get Me To The Church by Frank Sinatra	
2010–2011	Waltz: It's a Man's Man's Man's World by James Brown; Tango: Bust Your Windows by Jazmine Sullivan	Carmen Fantasie by David Garrett; Cavatina (from The Deer Hunter by Stanley Myers	
	Original dance		
2009–2010	Complainte de la Butte by Rufus Wainwright; La Foule by Édith Piaf	Love Story by Francis Lai performed by the BBC Orchestra	
2008–2009	I Want to Be Loved By You by Marilyn Monroe; Five Foot Two, Eyes of Blue by Spike Jones and His City Slickers	Who's that Creepin'?; I Wanna Be Like You by Big Bad Voodoo Daddy	

== Competitive highlights ==
GP: Grand Prix; CS: Challenger Series; JGP: Junior Grand Prix

=== With Cannuscio ===
International
Event	08–09	09–10	10–11	11–12	12–13	13–14	14–15	15–16	16–17
GP Cup of China									7th
GP NHK Trophy								6th	8th
GP Skate America					7th		5th	5th	
CS Finlandia							3rd		
CS Nebelhorn								3rd	
CS Ondrej Nepela									7th
CS Tallinn Trophy								4th	
CS U.S. Classic					6th	8th	3rd		
Ice Challenge						1st			
Ondrej Nepela				5th					
International: Junior
Junior Worlds			7th						
JGP Belarus		7th							
JGP France			2nd						
JGP Japan			4th						
JGP Turkey		7th							
National
U.S. Champ.	10th J	7th J	3rd J	6th	6th	7th	5th	4th	6th
Eastern Sect.			2nd J	2nd	2nd				
J = Junior level

=== With McDermott ===
National
Event	07–08
U.S. Championships	6th N
Levels: N = Novice
