= 2014 Skate Canada International =

- Type: Grand Prix
- Date: October 31 – November 2
- Season: 2014–15
- Location: Kelowna, British Columbia
- Host: Skate Canada
- Venue: Prospera Place

Champions
- Men's singles: (Japan) Takahito Mura
- Ladies' singles: (Russia) Anna Pogorilaya
- Pairs: (Canada) Meagan Duhamel / Eric Radford
- Ice dance: (Canada) Kaitlyn Weaver / Andrew Poje
- Previous: 2013 Skate Canada International
- Next: 2015 Skate Canada International
- Previous Grand Prix: 2014 Skate America
- Next Grand Prix: 2014 Cup of China

The 2014 Skate Canada International was the second event of six in the 2014–15 ISU Grand Prix of Figure Skating, a senior-level international invitational competition series. It was held at the Prospera Place in Kelowna, British Columbia, on October 31 – November 2. Medals were awarded in the disciplines of men's singles, ladies' singles, pair skating, and ice dancing. Skaters earned points toward qualifying for the 2014–15 Grand Prix Final.

== Entries ==
| Country | Men | Ladies | Pairs | Ice dancing |
|---|---|---|---|---|
| Australia | | Brooklee Han | | |
| Canada | Liam Firus; Andrei Rogozine | Alaine Chartrand; Veronik Mallet; Julianne Séguin | Meagan Duhamel / Eric Radford; Brittany Jones / Joshua Reagan; Kirsten Moore-Towers / Michael Marinaro | Kaitlyn Weaver / Andrew Poje; Piper Gilles / Paul Poirier; Élisabeth Paradis / François-Xavier Ouellette |
| China | | | Sui Wenjing / Han Cong | |
| Czech Republic | Michal Březina | | | |
| France | Florent Amodio | | Vanessa James / Morgan Ciprès | |
| Germany | | | Mari Vartmann / Aaron Van Cleave | Nelli Zhiganshina / Alexander Gazsi |
| Japan | Takahito Mura; Takahiko Kozuka | Rika Hongo; Satoko Miyahara | | |
| South Korea | | Kim Hae-jin | | |
| Russia | Konstantin Menshov | Alena Leonova; Anna Pogorilaya | Evgenia Tarasova / Vladimir Morozov | Ksenia Monko / Kirill Khaliavin |
| Spain | Javier Fernández | | | Sara Hurtado / Adria Diaz |
| Sweden | | Viktoria Helgesson | | |
| United States | Max Aaron; Stephen Carriere; Adam Rippon | Ashley Wagner; Courtney Hicks | Madeline Aaron / Max Settlage | Madison Hubbell / Zachary Donohue; Alexandra Aldridge / Daniel Eaton |

=== Changes to preliminary assignments ===
- On July 10, Felicia Zhang and Nathan Bartholomay were removed from the roster. On July 15, Madeline Aaron / Max Settlage were named as replacements. On July 16, it was revealed that Zhang/Bartholomay had split up.
- On August 4, Alaine Chartrand was added as a host pick.
- On September 9, Valentina Marchei was removed from the roster due to an injury. On September 17, she was replaced by Viktoria Helgesson.
- On September 16, Kaetlyn Osmond withdrew due to injury. On September 17, she was replaced by Julianne Séguin.
- On September 23, Alexander Majorov was removed from the roster. No reason has been given. On October 1, Zhan Bush was announced as his replacement.
- On October 16, Zhan Bush was removed from the roster due to health problems. On October 21, Stephen Carriere was announced as his replacement.
- On October 17, Nathalie Weinzierl was removed from the roster. No reason has been given. On October 22, Brooklee Han was announced as her replacement.
- On October 27, Kevin Reynolds withdrew due to an injury. He was replaced by Andrei Rogozine.
- On October 30, Elladj Balde was removed from the roster due to a concussion. He was not replaced.

== Results ==
=== Men ===
| Rank | Name | Nation | Total points | SP | | FS | |
|---|---|---|---|---|---|---|---|
| 1 | Takahito Mura | Japan | 255.81 | 2 | 82.57 | 1 | 173.24 |
| 2 | Javier Fernández | Spain | 244.87 | 1 | 86.36 | 2 | 158.51 |
| 3 | Max Aaron | United States | 231.77 | 5 | 76.50 | 3 | 155.27 |
| 4 | Stephen Carriere | United States | 231.67 | 4 | 80.33 | 4 | 151.34 |
| 5 | Konstantin Menshov | Russia | 225.03 | 3 | 81.70 | 6 | 143.33 |
| 6 | Florent Amodio | France | 215.71 | 8 | 72.14 | 5 | 143.57 |
| 7 | Michal Březina | Czech Republic | 208.24 | 7 | 73.29 | 8 | 134.95 |
| 8 | Takahiko Kozuka | Japan | 203.17 | 6 | 75.85 | 11 | 127.32 |
| 9 | Andrei Rogozine | Canada | 202.40 | 9 | 70.95 | 10 | 131.45 |
| 10 | Adam Rippon | United States | 201.92 | 11 | 62.83 | 7 | 139.09 |
| 11 | Liam Firus | Canada | 198.91 | 10 | 64.94 | 9 | 133.97 |

=== Ladies ===
| Rank | Name | Nation | Total points | SP | | FS | |
|---|---|---|---|---|---|---|---|
| 1 | Anna Pogorilaya | Russia | 191.81 | 1 | 65.28 | 1 | 126.53 |
| 2 | Ashley Wagner | United States | 186.00 | 2 | 63.86 | 2 | 122.14 |
| 3 | Satoko Miyahara | Japan | 181.75 | 4 | 60.22 | 3 | 121.53 |
| 4 | Courtney Hicks | United States | 174.51 | 8 | 56.36 | 4 | 118.15 |
| 5 | Rika Hongo | Japan | 171.47 | 5 | 59.10 | 5 | 112.37 |
| 6 | Alena Leonova | Russia | 164.15 | 3 | 62.54 | 6 | 101.61 |
| 7 | Alaine Chartrand | Canada | 156.22 | 7 | 57.06 | 7 | 99.16 |
| 8 | Brooklee Han | Australia | 146.80 | 11 | 51.55 | 8 | 95.25 |
| 9 | Kim Hae-jin | South Korea | 143.43 | 10 | 52.18 | 10 | 91.25 |
| 10 | Veronik Mallet | Canada | 142.25 | 6 | 57.45 | 11 | 84.80 |
| 11 | Viktoria Helgesson | Sweden | 139.67 | 12 | 44.66 | 9 | 95.01 |
| 12 | Julianne Séguin | Canada | 136.95 | 9 | 52.74 | 12 | 84.21 |

=== Pairs ===
| Rank | Name | Nation | Total points | SP | | FS | |
|---|---|---|---|---|---|---|---|
| 1 | Meagan Duhamel / Eric Radford | Canada | 210.74 | 1 | 72.70 | 1 | 138.04 |
| 2 | Sui Wenjing / Han Cong | China | 184.64 | 2 | 65.22 | 2 | 119.42 |
| 3 | Evgenia Tarasova / Vladimir Morozov | Russia | 175.45 | 3 | 64.14 | 3 | 111.31 |
| 4 | Madeline Aaron / Max Settlage | United States | 165.91 | 4 | 57.20 | 4 | 108.71 |
| 5 | Vanessa James / Morgan Ciprès | France | 161.79 | 5 | 56.47 | 5 | 105.32 |
| 6 | Kirsten Moore-Towers / Michael Marinaro | Canada | 158.82 | 6 | 53.79 | 6 | 105.03 |
| 7 | Brittany Jones / Joshua Reagan | Canada | 146.77 | 7 | 49.80 | 8 | 96.97 |
| 8 | Mari Vartmann / Aaron Van Cleave | Germany | 145.89 | 8 | 48.43 | 7 | 97.46 |

=== Ice dancing ===
| Rank | Name | Nation | Total points | SD | | FD | |
|---|---|---|---|---|---|---|---|
| 1 | Kaitlyn Weaver / Andrew Poje | Canada | 171.10 | 1 | 68.61 | 1 | 102.49 |
| 2 | Piper Gilles / Paul Poirier | Canada | 152.60 | 4 | 57.35 | 2 | 95.25 |
| 3 | Madison Hubbell / Zachary Donohue | United States | 148.23 | 3 | 59.29 | 3 | 88.94 |
| 4 | Ksenia Monko / Kirill Khaliavin | Russia | 143.48 | 2 | 59.62 | 6 | 83.86 |
| 5 | Nelli Zhiganshina / Alexander Gazsi | Germany | 140.95 | 6 | 55.35 | 4 | 85.60 |
| 6 | Alexandra Aldridge / Daniel Eaton | United States | 137.37 | 5 | 56.13 | 7 | 81.24 |
| 7 | Élisabeth Paradis / François-Xavier Ouellette | Canada | 134.48 | 8 | 50.35 | 5 | 84.13 |
| 8 | Sara Hurtado / Adrià Díaz | Spain | 127.99 | 7 | 52.43 | 8 | 75.56 |
