= Zack Sidhu =

American pair skater

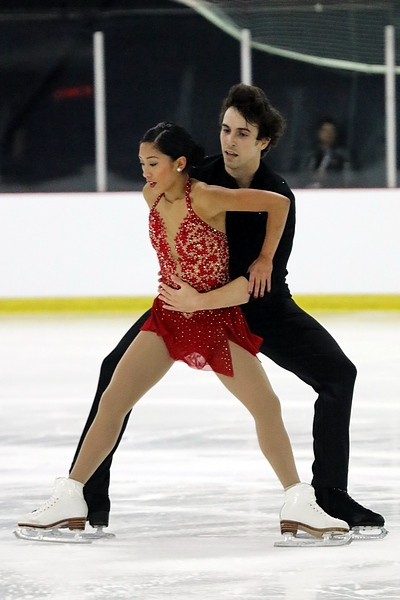
- Jessica Calalang, Zack Sidhu - 2017 CS Autumn Classic International

Personal information
- Born: October 21, 1991 (age 34) San Dimas, California, U.S.
- Height: 6 ft 0 in (1.83 m)

Figure skating career
- Country: United States
- Discipline: Pair skating
- Partner: Jessica Calalang (2010–18); Tori Vollmer (2009–10)
- Began skating: 1997

Zack Sidhu (born October 21, 1991) is an American pair skater. With Jessica Calalang, he won three medals on the ISU Challenger Series – bronze at the 2014 CS Skate Canada Autumn Classic and silver at the 2014 and 2016 CS U.S. International Classic. The pair also won silver at the 2013 International Cup of Nice.

== Personal life ==
Zack Sidhu was born on October 21, 1991, in San Dimas, California. He is interested in software engineering.

== Career ==
Sidhu skated with Arielle Trujillo from 2001 to 2003 and with Jennifer Osibov in 2005. He and Tori Vollmer teamed up in 2008 and competed in one ISU Junior Grand Prix event before splitting in 2010.

Sidhu teamed up with Jessica Calalang in August 2010. They made their JGP debut in 2010 in Ostrava, Czech Republic. The following season, they won a bronze medal at the 2011 JGP competition in Tallinn, Estonia. After winning the junior silver medal at the 2013 U.S. Championships, they were assigned to the 2013 World Junior Championships in Milan, Italy, where they finished ninth.

Calalang/Sidhu moved up to the senior level in the 2013–14 season. They won silver at the 2013 International Cup of Nice but finished 11th at the 2014 U.S. Championships. The pair began the following season on the ISU Challenger Series, winning silver at the 2014 CS U.S. International Classic and bronze at the 2014 CS Skate Canada Autumn Classic, before making their Grand Prix debut at the 2014 Cup of China.

== Programs ==
=== With Calalang ===
| Season | Short program | Free skating | Exhibition |
|---|---|---|---|
| 2017–2018 | Kiss by Prince | Carmen Suite by Rodion Shchedrin | |
| 2016–2017 | The Prayer performed by Andrea Bocelli, Celine Dion | Carmen Suite by Rodion Shchedrin | |
| 2015–2016 | It's a Man's Man's Man's World performed by Seal | Romeo and Juliet by Nino Rota | |
| 2014–2015 | My One and Only by George Gershwin | Romeo and Juliet by Nino Rota | All of Me by John Legend |
| 2013–2014 | Hernando's Hideaway by Richard Adler and Jerry Ross | The Beatles Concerto by John Rutter | |
| 2012–2013 | Elite Syncopations by Scott Joplin | The Artist by Ludovic Bource | |
| 2011–2012 | Elite Syncopations by Scott Joplin | Miss Saigon by Claude-Michel Schönberg | Peace, Love, and Happiness by G. Love & Special Sauce |
| 2010–2011 | Summertime by George Gershwin | Adagio (from Spartacus) by Aram Khachaturian, the Armenian Philharmonic Orchestra | |

=== With Vollmer ===
| Season | Short program | Free skating |
|---|---|---|
| 2009–2010 | A Day in the Life by The Beatles | West Side Story by Leonard Bernstein |

== Competitive highlights ==
GP: Grand Prix; CS: Challenger Series; JGP: Junior Grand Prix

=== With Calalang ===
International
| Event | 10–11 | 11–12 | 12–13 | 13–14 | 14–15 | 15–16 | 16–17 | 17–18 |
|---|---|---|---|---|---|---|---|---|
| GP Cup of China | | | | | 7th | | | |
| GP Rostelecom | | | | | 5th | | | |
| GP NHK Trophy | | | | | | 7th | | |
| CS Autumn Classic | | | | | 3rd | | | 6th |
| CS Finlandia | | | | | | | | 7th |
| CS Ice Challenge | | | | | | 4th | | |
| CS U.S. Classic | | | | | 2nd | | 2nd | |
| Cup of Nice | | | | 2nd | | | | |
International: Junior
| Junior Worlds | | | 9th | | | | | |
| JGP Austria | | | 6th | | | | | |
| JGP Croatia | | | 8th | | | | | |
| JGP Czech Rep. | 10th | | | | | | | |
| JGP Estonia | | 3rd | | | | | | |
| JGP Poland | | 4th | | | | | | |
National
| U.S. Champ. | 8th J | 4th J | 2nd J | 11th | 5th | 5th | WD | 9th |
J = Junior level; WD = Withdrew

=== With Vollmer ===
International
| Event | 2009–10 |
|---|---|
| JGP Poland | 8th |
