= Richard Dornbush =

American figure skater

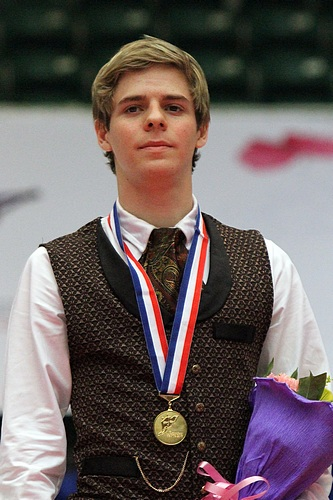
- Dornbush in 2010

Personal information
- Born: August 27, 1991 (age 34) Corona, California, U.S.
- Height: 5 ft 8 in (1.72 m)

Figure skating career
- Country: United States
- Discipline: Men's singles
- Began skating: 1997
- Retired: 2018
U.S. Championships
Silver medal – second place	2011 Greensboro	Singles
Junior Grand Prix Final
Gold medal – first place	2010–11 Beijing	Singles
Bronze medal – third place	2008–09 Goyang	Singles

Richard Dornbush (born August 27, 1991) is an American former figure skater. He is the 2014 Lombardia Trophy champion, the 2010–11 Junior Grand Prix Final champion, and the 2011 U.S. National silver medalist.

== Personal life ==
Richard Dornbush was born in Corona, California. He has three older sisters. He played the violin for six years. After studying physics at Riverside Community College, he transferred to the University of California, San Diego and joined Earl Warren College. As of 2016, he was an undergraduate student in computational physics and intended to pursue a master's degree and a career in finance with a focus on quantitative analysis.

== Career ==
Richard Dornbush was coached by Tammy Gambill since 1997 at Icetown Riverside in Riverside, California.

During the 2008–09 season, Dornbush won the gold medal at both the 2008 JGP Mexico and the 2008 JGP South Africa. He qualified for the Junior Grand Prix Final, where he won the bronze medal.

During the 2009–10 season, Dornbush won the gold medal at the 2009 JGP Hungary. He placed fifth in his other event, the 2009 JGP Germany, but qualified for the 2009–10 JGP Final, where he finished fourth. Dornbush finished eleventh at the 2010 U.S. Nationals.

Dornbush was one of twenty young skaters to receive a scholarship from the Michael Weiss Foundation.

During the 2010–11 season, Dornbush won the Junior Grand Prix Final. At the 2011 U.S. Nationals, he placed seventh in the short program and first in the free skate to win the silver medal. He was selected to compete at the 2011 World Championships, where he finished ninth.

Dornbush finished thirteenth at the 2012 U.S. Championships. After Jeremy Abbott withdrew from the 2012 Four Continents Championships, Dornbush was chosen to replace him.

Dornbush placed sixth at the 2013 U.S. Championships. He was named as an alternate for the 2013 Four Continents Championships and was called up when Adam Rippon withdrew.

During the 2014–15 season, Dornbush won the gold medal at his ISU Challenger Series assignment, the 2014 Lombardia Trophy. Turning to the Grand Prix series, he won a bronze medal at the 2014 Cup of China and finished seventh at the 2014 Trophée Éric Bompard before capping off the season with a tenth place finish at the 2015 U.S. Championships.

During the 2015–16 season, Dornbush trained with both Tammy Gambill in Riverside and Jonathan Cassar at IceTown Carlsbad. He finished sixth at the 2015 U.S. International Classic, seventh at the 2015 Cup of China, and eighth at the 2015 NHK Trophy. He withdrew from the 2016 U.S. Championships due to a herniated disc in his back. Dornbush retired from skating in 2018.

== Programs ==
Season	Short program	Free skate	Exhibition	Ref.
2007–08	La Virgen de la Macarena Performed by Genaro Nuñez	Celtic medley	—N/a	
2008–09	La Virgen de la Macarena Performed by Genaro Nuñez	Backdraft By Hans Zimmer	—N/a	
2009–10	"Paint It Black" By The Rolling Stones	Piano Concerto No. 1 By Sergei Rachmaninoff	—N/a	
2010–11	"Elena" By Brian Setzer	Sherlock Holmes By Hans Zimmer Choreo. by Cindy Stuart	"I'm Your Boogie Man" By KC and the Sunshine Band	
2011–12	Symphony No. 5 By Ludwig van Beethoven Performed by David Garrett Choreo. by Justin Dillon	"A Fistful of Dollars"; "The Ecstasy of Gold" Both by Ennio Morricone; William Tell Overture By Gioachino Rossini Choreo. by Cindy Stuart	—N/a	
2012–13	"With or Without You" By U2	"The Wild Ones"; "Harlem Nocturne"; "Rooftop"	—N/a	
2013–14	"The Sons of Italy" By Henry Mancini	The Beatles medley	"Let's Get On"; "Staying Alive"	
2014–15	"The Sons of Italy" By Henry Mancini	"Yellow"; "Viva la Vida" Both by Coldplay	—N/a	
2015–16	"Come What May" From Moulin Rouge! By David Baerwald Performed by Ewan McGregor & Nicole Kidman	"Yellow"; "Viva la Vida" Both by Coldplay	—N/a	

== Competitive highlights ==
- GP – Event of the ISU Grand Prix Series
- JGP – Event of the ISU Junior Grand Prix Series
- CS – Event of the ISU Challenger Series

Competition placements at senior level
Season	2009–10	2010–11	2011–12	2012–13	2013–14	2014–15	2015–16
World Championships		9th					
Four Continents Championships			13th	5th	5th		
U.S. Championships	11th	2nd	13th	6th	5th	10th	
GP Cup of China			6th		5th	3rd	7th
GP NHK Trophy				5th			8th
GP Rostelecom Cup				6th	5th		
GP Skate America			4th				
GP Trophée Éric Bompard						7th	
CS Lombardia Trophy						1st	
CS U.S. Classic							6th
Finlandia Trophy				2nd	4th		

Competition placements at junior level
Season	2006–07	2007–08	2008–09	2009–10	2010–11
Junior Grand Prix Final			3rd	4th	1st
U.S. Championships	8th	4th			
JGP Austria		6th			4th
JGP Germany				5th	1st
JGP Hungary				1st	
JGP Mexico			1st		
JGP South Africa			1st		
Gardena Spring Trophy	1st				

== Detailed results ==
ISU personal best scores in the +3/-3 GOE System
Segment	Type	Score	Event
Total	TSS	237.28	2014 CS Lombardia Trophy
Short program	TSS	83.01	2013 Four Continents Championships
Short program	TES	45.48	2013 Four Continents Championships
Short program	PCS	38.79	2014 Trophée Éric Bompard
Free skating	TSS	157.92	2014 CS Lombardia Trophy
Free skating	TES	79.97	2010–11 Junior Grand Prix Final
Free skating	PCS	81.00	2014 CS Lombardia Trophy
