= Éljen a Magyar! =

Polka composed by Johann Strauss II

Éljen a Magyar! (Hungarian: [ˈeːjːɛn ˈɒː ˈmɒɟɒr], "Long live the Magyar!"), Op. 332, is a polka composed by Johann Strauss II. It was first performed at the Redoutensaal building in Pest in March 1869, two years after the Austro-Hungarian Compromise of 1867. The work was dedicated "to the Hungarian Nation". The coda of the work features a fleeting quotation from the Rákóczi March, which Hector Berlioz had earlier utilised in his La damnation de Faust.
