= Max Settlage =

American pair skater (born 1992)

Personal information
- Full name: Max Frederick Settlage
- Born: July 1, 1992 (age 34) Thừa Thiên–Huế Province, Vietnam
- Home town: Flagstaff, Arizona, U.S.
- Height: 5 ft 10 in (1.77 m)

Figure skating career
- Country: United States
- Skating club: Broadmoor SC
- Began skating: 2002
- Retired: February 13, 2019

Max Settlage (born July 1, 1992) is an American former pair skater. With former partner Madeline Aaron, he is the 2014 CS U.S. Classic bronze medalist, a two-time U.S. national pewter medalist (2015–2016), and the 2014 U.S. national junior champion.

== Personal life ==
Max Settlage was born on July 1, 1992, in Thừa Thiên–Huế Province, Vietnam. After being adopted, he was raised in Flagstaff, Arizona. He is a cartoonist, who has done illustrations for U.S. Figure Skating.

== Career ==
Settlage began skating at age ten. His first pair skating partner was Caitlin Fields. In the 2007–08 season, they won the juvenile silver medal at the U.S. Junior Championships and the intermediate silver medal in the 2008–09 season.

=== Partnership with Aaron ===
Settlage was paired with Madeline Aaron in May 2010 by coach Dalilah Sappenfield. The pair, both clockwise jumpers, moved from Arizona to Colorado for training.

Aaron/Settlage began competing on the ISU Junior Grand Prix series in 2011. They won two JGP medals – bronze in Lake Placid in 2012 and silver in Belarus in 2013. After winning the U.S. national junior title in January 2014, they were sent to the World Junior Championships and placed fifth.

Aaron/Settlage moved up to the senior level in the 2014–15 season. They were chosen to compete at the 2014 Skate Canada International after Zhang/Bartholomay's withdrawal. They were awarded the pewter medal for fourth place at the 2015 U.S. Championships.

After Settlage developed a lower back injury, in August 2015, the pair missed about three months of training. Aaron sustained a mild concussion in the summer when she fell on a mohawk turn. The pair decided to withdraw from their Grand Prix event, the 2015 Cup of China, and returned to competition at the 2015 CS Tallinn Trophy, where they placed fifth. At the 2016 U.S. Championships, they won the pewter medal for the second consecutive year.

Interviewed in late June 2016, Aaron/Settlage said that they planned to use a revised version of their 2015–16 short program and Scheherazade for their free skate. They were invited to the 2016 Skate America but withdrew from the event due to the end of their partnership. They made the announcement on August 10, 2016, with Settlage saying that he wanted to continue competing.

=== Later career ===
Settlage teamed up with Winter Deardorff in late February 2017.

== Programs ==
(with Aaron)

Season	Short program	Free skating	Exhibition
2016–2017	Hymne à l'amour by Édith Piaf choreo. by Julie Marcotte	Scheherazade	
2015–2016	Hymne à l'amour by Édith Piaf choreo. by Julie Marcotte	La bohème by Giacomo Puccini choreo. by Julie Marcotte	Are You Gonna Be My Girl by Jet
2014–2015	Coppélia by Léo Delibes choreo. by Julie Marcotte	The King and I by Richard Rodgers choreo. by Julie Marcotte	Boot Scootin' Boogie by Brooks & Dunn; All of Me by John Legend
2013–2014	The Chairman's Waltz (from Memoirs of a Geisha) by John Williams	Adagio of Spartacus and Phrygia (from Spartacus) by Aram Khachaturian choreo. by Julie Marcotte	Ave Maria by Franz Schubert performed by Celine Dion
2012–2013	The Swan (from The Carnival of the Animals) by Camille Saint-Saëns	Carmen Suite by Georges Bizet, Rodion Shchedrin	
2011–2012	El Conquistador by Maxime Rodriguez	Romeo and Juliet by Timothy Atack; Romeo and Juliet by Sergei Prokofiev	
2010–2011	Clair de lune (from Suite bergamasque) by Claude Debussy	The Nutcracker by Pyotr Tchaikovsky	

== Competitive highlights ==
GP: Grand Prix; CS: Challenger Series; JGP: Junior Grand Prix

=== With Deardorff ===
International
Event	17–18	18–19
CS U.S. Classic		4th
National
U.S. Championships	12th	10th

=== With Aaron ===
International
Event	11–12	12–13	13–14	14–15	15–16
GP Skate America				5th	
GP Skate Canada				4th	
CS Nebelhorn				6th	
CS Tallinn Trophy					5th
CS U.S. Classic				3rd	
International: Junior
Junior Worlds			5th		
JGP Belarus			2nd		
JGP Croatia		7th			
JGP Estonia			4th		
JGP Poland	5th				
JGP USA		3rd			
National
U.S. Champ.	6th J	3rd J	1st J	4th	4th
Levels: N = Novice; J = Junior. WD = Withdrew
