= Federica Testa =

Italian-born competitive ice dancer

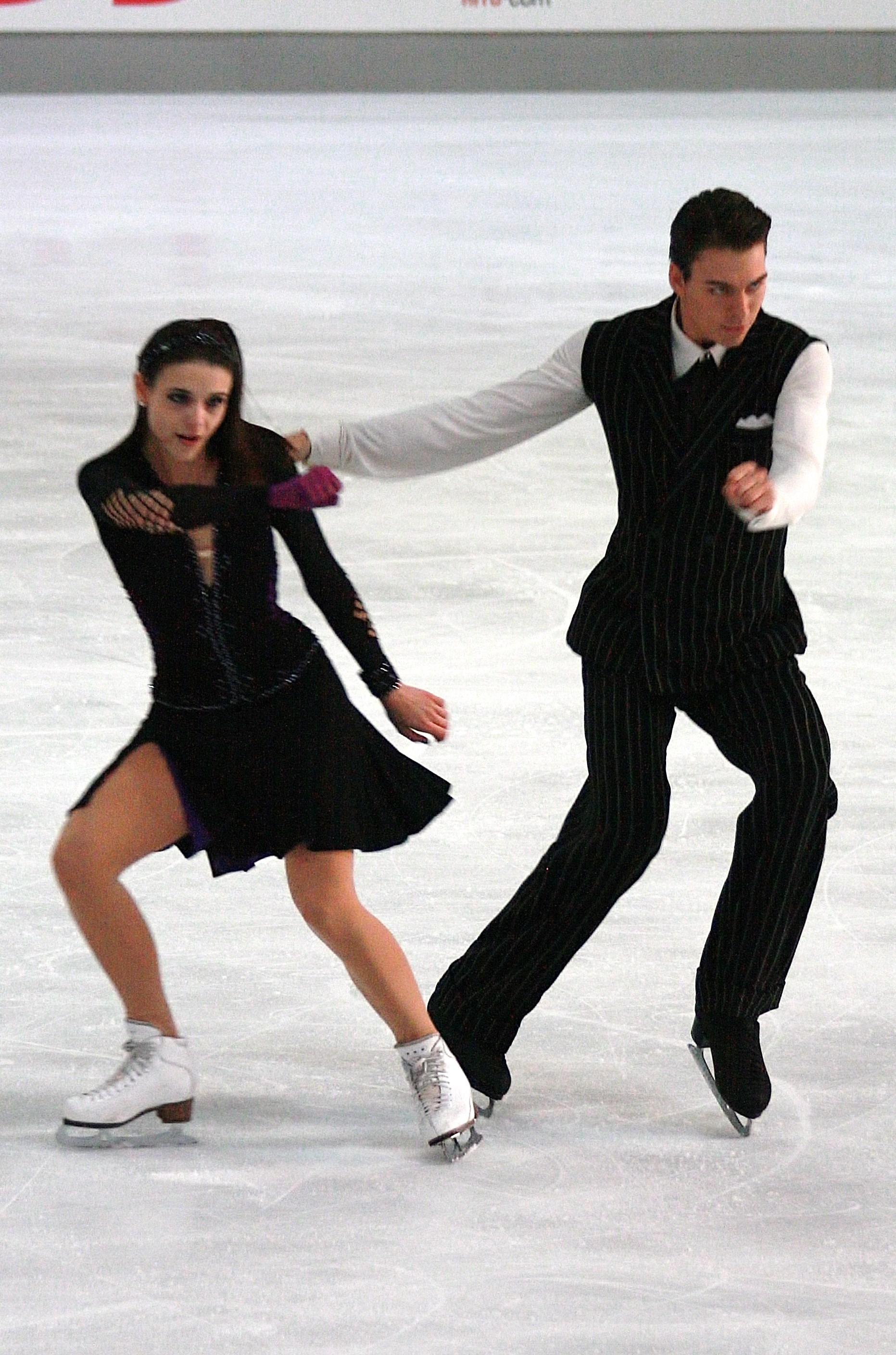
- Testa with Csölley in 2013

Personal information
- Born: 27 August 1993 (age 33) Milan, Italy
- Home town: Milan
- Height: 1.68 m (5 ft 6 in)

Figure skating career
- Country: Slovakia (2012–16); Italy (until 2011)
- Began skating: 1999
- Retired: July 11, 2016

Medal record
Representing Italy
Italian Championships
Gold medal – first place	2011 Milan	Ice dance
Bronze medal – third place	2010 Brescia	Ice dance

Federica Testa (born 27 August 1993) is an Italian-born former competitive ice dancer who is best known for her partnership with Lukáš Csölley for Slovakia. Together, they won four ISU Challenger Series medals and three Slovak national titles. They achieved their best ISU Championship result, 8th, at the 2015 and 2016 European Championships.

Testa competed with Christopher Mior and Andrea Malnati for Italy until 2011.

== Personal life ==
Federica Testa was born on 27 August 1993 in Milan, Italy. She became a Slovak citizen in autumn 2013.

== Early career ==
Testa skated in singles for two years, stopped skating for a year, and then took up ice dancing. She competed with Andrea Malnati for seven years, representing Italy. Testa/Malnati were the 2009 Italian junior silver medalists.

In the spring of 2009, Testa teamed up with Canadian Christopher Mior, continuing to represent Italy. The duo competed at the senior level and became the 2011 Italian national champions. Following their split, Testa skated briefly with a Finnish skater.

== Partnership with Csölley ==
In October 2011, it was announced that Testa would compete with Lukáš Csölley for Slovakia. Testa/Csölley made their international debut at the Bavarian Open in February 2012 and then competed at the World Championships in March in Nice, France. The following season, they finished 17th at the 2013 European Championships in Zagreb, Croatia, having placed 19th in the short dance and 16th in the free dance. At the 2013 World Championships in London, Ontario, Canada, the two placed 26th in the short dance and did not advance further.

In September 2013, Testa/Csölley competed at the final Olympic qualifying event, the Nebelhorn Trophy; they finished ninth and became the first alternates for the 2014 Winter Olympics. In January 2014, they placed 12th at the European Championships in Budapest, Hungary but the two missed the cut-off for the free dance in March at the World Championships in Saitama, Japan.

Testa/Csölley began the 2014–15 season with a bronze medal at the 2014 Ondrej Nepela Trophy, an ISU Challenger Series (CS) event held in early October. Later that month, making their Grand Prix debut, they placed fourth in the short dance and seventh overall at the 2014 Skate America. In November, they were awarded gold at two CS competitions, the Volvo Open Cup and Warsaw Cup. They finished eighth overall at the 2015 European Championships in Stockholm, Sweden. In March, they placed 15th at the 2015 World Championships in Shanghai, having ranked 13th in the short and 15th in the free.

Testa/Csölley finished 8th (9th SD, 8th FD) at the 2016 European Championships in Bratislava. At the 2016 World Championships in Boston, they placed 12th in the short dance, 15th in the free, and 14th overall.

Testa/Csölley received invitations to the 2016 Skate Canada International and 2016 Trophée de France but withdrew from both Grand Prix events on 7 July 2016 due to Testa's decision to retire from competition.

== Programs ==
(with Csölley)

Season	Short dance	Free dance	Exhibition
2015–16	Waltz: Swing Time by Jerome Kern; Slow foxtrot: They Can't Take That Away From Me by George Gershwin performed by Tony Bennett; March: That's Entertainment! by Henry Mancini; The Addams Family; Waltz: A Party for Me?; Foxtrot: Main Theme; Waltz: It's An Addams by Marc Shaiman	Malèna; Passeggiata In Paese by Ennio Morricone; Kutlama by Mr. Avant Garde Folk; Ma l'amore no; Orgia by Ennio Morricone	Addams Family Values by Marc Shaiman; It's An Addams; Fester's In Love; The Big Date; The Tango; Imagine by John Lennon performed by Sam Tsui
2014–15	Flamenco: Nerva; Paso doble: Zorongo by Paco Pena; Flamenco: Que se ven desde el conquero (Faradangos de Huelva) by Pepe Romero	Enter the Circus by Christina Aguilera; Terrorklowns by Verse 13 (Jamod L. Dodson); Hurt by Christina Aguilera; Song Of Spirit by Karl Jenkins	
2013–14	Chicago by John Kander and Fred Ebb; Quickstep: Overture; Quickstep: All that Jazz; Slow foxtrot: Funny Honey; Charleston: We Both Reached For the Gun	Addams Family Values by Marc Shaiman; It's An Addams; Fester's In Love; The Big Date; The Tango	
2012–13	Radetzky March by Johann Strauss I; Die schöne Galathee by Franz von Suppé; Polka by Johann Strauss	Lilli Marleen performed by Marlene Dietrich; Sunflower by Henry Mancini; Place Rouge (from Le Concert) by Camille Adrien; Spellbound by Miklós Rózsa	
2011–12	Merengue: Pinta Me by Elvis Crespo; Samba: Baila Baila Con Migo by Domino; Rhumba by Gizelle D'Cole	Un Día Llegará by Josh Groban; Spanish Fire by Roberto Pelizzola	

== Competitive highlights ==
GP: Grand Prix; CS: Challenger Series

=== With Csölley for Slovakia ===
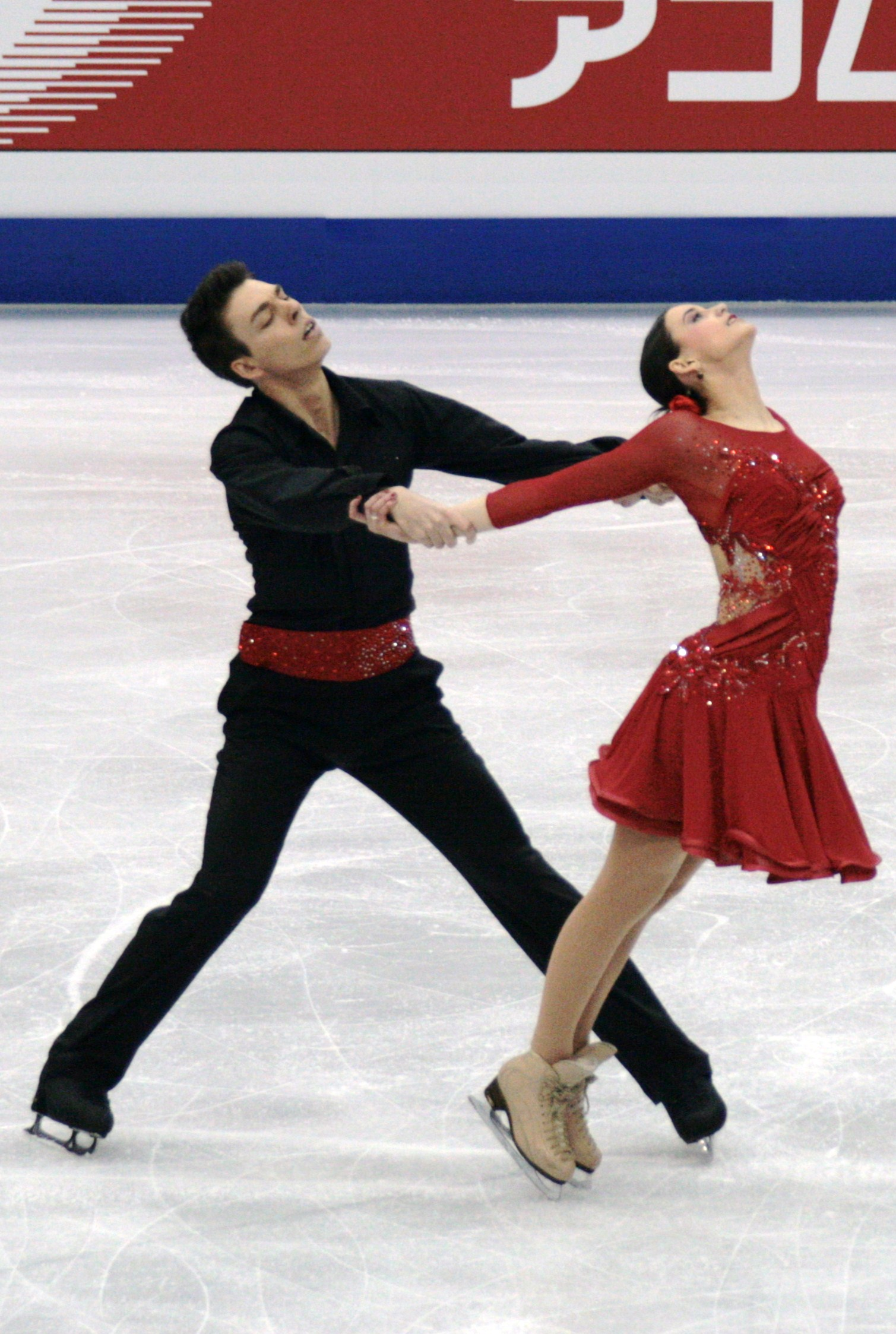
Testa and Csölley in 2012

International
Event	11–12	12–13	13–14	14–15	15–16	16–17
Worlds	27th	26th	23rd	15th	14th	
Europeans		17th	12th	8th	8th	
GP Cup of China					4th	
GP Skate Canada						WD
GP Skate America				7th		
GP Trophée						WD
CS Nepela Trophy				3rd	4th	
CS Tallinn Trophy					2nd	
CS Volvo Cup				1st		
CS Warsaw Cup				1st		
Bavarian Open	6th					
Crystal Skate		4th				
Golden Spin		8th				
Ice Challenge		9th				
Nebelhorn Trophy			9th			
Nepela Trophy		6th	4th			
New Year's Cup		2nd				
Pavel Roman		5th				
Universiade			4th	3rd		
Volvo Open Cup			4th			
National
Slovak Champ.	1st		1st	1st		
TBD: Assigned; WD: Withdrew

=== With Mior for Italy ===
International
Event	2009–10	2010–11
European Championships	22nd	18th
Finlandia Trophy		5th
Trophy of Lyon		2nd
Mont Blanc Trophy	3rd	
NRW Trophy	6th	
National
Italian Championships	3rd	1st

=== With Malnati for Italy ===
Event	2007–08	2008–09
Italian Championships	4th J	2nd J
J: Junior level
