= Douglas Razzano =

Figure skater

Personal information
- Born: October 22, 1988 (age 37) Mineola, New York, U.S.
- Home town: Scottsdale, Arizona, U.S.
- Height: 5 ft 7 in (1.70 m)

Figure skating career
- Country: United States
- Discipline: Men's singles
- Began skating: 1998
- Retired: May 19, 2015

Douglas Razzano (born October 22, 1988) is an American former competitive figure skater. He is the 2014 CS Ice Challenge champion and a silver medalist at three senior internationals — the 2014 Challenge Cup, 2011 Finlandia Trophy, and 2010 Ice Challenge. He placed fourth at the 2007 JGP Final after coming in as the first alternate.

Razzano was coached by Doug Ladret from the age of twelve. He retired from competitive skating on May 19, 2015.

== Programs ==
Season	Short program	Free skating	Exhibition
2014–2015	Ameska by the Taalbi Brothers	Piano Concerto No. 2 by Sergei Rachmaninoff	
2013–2014	Clair de Lune by Claude Debussy	Turandot; Nessun dorma by Giacomo Puccini	
2012–2013	Allegro Scherzando (from Piano Concerto No. 2) by Sergei Rachmaninoff	Queen Symphony by Tolga Kashif	
2011–2012	Allegro Scherzando (from Piano Concerto No. 2) by Sergei Rachmaninoff	Adiós Nonino; Oblivion by Astor Piazzolla; Obertura by Lisandro Adrover	
2010–2011	The Feeling Begins (from The Last Temptation of Christ) by Peter Gabriel	Adios Noninos by Astor Piazzolla	
2009–2010	Clair de Lune by Claude Debussy choreo. by Shin Amano	The Red Violin by John Corigliano choreo. by Shin Amano	
2008–2009	Etude in D Sharp Minor: Patetico by Alexander Scriabin performed by Maksim Mrvica choreo. by Renee Roca	The Red Violin by John Corigliano choreo. by Shin Amano	
2007–2008	Warsaw Concerto by Richard Addinsell choreo. by Doug Ladret, Grant Rorvick	Tosca by Giacomo Puccini choreo. by Doug Ladret, Grant Rorvick	Dream On by Aerosmith choreo. by Grant Rorvick
2006–2007	The Feeling Begins by Peter Gabriel choreo. by Doug Ladret	Warsaw Concerto by Richard Addinsell choreo. by Doug Ladret	
2005–2006	Kalinka by Ivan Larionov choreo. by Doug Ladret	Doctor Zhivago by Maurice Jarre choreo. by Doug Ladret	
2004–2005	Kalinka by Ivan Larionov choreo. by Doug Ladret	Tosca by Giacomo Puccini choreo. by Doug Ladret	

== Competitive highlights ==
- GP – Event of the ISU Grand Prix Series
- JGP – Event of the ISU Junior Grand Prix Series
- CS – Event of the ISU Challenger Series

Competition placements at senior level
Season	2007–08	2008–09	2009–10	2010–11	2011–12	2012–13	2013–14	2014–15
U.S. Championships	16th	14th	15th	10th	5th	12th	6th	7th
GP Skate America					7th	9th		8th
GP Trophée Éric Bompard								10th
CS Ice Challenge			8th	2nd		2nd		1st
CS U.S. Classic								4th
Challenge Cup							2nd	
Finlandia Trophy					2nd			

Competition placements at junior level
Season	2003–04	2004–05	2005–06	2006–07	2007–08
Junior Grand Prix Final					4th
U.S. Championships		4th	12th	5th	
JGP Czech Republic				7th	
JGP Estonia					4th
JGP Great Britain					2nd
JGP Slovakia			6th		
Triglav Trophy	1st				
