= Courtney Hicks =

American figure skater

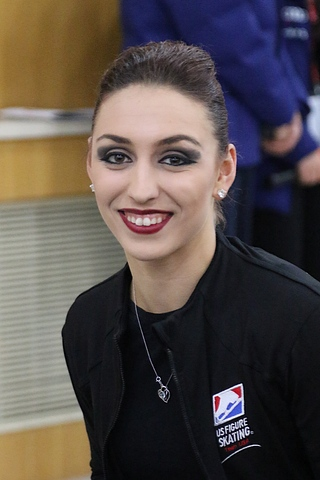
- Hicks in 2016

Personal information
- Full name: Courtney N. Hicks
- Born: December 15, 1995 (age 30) Placentia, California, U.S.
- Home town: Chino Hills, California, U.S.
- Height: 5 ft 3 in (1.61 m)

Figure skating career
- Country: United States
- Coach: Kori Ade
- Skating club: All Year Figure Skating Club
- Began skating: 2001

Courtney Hicks (born December 15, 1995) is an American figure skater. She has won two medals on the Grand Prix series—silver at the 2015 NHK Trophy and bronze at the 2016 Rostelecom Cup—and two medals on the ISU Challenger Series. She took gold at two other senior internationals, the 2013 Ice Challenge and U.S. Classic.

== Personal life ==
Courtney Hicks was born on December 15, 1995, in Placentia, California. The eldest of three girls, she is of Russian descent through her mother who has three Russian grandparents.

== Career ==
Hicks began skating in 2001. She placed 5th in the novice event at the 2010 U.S. Championships.

=== 2010–11 to 2012–13 ===
Hicks won the junior title at the 2011 U.S. Championships. She was selected to compete at the 2011 World Junior Championships, where she placed sixth in her international debut.

In the 2011–12 season, Hicks debuted on the Junior Grand Prix series, winning a gold medal at her first event in Brisbane, Australia. She sustained a season-ending injury while competing at her second JGP event, on October 8, 2011, in Milan, Italy. On the opening jump in the long program, a piece of bone detached from the tibia in her right leg. She underwent surgery on October 12. Hicks returned to the ice in December 2011 and resumed jumping in February 2012. She was coached mainly by John Nicks in Aliso Viejo, California, until April 2012 when her primary coach became Ken Congemi at the Toyota Sports Center in El Segundo, California.

Coached by Jere Michael and Alex Chang, Hicks won the pewter medal at the 2013 U.S. Championships and placed 5th at the 2013 World Junior Championships.

=== 2013–14 season to present ===
Hicks made her senior international debut in the 2013–14 season, winning gold at the 2013 U.S. International Figure Skating Classic ahead of Gracie Gold. Replacing 2010 Olympic champion Kim Yuna, she placed 6th at her first senior Grand Prix (GP) event, the 2013 Skate Canada International. Hicks won the 2013 Ice Challenge ahead of Miki Ando. After finishing 6th at the 2014 U.S. Championships, she was sent to the 2014 Four Continents, where she placed 5th.

In 2014–15, Hicks won silver at the U.S. Classic, a part of the newly inaugurated ISU Challenger Series (CS). She finished fourth at both of her GP assignments, the 2014 Skate Canada International and 2014 Trophee Eric Bompard, and 8th at the 2015 U.S. Championships.

In 2015–16, Hicks started her season with a bronze medal at the CS Nebelhorn Trophy. Competing on the GP series, she placed 6th at the 2015 Cup of China before winning her first GP medal, silver, at the 2015 NHK Trophy. She finished 9th at the 2016 U.S. Championships. Having decided to change coaches in March 2016, she spent several months working with the 87-year-old John Nicks, from whom she had previously taken lessons, before joining Todd Sand in early August.

In 2018–19, Hicks added a triple flip-triple loop combination to her short program and free skate. She finished 7th at the 2018 U.S. International Figure Skating Classic and finished 8th at the 2018 NHK Trophy. At the 2019 U.S. Championships, Hicks placed sixteenth. She was eighth the following season.

Hicks placed sixteenth at the 2020 ISP Points Challenge, a virtual competition. She did not compete at the Championship Series, another virtual competition used the qualifier for Nationals. In January 2021, she announced she had been struggling with a hip injury and had surgery to replace it. She said would be off the ice for a couple of months.

In June 2023, Hicks announced her plans to return to competition for the 2023–24 figure skating season.

== Programs ==
Season	Short program	Free skating	Exhibition
2023–2024	Daylight by David Kushner choreo. by Jordan Moeller	Seven Devils; Heaven Is Here; Choreomania; Cassandra by Florence + the Machine choreo. by Sonja Hilmer	
2018–2019	I Found by Amber Run	Pas de deux (from The Nutcracker) by Pyotr Ilyich Tchaikovsky	
2017–2018	Nocturne (from La califfa) by Ennio Morricone performed by Yo-Yo Ma choreo. by Rohene Ward	Amazing Grace by John Newton choreo. by Jonathan Cassar	
2016–2017	Maleficent by James Newton Howard choreo. by Rohene Ward	The Hunchback of Notre Dame by Alan Menken choreo. by Jonathan Cassar	Hello by Adele
2015–2016	The Feeling Begins by Peter Gabriel choreo. by Jonathan Cassar	Elizabeth: The Golden Age by Craig Armstrong and AR Rahman choreo. by Rohene Ward	Groove Is in the Heart by Deee-Lite; I See Fire by Ed Sheeran
2014–2015	Code Name Vivaldi by The Piano Guys	Anna Karenina by Dario Marianelli	
2013–2014	Angelica by Hans Zimmer; Soul Surfer by Marco Beltrami choreo. by Alex Chang	Evita by Andrew Lloyd Webber choreo. by Jonathan Cassar	Hope Will Lead Us On by BarlowGirl
2012–2013	Korobushka by Bond	Red Violin by Ikuko Kawai	
2011–2012	Raga's Dance by Vanessa-Mae	Russian Sailors' Dance; Adagio by Reinhold Glière performed by Andre Anichinov & St. Petersburg State Symphony Orchestra	
2010–2011	Dark Eyes performed by André Rieu	Malagueña by Ernesto Lecuona performed by 101 String Orchestra	Headphones by Britt Nicole
2008–2009	Happy Valley by Vanessa-Mae	Virtuoso by Edvin Marton	

== Competitive highlights ==
GP: Grand Prix; CS: Challenger Series; JGP: Junior Grand Prix

International
Event	10–11	11–12	12–13	13–14	14–15	15–16	16–17	17–18	18–19	19-20
Four Continents				5th						
GP Cup of China						6th	9th			
GP France					4th					
GP NHK Trophy						2nd			8th	
GP Rostelecom Cup							3rd			
GP Skate Canada				6th	4th			4th		
CS Autumn Classic								4th		
CS Finlandia							6th			
CS Nebelhorn						3rd				
CS U.S. Classic					2nd				7th	
CS Warsaw Cup								3rd		
Ice Challenge				1st						
Philadelphia								4th		
U.S. Classic				1st						
International: Junior
Junior Worlds	6th		5th							
JGP Australia		1st								
JGP Slovenia			4th							
JGP U.S.			2nd							
National
U.S. Champ.	1st J		4th	6th	8th	9th	12th	9th	16th	8th
TBD = Assigned; WD = Withdrew; Levels: V = Juvenile; I = Intermediate; N = Novice; J = Junior
