= Dimitra Korri =

Greek figure skater (born 1992)

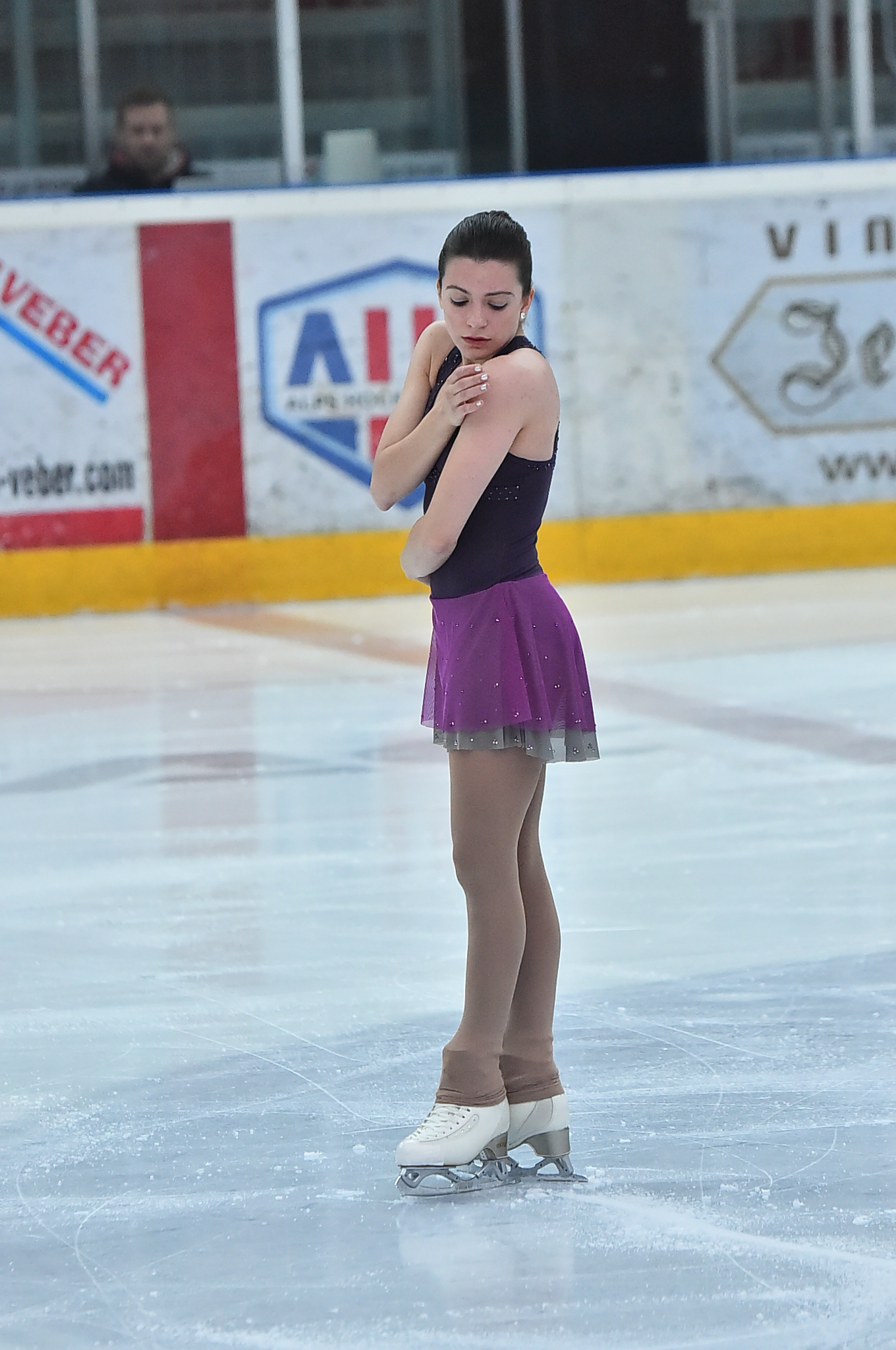
- Korri performs her freeskate at the 2018 Triglav Trophy

Personal information
- Born: July 17, 1992 (age 34) Chicago, Illinois, United States

Figure skating career
- Country: Greece
- Coach: Alex Chang
- Skating club: Tarandos Ice Sports Club Hellenic Winter Sports Federation
- Began skating: 1998

Dimitra Korri (born July 17, 1992) is a Greek-American figure skater who represents Greece in women's singles. She is a seven-time Greek national champion (2014, 2017-19, 2021-22, 2025). In addition, Korri was bronze medalist at the 2018 Balkan Games and at the 2021 edition of Skate Helena.

== Personal life ==
Korri went to school in the United States and spent her summers in Greece. She is fluent in Greek, English, and Spanish.

== Career ==
Korri began learning to skate in 1998. She has represented Greece internationally since the 2011–12 season. She finished in ninth place at the 2013 United States International Figure Skating Classic.

Korri achieved a national bronze medal from the 2012 Greek National Championships, and two national silver medals in 2011 and 2013, before winning her first gold medal in 2014.

In 2017, she won her second Greek National Championship, as well as a silver medal at the 29th Coppa Europa in Italy. In January 2018, she won the senior international silver medal at the EduSport Trophy in Romania. She finished 4th at the 2018 Triglav Trophy. In March 2018, she earned a bronze medal at the Balkan Games, becoming the first Greek female athlete to medal at the Balkan Games since 1989.

During the 2018 Greek National Figure Skating Championships, she achieved a score of 105.06, the highest ever recorded, before her third Greek National Championship.

== Programs ==
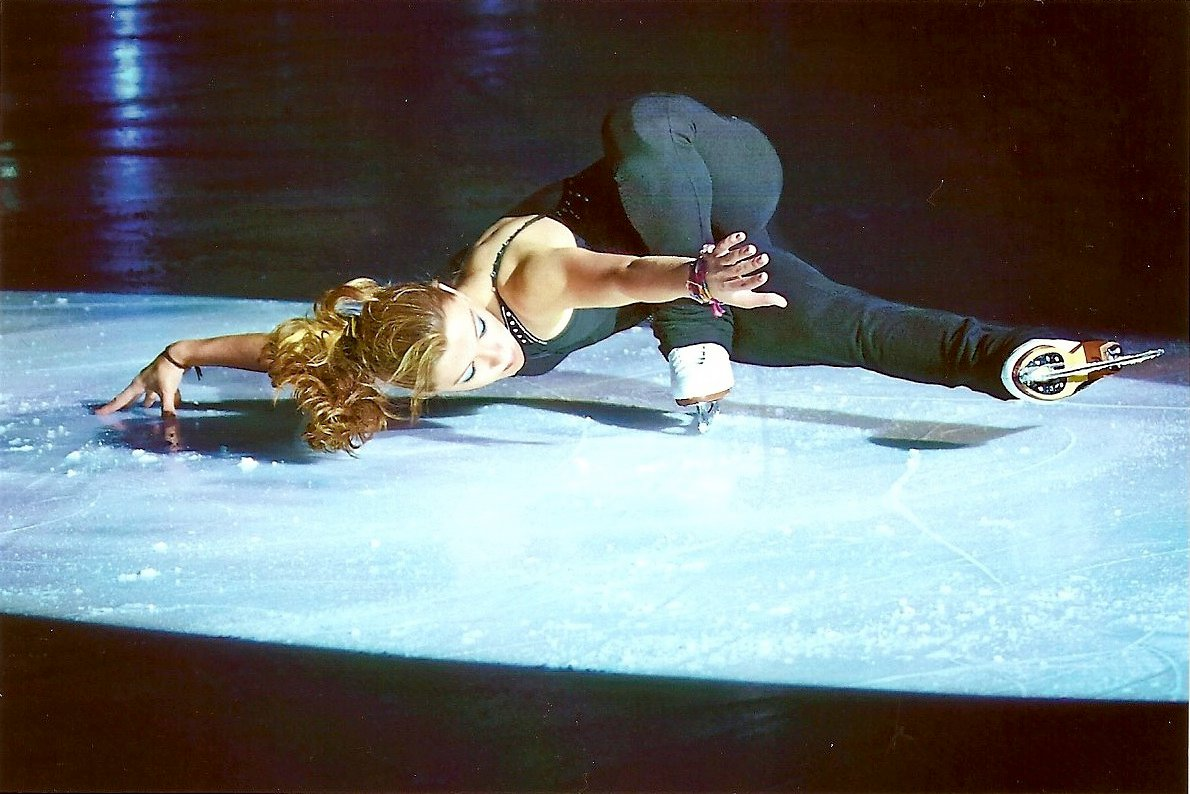
Korri performing a hydroblade.

Season	Short program	Free skating
2025–26	Sway by Luis Demetrio & Pablo Beltrán Ruiz performed by Michael Bublé; Spicy Margarita by Jason Derulo & Michael Bublé choreo. by Rohene Ward	Je suis malade by Alice Dona & Serge Lama performed by Lara Fabian choreo. by Rohene Ward
2024–25	I Put a Spell on You by Screamin' Jay Hawkins performed by Annie Lennox	Je suis malade by Alice Dona & Serge Lama performed by Lara Fabian choreo. by Rohene Ward
2023–24	Un-Break My Heart by Toni Braxton, David Foster, & Diane Warren	Ego ta Spao by Peggy Zina, Kyriakos Papadopoulos, & Vasilis Giannopoulos; Zeibekiko (To Zeibekiko Tis Evdokias) by Christos Nikolopoulos & Manos Loïzos
2021–22	Steppin' Out with My Baby by Irving Berlin & Fred Astaire performed by Tony Bennett; It Don't Mean a Thing (If It Ain't Got That Swing) by Duke Ellington performed by Tony Bennett & Lady Gaga choreo. by Rohene Ward, Massimo Scali, Misha Ge	Nothing Else Matters by Metallica choreo. by Rohene Ward, Massimo Scali, Misha Ge
2017–18	Touch by Daft Punk ft. Paul Williams; Lose Yourself to Dance by Daft Punk ft. Pharrell Williams choreo. by Rohene Ward, Massimo Scali, Misha Ge	D'Artagnan by Maxime Rodriguez choreo. by Rohene Ward, Massimo Scali
2014–15	Duende del amor by Ottmar Liebert & Luna Negra choreo. by Rohene Ward, Massimo Scali	D'Artagnan by Maxime Rodriguez choreo. by Rohene Ward, Massimo Scali

== Competitive highlights ==
- JGP – Event of the ISU Junior Grand Prix Series
- CS – Event of the ISU Challenger Series
- TBD – Assigned
- WD – Withdrew from competition

Competition placements at senior level
Season	2011–12	2012–13	2013–14	2014–15	2015–16	2016–17	2017–18	2018–19	2019–20	2020–21	2021–22	2022–23	2023–24	2024–25	2025–26
Greek Championships	2nd	3rd	1st			1st	1st	1st		1st	1st			1st	
CS Cranberry Cup															WD
CS Finlandia Trophy											WD				
CS Nebelhorn Trophy							31st				35th				
CS U.S. Classic						12th									
Balkan Games							3rd								
Crystal Skate								8th							
Denkova-Staviski Cup							15th		9th						
Dragon Trophy												16th			
EduSport Trophy							2nd					WD		11th	
FBMA Trophy						12th									
Istanbul Cup	11th														
Lõunakeskus Trophy														7th	
Mentor Toruń Cup			12th												
Mexico Cup												5th		WD	
Oceania													3rd		2nd
Open d'Andorra						8th			11th						
Philadelphia								10th							
Prague Ice Cup									15th						
Reykjavik Games								5th	7th						
Skate Helena						10th				3rd					
Skate to Milano															25th
Tayside Trophy													8th		
Triglav Trophy							4th								
U.S. Classic			9th												
Winter Universiade						28th									

Competition placements at junior level
Season	2011–12
JGP Romania	24th
