= Jordan Moeller =

American figure skater (born 1995)

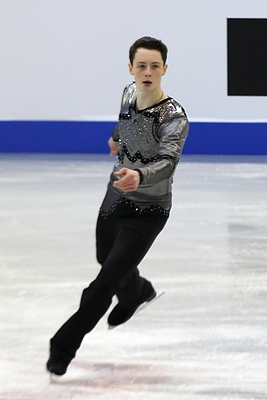
- Moeller at the 2014 World Junior Championships

Personal information
- Born: April 24, 1995 (age 31) Davenport, Iowa, U.S.
- Home town: Oak Lawn, Illinois, U.S.
- Height: 5 ft 10 in (1.79 m)

Figure skating career
- Country: United States
- Coach: Kori Ade
- Skating club: Northern ISC Woodridge
- Began skating: 1999

Jordan Moeller (born April 24, 1995) is an American figure skater. He is the 2017 International Challenge Cup silver medalist and finished in the top ten at the 2014 World Junior Championships.

== Personal life ==
Moeller was born on April 24, 1995, in Davenport, Iowa. After graduating from Harold L. Richards High School in Oak Lawn, Illinois, Moeller began taking classes at Moraine Valley Community College. He later enrolled at the University of Colorado Colorado Springs, studying psychology and criminal justice.

== Career ==
Moeller won the junior gold medal at the Gardena Spring Trophy in April 2013 and was one of the recipients of U.S. Figure Skating's Athlete Alumni Ambassador (3A) award the following month. After winning silver on the junior level at the 2014 U.S. Championships, he was selected for the 2014 World Junior Championships in Sofia, Bulgaria, where he placed ninth in both segments and overall.

While practicing a quad toe loop on December 22, 2015, Moeller fractured his fibula and tore a ligament in his right ankle; as a result, he withdrew from the 2016 U.S. Championships. He finished tenth at the 2017 U.S. Championships. In February 2017, he won his first senior international medal, silver at the International Challenge Cup in The Hague, Netherlands.

== Programs ==
Season	Short program	Free skating
2016–2017	We're So Far Away (from The Everglow) by Mae	Romeo + Juliet by Craig Armstrong; O Verona; Kissing You
2015–2016	The Allure by Beats Antique choreo. by Rohene Ward	Peer Gynt by Edvard Grieg choreo. by Rohene Ward
2014–2015	Wakare no Kyoku by Michiru Ōshima (based on Étude Op. 10, No. 3 (Chopin)) choreo. by Katherine Hill	Peer Gynt by Edvard Grieg choreo. by Rohene Ward
2013–2014	Crystallize by Lindsey Stirling	Milonga del Angel by Astor Piazzolla; Tanguera by Luis Bravo
2012–2013	A Day in the Life by The Beatles	Exogenesis: Symphony: Part 3 (Redemption) by Matt Bellamy
2011–2012	Singin' in the Rain by various artists	The Exogenesis Symphonies by Muse
2010–2011	Little Wing by Stevie Ray Vaughan	Piano Concerto No. 2 in C minor, Op. 18 by Sergei Rachmaninoff

== Competitive highlights ==
CS: Challenger Series; JGP: Junior Grand Prix

=== 2012–present ===
International
Event	12–13	13–14	14–15	15–16	16–17	17–18	18–19	19–20	20–21
CS Ice Challenge				7th					
CS Lombardia						10th			
CS U.S. Classic			7th						
Int. Challenge Cup					2nd				
Philadelphia Int.						10th			
International: Junior
Junior Worlds		9th							
JGP Latvia		9th							
JGP Poland		6th							
Gardena Trophy	1st								
National
U.S. Champ.	5th J	2nd J	13th	WD	10th	15th	13th	14th	15th
J = Junior level; WD = Withdrew

== Detailed results ==
Small medals for short and free programs awarded only at ISU Championships. At team events, medals awarded for team results only.

=== Senior career ===
2020–21 season
Date	Event	SP	FS	Total
January 11–21, 2021	2021 U.S. Championships	12; 71.09	15; 120.24	15; 191.33
2019–20 season
Date	Event	SP	FS	Total
January 20–26, 2020	2020 U.S. Championships	10; 71.87	14; 119.38	14; 191.25
2018–19 season
Date	Event	SP	FS	Total
January 19–27, 2019	2019 U.S. Championships	14; 66.15	12; 131.67	13; 197.82
2017–18 season
Date	Event	SP	FS	Total
Dec. 29 – Jan. 8, 2018	2018 U.S. Championships	20; 55.35	15; 124.86	15; 180.21
September 14–17, 2017	2017 CS Lombardia Trophy	7; 70.75	13; 120.98	10; 191.73
August 3–5, 2017	2017 Philadelphia Summer International	9; 61.63	10; 116.48	10; 178.11
2016–17 season
Date	Event	SP	FS	Total
23–26 February 2017	2017 Challenge Cup	2; 67.78	2; 131.42	2; 199.20
January 14–22, 2017	2017 U.S. Championships	8; 76.24	10; 149.61	10; 225.85
2015–16 season
Date	Event	SP	FS	Total
January 15–24, 2016	2016 U.S. Championships	WD	WD	WD
October 27–31, 2015	2015 Ice Challenge	7; 63.50	9; 114.71	7; 178.21
2014–15 season
Date	Event	SP	FS	Total
January 18–25, 2015	2015 U.S. Championships	14; 67.81	13; 138.19	13; 206.00
September 11–14, 2014	2014 U.S. Classic	7; 64.21	7; 125.60	7; 189.81

=== Junior level ===
2013–14 season
Date	Event	Level	SP	FS	Total
12–16 March 2014	2014 World Junior Championships	Junior	9; 66.38	9; 121.76	9; 188.14
20–22 September 2013	2013 JGP Poland	Junior	9; 51.06	4; 114.69	6; 165.75
29–30 August 2013	2013 JGP Latvia	Junior	12; 52.98	8; 105.76	9; 158.74
