= Jason Brown (figure skater) =

American figure skater (born 1994)

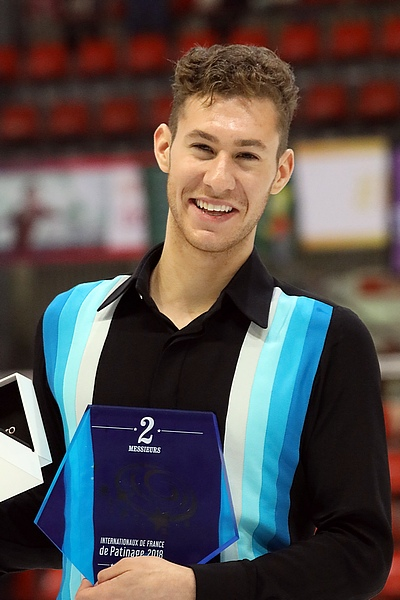
- Brown at the 2018 Internationaux de France

Personal information
- Full name: Jason Lawrence Brown
- Born: December 15, 1994 (age 31) Los Angeles, California, U.S.
- Home town: Highland Park, Illinois, U.S.
- Height: 5 ft 8 in (1.73 m)

Figure skating career
- Country: United States
- Discipline: Men's singles
- Coach: Rohene Ward
- Skating club: Skokie Valley Figure Skating Club
- Began skating: 1999
- Highest WS: 4th (2020–21)

Medal record
Event	Gold medal – first place	Silver medal – second place	Bronze medal – third place
Olympic Games	0	0	1
Four Continents Championships	0	1	1
U.S. Championships	1	4	3
World Team Trophy	3	1	1
World Junior Championships	0	1	1
Junior Grand Prix Final	1	0	0
Medal list
Olympic Games
Bronze medal – third place	2014 Sochi	Team
Four Continents Championships
Silver medal – second place	2020 Seoul	Singles
Bronze medal – third place	2018 Taipei	Singles
U.S. Championships
Gold medal – first place	2015 Greensboro	Singles
Silver medal – second place	2014 Boston	Singles
Silver medal – second place	2020 Greensboro	Singles
Silver medal – second place	2023 San Jose	Singles
Silver medal – second place	2024 Columbus	Singles
Bronze medal – third place	2017 Kansas City	Singles
Bronze medal – third place	2019 Detroit	Singles
Bronze medal – third place	2021 Las Vegas	Singles
World Team Trophy
Gold medal – first place	2015 Tokyo	Team
Gold medal – first place	2023 Tokyo	Team
Gold medal – first place	2025 Tokyo	Team
Silver medal – second place	2021 Osaka	Team
Bronze medal – third place	2017 Tokyo	Team
World Junior Championships
Silver medal – second place	2013 Milan	Singles
Bronze medal – third place	2012 Minsk	Singles
Junior Grand Prix Final
Gold medal – first place	2011–12 Quebec City	Singles

Jason Lawrence Brown (born December 15, 1994) is an American figure skater. He is a two-time Four Continents medalist (2020 silver, 2018 bronze), a nine-time Grand Prix medalist, a 13-time Challenger Series medalist, and the 2015 U.S. national champion. Earlier in his career, he became a two-time World Junior medalist (2013 silver, 2012 bronze), the 2011–12 Junior Grand Prix Final champion, and the 2010 junior national champion.

At only 19, Brown won a bronze medal in the team event at the 2014 Winter Olympics in Sochi, becoming one of the youngest male figure skating Olympic medalists.

== Personal life ==
Brown was born on December 15, 1994, in Los Angeles, California. His mother, Marla (Kell), is a television producer, and his father, Steven Brown, works for a lighting company. He has an older sister, Jordan, and a younger brother, Dylan. He is Jewish and celebrated his bar mitzvah in 2007.

Brown graduated from Highland Park High School and received the Ralph Potter Memorial Award for Exceptional Ability and Achievement and the President's Education Award for Outstanding Academic Excellence. In 2013, he enrolled at the University of Colorado Colorado Springs. He plays piano.

Brown can speak, read and write Japanese. He came out as gay via an Instagram post on June 11, 2021.

== Career ==
=== Early years ===
Brown began skating at age three and a half when his mother enrolled him and his sister in Learn to Skate classes. Coached by Kori Ade since the age of five, he trained at various rinks in the Chicago area until April 2013. Since 2009, his programs have been choreographed mainly by Rohene Ward. Brown also skated pairs with Thea Milburn for three years.

At 11, Brown won the national juvenile title. He won the bronze medal on the novice level at the 2009 U.S. Championships. Competing on the junior level at the 2010 U.S. Championships, he placed second in the short program, 0.07 behind Max Aaron, and second to Joshua Farris in the long program. Brown's overall score was the highest and he won the national junior title.

=== 2010–2011 season ===
Brown won the silver medal in his Junior Grand Prix debut in France and placed sixth in his second JGP event in Japan. He finished 9th in his senior national debut at the 2011 U.S. Championships with an impressive performance despite not attempting a triple Axel, which he had decided to put off due to a growth spurt. He was assigned to compete at the 2011 World Junior Championships, where he finished 7th. Brown worked on the triple Axel for the following season while adapting to another growth spurt.

=== 2011–2012 season: World Junior bronze & Junior Grand Prix Final gold ===
Brown began his season with a win at his first Junior Grand Prix event in Brisbane, Australia. He then took silver in Milan, Italy, to qualify for the final. In a December 2011 interview, Brown said that he needed the triple Axel to be competitive on the senior level and continued to work on it. He occasionally used Dartfish, a computer imaging system, and a harness. At the Junior Grand Prix Final, Brown was second in both segments and won the gold medal overall. Brown was assigned to the 2012 World Junior Championships and won the bronze medal.

=== 2012–2013 season: World Junior silver ===
Brown won gold and silver medals on the JGP series and qualified for his second JGP Final, where he finished fourth. He placed eighth at the 2013 U.S. Figure Skating Championships. He was sent to the 2013 World Junior Championships, where he placed third in the short program and first in the free skate after landing two triple Axels for the first time in his career. Brown won the silver medal while fellow Americans Joshua Farris and Shotaro Omori took the gold and bronze medals, respectively.

=== 2013–2014 season: Olympics team bronze & first Grand Prix medal ===
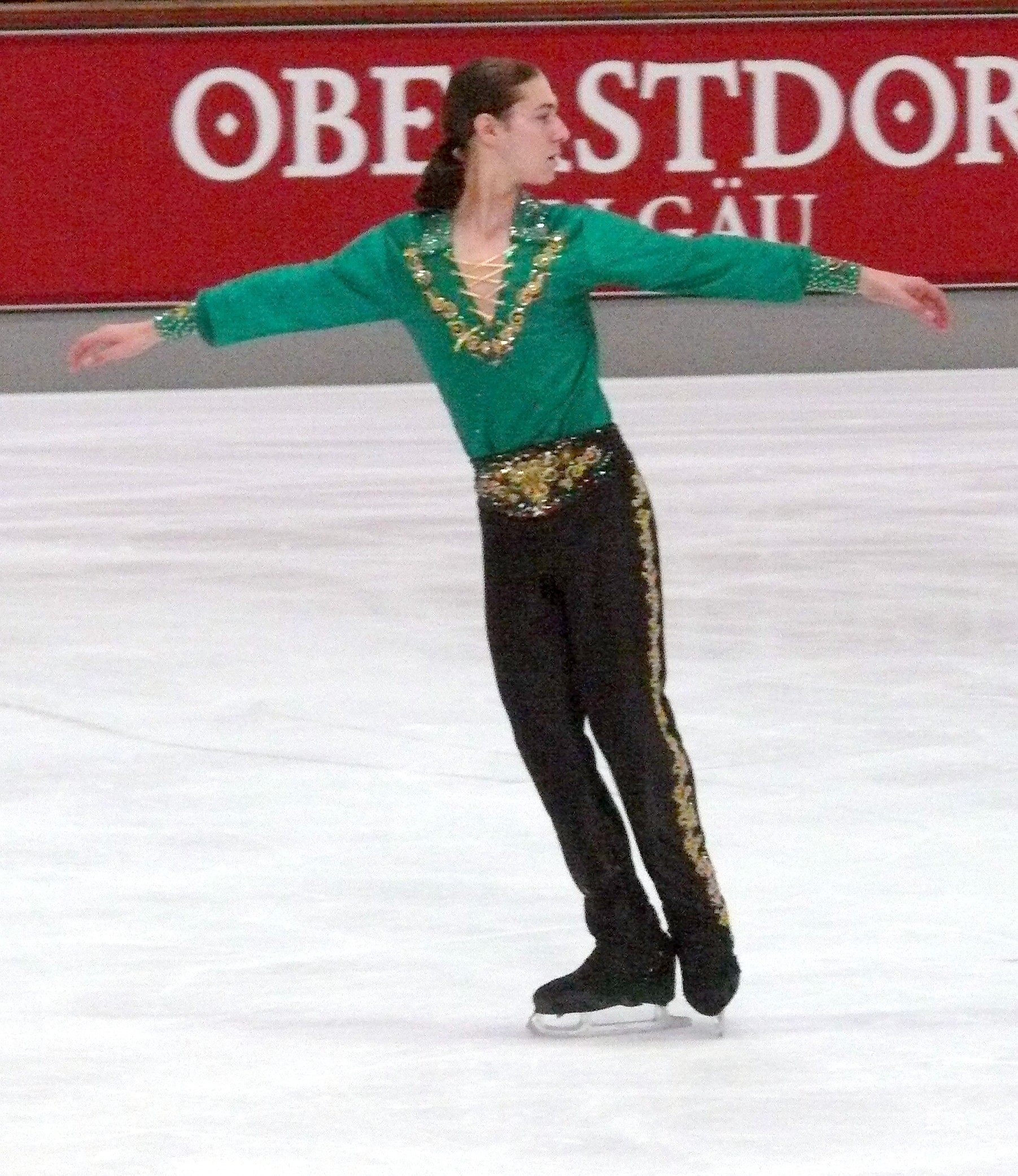
Brown at the 2013 Nebelhorn Trophy

In May 2013, Brown and his coach, Kori Ade, moved to the Colorado Sports Center in Monument, Colorado. His secondary coaches included Eddie Shipstad and Ryan Jahnke.

Brown won the silver medal in his senior international debut at the 2013 Nebelhorn Trophy in Oberstdorf, Germany. On September 30, 2013, he was called up to replace Evan Lysacek at Skate America after the latter withdrew due to injury. Brown finished fifth at the event, his first senior Grand Prix event. In November 2013, he competed at a Grand Prix event in Paris, the 2013 Trophée Éric Bompard, and won the bronze medal. He also attracted much attention from the skating public and the French in particular, becoming a crowd favorite.

At the U.S. Championships in January 2014, Brown placed third in the short program and first in the free skate with his Riverdance program, which became a viral video garnering more than 4 million hits. He won the silver medal and was named in the U.S. team to the 2014 Winter Olympics in Sochi, Russia. In Sochi, while Jeremy Abbott skated the short program in the team event, Brown was assigned to the free program and placed fourth. He and team USA were awarded the bronze medal. In the singles event, he was in sixth place after the short program but less than a point off third. He placed eleventh in the free skate and finished ninth overall. At the end of the season, he performed in twelve Stars on Ice shows before returning to training.

=== 2014–2015 season: Second Grand Prix medal ===
Brown began the 2014–15 season at the 2014 Nebelhorn Trophy, an ISU Challenger Series event, and won the gold medal after placing first in both programs. At 2014 Skate America, he came in second. He placed fifth at 2014 Rostelecom Cup with a personal best in the free skate of 159.24 points. His placements earned him 7th place in the Grand Prix series, just missing the cut for the final.

At the 2015 U.S. Championships, Brown won the short program with the second-highest points in the U.S. Championships' history. He finished the free skating second and won his first U.S. title. Until then, he had not tried a quad jump in competition. At the 2015 Four Continents Championships, he tried a quad jump in the short program, placing ninth. In the free skate, he set his personal best and finished sixth overall.

Brown placed fourth overall at the 2015 World Figure Skating Championships, placing sixth in the short program and fifth in the free skate. At the 2015 ISU World Team Trophy, he placed second overall to contribute to Team USA's gold medal.

=== 2015–2016 season: Third Grand Prix medal ===
Brown began his season by winning the gold medal at 2015 Ondrej Nepela Trophy. At his first Grand Prix event of the season, 2015 Skate America, he won the bronze medal after placing eighth in the short program and third in the free skate. He then won the silver medal at 2015 CS Ice Challenge. Brown withdrew from the 2015 NHK Trophy due to a back injury. He returned to the ice two weeks later, but the injury resurfaced and forced him to withdraw from the 2016 U.S. Championships. On January 22, NBC Sports reported that he had petitioned U.S. Figure Skating for a spot on the world team despite his inability to compete at the national championships. His petition cited his world ranking, international experience, and competitive record. The USFSA denied his petition and named Adam Rippon, Max Aaron, and Nathan Chen, whom Grant Hochstein later replaced due to injury.

Brown ended his season at the 2016 Team Challenge Cup. He placed second in the third short program group and second in the free skate.

=== 2016–2017 season: Fourth consecutive Grand Prix medal ===
Brown began his season at 2016 Lombardia Trophy, where he won the silver medal after placing second in the short program and first in the free skate. At the 2016 U.S. International Classic, he won the gold medal after placing second in the short program and first in the free skate.

Brown placed third in the short program at the 2016 Skate America. During the free skate, he performed a quad toe loop which was deemed underrotated by the technical panel. He finished second in the free skate, earning the silver medal behind Shoma Uno. He placed eighth in the short program and seventh in the free skate to place seventh overall at the 2016 NHK Trophy.

On December 16, 2016, Brown was diagnosed with a stress fracture in his right fibula. He received the bronze medal at the 2017 U.S. Championships.

He placed sixth overall at the 2017 Four Continents Championships after placing ninth in the short program and sixth in the free skate. At the 2017 World Championships, he placed seventh overall after placing eighth in the short program and seventh in the free skate.

At 2017 World Team Trophy, Brown placed 6th overall to contribute to Team USA's bronze medal.

=== 2017–2018 season: Four Continents bronze & Grand Prix medal ===
Brown began his season by winning the silver medal at 2017 Lombardia Trophy.

Brown won silver at the 2017 Skate Canada International after placing third in the short program and second in the free skate. At the 2017 NHK Trophy, he ranked third in the short program but ended the competition in fourth place. As a result, he finished as the first alternate for the Grand Prix Final. Although he had tied with Jin Boyang at 22 points, Jin won the tiebreaker by scoring 3.34 points higher than Brown. After Jin's withdrawal, Brown was called up to compete at his first senior-level Grand Prix Final. He finished 6th at the event in Nagoya, Japan.

In January, Brown finished sixth at the 2018 U.S. Championships after placing third in the short program and sixth in the free skate. U.S. Figure Skating named him as first alternate for the 2018 Winter Olympics. He was assigned to the 2018 Four Continents Championships in Taipei, Taiwan. Ranked fourth in the short and third in the free, he won the bronze medal, achieving his first podium finish at a senior-level ISU Championship.

In late May 2018, Brown announced his decision to leave his coaching team in Colorado and move to Brian Orser, Tracy Wilson, Karen Preston, and Lee Barkell at the Toronto Cricket, Skating and Curling Club in Toronto, Canada. Brown and Orser stated that Kori Ade would remain an influence on Brown's career.

=== 2018–2019 season: Sixth consecutive Grand Prix medal ===
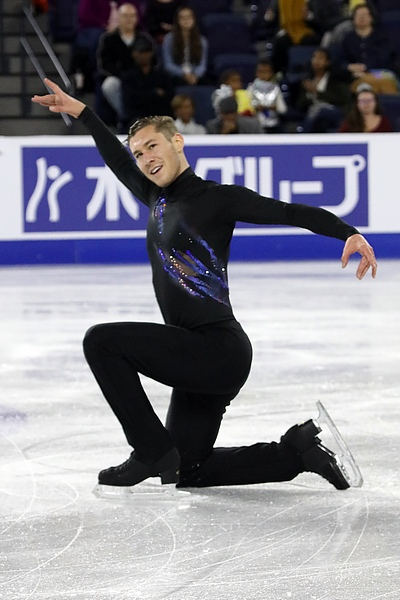
Brown performing his short program at 2018 Skate Canada International

At his first event of the season, the 2018 CS Autumn Classic International, Brown placed third in the short program, fifth in the free program, and fourth overall. He placed eleventh in the short program at 2018 Skate Canada International after underrotating and falling on his triple Axel and underrotating his triple Lutz-double toe loop combination. He fared better in the free skate, where he placed sixth, moving to sixth place overall. At the 2018 Internationaux de France, he placed second overall after winning the short program with a then-personal best score of 96.41 and placed third in the free program. Competing at a second Challenger event, the 2018 CS Golden Spin, he won the gold medal after placing second in the short program and first in the free skate.

At the 2019 US Championships, he won the bronze medal after placing second in the short program and third in the free skate.

At the 2019 Four Continents Championships, Brown placed sixth in the short program and moved up to fifth overall after placing fourth in the free program. In his free skate, Brown avoided popping his opening quad Salchow for the first time that season, though it was deemed underrotated, and he stepped out of the landing.

At the 2019 World Championships, he placed second in the short program, with a new personal best score of 96.81, winning a silver small medal. He placed fourteenth in the free skate after a poor skate and placed ninth overall at the event. He expressed satisfaction with his season overall.

=== 2019–2020 season: Four Continents silver & Grand Prix medal ===
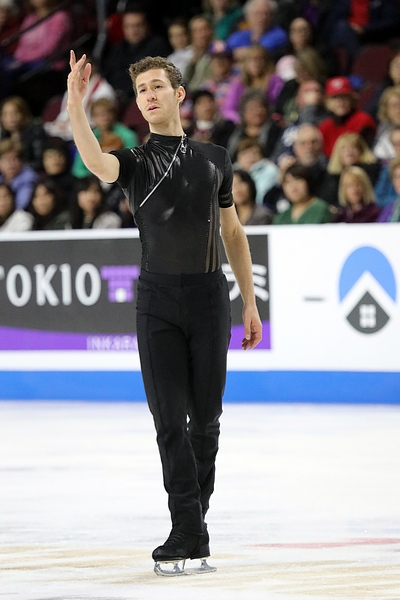
Brown performing his short program at 2019 Skate America

While traveling to a U.S. Figure Skating training camp in August 2019, the car Brown was traveling in was impacted by another vehicle, as a result of which Brown sustained a concussion. Restricted from training, Brown withdrew from the 2019 CS Nebelhorn Trophy. He was cleared to compete at 2019 Skate America, his first Grand Prix of the season. Brown popped his planned triple Axel to a single in the short program, placing fourth in that segment. In the free skate, Brown performed all his jumps successfully other than doubling a planned triple loop, placing second in that segment to take the silver medal. At the 2019 NHK Trophy, Brown placed eighth in the short program and fourth in the free skate to place fifth overall. Two weeks later, he won the gold medal at 2019 CS Golden Spin of Zagreb.

Brown won the silver medal at the 2020 U.S. Championships after placing second in both segments. In the free skate, he attempted a quad toe loop, which was downgraded but landed without program interruption.

At the 2020 Four Continents Championships, Brown placed third in the short program with a clean skate, defeating several skaters who performed at least one quadruple jump. In the free skate, Brown doubled an attempted quad toe loop but landed all his other jumps successfully and placed second in the segment with a new personal best of 180.11, moving into second place overall. He was assigned to compete at the World Championships in Montreal, Canada, but it was cancelled as a result of the coronavirus pandemic.

=== 2020–2021 season ===
Brown was assigned to compete at the 2020 Skate Canada International, but the event was also canceled due to the pandemic.

As a result, Brown made his season debut at the 2021 U.S. Championships in Las Vegas, placing third in the short program with a clean skate. In the free skate, he fell on a quad toe loop that was also deemed underrotated and singled a planned triple Axel, placing fourth in that segment, but remained in third place overall and won the bronze medal. He was named to the American team for the 2021 World Championships in Stockholm, Sweden.

Brown placed seventh in the short program at the World Championships with a clean skate. Brown attempted a quad Salchow in the free skate, but it was deemed underrotated. Making one other minor jump error, he placed eighth in that segment and remained seventh overall. Brown and Nathan Chen's placements at the World Championships were sufficient to qualify at least two berths for American men at the 2022 Winter Olympics, but only the possibility of a third because Vincent Zhou failed to qualify for the free skate.

Brown competed at the 2021 World Team Trophy, where he served as team captain and helped Team USA win the silver medal. He placed third in the short program and eighth in the free skate, with his total score ranking sixth among the men.

=== 2021–2022 season: Two Grand Prix medals ===
Brown made his season debut at the 2021 CS Finlandia Trophy, winning the gold medal. Returning to the Grand Prix, he took the silver medal at the 2021 Skate Canada International to start. He said he was "a little disappointed" with the free skate after two jump errors but overall was satisfied with his result. Brown went on to place third in the short program and fourth in the free skate at the 2021 Internationaux de France, winning the bronze medal and thus medaling at both of his Grand Prix events for the first time in his career. Attempting a quad Salchow in the free skate, he two-footed the landing but was credited with full rotation for the first time. Brown's results qualified him to the Grand Prix Final, but it was subsequently canceled due to restrictions prompted by the Omicron variant.

Traveling to attend the 2022 U.S. Championships with coach Tracy Wilson proved to be an odyssey for Brown due to five different flight cancellations that had him in transit for thirty-three hours, culminating in a rental car trip from Atlanta to Nashville. Despite this, he skated a clean short program and placed fourth in that segment, narrowly behind third-place Ilia Malinin. On the morning of the free skate, Wilson tested positive for COVID and could not accompany him to the event; Brown tested negative the same day. In the free skate, he fell on his opening quad Salchow attempt but landed the rest of his jumps. Normally regarded as one of the best spinners in the world, on one of his three free skate spins, he lost two levels, which made the difference between third and fourth overall as he finished 0.38 points behind bronze medalist Vincent Zhou. Per the selection criteria for the American Olympic team, Zhou and national champion Nathan Chen were guaranteed berths, with the third to be decided between Brown and 17-year-old surprise silver medalist Ilia Malinin. The committee ultimately chose Brown. On Malinin, he said, "there's nothing I can say that can encompass how he might be feeling at this moment. What I can say is he is beyond out of this world, and U.S. figure skating is so lucky to have such a bright future with Ilia." For his part, Brown said that it had been "a really tough go to get here. Not just in the last 72 hours, but in the last four years and everything leading up to this point and me kind of turning a page after 2018."

Competing at the 2022 Winter Olympics in the men's event, Brown skated a clean short program and placed sixth with a new personal best score of 97.24. He said it was "a long time coming," noting that it had taken "eight years trying to get back to this stage to be able to put out a performance like that." In the free skate, he elected not to attempt a quadruple jump and skated a nearly clean program, with the lone error being a doubled attempt at a triple Salchow. He finished sixth in that segment as well, remaining sixth overall.

=== 2022–2023 season ===
Brown, by his own later admission, had not intended to compete further following the Olympic season, and moved out of his longtime Toronto apartment to relocate back to the United States. However, after accepting an invitation to compete at the Japan Open in the fall, he prepared a new free skate to "The Impossible Dream" from Man of La Mancha. He placed fifth at the Japan Open, and found his competitive drive reawakened by the experience, at which point he decided to return for the second half of the season starting with the national championships.

At the 2023 U.S. Championships in San Jose, Brown placed second in the short program, 10.11 points behind favorite Ilia Malinin. He was third in the free skate, fractionally behind Andrew Torgashev and Malinin, but won the silver medal. Brown said that he felt he had faced down "demons" by competing successfully in San Jose, the site of his failure to qualify for the 2018 Olympic team that he personally considered the low point of his career.

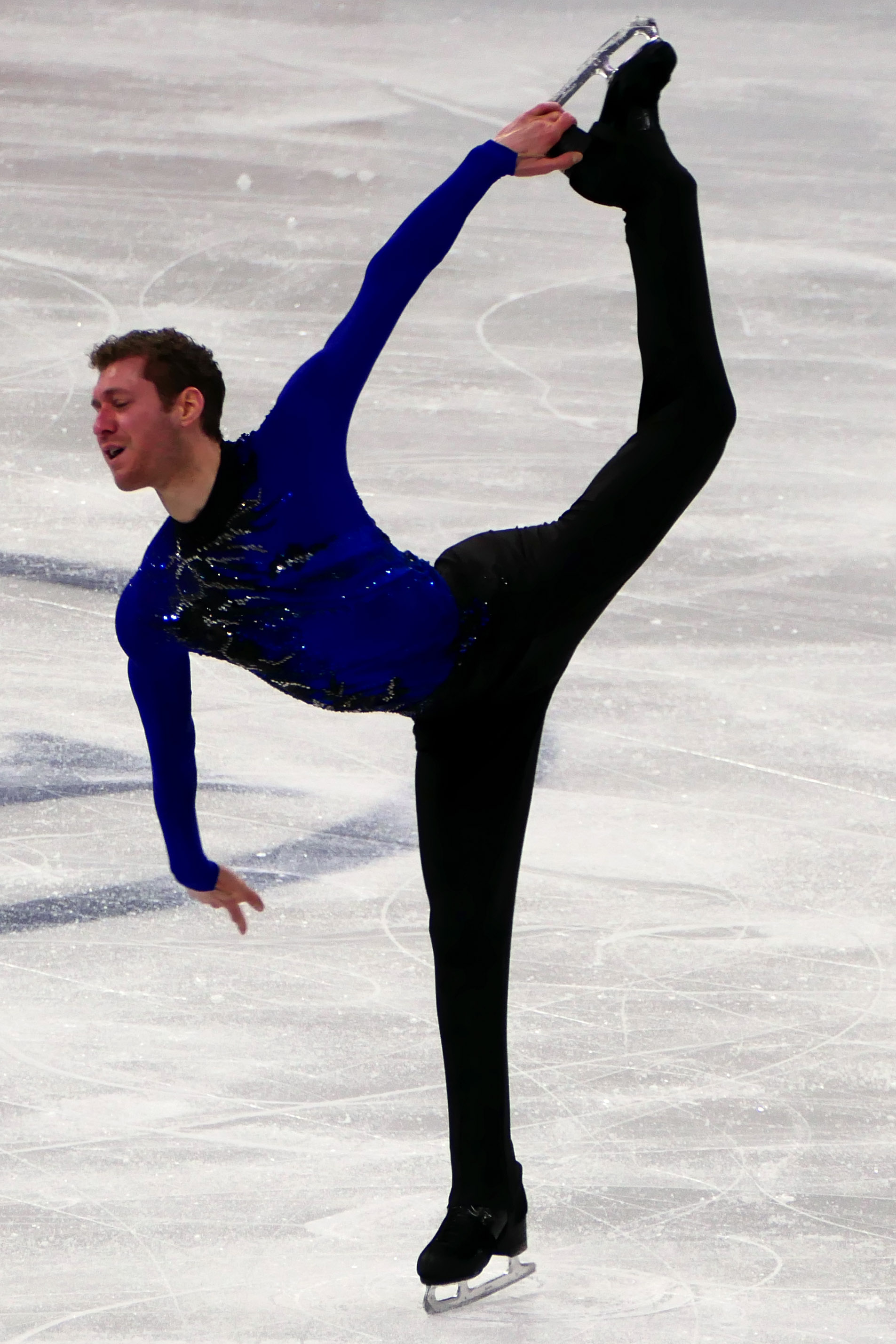
Brown performing his signature Catch-foot camel spin during his free skate at the 2024 World Championships

Brown finished sixth in the short program at the 2023 World Championships in Saitama. A clean free skate saw him earn a personal best 185.87 score, coming fifth in that segment and rising to fifth place overall. He described himself as "really touched" to be there, as he had not anticipated it at the start of the year. He remained in Japan for Stars on Ice shows in advance of the 2023 World Team Trophy. Brown captained Team USA at the World Team Trophy, coming fourth in the short program and third in the free skate, while the team won the gold medal. It was his second championship at the event.

=== 2023–2024 season ===
Brown again began his season at the Japan Open, coming fifth in the men's segment while Team North America won the silver medal. In November, he won the bronze medal at the 2023 Warsaw Cup. Although he found success in the previous season with a reduced training schedule and more time spent performing in ice shows, he found it more difficult to do so while competing with two new programs, and he decided to return to his previous season's free skate for the 2024 U.S. Championships.

At the U.S. Championships, Brown fell on his opening triple Axel in the short program. He was third after the short program. In the free skate, he put a hand down on one jump but moved up to second place overall. “At this point in my career, I was really focused on the performances,” he said after the free skate. “I did not know the scores going into it. I don’t know the scores going out of it." Brown was named to the American team for the 2024 World Championships, where he finished fifth for a second consecutive season. He received the highest component scores of any skater in the free program.

=== 2024–2025 season ===
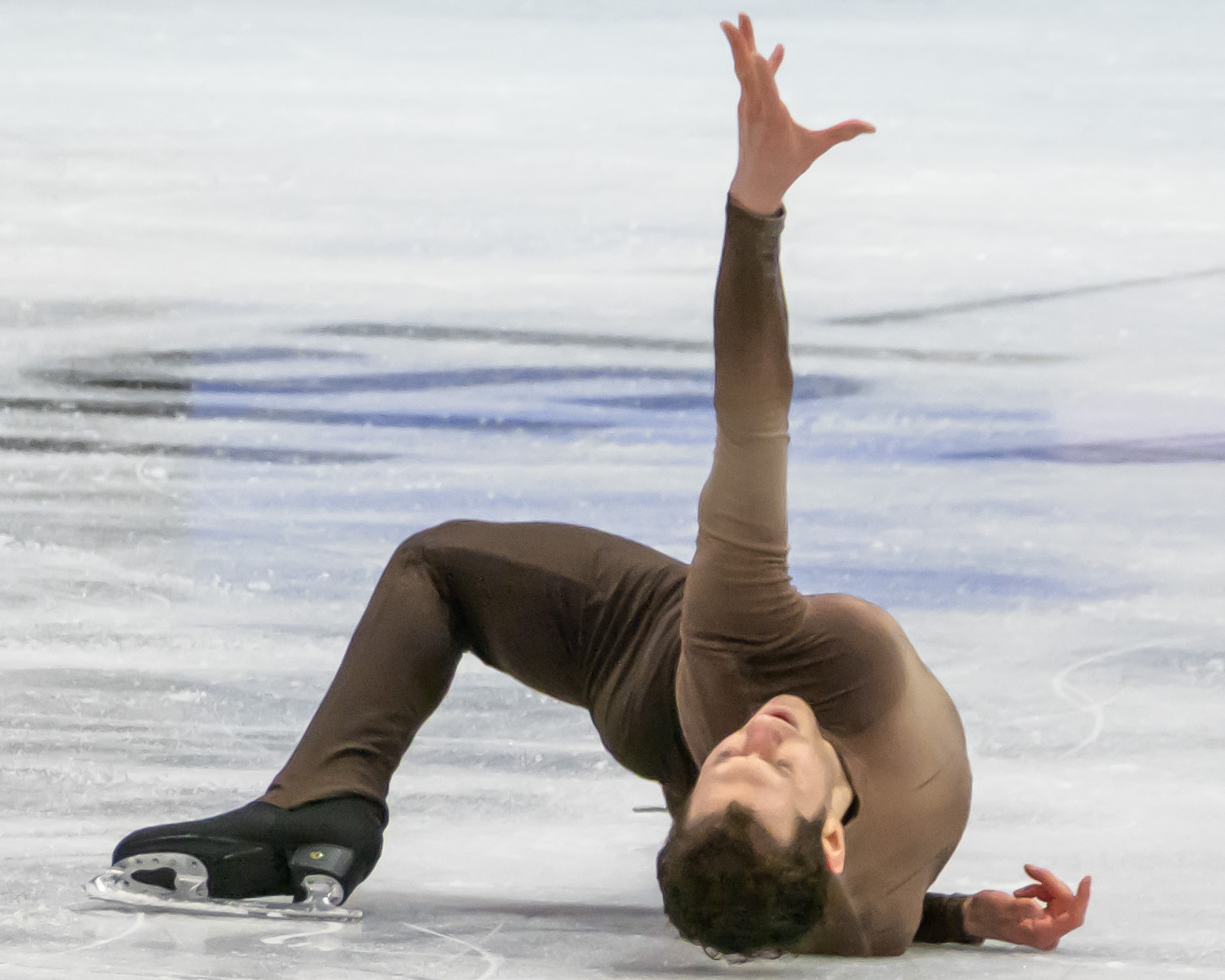
Brown finishing his short program at 2025 World Championships

Brown struggled with boot fit issues and hip pain. He started the season by competing at the 2024 Shanghai Trophy where he took the bronze medal.

Going on to compete on the Grand Prix circuit for the first time in three years, Brown finished eighth at 2024 Skate Canada International after struggling through both of his programs. Despite this placement, Brown expressed happiness over making a return to the Grand Prix, saying, "It’s a starting point, not the starting point I would have loved, but I feel like, hey, only up from here. I learned a ton. My coaches and I have talked through this whole week as we’ve gone, taking notes as we go... You know, there are things that I’m really proud of this week and things I’m disappointed on, which you can probably see, but overall, I’m really excited to take what I learned and apply it to NHK." He delivered stronger performances at the 2024 NHK Trophy, where he finished in seventh place.

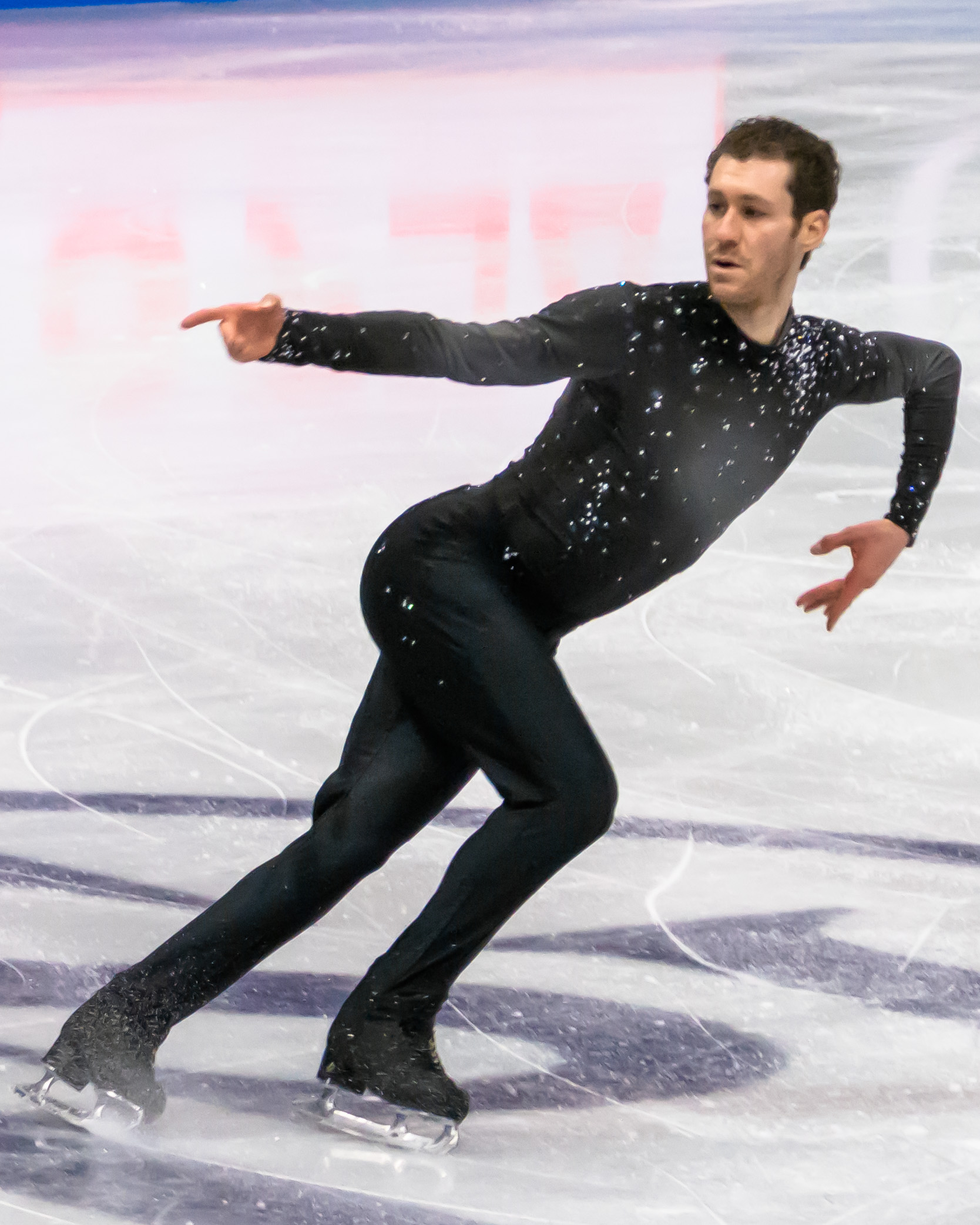
Brown at the 2025 World Championships

Brown withdrew from the 2025 U.S. Figure Skating Championships, citing ongoing issues with the adjustment of his equipment and its impact on training. He was named to the 2025 World Championships team, pending Return to Play protocol, which he completed in early March.

At the 2025 World Championships in Boston, Massachusetts, United States, Brown placed twelfth in the short program after his triple Axel was deemed as landed on the quarter and popping the second part of his planned triple Lutz-triple toe combination into a double. He rallied back with a strong free skate, however, placing fourth in that segment and finishing eighth overall. His placement, in addition to Ilia Malinin's first place finish, secured three berths for U.S. men's singles skating at the 2026 Winter Olympics. After the free skate, he said: “With the judging system, I’m doing my best to work the system to play to my strengths, maximize the point system. The crowd is so special and so loud. The leader’s chair was very cool and nerve racking…but also a strange sense of calm. Honestly, for me, it was cool because I never get to watch the events. I get way too nervous to watch anyone before the competition, my teammates and other disciplines. It was cool to sit in the arena and watch.”

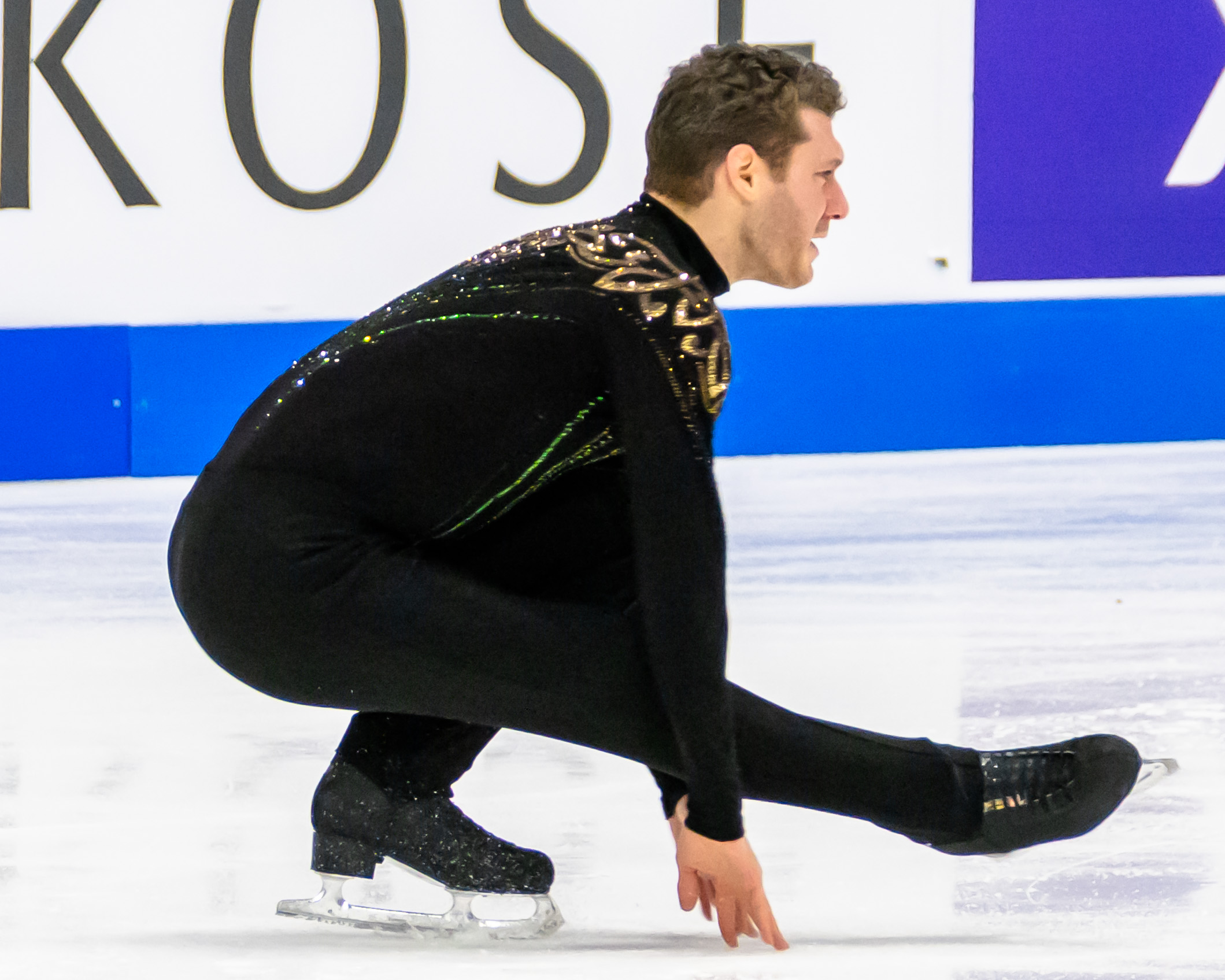
Brown performing a sit spin during his short program at 2025 Skate America

Selected to compete for Team United States at the 2025 World Team Trophy, Brown placed second behind Malinin in the men's singles event, aiding Team United States in securing the gold medal overall. Brown said of his experience, "This event is just so much fun! I think we just all enjoyed so much, the atmosphere, getting to be in the boxes, cheering each other on. We want to go out there and just celebrate the end of the season. But at the end of the day, it is still a competition and we all really, really want to do well for our team and represent our country the very best that we can. I’m really, really proud of my teammates for doing just that today."

=== 2025–2026 season ===
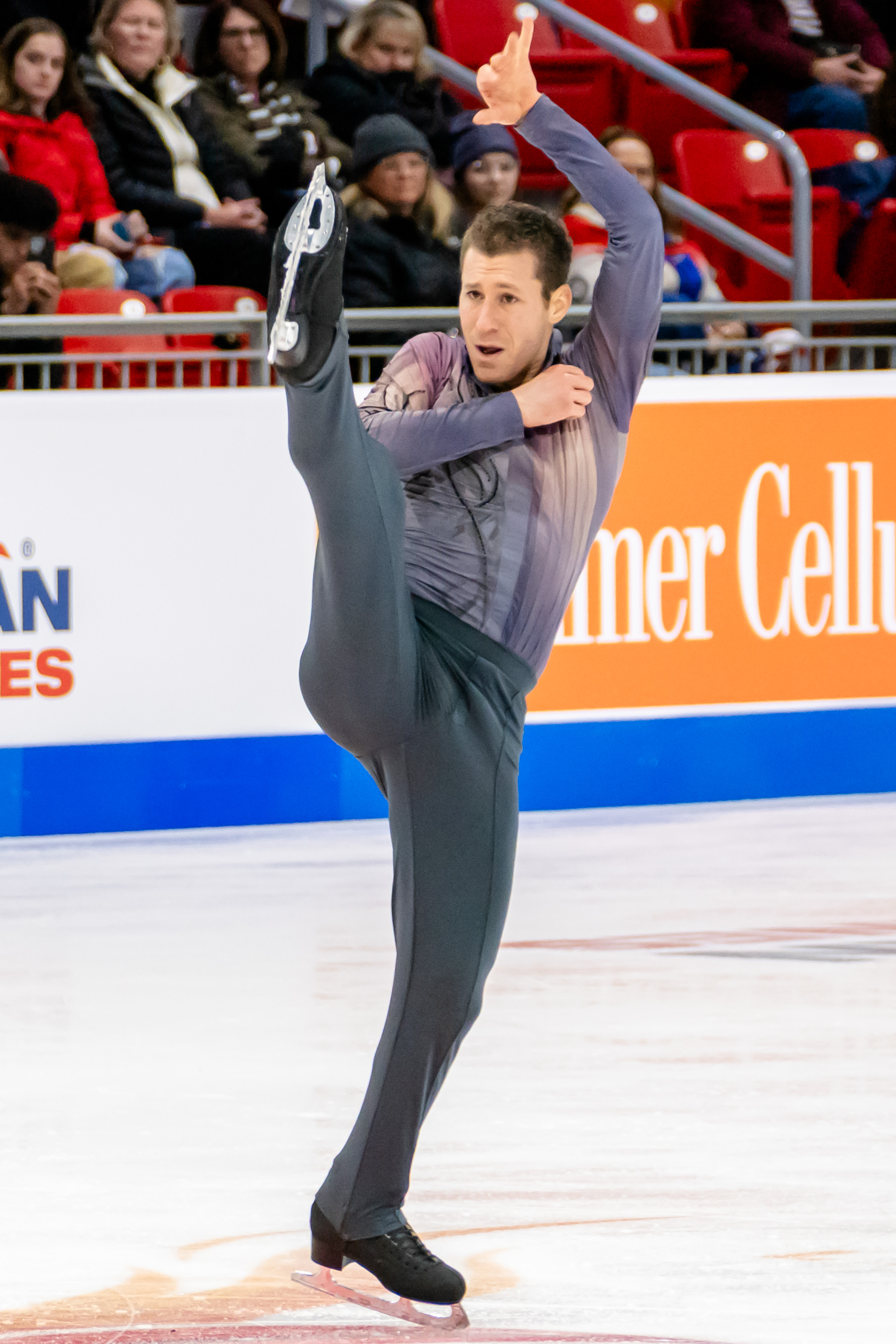
Brown performing his free skate at 2025 Skate America

For his short program, Brown returned to his well-known free skate from the 2013–2014 season with music from Riverdance, which he said was a "thank you" to his long-term fans for their support. The choreography was reworked by the original choreographer, Rohene Ward. For his free skate, he chose the song "Say Something", which he said symbolized his struggle to find a path for himself in figure skating without the quadruple jumps now expected for male competitors, noting that he was told as a junior skater, "Without a triple axel, you're not going to ever make it to the junior Grand Prix Final," and as a senior skater, "You're never going to make an Olympic team without a quad." He went on to accomplish both of these feats.

Brown began the season in October at the 2025 CS Denis Ten Memorial Challenge, where he won bronze. The following week, he took silver at 2025 CS Trialeti Trophy, for a total of 13 ISU Challenger Series medals to date.

The following month, he competed at 2025 Skate America, where he finished fourth. "I’m proud of my grit, I’m proud of the tenacity of the program,” said Brown after the free skate. “I’m really looking forward to giving it another go next week."

Brown competed the week after at the 2025 Finlandia Trophy. He was fourth in the short program but fell to fifth overall after the free skate, where two of his jumps were deemed under-rotated and he fell on his opening combination.

In January, Brown competed at the 2026 U.S. Championships. Despite stepping out of two jumps during the short program, Brown placed third in that segment. During the free skate, Brown performed an error-ridden free skate that included two falls and three popped jumps. As a result, Brown only placed twelfth in that competition segment and dropped to eighth place overall. Following his disastrous free skate, Brown shared, "That's a brutal one, that hurts. It hurts my soul. You know, at the same time, though, I'm just so unbelievably proud of the career that I've had and every time I get to step on the ice, I learn something new about myself. I learn about courage. I learn about how to fight harder. I learn about determination, getting back up every time I make those mistakes. This program, gosh, I had to fight so hard out there. Frustrating, really frustrating. But, you know, I'm gonna learn so much from it, and I'm gonna talk to my coaches and my psychologist and just really talk it through. But with that being said, I'm just so unbelievably proud of the work that I put in this year and this season, and I'm so unbelievably proud of my tenacity throughout my career." Due to this, Brown was not named to the 2026 Winter Olympic team but was named to the 2026 Four Continents and 2026 World Championship teams.

Afterward, Brown began to have panic attacks. He opted to withdraw from the Four Continents Championships. A few days before the World Championships were to begin, he withdrew from that competition as well due to the severity of his panic attacks. Jacob Sanchez was called up to compete. Brown later described the season as one where "things were not quite right" and he struggled with burnout.

=== 2026–2027 season ===
Brown moved back to Chicago, noting that while he enjoyed working with Brian Orser and Tracy Wilson, he wanted to return home and be closer to his family. He began to be coached by his main choreographer, Rohene Ward. He had a strained calf muscle during the summer, which kept him jumping for two months.

In November, Brown competed at 2026 Skate America, where he finished fourth. After the free skate, during which he performed to "Over the Rainbow", he said, "For me this felt like this cloud moving, and the sun shining through, and the rainbow taking shape, and that’s really how this program felt. And was it perfect? By no means, but I kept going forward. I kept resetting every time I had those bobbles, and I just said, 'Keep staying present. Keep resetting, and put your best foot forward.' And I’m just so proud of my fight."

== Skating technique and style ==
While Brown has struggled with the quadruple jumps expected from male figure skaters, and it took him more than three years to learn the triple Axel as a junior skater, he is known for his expressive performance ability, musical interpretation, fluid skating and footwork, and high-quality spins. He benefited from the change to the scoring system from grading execution on a -3 to +3 system to a -5 to +5 scale beginning in the 2018–19 season, which allowed him to receive more points for well-executed triple jumps as well as for his step sequences and spins, and his program component scores are typically among the highest of the men's competition. Brown has said that he wants to be an example of how competitors can be successful in the sport without being able to perform its hardest jumps.

Brown has skated to a wide range of musical genres during his career, and many of his programs were created by long-time collaborator Rohene Ward. They often make use of Brown's flexibility, which gives him a larger range of movement than many other men's skaters. His programs have been praised for their fluid transitions between elements.

== Programs ==
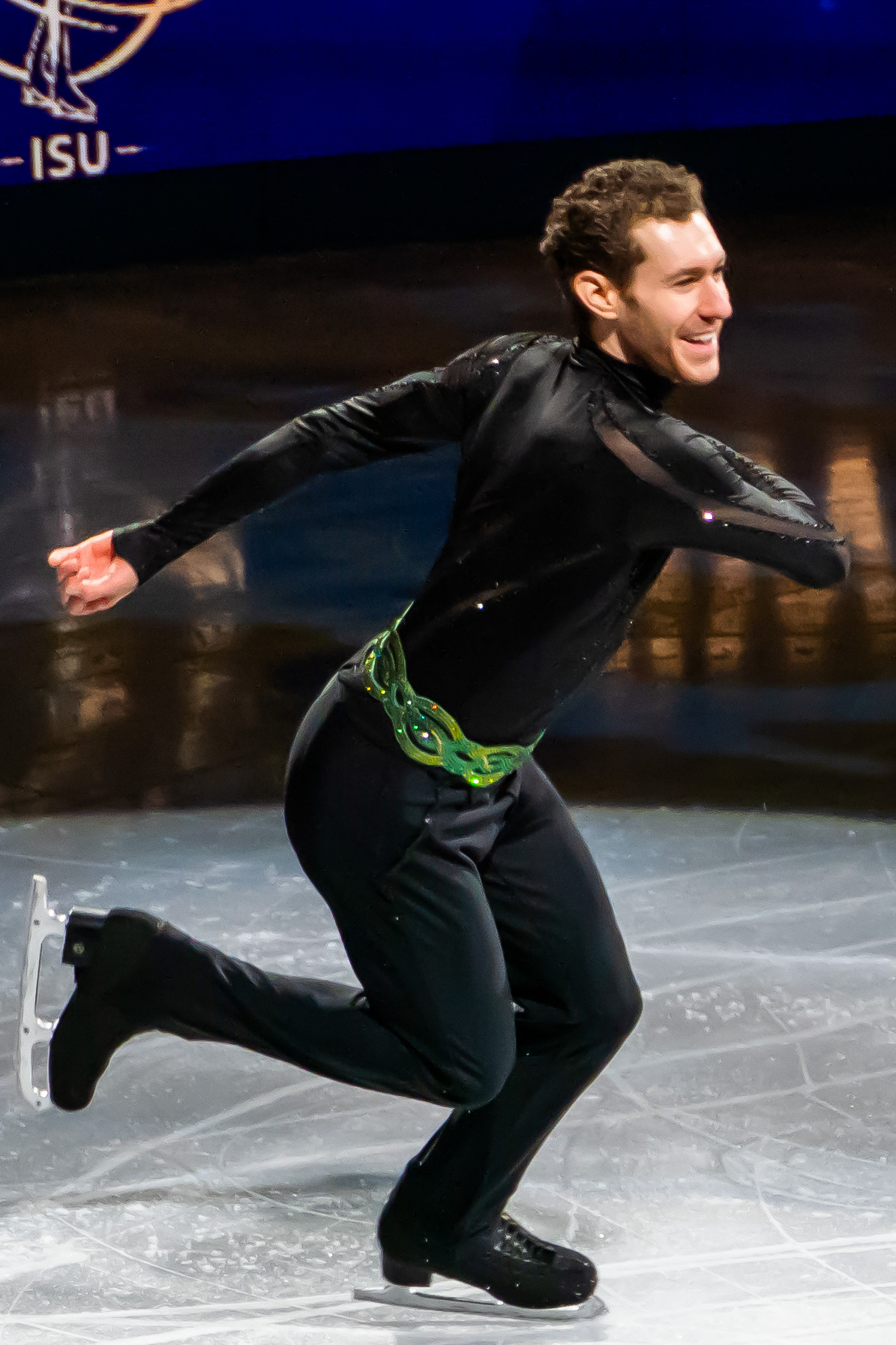
Brown during the gala at the 2025 World Championships

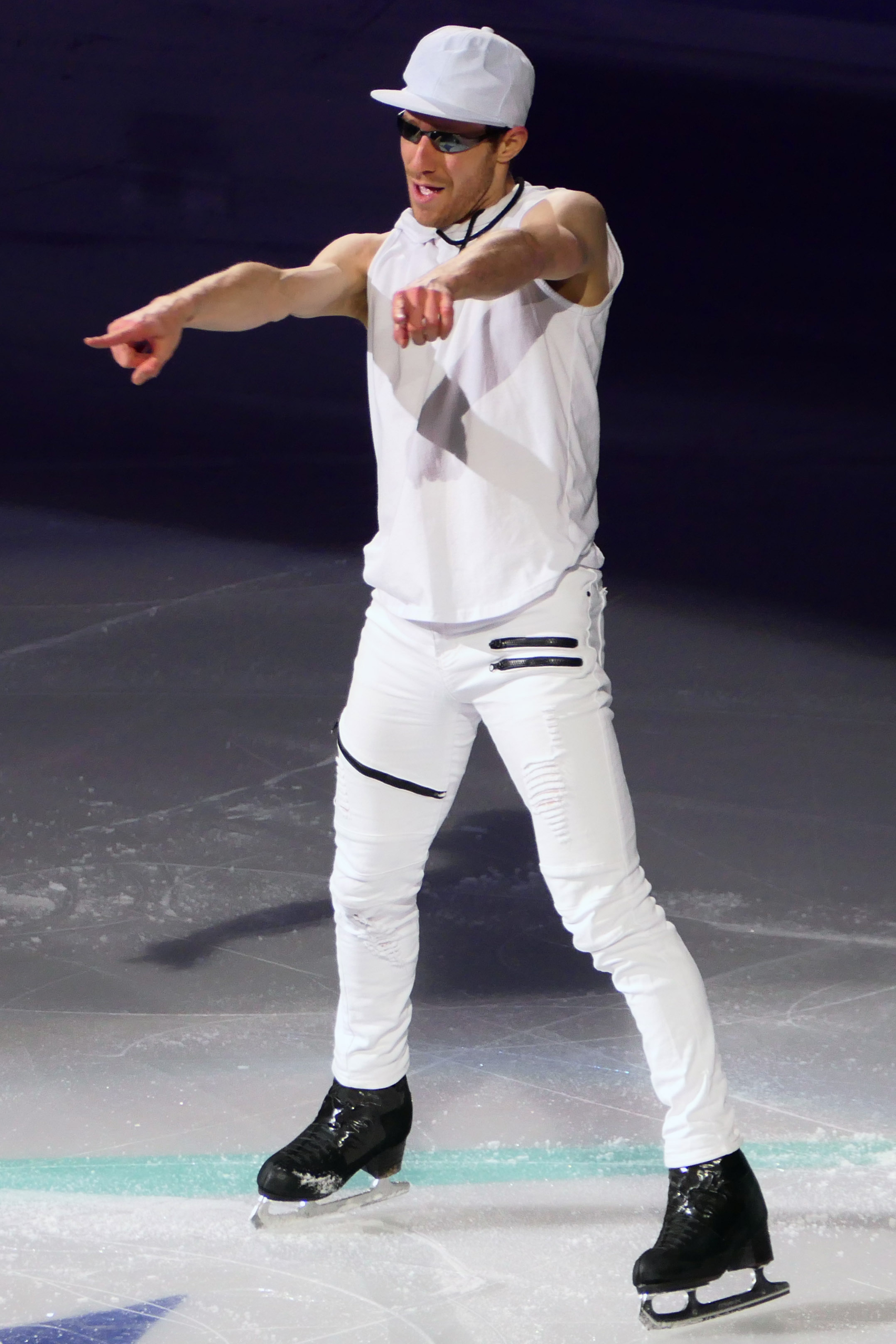
Brown during the gala at the 2024 World Championships

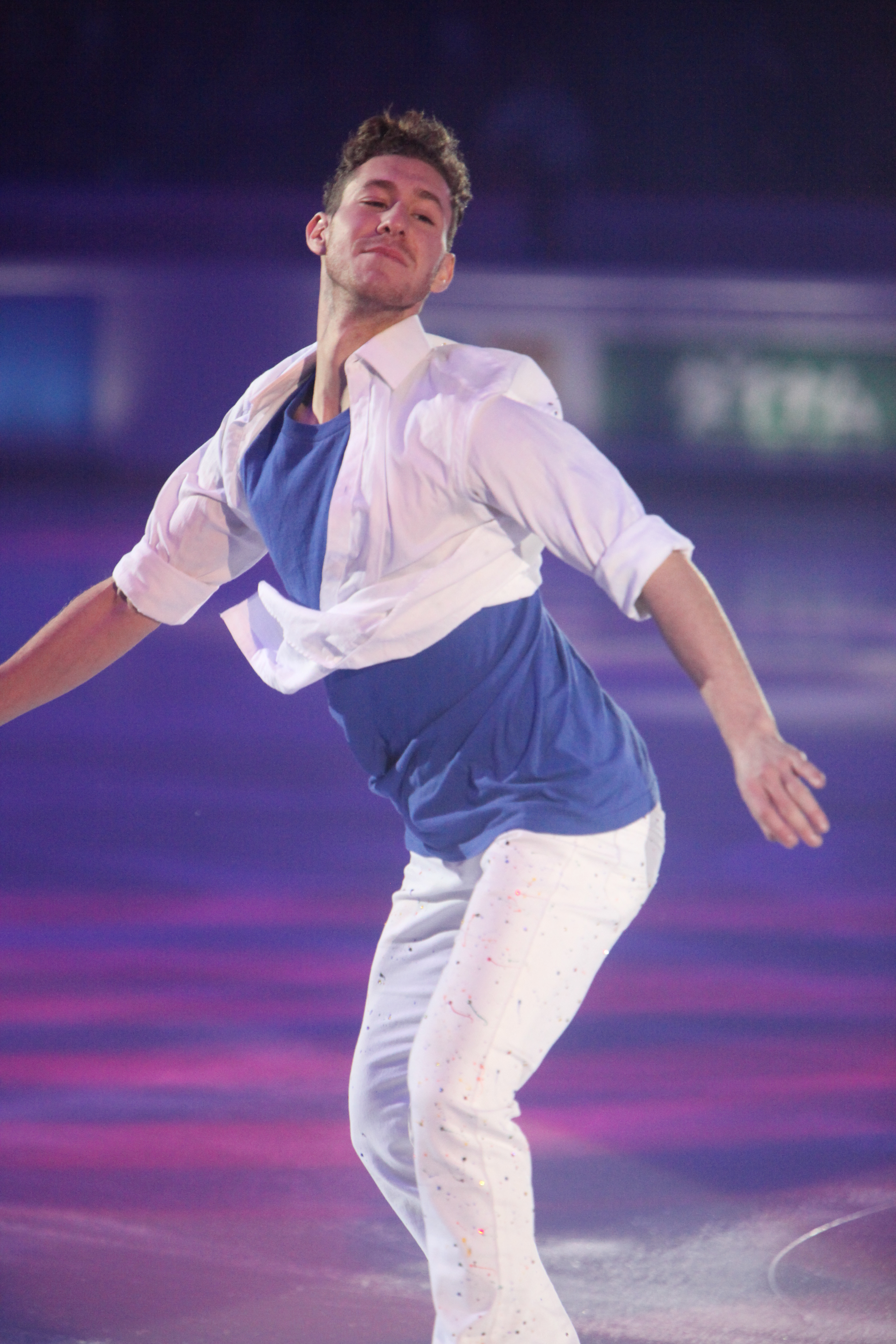
Brown at the 2018 Internationaux de France

Season	Short program	Free skate	Exhibition	Ref.
2007–08	—N/a	Storm By Antonio Vivaldi	—N/a	
2008–09	Money By Pink Floyd	Russian Cinema Music Performed by the Moscow Symphony Orchestra	—N/a	
2009–10	Hey! Pachuco! By Royal Crown Revue	Pas de Deux From The Nutcracker By Pyotr Ilyich Tchaikovsky	—N/a	
2010–11	Baliwood By King City	Nessun dorma From Turandot By Giacomo Puccini Performed by Vanessa-Mae	The Time Of My Life By David Cook	
2011–12	Grand Guignol By Bajofondo Tango Club Choreo. by Rohene Ward	Flow Like Water From The Last Airbender By James Newton Howard Choreo. by Rohene Ward	A Drop in the Ocean By Ron Pope Choreo. by Rohene Ward	
2012–13	The Question of U By Prince Choreo. by Rohene Ward	Liebesträume By Franz Liszt Choreo. by Rohene Ward	U Can't Touch This By MC Hammer Choreo. by Rohene Ward & Kori Ade	
2012–13	The Question of U By Prince Choreo. by Rohene Ward	Liebesträume By Franz Liszt Choreo. by Rohene Ward	A Drop in the Ocean	
2013–14	The Question of U By Prince Choreo. by Rohene Ward	Reel Around the Sun From Riverdance By Bill Whelan Choreo. by Rohene Ward	U Can't Touch This	
2014–15	Juke By Little Walters Choreo. by Rohene Ward	Tristan & Iseult By Maxime Rodriguez Choreo. by Rohene Ward	Cotton Eye Joe by Rednex	
2014–15	Juke By Little Walters Choreo. by Rohene Ward	Tristan & Iseult By Maxime Rodriguez Choreo. by Rohene Ward	Hip-hop mix	
2015–16	Love Is Blindness From The Great Gatsby Performed by The Grey Orchestra Choreo. by Rohene Ward	The Scent of Love From The Piano By Michael Nyman Choreo. by Rohene Ward	Hip-hop mix	
2015–16	Love Is Blindness From The Great Gatsby Performed by The Grey Orchestra Choreo. by Rohene Ward	The Scent of Love From The Piano By Michael Nyman Choreo. by Rohene Ward	Canned Heat By Jamiroquai	
2015–16	Appassionata By Secret Garden Choreo. by Rohene Ward; Writing's on the Wall By Sam Smith Choreo. by Rohene Ward	The Scent of Love From The Piano By Michael Nyman Choreo. by Rohene Ward		
2016–17	Appassionata By Secret Garden Choreo. by Rohene Ward; Writing's on the Wall By Sam Smith Choreo. by Rohene Ward	The Scent of Love From The Piano By Michael Nyman Choreo. by Rohene Ward	Canned Heat	
2016–17	Writing's on the Wall	The Scent of Love From The Piano By Michael Nyman Choreo. by Rohene Ward	Signed, Sealed, Delivered I'm Yours By Stevie Wonder Performed by Michael McDonald	
2017–18	The Room Where It Happens From Hamilton By Lin-Manuel Miranda Choreo. by Rohene Ward	Inner Love by Maxime Rodriguez Choreo. by Rohene Ward	Waving Through a Window From Dear Evan Hansen By Pasek and Paul Performed by Ben Platt	
2017–18	The Room Where It Happens From Hamilton By Lin-Manuel Miranda Choreo. by Rohene Ward	Inner Love by Maxime Rodriguez Choreo. by Rohene Ward	Can't Stop the Feeling! By Justin Timberlake Choreo. by Rohene Ward	
2017–18	The Room Where It Happens From Hamilton By Lin-Manuel Miranda Choreo. by Rohene Ward	The Scent of Love	The Room Where It Happens	
2018–19	Love is a Bitch By Two Feet Choreo. by Rohene Ward	Old Friends; Bookends; A Hazy Shade of Winter By Paul Simon Performed by Simon & Garfunkel Choreo. by David Wilson	Can't Stop the Feeling!	
2019–20	I Can't Go On Without You By Kaleo Choreo. by Rohene Ward	Schindler's List By John Williams Performed by Itzhak Perlman Choreo. by David Wilson	Greased Lightnin' From Glee	
2020–21	Sinner Man Performed by Nina Simone Choreo. by Rohene Ward	Slaughter on Tenth Avenue By Richard Rodgers Choreo. by David Wilson	—N/a	
2021–22	Sinner Man Performed by Nina Simone Choreo. by Rohene Ward	Schindler's List	I Lived By OneRepublic	
2022–23	Melancholy By Alexey Kosenko Choreo. by Rohene Ward	The Impossible Dream From Man of La Mancha By Mitch Leigh Performed by Josh Groban Choreo. by Rohene Ward	Everybody (Backstreet's Back); Larger Than Life By Backstreet Boys	
2023–24	Adiós By Benjamin Clementine Choreo. by Rohene Ward	The Legend of Tarzan By Rupert Gregson-Williams Choreo. by Rohene Ward	Everybody (Backstreet's Back); Larger Than Life By Backstreet Boys	
2023–24	Adiós By Benjamin Clementine Choreo. by Rohene Ward	The Impossible Dream	Everybody (Backstreet's Back); Larger Than Life By Backstreet Boys	
2024–25	The Legend of Tarzan	Spiegel im Spiegel By Arvo Pärt Choreo. by Rohene Ward	"Hit the Road Jack" Performed by 2WEI; "I Used to Feel Quite Sad at Outdoor Raves" By Mental Minority; The Impossible Dream; Reel Around the Sun	
2025–26	Reel Around the Sun	Say Something (Mahogany Session) By A Great Big World & Christina Aguilera Performed by Jacob Banks Choreo. by Rohene Ward, Randi Strong	Rock Around the Clock By Bill Haley & His Comets	

== Competitive highlights ==
- GP – Event of the ISU Grand Prix Series
- JGP – Event of the ISU Junior Grand Prix Series
- CS – Event of the ISU Challenger Series
- C – Event was cancelled
- TBD – Assigned
- WD – Withdrew from competition
- Medals at team events are awarded for the team results only. Individual placements at team events are listed in parentheses.

Competition placements at senior level
Season	2013–14	2014–15	2015–16	2016–17	2017–18	2018–19	2019–20	2020–21	2021–22	2022–23	2023–24	2024–25	2025–26	2026–27
Winter Olympics	9th								6th					
Winter Olympics (Team event)	3rd													
World Championships		4th		7th		9th	C	7th		5th	5th	8th		
Four Continents Championships		6th		6th	3rd	5th	2nd							
Grand Prix Final					6th									
U.S. Championships	2nd	1st		3rd	6th	3rd	2nd	3rd	4th	2nd	2nd		8th	
World Team Trophy		1st (2nd)		3rd (6th)				2nd (6th)		1st (4th)		1st (2nd)		
GP Finland													5th	
GP France	3rd					2nd			3rd					
GP NHK Trophy				7th	4th		5th					7th		TBD
GP Rostelecom Cup		5th												
GP Skate America	5th	2nd	3rd	2nd			2nd						4th	4th
GP Skate Canada					2nd	6th			2nd			8th		
CS Autumn Classic						4th								
CS Denis Ten Memorial													3rd	
CS Finlandia Trophy									1st					
CS Golden Spin of Zagreb						1st	1st							
CS Ice Challenge			2nd											
CS Lombardia Trophy				2nd	2nd									
CS Nebelhorn Trophy	2nd	1st												
CS Nepela Memorial			1st											
CS Trialeti Trophy													2nd	
CS U.S. Classic				1st										
CS Warsaw Cup											3rd			
Japan Open										2nd (5th)	2nd (5th)			
Shanghai Trophy												3rd		
Team Challenge Cup			1st (2nd)											

Competition placements at junior level
Season	2009–10	2010–11	2011–12	2012–13
World Junior Championships		7th	3rd	2nd
Junior Grand Prix Final			1st	4th
U.S. Championships (Senior)		9th	9th	8th
U.S. Championships (Junior)	1st			
JGP Australia			1st	
JGP France		2nd		2nd
JGP Italy			2nd	
JGP Japan		6th		
JGP Turkey				1st
Gardena Spring Trophy	1st			

== Detailed results ==
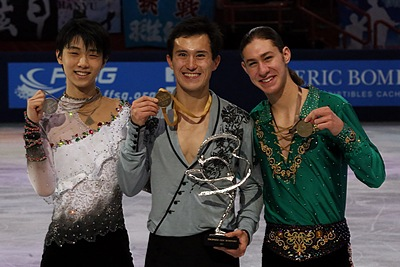
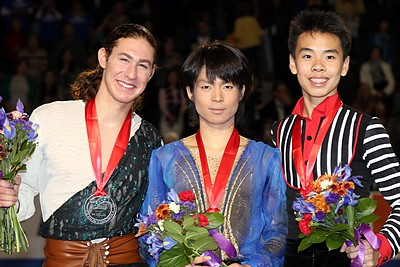
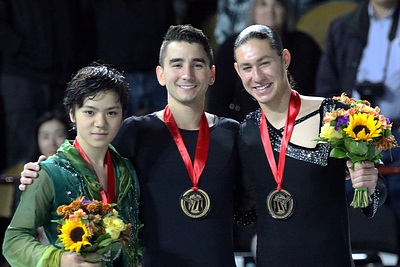
From left to right: the 2013 Trophée Eric Bompard podium, the 2014 Skate America podium, and the 2015 Skate America podium
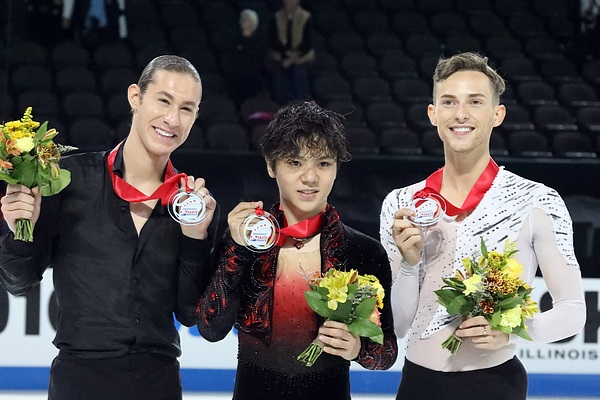
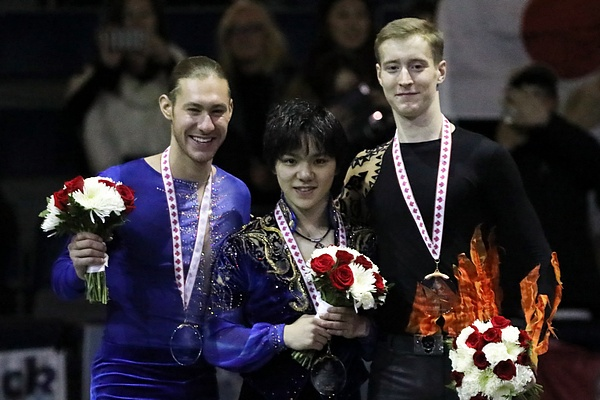
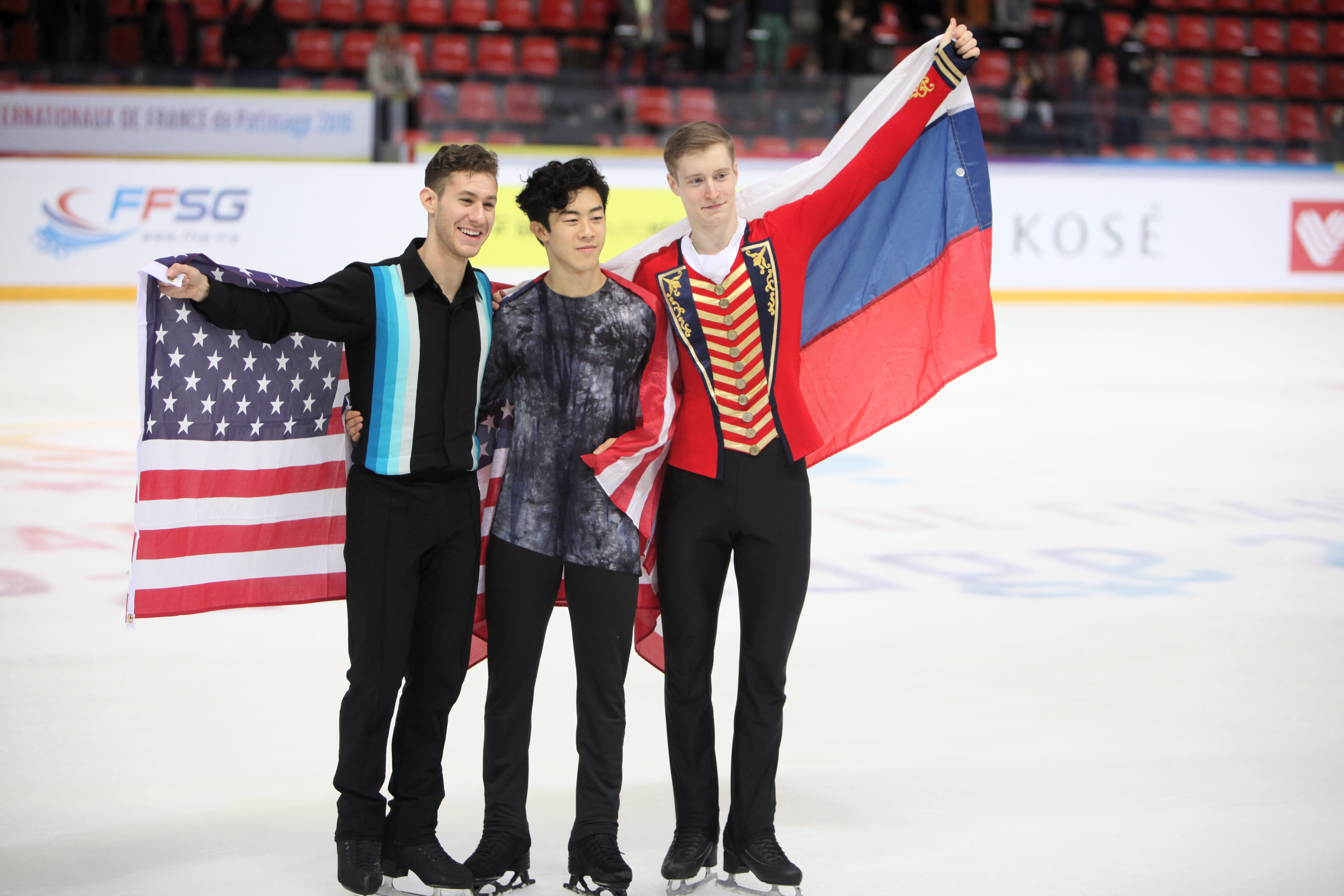
From left to right: the 2016 Skate America podium, the 2017 Skate Canada International podium, and the 2018 Internationaux de France podium

ISU personal best scores in the +5/-5 GOE System
Segment	Type	Score	Event
Total	TSS	281.24	2022 Winter Olympics
Short program	TSS	97.24	2022 Winter Olympics
Short program	TES	50.69	2018 Internationaux de France
Short program	PCS	47.95	2023 World Team Trophy
Free skating	TSS	185.87	2023 World Championships
Free skating	TES	90.03	2023 World Championships
Free skating	PCS	96.34	2022 Winter Olympics

ISU personal best scores in the +3/-3 GOE System
Segment	Type	Score	Event
Total	TSS	273.67	2017 World Team Trophy
Short program	TSS	94.32	2017 World Team Trophy
Short program	TES	48.43	2017 World Team Trophy
Short program	PCS	45.89	2017 World Team Trophy
Free skating	TSS	182.63	2016 Skate America
Free skating	TES	92.61	2016 Skate America
Free skating	PCS	92.08	2017 World Team Trophy

- Small medals for the short program and free skating are only awarded at ISU Championships.
- At national events in the United States, pewter medals are awarded for fourth place.
- Medals at team events are awarded for the team results only. Individual placements at team events are listed in parentheses.

=== Senior level ===
Results in the 2010–11 season
Date	Event	SP		FS		Total	
Date	Event	P	Score	P	Score	P	Score
Jan 22–30, 2011	(United States) 2011 U.S. Championships	11	64.32	7	144.44	9	208.76

Results in the 2011–12 season
Date	Event	SP		FS		Total	
Date	Event	P	Score	P	Score	P	Score
Jan 22–29, 2012	(United States) 2012 U.S. Championships	7	75.68	14	133.48	9	209.16

Results in the 2012–13 season
Date	Event	SP		FS		Total	
Date	Event	P	Score	P	Score	P	Score
Jan 19–27, 2013	(United States) 2013 U.S. Championships	7	74.05	8	149.24	8	223.29

Results in the 2013–14 season
Date	Event	SP		FS		Total	
Date	Event	P	Score	P	Score	P	Score
Sep 26–28, 2013	(Germany) 2013 Nebelhorn Trophy	2	79.41	2	149.02	2	228.43
Oct 17–20, 2013	(United States) 2013 Skate America	2	83.78	6	147.25	5	231.03
Nov 15–17, 2013	(France) 2013 Trophée Éric Bompard	3	84.77	3	158.32	3	243.09
Jan 5–12, 2014	(United States) 2014 U.S. Championships	3	87.47	1	182.61	2	270.08
Feb 6–9, 2014	(Russia) 2014 Winter Olympics (Team event)	—N/a	—N/a	4	153.67	3	—N/a
Feb 7–23, 2014	(Russia) 2014 Winter Olympics	6	86.00	11	152.37	9	238.37

Results in the 2014–15 season
Date	Event	SP		FS		Total	
Date	Event	P	Score	P	Score	P	Score
Sep 24–27, 2014	(Germany) 2014 CS Nebelhorn Trophy	1	83.59	1	153.38	1	237.17
Oct 24–26, 2014	(United States) 2014 Skate America	3	79.75	3	154.42	2	234.17
Nov 14–16, 2014	(Russia) 2014 Rostelecom Cup	7	76.32	4	159.24	5	235.56
Jan 18–25, 2015	(United States) 2015 U.S. Championships	1	93.36	2	181.62	1	274.98
Feb 9–15, 2015	(South Korea) 2015 Four Continents Championships	9	75.86	6	167.35	6	243.21
Mar 23–29, 2015	(China) 2015 World Championships	6	84.32	5	163.97	4	248.29
Apr 16–19, 2015	(Japan) 2015 World Team Trophy	3	86.38	2	176.69	1 (2)	263.17

Results in the 2015–16 season
Date	Event	SP		FS		Total	
Date	Event	P	Score	P	Score	P	Score
Oct 1–3, 2015	(Slovakia) 2015 CS Ondrej Nepela Trophy	2	76.98	1	162.39	1	239.37
Oct 23–25, 2015	(United States) 2015 Skate America	8	78.64	3	159.83	3	238.47
Oct 27–31, 2015	(Austria) 2015 Ice Challenge	1	85.29	4	155.36	2	240.65
Apr 22–24, 2016	(United States) 2016 Team Challenge Cup	4	87.72	2	181.50	1 (2)	269.22

Results in the 2016–17 season
Date	Event	SP		FS		Total	
Date	Event	P	Score	P	Score	P	Score
Sep 8–11, 2016	(Italy) 2016 CS Lombardia Trophy	2	81.58	1	174.91	2	256.49
Sep 14–18, 2016	(United States) 2016 CS U.S. Classic	2	83.18	1	170.86	1	254.04
Oct 21–23, 2016	(United States) 2016 Skate America	3	85.75	2	182.63	2	268.38
Nov 25–27, 2016	(Japan) 2016 NHK Trophy	8	74.33	7	144.14	7	218.47
Jan 14–22, 2017	(United States) 2017 U.S. Championships	4	79.23	3	175.00	3	254.23
Feb 15–19, 2017	(South Korea) 2017 Four Continents Championships	9	80.77	6	165.08	6	245.85
Mar 29 – Apr 2, 2017	(Finland) 2017 World Championships	8	93.10	7	176.47	7	269.57
Apr 20–23, 2017	(Japan) 2017 World Team Trophy	5	94.32	6	179.35	3 (6)	273.67

Results in the 2017–18 season
Date	Event	SP		FS		Total	
Date	Event	P	Score	P	Score	P	Score
Sep 14–17, 2017	(Italy) 2017 CS Lombardia Trophy	2	83.01	2	176.87	2	259.88
Oct 27–29, 2017	2017 Skate Canada International	3	90.71	2	170.43	2	261.14
Nov 10–12, 2017	(Japan) 2017 NHK Trophy	3	85.36	4	160.59	4	245.95
Dec 7–10, 2017	(Japan) 2017–18 Grand Prix Final	4	89.02	6	164.79	6	253.81
Dec 29 – Jan 8, 2018	(United States) 2018 U.S. Championships	3	93.23	6	160.45	6	253.68
Jan 22–28, 2018	(Taiwan) 2018 Four Continents Championships	4	89.78	3	179.44	3	269.22

Results in the 2018–19 season
Date	Event	SP		FS		Total	
Date	Event	P	Score	P	Score	P	Score
Sep 20–22, 2018	(Canada) 2018 CS Autumn Classic International	3	88.90	5	144.33	4	233.23
Oct 26–28, 2018	2018 Skate Canada International	11	76.46	6	158.51	6	234.97
Nov 23–25, 2018	2018 Internationaux de France	1	96.41	3	159.92	2	256.33
Dec 5–8, 2018	(Croatia) 2018 CS Golden Spin of Zagreb	2	95.50	1	167.92	1	263.42
Jan 19–27, 2019	(United States) 2019 U.S. Championships	2	100.52	3	172.56	3	273.08
Feb 7–10, 2019	(United States) 2019 Four Continents Championships	6	86.57	4	172.32	5	258.89
Mar 18–24, 2019	(Japan) 2019 World Championships	2	96.81	14	157.34	9	254.15

Results in the 2019–20 season
Date	Event	SP		FS		Total	
Date	Event	P	Score	P	Score	P	Score
Oct 18–20, 2019	(United States) 2019 Skate America	4	83.45	2	171.64	2	255.09
Nov 22–24, 2019	(Japan) 2019 NHK Trophy	8	73.73	4	157.54	5	231.27
Dec 4–7, 2019	(Croatia) 2019 CS Golden Spin of Zagreb	3	79.44	1	162.95	1	242.39
Jan 20–26, 2020	(United States) 2020 U.S. Championships	2	100.99	2	191.89	2	292.88
Feb 4–9, 2020	(South Korea) 2020 Four Continents Championships	3	94.71	2	180.11	2	274.82

Results in the 2020–21 season
Date	Event	SP		FS		Total	
Date	Event	P	Score	P	Score	P	Score
Jan 11–21, 2021	(United States) 2021 U.S. Championships	3	100.92	4	176.00	3	276.92
Mar 22–28, 2021	(Sweden) 2021 World Championships	7	91.25	8	170.92	7	262.17
Apr 15–18, 2021	(Japan) 2021 World Team Trophy	3	94.86	8	160.33	2 (6)	255.19

Results in the 2021–22 season
Date	Event	SP		FS		Total	
Date	Event	P	Score	P	Score	P	Score
Oct 7–10, 2021	(Finland) 2021 CS Finlandia Trophy	2	92.39	5	170.13	1	262.52
Oct 29–31, 2021	2021 Skate Canada International	2	94.00	3	165.55	2	259.55
Nov 19–21, 2021	2021 Internationaux de France	3	89.39	4	174.81	3	264.20
Jan 3–9, 2022	(United States) 2022 U.S. Championships	4	100.84	3	188.94	4	289.78
Feb 8–10, 2022	(China) 2022 Winter Olympics	6	97.24	6	184.00	6	281.24

Results in the 2022–23 season
Date	Event	SP		FS		Total	
Date	Event	P	Score	P	Score	P	Score
Oct 8, 2022	2022 Japan Open	—N/a	—N/a	5	163.57	2	—N/a
Jan 23–29, 2023	(United States) 2023 U.S. Championships	2	100.25	3	177.06	2	277.32
Mar 20–26, 2023	(Japan) 2023 World Championships	6	94.17	5	185.87	5	280.04
Apr 13–16, 2023	(Japan) 2023 World Team Trophy	4	95.61	3	183.43	1 (4)	279.04

Results in the 2023–24 season
Date	Event	SP		FS		Total	
Date	Event	P	Score	P	Score	P	Score
Oct 7, 2023	2023 Japan Open	—N/a	—N/a	5	144.38	2	—N/a
Nov 15–17, 2023	(Poland) 2023 CS Warsaw Cup	4	78.48	2	158.27	3	236.75
Jan 22–28, 2024	(United States) 2024 U.S. Championships	3	89.02	2	175.48	2	264.50
Mar 18–24, 2024	(Canada) 2024 World Championships	4	93.87	5	180.46	5	274.33

Results in the 2024–25 season
Date	Event	SP		FS		Total	
Date	Event	P	Score	P	Score	P	Score
Oct 3–5, 2024	(China) 2024 Shanghai Trophy	3	87.02	4	155.77	3	242.79
Oct 25–27, 2024	2024 Skate Canada International	7	79.03	9	139.72	8	218.75
Nov 8–10, 2024	(Japan) 2024 NHK Trophy	10	77.08	6	152.01	7	229.09
Mar 25–30, 2025	(United States) 2025 World Championships	12	84.72	4	180.68	8	265.40
Apr 17–20, 2025	(Japan) 2025 World Team Trophy	3	93.82	2	179.33	1 (2)	273.15

Results in the 2025–26 season
Date	Event	SP		FS		Total	
Date	Event	P	Score	P	Score	P	Score
Oct 1–4, 2025	(Kazakhstan) 2025 CS Denis Ten Memorial Challenge	3	86.61	3	171.20	3	257.81
Oct 8–11, 2025	(Georgia (country)) 2025 CS Trialeti Trophy	2	85.26	2	164.04	2	249.30
Nov 14–16, 2025	(United States) 2025 Skate America	5	82.69	3	156.90	4	239.59
Nov 21–23, 2025	(Finland) 2025 Finlandia Trophy	4	87.66	6	155.51	5	243.17
Jan 4–11, 2026	(United States) 2026 U.S. Championships	3	88.49	12	139.03	8	227.52

Results in the 2026–27 season
Date	Event	SP		FS		Total	
Date	Event	P	Score	P	Score	P	Score
Nov 13–15, 2026	(United States) 2026 Skate America	6	84.00	4	161.73	4	245.73

=== Junior level ===
Results in the 2009–10 season
Date	Event	SP		FS		Total	
Date	Event	P	Score	P	Score	P	Score
Jan 14–24, 2010	(United States) 2010 U.S. Championships (Junior)	2	62.10	2	133.12	1	195.22
Apr 1–3, 2010	(Italy) 2010 Gardena Spring Trophy	1	68.98	1	128.32	1	197.30

Results in the 2010–11 season
Date	Event	SP		FS		Total	
Date	Event	P	Score	P	Score	P	Score
Aug 25–28, 2010	2010 JGP France	3	58.00	1	122.57	2	180.57
Sep 22–26, 2010	2010 JGP Japan	4	57.13	7	110.15	6	167.28
Feb 28 – Mar 6, 2011	(South Korea) 2011 World Junior Championships	7	62.64	6	122.80	7	185.44

Results in the 2011–12 season
Date	Event	SP		FS		Total	
Date	Event	P	Score	P	Score	P	Score
Sep 8–10, 2011	2011 JGP Australia	1	68.20	1	129.03	1	197.23
Oct 6–8, 2011	2011 JGP Italy	2	68.37	2	125.91	2	219.37
Dec 8–11, 2011	(Canada) 2011–12 Junior Grand Prix Final	2	68.77	2	139.64	1	208.41
Feb 27 – Mar 4, 2012	(Belarus) 2012 World Junior Championships	4	70.20	3	144.70	3	214.90

Results in the 2012–13 season
Date	Event	SP		FS		Total	
Date	Event	P	Score	P	Score	P	Score
Aug 23–25, 2012	2012 JGP France	3	59.33	2	126.48	2	185.81
Sep 22–24, 2012	2012 JGP Turkey	1	65.95	1	132.21	1	198.16
Dec 6–9, 2012	(Russia) 2012–13 Junior Grand Prix Final	3	69.43	4	128.89	4	198.32
Feb 25 – Mar 3, 2013	(Italy) 2013 World Junior Championships	3	70.06	1	154.09	2	224.15

== See also ==
- List of Jewish Olympic medalists
