= Rohene Ward =

American figure skater (born 1983)

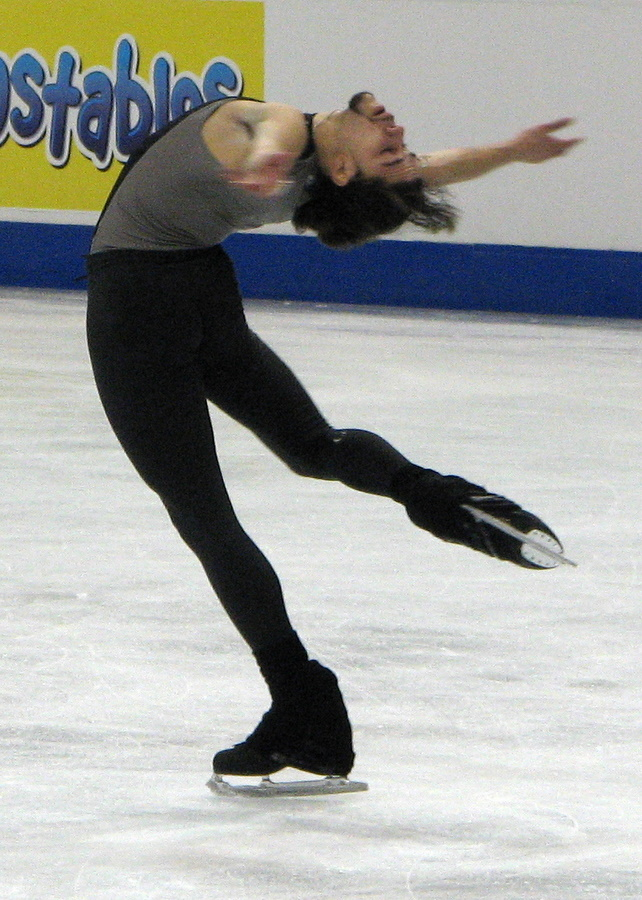
- Ward performs a layback spin in 2008.

Personal information
- Born: June 28, 1983 (age 43) Minneapolis, Minnesota

Figure skating career
- Country: United States
- Skating club: Starlight Ice Dance Club

Rohene Andre Ward (born June 28, 1983) is a retired American figure skater and choreographer. He competed four times at the U.S. Championships, in 2002, 2004, 2006 and 2008. He also competed for Puerto Rico and is the 2004 Puerto Rican national champion.

== Career ==
Ward is known for his flexibility, athleticism, and charisma, as well as jumping and spinning in both directions. His moves include the cantilever, the hydroblade, and the splits.

Ward was coached by Page Lipe in Minneapolis for 18 years. He attended North Community High School where he graduated in 2001. In 2005, he began training under coach Robin Wagner.

In 2007, Ward and Lipe co-coached Kirsten Olson. In 2007, he began co-coaching with Kori Ade in Highland Park, Illinois. At the 2008 U.S. Figure Skating Championships in Saint Paul, Minnesota, he became the first U.S. coach to compete in the national championships while also coaching another participant (Olson in the junior ladies' competition).

During the 2010–11 ice show season, Ward played Aladdin in Holiday on Ice's (HOI) European tour. He was then asked to be a principal skater in the HOI shows "Speed" and "Speed II", touring parts of Europe from the Netherlands to Norway from 2011–2013. In the 2013–14 season, he performed as a principal in the new HOI production of "Platinum" in France and Germany.

In spring 2013, Ward and Ade moved to Monument, Colorado to further expand 7K Skating Academy. They have coached several top students, including Jason Brown.

=== Choreographer ===
Ward is also a choreographer, working with a variety of skaters, including Brown, Courtney Hicks, Jordan Moeller, and Mariah Bell. In his choreography, he avoids music with lyrics, saying that "It inhibits the ability to create, because the words dictate." His choreography won critical acclaim when Brown's long program "Riverdance" ("Reel Around the Sun" by Bill Whelan) created an internet sensation, garnering more than five million YouTube hits following the 2014 US Championships.

Ward won "Choreographer of the Year" at the 2015 PSA conference in Bloomington, Minnesota. He won a second time in 2017 in Nashville, Tennessee. In between, Ward choreographed the opening ceremonies at the 2016 U.S. Championships. Ward won his third and fourth choreography awards in 2021 and 2023. In 2023, he also took home the Inspire award.

In 2020, Ward and Brown co-choreographed a tribute to Alvin Ailey set to Nina Simone's version of "Sinnerman," which Brown competed in both the 2020-2021 and 2021-2022 seasons, including at the 2022 Winter Olympics.

As of April 2021, Ward coaches at Fox Valley Ice Arena in Geneva, Illinois.

Skaters Ward has choreographed for include:

- Mariah Bell
- Jason Brown
- Karen Chen
- Madison Chock/Evan Bates
- Amber Glenn
- Courtney Hicks
- Tomoki Hiwatashi
- Alysa Liu
- Jordan Moeller
- Yaroslav Paniot
- Kaori Sakamoto
- Jacob Sanchez
- Anastasiia Smirnova/Danylo Siianytsia
- Sophie Joline von Felten

== Programs ==
| Season | Short program | Free skating |
|---|---|---|
| 2013–2014 | Din Da Da by Kevin Aviance | Weather Storm by Craig Armstrong |
| 2007–2008 | Eleonore by Maxime Rodriguez; The Messiah Will Come Again by Roy Buchanan | Dragon: The Bruce Lee Story |
| 2006–2007 | Eleonore by Maxime Rodriguez | Primavera Portena; Oblivion; Tango Ballet by Astor Piazzolla |
| 2005–2006 | The Messiah Will Come Again by Roy Buchanan | Primavera Portena; Oblivion; Tango Ballet by Astor Piazzolla |
| 2004–2005 | The Messiah Will Come Again by Roy Buchanan | Jesus Christ Superstar by Andrew Lloyd Webber |
| 2003–2004 | Vamos a Bailar by the Gipsy Kings | Glory (1989 film) |
| 2001–2003 | Medley by Michael Jackson | Violin Fantasy on the opera Turandot Giacomo Puccini performed by Vanessa-Mae |
| 2000–2001 | Istanbul (Not Constantinople) | Romeo and Juliet by Sergei Prokofiev |

== Results ==
International
| Event | 96–97 | 97–98 | 98–99 | 99–00 | 00–01 | 01–02 | 02–03 | 03–04 | 04–05 | 05–06 | 06–07 | 07–08 |
|---|---|---|---|---|---|---|---|---|---|---|---|---|
| Schäfer Memorial | | | | | | | 8th | | | | | |
| Triglav Trophy | | | | | 2nd J. | | | | | | | |
National
| U.S. Championships | 5th N. | | | | 6th J. | 14th | | 16th | | 17th | | 18th |
| Puerto Rican Champ. | | | | | | | | 1st | | | | |
| Midwestern Sectionals | 3rd N. | 7th J. | | 6th J. | 1st J. | 3rd | 5th | 3rd | 6th | 3rd | 6th | 2nd |
| UGL Regionals | 4th N. | 1st J. | 6th J. | 1st J. | 2nd J. | 2nd | | 1st | | | 1st | 1st |
Levels: N. = Novice; J. = Junior
