= U.S. International Figure Skating Classic =

International figure skating competition

- Status: Inactive
- Genre: ISU Challenger Series
- Country: United States
- Inaugurated: 2012
- Most recent: 2022 U.S. International Classic
- Organizer: U.S. Figure Skating

The U.S. International Figure Skating Classic was an annual figure skating competition sanctioned by the International Skating Union (ISU), organized and hosted by U.S. Figure Skating. The competition debuted in 2012 in Salt Lake City, and when the ISU launched the ISU Challenger Series in 2014, the U.S. International Classic was one of the inaugural competitions. The U.S. International Classic was a Challenger Series event seven times during its history. Medals were awarded in men's singles, women's singles, pair skating, and ice dance; and when the event was part of the Challenger Series, skaters earned points towards the World Standings and Season's World Ranking based on their results. The competition was last held in 2022. The 2022 event gained media attention when Ilia Malinin of the United States landed the first-ever quadruple Axel in competition.

Max Aaron of the United States holds the record for the most wins in men's singles (with three), while Satoko Miyahara of Japan holds the record in women's singles (with four). Ashley Cain and Timothy LeDuc of the United States, and Kirsten Moore-Towers and Dylan Moscovitch of Canada, are tied for the most wins in pair skating (with three), while Madison Hubbell and Zachary Donohue of the United States hold the record in ice dance (with five).

== History ==
The inaugural edition of the U.S. International Classic was held in 2012 in Salt Lake City. Skaters from the United States won a majority of the medals, including a sweep of the men's event. Max Aaron and Agnes Zawadzki of the United States won the men's and women's events, respectively. Kirsten Moore-Towers and Dylan Moscovitch of Canada won the pairs event, and Piper Gilles and Paul Poirier, also of Canada, won the ice dance event.

The ISU Challenger Series was introduced in 2014. It is a series of international figure skating competitions sanctioned by the International Skating Union and organized by ISU member nations. The objective is to ensure consistent organization and structure within a series of international competitions linked together, providing opportunities for senior-level skaters to compete at the international level and also earn points towards the World Standings and Season's World Ranking. When an event is held as part of the Challenger Series, it must host at least three of the four disciplines (men's singles, women's singles, pair skating, and ice dance) and representatives from at least ten different ISU member nations. The minimum number of entrants required for each discipline is eight skaters each in men's singles and women's singles, five teams in pair skating, and six teams in ice dance. Each ISU member nation is eligible to enter up to three skaters or teams per discipline in each competition, although U.S. Figure Skating could enter an unlimited number of entrants in their own event.

The U.S. International Classic continued to be held in Salt Lake City and was a Challenger Series event from 2014 through 2019. No competition was held in 2020 due to the COVID-19 pandemic, although it had already been left off the slate of competitions for the 2020–21 ISU Challenger Series. The U.S. International Classic returned in 2021, hosted by the Skating Club of Boston at their new facility in Norwood, Massachusetts. The 2021 edition was not part of the Challenger Series, and the pairs event was also omitted.

The 2022 U.S. International Classic was held at the Herb Brooks Arena in Lake Placid, New York. The event gained media attention when Ilia Malinin of the United States performed the first-ever quadruple Axel in competition. While skaters in the past had attempted a quadruple Axel, Malinin was the first to successfully land one with four-and-a-half proper rotations in the air. Although the 2022 installment was held as an event in the 2022–23 ISU Challenger Series, it was also the last installment of the U.S. International Classic to be held.

== Senior results ==
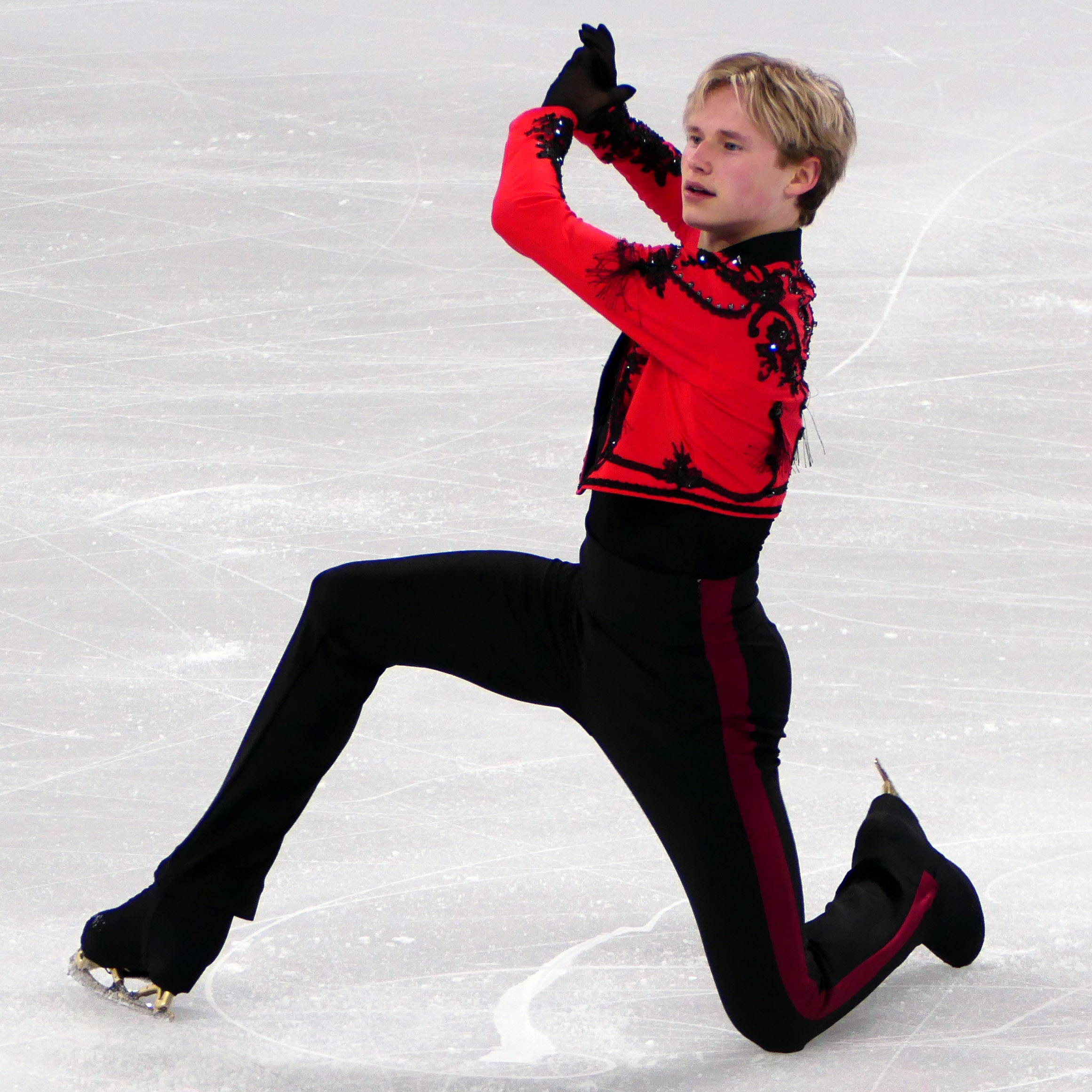
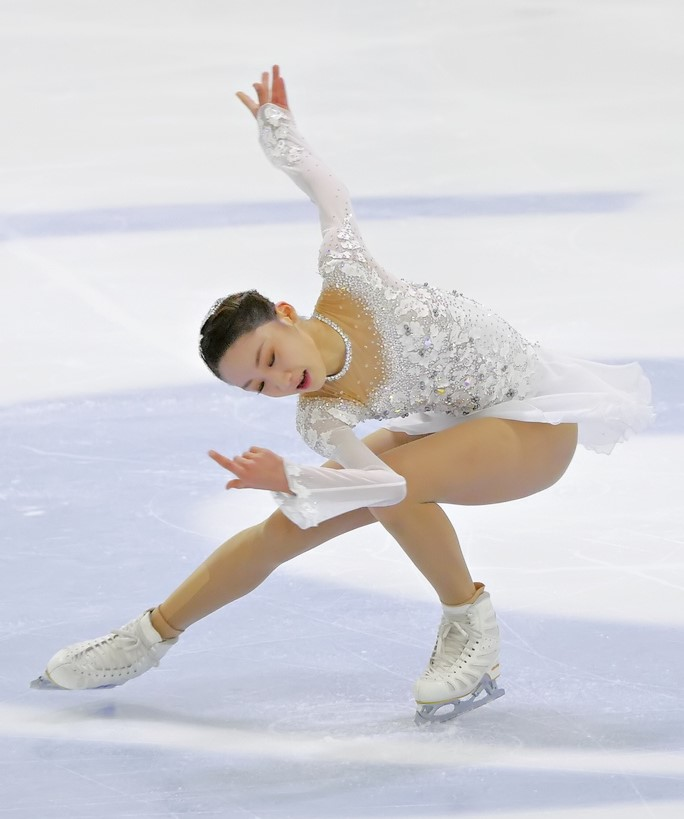
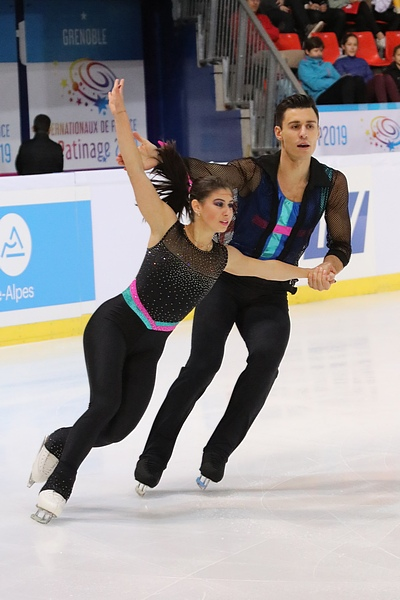
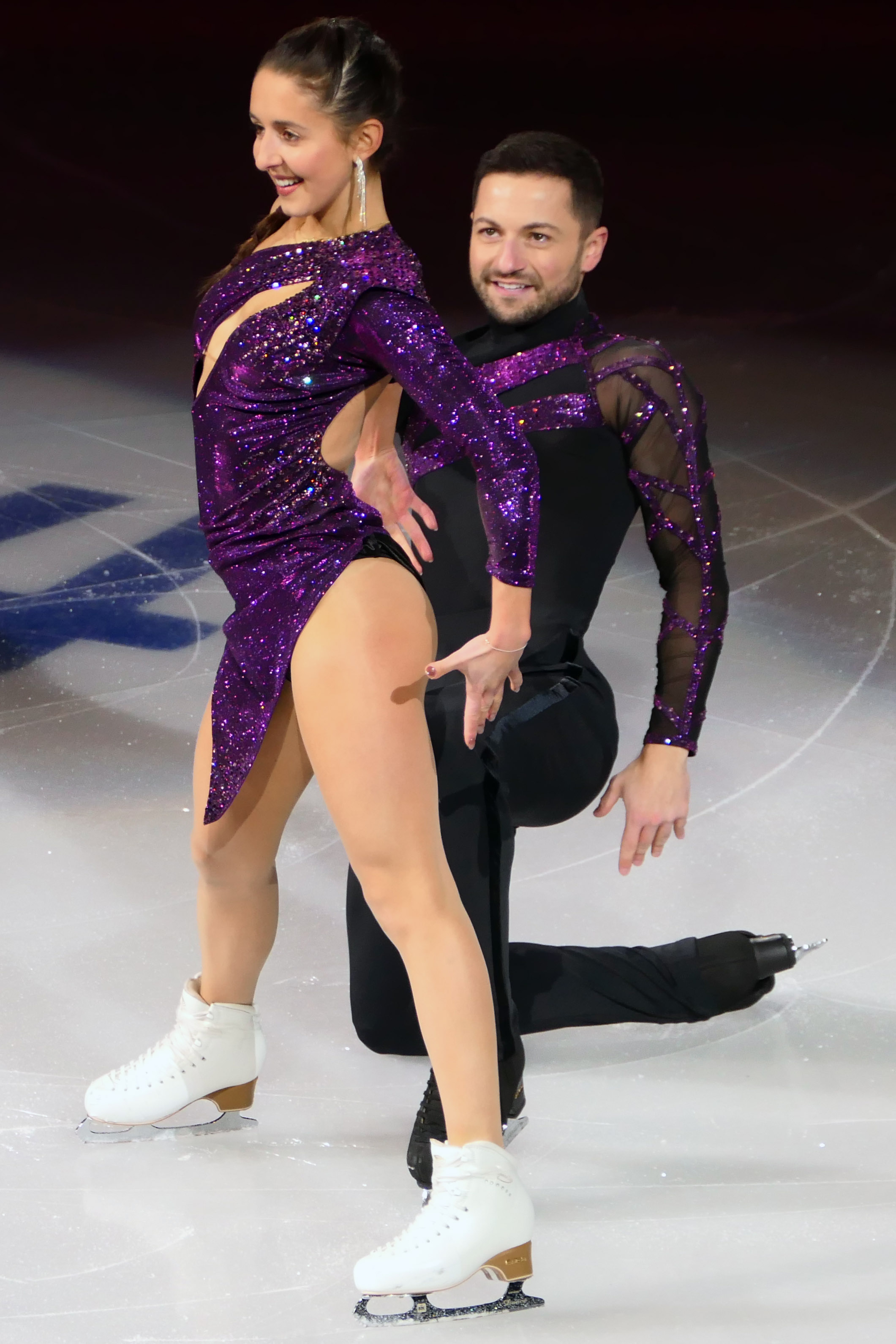
The 2022 U.S. International Classic champions (from left to right): Ilia Malinin of the United States (men's singles); Kim Ye-lim of South Korea (women's singles); Rebecca Ghilardi and Filippo Ambrosini of Italy (pair skating); and Lilah Fear and Lewis Gibson of Great Britain (ice dance)

CS: Challenger Series event

=== Men's singles ===
Men's event medalists
Year	Location	Gold	Silver	Bronze	Ref.
2012	Salt Lake City, Utah	(United States) Max Aaron	(United States) Armin Mahbanoozadeh	(United States) Ross Miner	
2013	Salt Lake City, Utah	(United States) Max Aaron	(United States) Stephen Carriere	(United States) Joshua Farris	
2014 CS	Salt Lake City, Utah	(United States) Max Aaron	(United States) Ross Miner	(Japan) Daisuke Murakami	
2015 CS	Salt Lake City, Utah	(Israel) Daniel Samohin	(Japan) Keiji Tanaka	(United States) Ross Miner	
2016 CS	Salt Lake City, Utah	(United States) Jason Brown	(Japan) Takahito Mura	(United States) Adam Rippon	
2017 CS	Salt Lake City, Utah	(United States) Nathan Chen	(United States) Max Aaron	(Canada) Liam Firus	
2018 CS	Salt Lake City, Utah	(Canada) Nam Nguyen	(Czech Republic) Michal Březina	(United States) Jimmy Ma	
2019 CS	Salt Lake City, Utah	(Japan) Keiji Tanaka	(Japan) Sota Yamamoto	(United States) Vincent Zhou	
2020	Competition cancelled due to the COVID-19 pandemic				
2021	Norwood, Massachusetts	(Czech Republic) Michal Březina	(United States) Jimmy Ma	(United States) Eric Sjoberg	
2022 CS	Lake Placid, New York	(United States) Ilia Malinin	(France) Kévin Aymoz	(United States) Camden Pulkinen	

=== Women's singles ===
Women's event medalists
Year	Location	Gold	Silver	Bronze	Ref.
2012	Salt Lake City, Utah	(United States) Agnes Zawadzki	(United States) Gracie Gold	(Canada) Amelie Lacoste	
2013	Salt Lake City, Utah	(United States) Courtney Hicks	(United States) Gracie Gold	(United States) Samantha Cesario	
2014 CS	Salt Lake City, Utah	(United States) Polina Edmunds	(United States) Courtney Hicks	(Japan) Riona Kato	
2015 CS	Salt Lake City, Utah	(Japan) Satoko Miyahara	(Kazakhstan) Elizabet Tursynbayeva	(United States) Angela Wang	
2016 CS	Salt Lake City, Utah	(Japan) Satoko Miyahara	(United States) Mariah Bell	(United States) Karen Chen	
2017 CS	Salt Lake City, Utah	(Japan) Marin Honda	(United States) Mirai Nagasu	(United States) Karen Chen	
2018 CS	Salt Lake City, Utah	(Japan) Satoko Miyahara	(South Korea) Lim Eun-soo	(South Korea) Kim Ye-lim	
2019 CS	Salt Lake City, Utah	(Japan) Satoko Miyahara	(South Korea) You Young	(United States) Amber Glenn	
2020	Competition cancelled due to the COVID-19 pandemic				
2021	Norwood, Massachusetts	(Russia) Alexandra Trusova	(South Korea) Park Yeon-jeong	(United States) Gabriella Izzo	
2022 CS	Lake Placid, New York	(South Korea) Kim Ye-lim	(South Korea) You Young	(Japan) Mana Kawabe	

=== Pairs ===
Pairs event medalists
Year	Location	Gold	Silver	Bronze	Ref.
2012	Salt Lake City, Utah	(Canada); Kirsten Moore-Towers; Dylan Moscovitch	(Canada); Paige Lawrence; Rudi Swiegers	(United States); Tiffany Vise; Don Baldwin	
2013	Salt Lake City, Utah	(Canada); Kirsten Moore-Towers; Dylan Moscovitch	(United States); Caydee Denney; John Coughlin	(United States); Tarah Kayne; Daniel O'Shea	
2014 CS	Salt Lake City, Utah	(United States); Alexa Scimeca; Chris Knierim	(United States); Jessica Calalang; Zack Sidhu	(United States); Madeline Aaron; Max Settlage	
2015 CS	Salt Lake City, Utah	(United States); Tarah Kayne; Daniel O'Shea	(United States); Marissa Castelli; Mervin Tran	(Canada); Kirsten Moore-Towers; Michael Marinaro	
2016 CS	Salt Lake City, Utah	(Canada); Brittany Jones; Joshua Reagan	(United States); Jessica Calalang; Zack Sidhu	(United States); Alexandria Shaughnessy; James Morgan	
2017 CS	Salt Lake City, Utah	(Canada); Kirsten Moore-Towers; Michael Marinaro	(United States); Alexa Scimeca Knierim; Chris Knierim	(United States); Chelsea Liu; Brian Johnson	
2018 CS	Salt Lake City, Utah	(United States); Ashley Cain; Timothy LeDuc	(United States); Audrey Lu; Misha Mitrofanov	(Australia); Ekaterina Alexandrovskaya; Harley Windsor	
2019 CS	Salt Lake City, Utah	(United States); Ashley Cain; Timothy LeDuc	(Russia); Evgenia Tarasova; Vladimir Morozov	(China); Peng Cheng; Jin Yang	
2020	Competition cancelled due to the COVID-19 pandemic				
2021	Norwood, Massachusetts	No pairs competition held			
2022 CS	Lake Placid, New York	(Italy); Rebecca Ghilardi; Filippo Ambrosini	(United States); Emily Chan; Spencer Akira Howe	(United States); Valentina Plazas; Maximiliano Fernandez	

=== Ice dance ===
Ice dance event medalists
Year	Location	Gold	Silver	Bronze	Ref.
2012	Salt Lake City, Utah	(Canada); Piper Gilles; Paul Poirier	(Canada); Alexandra Paul; Mitchell Islam	(United States); Lynn Kriengkrairut; Logan Giulietti-Schmitt	
2013	Salt Lake City, Utah	(United States); Meryl Davis; Charlie White	(Canada); Kaitlyn Weaver; Andrew Poje	(Canada); Nicole Orford; Thomas Williams	
2014 CS	Salt Lake City, Utah	(United States); Alexandra Aldridge; Daniel Eaton	(Canada); Nicole Orford; Thomas Williams	(United States); Anastasia Cannuscio; Colin McManus	
2015 CS	Salt Lake City, Utah	(United States); Madison Hubbell; Zachary Donohue	(Denmark); Laurence Fournier Beaudry; Nikolaj Sørensen	(Canada); Élisabeth Paradis; François-Xavier Ouellette	
2016 CS	Salt Lake City, Utah	(United States); Madison Hubbell; Zachary Donohue	(Japan); Kana Muramoto; Chris Reed	(Canada); Alexandra Paul; Mitchell Islam	
2017 CS	Salt Lake City, Utah	(United States); Madison Hubbell; Zachary Donohue	(United States); Kaitlin Hawayek; Jean-Luc Baker	(Japan); Kana Muramoto; Chris Reed	
2018 CS	Salt Lake City, Utah	(United States); Madison Hubbell; Zachary Donohue	(United States); Christina Carreira; Anthony Ponomarenko	(Japan); Misato Komatsubara; Tim Koleto	
2019 CS	Salt Lake City, Utah	(United States); Madison Chock; Evan Bates	(United States); Christina Carreira; Anthony Ponomarenko	(Canada); Carolane Soucisse; Shane Firus	
2020	Competition cancelled due to the COVID-19 pandemic				
2021	Norwood, Massachusetts	(United States); Madison Hubbell; Zachary Donohue	(Russia); Diana Davis; Gleb Smolkin	(United States); Eva Pate; Logan Bye	
2022 CS	Lake Placid, New York	(United Kingdom); Lilah Fear; Lewis Gibson	(United States); Eva Pate; Logan Bye	(United States); Lorraine McNamara; Anton Spiridonov	

== Records ==
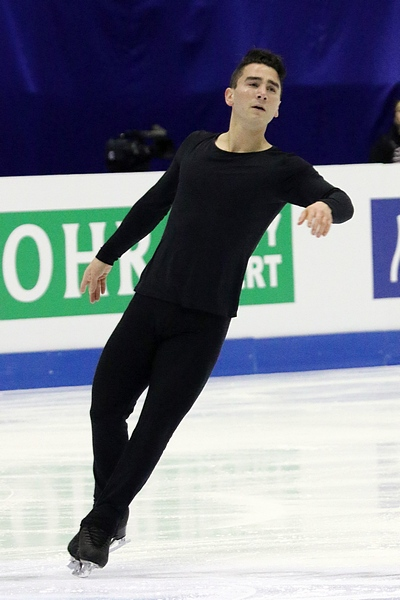
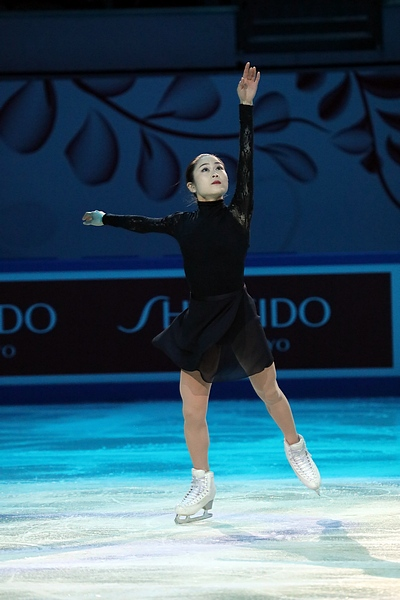
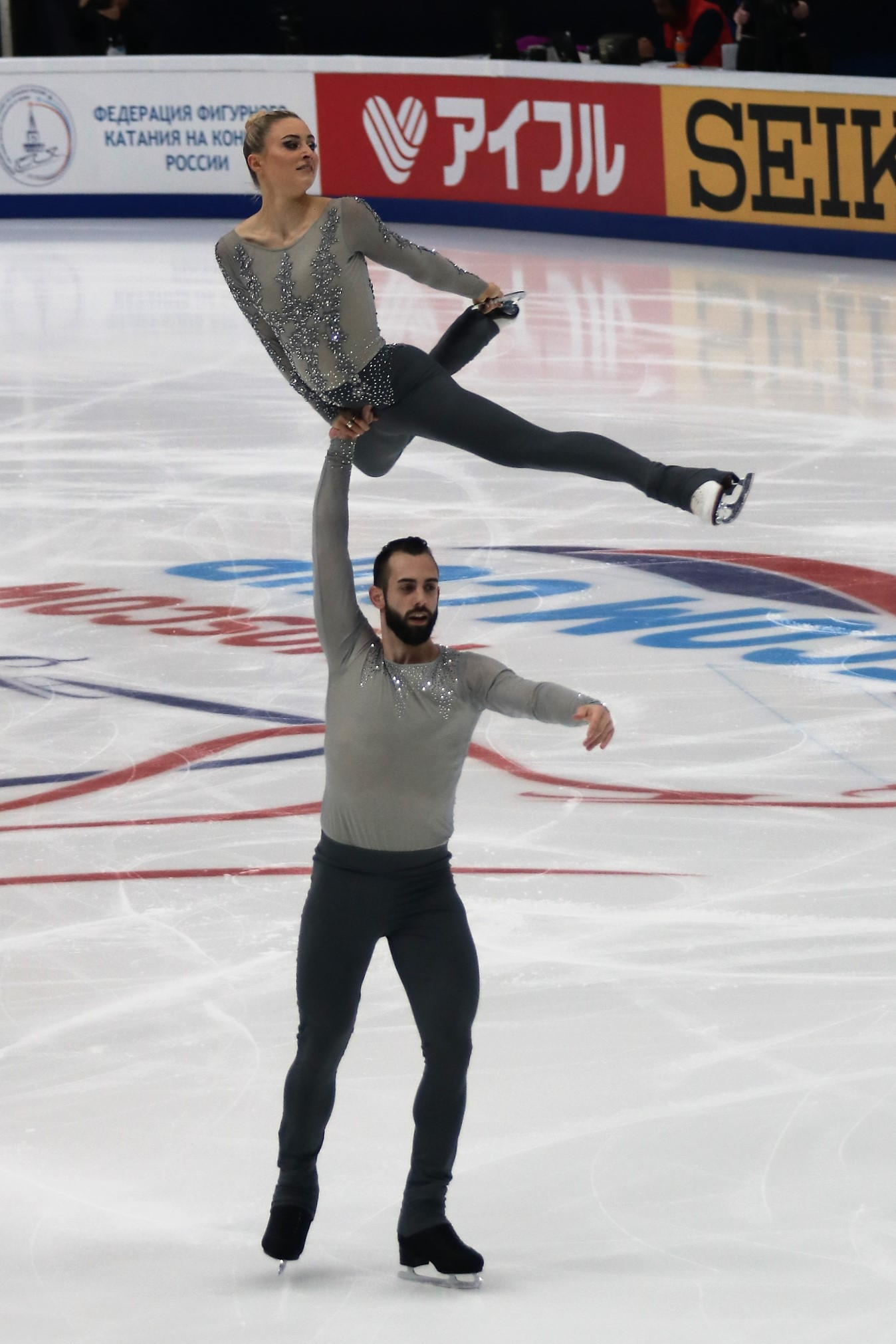
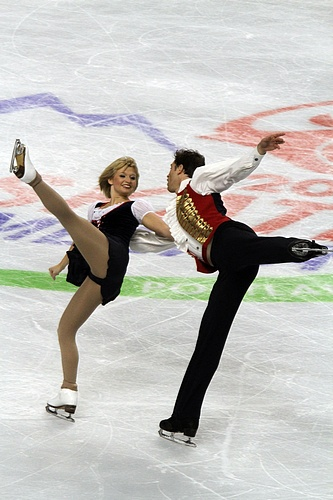
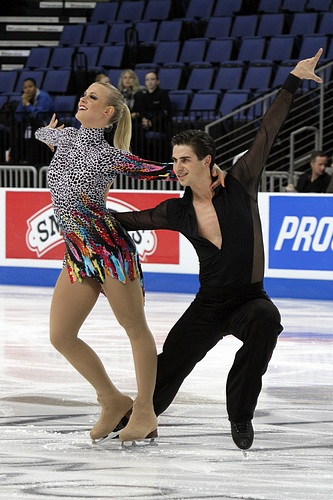
From left to right: Max Aaron of the United States won three U.S. International Classic titles in men's singles; Satoko Miyahara of Japan won four U.S. International Classic titles in women's singles; Ashley Cain and Timothy LeDuc of the United States, and Kirsten Moore-Towers and Dylan Moscovitch of Canada, each won two U.S. International Classic titles in pair skating; and Madison Hubbell and Zachary Donohue of the United States won five U.S. International Classic titles in ice dance.

Records
Discipline	Most titles			
Discipline	Skater(s)	No.	Years	Ref.
Men's singles	(United States); Max Aaron	3	2012–14	
Women's singles	(Japan); Satoko Miyahara	4	2015–16; 2018–19	
Pairs	(United States); Ashley Cain; Timothy LeDuc	2	2018–19	
Pairs	(Canada); Kirsten Moore-Towers; Dylan Moscovitch	2	2012–13	
Ice dance	(United States); Madison Hubbell; Zachary Donohue	5	2015–18; 2021	

== Cumulative medal count ==
=== Men's singles ===
Total number of U.S. International Classic medals in men's singles by nation
Rank	Nation	Gold	Silver	Bronze	Total
1	United States	6	5	8	19
2	Japan	1	3	1	5
3	Czech Republic	1	1	0	2
4	Canada	1	0	1	2
5	Israel	1	0	0	1
6	France	0	1	0	1
Totals (6 entries)		10	10	10	30

=== Women's singles ===
Total number of U.S. International Classic medals in women's singles by nation
Rank	Nation	Gold	Silver	Bronze	Total
1	Japan	5	0	2	7
2	United States	3	5	6	14
3	South Korea	1	4	1	6
4	Russia	1	0	0	1
5	Kazakhstan	0	1	0	1
6	Canada	0	0	1	1
Totals (6 entries)		10	10	10	30

=== Pairs ===
Total number of U.S. International Classic medals in pairs by nation
Rank	Nation	Gold	Silver	Bronze	Total
1	United States	4	7	6	17
2	Canada	4	1	1	6
3	Italy	1	0	0	1
4	Russia	0	1	0	1
5	Australia	0	0	1	1
5	China	0	0	1	1
Totals (6 entries)		9	9	9	27

=== Ice dance ===
Total number of U.S. International Classic medals in ice dance by nation
Rank	Nation	Gold	Silver	Bronze	Total
1	United States	8	4	4	16
2	Canada	1	3	4	8
3	Great Britain	1	0	0	1
4	Japan	0	1	2	3
5	Denmark	0	1	0	1
5	Russia	0	1	0	1
Totals (6 entries)		10	10	10	30

=== Total medals ===
Total number of U.S. International Classic medals by nation
Rank	Nation	Gold	Silver	Bronze	Total
1	United States	21	21	24	66
2	Canada	6	4	7	17
3	Japan	6	4	5	15
4	South Korea	1	4	1	6
5	Russia	1	2	0	3
6	Czech Republic	1	1	0	2
7	Great Britain	1	0	0	1
7	Israel	1	0	0	1
7	Italy	1	0	0	1
10	Denmark	0	1	0	1
10	France	0	1	0	1
10	Kazakhstan	0	1	0	1
13	Australia	0	0	1	1
13	China	0	0	1	1
Totals (14 entries)		39	39	39	117
