= Kori Ade =

American figure-skating coach

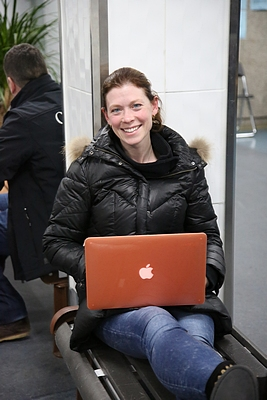
- Ade in 2015

Figure skating career
- Country: United States

Kori Ade is an American figure skating coach best known for coaching Jason Brown from childhood to his appearance at the 2014 Winter Olympics in Sochi, where he won a bronze medal in the team event. She has worked with multiple national and international competitors and has been recognized for her contributions to athlete development in U.S. figure skating.

== Career ==
Ade began coaching in the Chicago area, working with developmental and competitive skaters. She began coaching Jason Brown when he was five years old and continued with him through his juvenile, junior, and senior levels of competition. In 2011, Ade was named the U.S. Figure Skating / Professional Skaters Association Developmental Coach of the Year.

In 2013, Ade relocated with Brown to Monument, Colorado, where she established a new training base. She has collaborated with choreographer Rohene Ward, with whom she began co-coaching in Highland Park, Illinois in 2007. In 2019, she moved to Nashville, Tennessee, to join the Scott Hamilton Skating Academy.

== Notable students ==
Ade is best known for her long-term coaching of Jason Brown, who trained with her from age five and qualified for the 2014 Winter Olympics.

French national champion Laurine Lecavelier moved to Colorado Springs to train with Ade and Rohene Ward.

Tomoki Hiwatashi trained with Ade during the 2016–17 season in Monument, Colorado.

Mariah Bell relocated to Colorado shortly after graduating high school to train under Ade.

== Coaching approach ==
Ade is associated with coaching methods that emphasize both technical development and psychological preparation for competition. With several athletes, she has incorporated off-ice training, mental conditioning, and collaborative work with specialists and choreographers.
