= 2016–17 ISU Challenger Series =

- Type: ISU Challenger Series
- Date: September 7 – December 10, 2016
- Season: 2016–17
- Previous: 2015–16 ISU Challenger Series
- Next: 2017–18 ISU Challenger Series

The 2016–17 ISU Challenger Series was held from September to December 2016. It was the third season that the ISU Challenger Series, a group of senior-level international figure skating competitions, was held.

== Competitions ==
This season, the series included the following events. The Ukrainian Open was originally scheduled for November 9–13, 2016, but it was cancelled on September 20.

Date	Event	Location	Results
September 7–11	(Italy) 2016 Lombardia Trophy	Bergamo, Italy	Details
September 14–18	(United States) 2016 U.S. International Classic	Salt Lake City, Utah, United States	Details
September 22–24	(Germany) 2016 Nebelhorn Trophy	Oberstdorf, Germany	Details
September 28 – October 1	(Canada) 2016 Autumn Classic International	Montreal, Quebec, Canada	Details
September 28 – October 2	(Slovakia) 2016 Ondrej Nepela Memorial	Bratislava, Slovakia	Details
October 6–9	(Finland) 2016 Finlandia Trophy	Espoo, Finland	Details
November 9–13	(Ukraine) 2016 Ukrainian Open	Cancelled	
November 17–20	(Poland) 2016 Warsaw Cup	Warsaw, Poland	Details
November 22–27	(Estonia) 2016 Tallinn Trophy	Tallinn, Estonia	Details
December 7–10	(Croatia) 2016 Golden Spin of Zagreb	Zagreb, Croatia	Details

== Medal summary ==
=== Men's singles ===
Competition	Gold	Silver	Bronze	Results
(Italy) Lombardia Trophy	(Japan) Shoma Uno	(United States) Jason Brown	(United States) Max Aaron	Details
(United States) U.S. International Classic	(United States) Jason Brown	(Japan) Takahito Mura	(United States) Adam Rippon	Details
(Germany) Nebelhorn Trophy	(Russia) Alexander Petrov	(Belgium) Jorik Hendrickx	(United States) Grant Hochstein	Details
(Canada) Autumn Classic International	(Japan) Yuzuru Hanyu	(Uzbekistan) Misha Ge	(United States) Max Aaron	Details
(Slovakia) Ondrej Nepela Memorial	(Russia) Sergei Voronov	(Canada) Kevin Reynolds	(Russia) Roman Savosin	Details
(Finland) Finlandia Trophy	(United States) Nathan Chen	(Canada) Patrick Chan	(Russia) Maxim Kovtun	Details
(Poland) Warsaw Cup	(Sweden) Alexander Majorov	(Russia) Dmitri Aliev	(Switzerland) Stéphane Walker	Details
(Estonia) Tallinn Trophy	(Russia) Roman Savosin	(Russia) Anton Shulepov	(United States) Andrew Torgashev	Details
(Croatia) Golden Spin of Zagreb	(Israel) Oleksii Bychenko	(Israel) Daniel Samohin	(Canada) Keegan Messing	Details

=== Ladies' singles ===
Competition	Gold	Silver	Bronze	Results
(Italy) Lombardia Trophy	(Japan) Wakaba Higuchi	(South Korea) Kim Na-hyun	(United States) Mirai Nagasu	Details
(United States) U.S. International Classic	(Japan) Satoko Miyahara	(United States) Mariah Bell	(United States) Karen Chen	Details
(Germany) Nebelhorn Trophy	(Japan) Mai Mihara	(Russia) Elizaveta Tuktamysheva	(Canada) Gabrielle Daleman	Details
(Canada) Autumn Classic International	(United States) Mirai Nagasu	(Canada) Alaine Chartrand	(Kazakhstan) Elizabet Tursynbayeva	Details
(Slovakia) Ondrej Nepela Memorial	(Russia) Maria Sotskova	(Russia) Yulia Lipnitskaya	(United States) Mariah Bell	Details
(Finland) Finlandia Trophy	(Canada) Kaetlyn Osmond	(Japan) Mao Asada	(Russia) Anna Pogorilaya	Details
(Poland) Warsaw Cup	(Germany) Nicole Schott	(Australia) Kailani Craine	(Russia) Alexandra Avstriyskaya	Details
(Estonia) Tallinn Trophy	(Russia) Stanislava Konstantinova	(Russia) Serafima Sakhanovich	(United States) Bradie Tennell	Details
(Croatia) Golden Spin of Zagreb	(Italy) Carolina Kostner	(Russia) Elizaveta Tuktamysheva	(Russia) Alena Leonova	Details

=== Pairs ===
Competition	Gold	Silver	Bronze	Results
(Italy) Lombardia Trophy	(Italy) Nicole Della Monica / Matteo Guarise	(Italy) Valentina Marchei / Ondřej Hotárek	(Italy) Rebecca Ghilardi / Filippo Ambrosini	Details
(United States) U.S. International Classic	(Canada) Brittany Jones / Joshua Reagan	(United States) Jessica Calalang / Zack Sidhu	(United States) Alexandria Shaughnessy / James Morgan	Details
(Germany) Nebelhorn Trophy	(Germany) Aliona Savchenko / Bruno Massot	(Canada) Lubov Ilyushechkina / Dylan Moscovitch	(Germany) Mari Vartmann / Ruben Blommaert	Details
(Canada) Autumn Classic International	(Canada) Julianne Séguin / Charlie Bilodeau	(France) Vanessa James / Morgan Ciprès	(United States) Marissa Castelli / Mervin Tran	Details
(Slovakia) Ondrej Nepela Memorial	(Russia) Evgenia Tarasova / Vladimir Morozov	(Russia) Yuko Kavaguti / Alexander Smirnov	(Russia) Natalja Zabijako / Alexander Enbert	Details
(Finland) Finlandia Trophy	(Canada) Meagan Duhamel / Eric Radford	(Russia) Kristina Astakhova / Alexei Rogonov	(Germany) Mari Vartmann / Ruben Blommaert	Details
(Poland) Warsaw Cup	(Italy) Valentina Marchei / Ondřej Hotárek	(United States) Chelsea Liu / Brian Johnson	(Germany) Minerva Fabienne Hase / Nolan Seegert	Details
(Estonia) Tallinn Trophy	(Russia) Alina Ustimkina / Nikita Volodin	(Russia) Alisa Efimova / Alexander Korovin	(Lithuania) Goda Butkutė / Nikita Ermolaev	Details
(Croatia) Golden Spin of Zagreb	(Italy) Nicole Della Monica / Matteo Guarise	(Russia) Kristina Astakhova / Alexei Rogonov	(United States) Ashley Cain / Timothy LeDuc	Details

=== Ice dance ===
Competition	Gold	Silver	Bronze	Results
(Italy) Lombardia Trophy	(Italy) Charlène Guignard / Marco Fabbri	(United Kingdom) Lilah Fear / Lewis Gibson	(Finland) Cecilia Törn / Jussiville Partanen	Details
(United States) U.S. International Classic	(United States) Madison Hubbell / Zachary Donohue	(Japan) Kana Muramoto / Chris Reed	(Canada) Alexandra Paul / Mitchell Islam	Details
(Germany) Nebelhorn Trophy	(Italy) Anna Cappellini / Luca Lanotte	(United States) Madison Chock / Evan Bates	(Canada) Piper Gilles / Paul Poirier	Details
(Canada) Autumn Classic International	(Canada) Tessa Virtue / Scott Moir	(United States) Kaitlin Hawayek / Jean-Luc Baker	(Denmark) Laurence Fournier Beaudry / Nikolaj Sørensen	Details
(Slovakia) Ondrej Nepela Memorial	(Russia) Ekaterina Bobrova / Dmitri Soloviev	(United States) Madison Chock / Evan Bates	(Russia) Tiffany Zahorski / Jonathan Guerreiro	Details
(Finland) Finlandia Trophy	(Russia) Alexandra Stepanova / Ivan Bukin	(United States) Madison Hubbell / Zachary Donohue	(Russia) Tiffany Zahorski / Jonathan Guerreiro	Details
(Poland) Warsaw Cup	(Russia) Ekaterina Bobrova / Dmitri Soloviev	(Russia) Tiffany Zahorski / Jonathan Guerreiro	(Slovakia) Lucie Mysliveckova / Lukas Csolley	Details
(Estonia) Tallinn Trophy	(Russia) Elena Ilinykh / Ruslan Zhiganshin	(Israel) Isabella Tobias / Ilia Tkachenko	(United States) Elliana Pogrebinsky / Alex Benoit	Details
(Croatia) Golden Spin of Zagreb	(Italy) Charlène Guignard / Marco Fabbri	(United States) Kaitlin Hawayek / Jean-Luc Baker	(Turkey) Alisa Agafonova / Alper Uçar	Details

== Medal standings ==
Rank	Nation	Gold	Silver	Bronze	Total
1	Russia (RUS)	11	11	8	30
2	Italy (ITA)	7	1	1	9
3	Canada (CAN)	5	4	4	13
4	Japan (JPN)	5	3	0	8
5	United States (USA)	4	9	13	26
6	Germany (GER)	2	0	3	5
7	Israel (ISR)	1	2	0	3
8	Sweden (SWE)	1	0	0	1
9	Australia (AUS)	0	1	0	1
9	Belgium (BEL)	0	1	0	1
9	France (FRA)	0	1	0	1
9	Great Britain (GBR)	0	1	0	1
9	South Korea (KOR)	0	1	0	1
9	Uzbekistan (UZB)	0	1	0	1
15	Denmark (DEN)	0	0	1	1
15	Finland (FIN)	0	0	1	1
15	Kazakhstan (KAZ)	0	0	1	1
15	Lithuania (LTU)	0	0	1	1
15	Slovakia (SVK)	0	0	1	1
15	Switzerland (SUI)	0	0	1	1
15	Turkey (TUR)	0	0	1	1
Totals (21 entries)		36	36	36	108

== Challenger Series rankings ==
The ISU Challenger Series rankings were formed by combining the two highest final scores of each skater or team.

=== Men's singles ===
No.	Skater	Nation	First event	Score	Second event	Score	Total score
1	Jason Brown	United States	Lombardia Trophy	256.49	U.S. International Classic	254.04	510.53
2	Alexander Petrov	Russia	Nebelhorn Trophy	232.21	Golden Spin of Zagreb	222.92	455.13
3	Max Aaron	United States	Lombardia Trophy	218.73	Autumn Classic International	226.13	444.86
4	Brendan Kerry	Australia	U.S. International Classic	222.40	Golden Spin of Zagreb	221.94	444.34
5	Jorik Hendrickx	Belgium	Nebelhorn Trophy	223.04	Finlandia Trophy	218.32	441.36

=== Ladies' singles ===
No.	Skater	Nation	First event	Score	Second event	Score	Total score
1	Elizaveta Tuktamysheva	Russia	Nebelhorn Trophy	185.93	Golden Spin of Zagreb	192.03	377.96
2	Mirai Nagasu	United States	Lombardia Trophy	176.86	Autumn Classic International	189.11	365.97
3	Mariah Bell	United States	U.S. International Classic	184.22	Tallinn Trophy	167.69	351.91
4	Alena Leonova	Russia	Ondrej Nepela Memorial	151.12	Golden Spin of Zagreb	191.39	342.51
5	Amber Glenn	United States	Nebelhorn Trophy	157.68	Golden Spin of Zagreb	183.60	341.28

=== Pairs ===
No.	Team	Nation	First event	Score	Second event	Score	Total score
1	Valentina Marchei / Ondřej Hotárek	Italy	Lombardia Trophy	179.56	Warsaw Cup	189.26	368.82
2	Nicole Della Monica / Matteo Guarise	Italy	Lombardia Trophy	185.18	Golden Spin of Zagreb	180.60	365.78
3	Kristina Astakhova / Alexei Rogonov	Russia	Finlandia Trophy	169.10	Golden Spin of Zagreb	180.44	349.54
4	Haven Denney / Brandon Frazier	United States	Ondrej Nepela Memorial	172.82	Golden Spin of Zagreb	161.63	334.45
5	Ashley Cain / Timothy LeDuc	United States	Finlandia Trophy	158.63	Golden Spin of Zagreb	172.18	330.81

=== Ice dance ===
No.	Team	Nation	First event	Score	Second event	Score	Total score
1	Ekaterina Bobrova / Dmitri Soloviev	Russia	Ondrej Nepela Memorial	178.84	Warsaw Cup	183.60	362.44
2	Madison Chock / Evan Bates	United States	Nebelhorn Trophy	179.18	Ondrej Nepela Memorial	170.92	350.10
3	Charlène Guignard / Marco Fabbri	Italy	Lombardia Trophy	162.12	Golden Spin of Zagreb	180.30	342.42
4	Zahorski / Jonathan Guerreiro	Russia	Ondrej Nepela Memorial	165.64	Warsaw Cup	173.02	338.66
5	Kaitlin Hawayek / Jean-Luc Baker	United States	Autumn Classic International	160.50	Golden Spin of Zagreb	177.36	337.86

== Top scores ==
=== Men's singles ===
Top 10 best scores in the men's combined total
No.	Skater	Nation	Score	Event
1	Yuzuru Hanyu	Japan	260.57	2016 Autumn Classic International
2	Shoma Uno	Japan	258.93	2016 Lombardia Trophy
3	Jason Brown	United States	256.49	2016 Lombardia Trophy
4	Nathan Chen	United States	256.44	2016 Finlandia Trophy
5	Takahito Mura	Japan	252.20	2016 U.S. International Classic
6	Patrick Chan	Canada	248.73	2016 Finlandia Trophy
7	Adam Rippon	United States	248.24	2016 U.S. International Classic
8	Sergei Voronov	Russia	237.42	2016 Ondrej Nepela Memorial
9	Alexander Petrov	Russia	232.21	2016 Nebelhorn Trophy
10	Misha Ge	Uzbekistan	230.55	2016 Autumn Classic International

=== Ladies' singles ===
Top 10 best scores in the ladies' combined total
No.	Skater	Nation	Score	Event
1	Satoko Miyahara	Japan	206.75	2016 U.S. International Classic
2	Carolina Kostner	Italy	196.23	2016 Golden Spin of Zagreb
3	Elizaveta Tuktamysheva	Russia	192.03	2016 Golden Spin of Zagreb
4	Alena Leonova	Russia	191.39	2016 Golden Spin of Zagreb
5	Maria Sotskova	Russia	189.96	2016 Ondrej Nepela Memorial
6	Mirai Nagasu	United States	189.11	2016 Autumn Classic International
7	Mai Mihara	Japan	189.03	2016 Nebelhorn Trophy
8	Kaetlyn Osmond	Canada	187.27	2016 Finlandia Trophy
9	Stanislava Konstantinova	Russia	186.97	2016 Tallinn Trophy
10	Mao Asada	Japan	186.16	2016 Finlandia Trophy

=== Pairs ===
Top 10 best scores in the pairs' combined total
No.	Team	Nation	Score	Event
1	Julianne Séguin / Charlie Bilodeau	Canada	208.30	2016 Autumn Classic International
2	Aliona Savchenko / Bruno Massot	Germany	203.04	2016 Nebelhorn Trophy
3	Vanessa James / Morgan Ciprès	France	198.90	2016 Autumn Classic International
4	Evgenia Tarasova / Vladimir Morozov	Russia	197.80	2016 Ondrej Nepela Memorial
5	Meagan Duhamel / Eric Radford	Canada	197.78	2016 Finlandia Trophy
6	Valentina Marchei / Ondřej Hotárek	Italy	189.26	2016 Warsaw Cup
7	Yuko Kavaguti / Alexander Smirnov	Russia	185.42	2016 Ondrej Nepela Memorial
8	Nicole Della Monica / Matteo Guarise	Italy	185.18	2016 Lombardia Trophy
9	Lubov Ilyushechkina / Dylan Moscovitch	Canada	184.40	2016 Nebelhorn Trophy
10	Natalja Zabijako / Alexander Enbert	Russia	181.38	2016 Ondrej Nepela Memorial

=== Ice dance ===
Top 10 best scores in the combined total (ice dance)
No.	Team	Nation	Score	Event
1	Tessa Virtue / Scott Moir	Canada	189.20	2016 Autumn Classic International
2	Elena Ilinykh / Ruslan Zhiganshin	Russia	185.19	2016 Tallinn Trophy
3	Ekaterina Bobrova / Dmitri Soloviev	Russia	183.60	2016 Warsaw Cup
4	Anna Cappellini / Luca Lanotte	Italy	180.50	2016 Nebelhorn Trophy
5	Charlène Guignard / Marco Fabbri	Italy	180.30	2016 Golden Spin of Zagreb
6	Madison Chock / Evan Bates	United States	179.18	2016 Nebelhorn Trophy
7	Isabella Tobias / Ilia Tkachenko	Israel	177.80	2016 Tallinn Trophy
8	Kaitlin Hawayek / Jean-Luc Baker	United States	177.36	2016 Golden Spin of Zagreb
9	Piper Gilles / Paul Poirier	Canada	176.84	2016 Nebelhorn Trophy
10	Tiffany Zahorski / Jonathan Guerreiro	Russia	173.02	2016 Warsaw Cup
