= Mariah Bell =

American figure skater (born 1996)

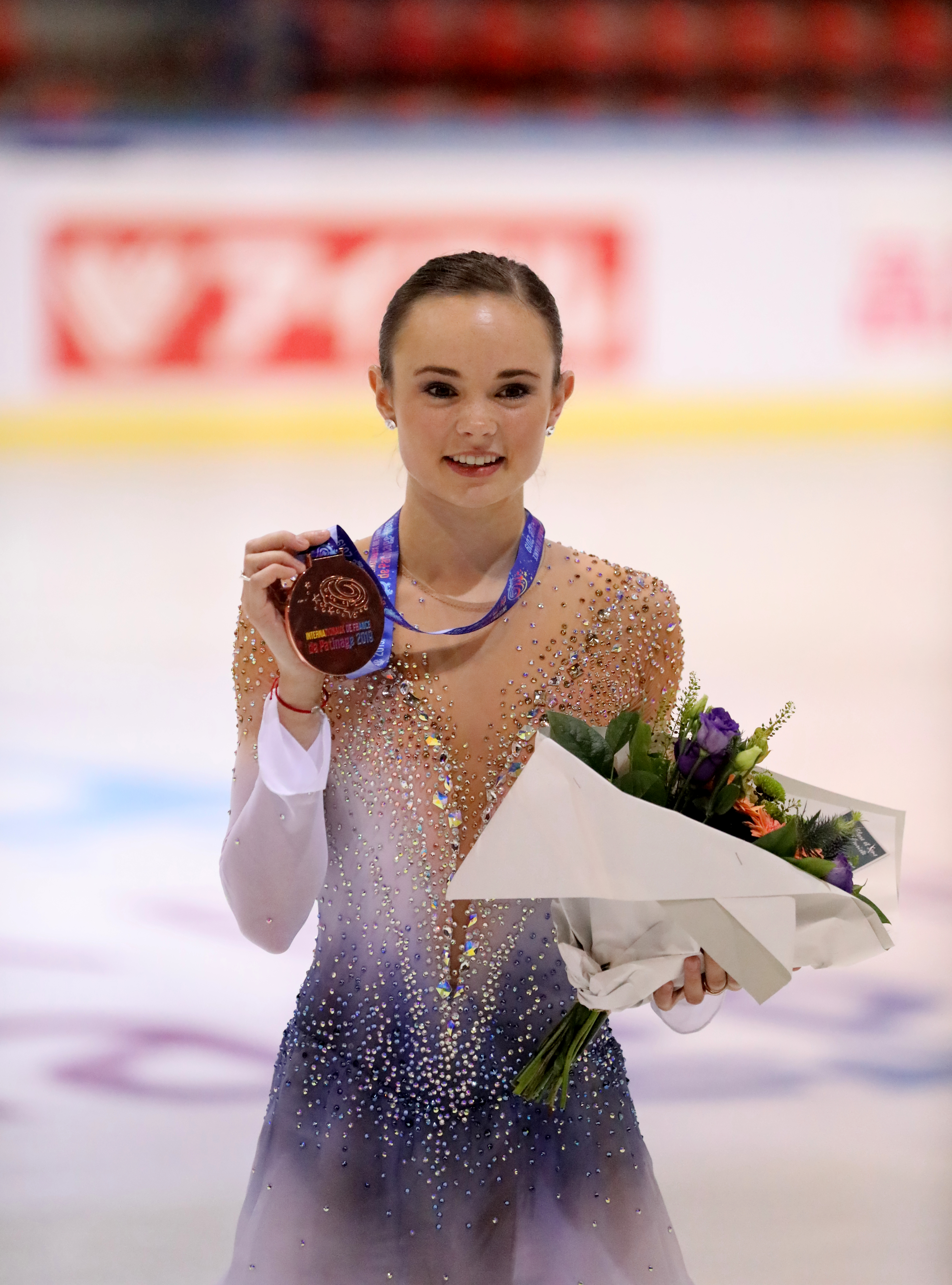
- Bell at the 2019 Internationaux de France medal ceremony

Personal information
- Full name: Mariah Cheyenne Bell
- Born: April 18, 1996 (age 30) Tulsa, Oklahoma, U.S.
- Home town: Westminster, Colorado, U.S.
- Height: 5 ft 4 in (163 cm)

Figure skating career
- Country: United States
- Discipline: Women's singles
- Began skating: 1999
- Competitive: 2011–2022
- Retired: October 12, 2022
Medal record
U.S. Championships
Gold medal – first place	2022 Nashville	Singles
Silver medal – second place	2020 Greensboro	Singles
Bronze medal – third place	2017 Kansas City	Singles
Bronze medal – third place	2019 Detroit	Singles
World Team Trophy
Gold medal – first place	2019 Fukuoka	Team

Mariah Cheyenne Bell (born April 18, 1996) is an American former competitive figure skater. She is the 2022 U.S. national champion, 2020 U.S. national silver medalist, and two-time U.S. national bronze medalist (2017, 2019). She is also the 2020 Skate America gold medalist, 2016 Skate America silver medalist, the 2019 Internationaux de France bronze medalist, the 2019 Rostelecom Cup bronze medalist, the 2019 CS Nebelhorn Trophy champion, and the 2016 CS U.S. International Classic silver medalist.

Bell finished within the top six at four ISU Championships, with her best result being fourth place at the 2022 World Figure Skating Championships and represented the United States at the 2022 Winter Olympics.

== Personal life ==
Mariah Bell was born on April 18, 1996, in Tulsa, Oklahoma. She is the second child of Kendra and Andy Bell. Her older sister, Morgan, has skated with Disney on Ice.

At age 12, Bell moved with her mother and sister from Houston to Westminster, Colorado. She graduated from Ralston Valley High School in 2014, and was named the school's Super Senior.

== Career ==
=== Early years ===
Bell began skating at the age of four because of her sister. Early in her career; she was coached by Megan Faulkner, Billy Schneider, and Candy Brown. At age 12, she joined Cindy Sullivan in Westminster, Colorado, at the Rocky Mountain FSC.

Bell finished fifth in the junior division at the 2012 U.S. Championships. She was assigned to the 2012 Gardena Spring Trophy and won the junior silver medal.

Bell won the silver medal in the junior division of the 2013 U.S. Championships, behind Polina Edmunds.

=== 2013–14 season ===
During the 2013–14 season, Bell was coached by Cindy Sullivan in Westminster, Colorado. Making her ISU Junior Grand Prix debut, she won a bronze medal in Mexico and finished seventh in Poland. At the 2014 U.S. Championships, Bell finished thirteenth. Soon after her high school graduation in 2014, she moved to Monument, Colorado so that she could train under Kori Ade.

=== 2014–15 season ===
Bell's senior international debut came in the 2014–15 season. She competed at two ISU Challenger Series events, the 2014 Nebelhorn Trophy where she finished fifth, and the 2014 Golden Spin of Zagreb where she placed eighth. She finished sixth at the 2015 U.S. Championships, having ranked twelfth in the short program and 6th in the free skate.

=== 2015–16 season ===
In 2015–16, Bell started her season on the ISU Challenger Series (CS), placing sixth at the 2015 U.S. International Classic and 13th at the 2015 Ondrej Nepela Trophy.

Making her Grand Prix debut, Bell finished 8th at 2015 Skate America, scoring personal bests in the free skate and combined total score. She placed eleventh at the 2016 U.S. Championships.

=== 2016–17 season ===
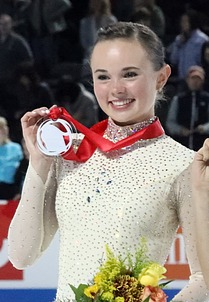
Bell at the 2016 Skate America medal ceremony

Bell changed coaches in August 2016, joining Rafael Arutyunyan in Lakewood, California. She landed on the podium at two of her 2016–17 ISU Challenger Series assignments. Ranked second in both segments, she took silver at the 2016 CS U.S. International Classic, behind Satoko Miyahara. At the 2016 CS Ondrej Nepela Memorial, she placed fifth in the short, fourth in the free, and third overall behind Maria Sotskova and Yulia Lipnitskaya. She was invited to the 2016 Skate America to replace the injured Angela Wang. She won the silver medal behind Ashley Wagner after placing sixth in the short program and first in the free skate.

In January 2017, Bell received the bronze medal at the U.S. Championships, earning her a spot on the Four Continents and World teams. In February, she placed sixth at the 2017 Four Continents Championships in Gangneung, South Korea. She later placed twelfth at her first trip to the 2017 World Championships in Helsinki, Finland.

=== 2017–18 season ===
Bell began her season placing fifth at the U.S. International Figure Skating Classic behind teammates Mirai Nagasu and Karen Chen and was assigned to the Rostelecom Cup and the NHK Trophy on the 2017–18 ISU Grand Prix of Figure Skating circuit.

After a sixth-place finish at the 2017 Rostelecom Cup, Bell placed ninth at the 2017 NHK Trophy.

Bell was named as the second alternate to the 2018 Winter Olympics team after placing fifth at the 2018 U.S. Figure Skating Championships in San Jose. On the withdrawal of Karen Chen, she was named to the 2018 World Figure Skating Championships team and placed twelfth.

=== 2018–19 season ===
Bell began the season at 2018 CS Nebelhorn Trophy, where she placed fourth overall with a score of 188.97. She was invited to 2018 Skate Canada International, where she placed fourth with a score of 190.25. In November, at 2018 NHK Trophy, she placed fifth overall with a score of 198.96, the highest in her career. She won the bronze medal at the 2018 CS Golden Spin after placing fourth in the short program and third in the free program, earning 196.60 points.

At the 2019 U.S. Championships, Bell underrotated the second part of her combination and placed third in the short program, behind Bradie Tennell and Alysa Liu. She placed second in the free skate, behind Liu, winning the bronze medal overall, the second of her career. Because the 13-year-old Liu was ineligible for senior (or even junior) international competition, Bell joined silver medalist Tennell on the American team for the 2019 World Championships, as well as the 2019 Four Continents Championships.

Bell placed third in the short program at Four Continents, setting a new personal best and winning a bronze small medal. The free skate proved to be less successful, with a fall on a triple loop jump and a doubled Lutz, and she fell to sixth overall.

Bell finished ninth at the 2019 World Figure Skating Championships with a career-best total score of 208.07. Bell's attendance at the World Championships became enmeshed in controversy when she was accused of deliberately causing an on-ice incident in which the blade of her free leg hit South Korean skater Lim Eun-soo during a practice session, causing a cut on Lim's calf. Lim's agency, All That Sports, stated to Agence-France Presse that the incident had been intentional and part of a pattern of bullying by Bell. Upon request from the Korean Skating Federation, the International Skating Union conducted an investigation. On March 21, the ISU stated that it found no evidence that Bell had sought to injure Lim intentionally. Rafael Arutyunyan, who coached both Bell and Lim, denied the allegations: "The thing is that Mariah’s program includes an element where she lays her leg back and stretches it. This is how it happened that she touched Lim’s leg with her blade. Of course, it was not deliberately! There has never been any confrontation between them at training sessions." Bell later said: "The whole experience was really bizarre, and it just felt like I was drowning in this nightmare of completely false information that was put out there that I couldn't do anything about."

Bell concluded her season as part of the gold medal-winning Team USA at the 2019 World Team Trophy.

=== 2019–20 season ===
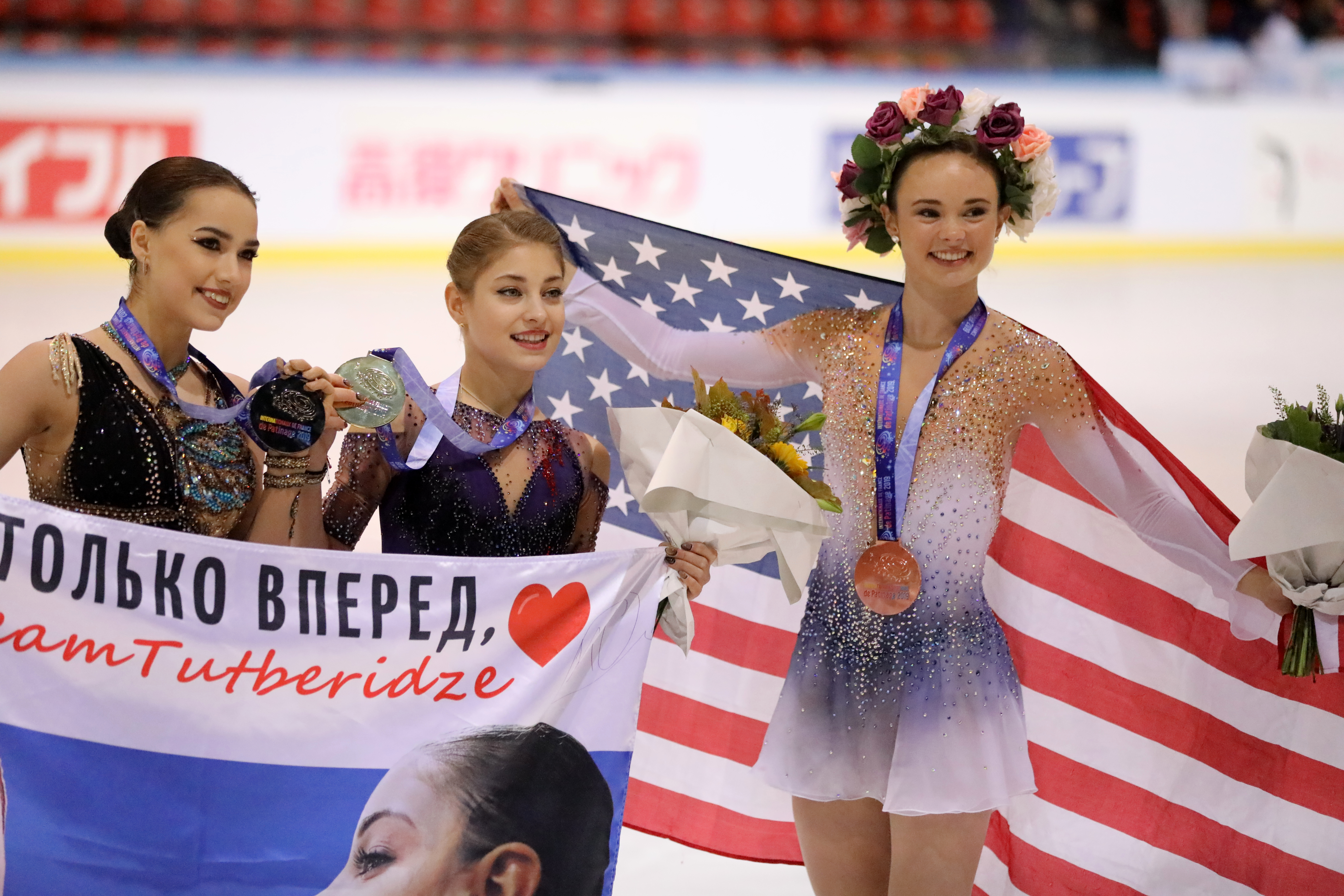
Bell (right) with Alina Zagitova (left) and Alena Kostornaia (middle) at the 2019 Internationaux de France medal ceremony

Having already had Adam Rippon collaborate as a choreographer the previous season, Bell added Rippon as part of her coaching team in addition to having him again choreograph her short program, this time to Britney Spears music on Rippon's recommendation. Starting her season on the Challenger series at the 2019 CS Nebelhorn Trophy, Bell placed first in both segments to win the event, her first international gold medal.

For her first Grand Prix assignment, Bell competed at the 2019 Internationaux de France, placing third in the short program with only an unclear edge warning on her triple flip. In the free skate, Bell underrotated a triple Lutz but otherwise landed all jumps cleanly and placed second in the segment, edging out reigning World and Olympic champion Alina Zagitova. She was third overall, behind Alena Kostornaia and Zagitova, taking her second Grand Prix medal. Bell said she was "proud of how this competition went." Competing next at the 2019 Rostelecom Cup, Bell placed third in the short program despite falling on her jump combination. She was also third in the free skate, winning another bronze medal.

Bell placed third in the short program at the 2020 U.S. Championships when, after landing her jumps successfully, she fell in her step sequence. She remarked after, "today, maybe I felt a little too good." Placing second in the free skate with no errors other than an underrotated triple Lutz, Bell won the silver medal and was the highest-finishing medalist eligible for senior international competition, the gold medal going again to Alysa Liu. Her free skate received a standing ovation, which she called "a very special feeling. I hadn’t had that before in my career." Bell subsequently eschewed attending the Four Continents Championships in Seoul, looking ahead to the 2020 World Championships in Montreal, but these events were canceled as a result of the coronavirus pandemic.

=== 2020–21 season ===
After spending months off the ice in the midst of the pandemic, Bell resumed training in June 2020, stating that she hoped to use the time to work on developing a triple Axel, which she described as having "always been something that I believe that I can do." She competed at the first opportunity of the ISP Points Challenge, a virtual U.S. domestic competition, winning both segments of the competition, despite only doing one jump combination in the free skate. It was announced that she would be a virtual guest skater at the Japan Open.

Bell was assigned to compete at the 2020 Skate America event on the Grand Prix circuit, the ISU having made assignments based on training location due to the pandemic. Bell won the short program with a clean skate, more than three points ahead of Bradie Tennell in second place. This would prove decisive, as she placed fourth in the free skate after falling on an underrotated triple Lutz and only attempting six triple jumps, but her short program score was sufficient to retain the overall lead and win her first Grand Prix gold medal.

Bell's success at Skate America and the prior season's national championships lead many to identify her as the favorite going into the 2021 U.S. Championships, particularly with defending champion Liu struggling with growth-related jumping limitations. She unexpectedly placed third in the short program after underrotating her triple Lutz and called it a disappointment. Bell struggled in the free skate, falling on a triple flip and making several other jump errors; as a result, she placed fifth in that segment and dropped to fifth place overall.

=== 2021–22 season ===
Heading into the Olympic season, Bell prepared new programs for the occasion. For the short program, she recruited RuPaul's Drag Race contestant Cordero Zuckerman to work with Adam Rippon on a stylistic homage to vogue set to the music of Lady Gaga. Her free skate to Joni Mitchell's "Both Sides Now", music Bell had considered using before, was meant to reflect the highs and lows of her career: "Skating to 'Hallelujah' at nationals was an incredible feeling — but I can still know what it was like the following year, to get off the ice and see myself in fifth." However, following her bronze medal showing at the Skating Club of Boston's Cranberry Cup international event and feedback from American officials, she subsequently dropped both programs, reviving her "Hallelujah" program and creating a new short program.

Bell's two Grand Prix assignments were the final two events of the series, starting with the 2021 Internationaux de France, where she placed sixth. She was tenth in the short program and fourth in the free skate. At her second event the following week, the 2021 Rostelecom Cup, Bell was third in the short program despite not landing a triple-triple combination, dropping to fourth after the free skate. She said, "technical content is a little bit lower right now, but I plan to put the triple-triple back in later during the season."

Bell entered the 2022 U.S. Championships as a contender for both the title and the American Olympic team. Frequent rival Bradie Tennell withdrew in advance due to injury. Bell won the short program, narrowly ahead of Karen Chen, while Alysa Liu was further back in third and withdrew before the free skate due to testing positive for COVID-19. Bell won the free skate as well, taking her first national title. The following day, she was named to the Olympic team, along with Chen and Liu. At 25, Bell became the oldest U.S. women's champion since Beatrix Loughran in 1927, and also the oldest American women's singles skater sent to the Olympics since Loughran in 1928.

Competing at the 2022 Winter Olympics in the women's event, Bell fell on her opening triple-triple combination attempt but nevertheless qualified for the free skate in eleventh position. She moved up one place in the free skate to finish tenth overall.

Days after the Olympics concluded, Vladimir Putin ordered an invasion of Ukraine, as a result of which the International Skating Union banned all Russian and Belarusian skaters from competing at the 2022 World Championships. This had a major impact on the women's field, dominated by Russians for most of the preceding eight years, and Bell entered the event as a podium contender. She finished third in the short program with a new personal best score of 72.55, taking a bronze small medal, the first for an American at the World Championships since Ashley Wagner in 2016. In the free skate, Bell struggled on both of her triple Lutzes in the second half of the program, underrotating one of them. She dropped from third to fourth overall, behind Liu.

==== Retirement ====
On October 12, 2022, Bell announced on Instagram that she was retiring from competitive figure skating and said she would continue performing at ice shows. She participated in the Japan Open later that fall, finishing sixth among the six female competitors and winning silver with Team North America.

== Programs ==
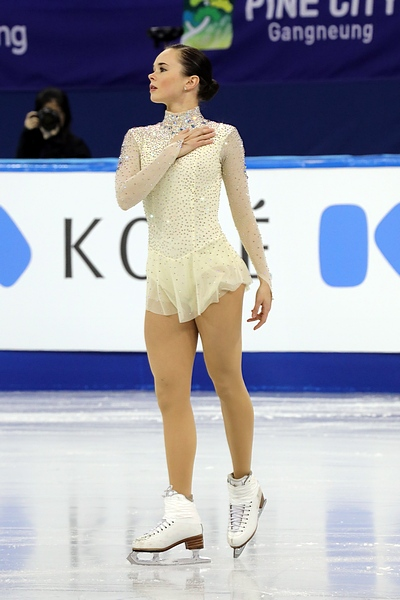
Bell at the 2017 Four Continents Championships

Program Notes

- Program details mentioned at first occurrence
- Olympic seasons highlighted in blue
- Programs performed at the Winter Olympics highlighted in **bold**

Competition and exhibition programs by season
Season	Short program	Free skate program	Exhibition program
2010–11	East of Eden: Composed by Leonard Rosenman; Choreo. by Scott Brown	Cats: Composed by Andrew Lloyd Webber; Choreo. by Scott Brown	—N/a
2011–12	Mack and Mabel: Composed by Jerry Herman; Choreo. by Cindy Stuart	Nausicaä of the Valley of the Wind: Composed by Joe Hisaishi; Choreo. by Cindy Stuart	"Andante sostenuto": From Scottish Fantasy; Composed by Max Bruch; Performed by Vanessa-Mae
2012–13	"I'm a Doun": Performed by Vanessa-Mae; Choreo. by Cindy Stuart	West Side Story Melody: From West Side Story; Performed by Joshua Bell; Choreo. by Cindy Stuart	—N/a
2013–14	Medley: 1. Bésame Mucho; Composed by Consuelo Velázquez; 2. Malagueña; Composed by Ernesto Lecuona; Choreo. by Cindy Stuart	Titanic: Composed by James Horner; Choreo. by Cindy Stuart	On Golden Pond: Composed by Dave Grusin
2014–15	"Little Talks": Performed by Kurt Hugo Schneider; Choreo. by Cindy Stuart	Titanic	—N/a
2015–16	"Storm Cry": Composed by David Arkenstone; Choreo. by Cindy Stuart	Born on the Fourth of July: Composed by John Williams; Choreo. by Rohene Ward	—N/a
2016–17	Chicago: 1. "Roxie"; Performed by Renée Zellweger; 2. "All That Jazz"; Composed by John Kander; Choreo. by Rohene Ward	East of Eden: Composed by Leonard Rosenman; Choreo. by Rohene Ward	"Rise Up": Performed by Andra Day
2017–18	Chicago	West Side Story: Composed by Leonard Bernstein	"Rise Up"
2017–18	"Across the Universe": Performed by the Beatles	West Side Story	"Rise Up"
2018–19	"To Love You More": Performed by Celine Dion; Choreo. by Adam Rippon	"Experience": Composed by Ludovico Einaudi; Performed by Angèle Dubeau; Choreo. by Shae-Lynn Bourne	"Stand By Me": Performed by Florence + the Machine
2019–20	Britney Spears medley: 1. "Radar"; 2. "Work Bitch"; Performed by Britney Spears; Choreo. by Adam Rippon	"Hallelujah": Performed by k.d. lang; Choreo. by Shae-Lynn Bourne	"Always Remember Us This Way": From A Star Is Born; Performed by Lady Gaga
2020–21	"Glitter in the Air": Performed by Pink; Choreo. by Adam Rippon	ABBA medley: 1. "The Winner Takes It All"; 2. "Mamma Mia"; 3. "Thank You for the Music"; Performed by ABBA; Choreo. by Shae-Lynn Bourne	—N/a
2021–22	Lady Gaga medley: 1. "Chromatica II"; 2. "911"; 3. Rain on Me; Choreo. by Adam Rippon and Cordero Zuckerman	"Both Sides, Now": Performed by Joni Mitchell; Choreo. by Shae-Lynn Bourne	Shania Twain medley: Performed by Shania Twain; Choreo. by Morgan Bell
2021–22	**"River Flows in You"**: Composed by Yiruma; Choreo. by Adam Rippon and Molly Oberstar	**"Hallelujah"**	Lady Gaga medley

== Competitive highlights ==
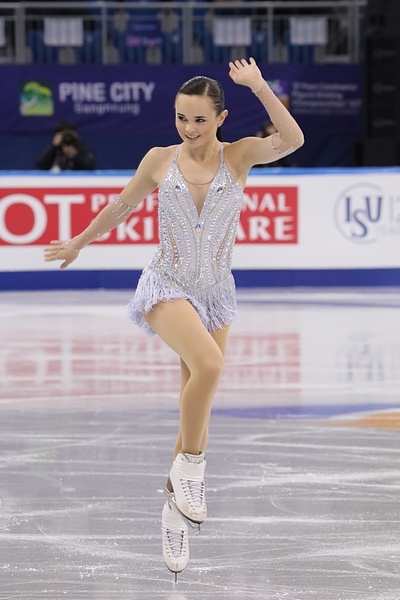
Bell at the 2017 Four Continents Championships

- GP – Event of the ISU Grand Prix Series
- JGP – Event of the ISU Junior Grand Prix Series
- CS – Event of the ISU Challenger Series
- C – Cancelled event, WD – Withdrawal
- Medals at team events are awarded for the team results only. Individual placements at team events are listed in parentheses.

Competition placements at senior level
Season	2013–14	2014–15	2015–16	2016–17	2017–18	2018–19	2019–20	2020–21	2021–22	2022–23	2023–24
Winter Olympics									9th		
World Championships				12th	12th	9th	C		4th		
Four Continents Championships				6th	5th	6th					
U.S. Championships	13th	6th	11th	3rd	5th	3rd	2nd	5th	1st		
GP France							3rd		6th		
GP NHK Trophy					9th	5th					
GP Rostelecom Cup					6th		3rd		4th		
GP Skate America			8th	2nd				1st			
GP Skate Canada						4th					
CS Golden Spin of Zagreb		8th				3rd			WD		
CS Nebelhorn Trophy		5th				4th	1st				
CS Ondrej Nepela Memorial			13th	3rd							
CS Tallinn Trophy				4th							
CS U.S. Classic			6th	2nd	5th						
CS Asian Open									WD		
Cranberry Cup									3rd		
World Team Trophy						1st (6th)					
Japan Open										2nd (3rd)	2nd (6th)

Competition placements at junior level
Season	2011–12	2012–13	2013–14
U.S. Championships	5th	2nd	
JGP Mexico			3rd
JGP Poland			7th
Gardena Trophy		2nd	

== Detailed results ==
- TSS – Total segment score highlighted in **bold**
- TES – Technical element score
- PCS – Program component score

ISU personal best scores in the +5/-5 GOE System
Segment	Type	Score	Event
Total	**TSS**	**212.89**	2019 Internationaux de France
Short program	**TSS**	**72.55**	2022 World Championships
Short program	TES	39.18	2018 CS Nebelhorn Trophy
Short program	PCS	33.88	2022 World Championships
Free skating	**TSS**	**142.64**	2019 Internationaux de France
Free skating	TES	73.39	2019 Internationaux de France
Free skating	PCS	69.83	2022 World Championships

ISU personal best scores in the +3/-3 GOE System
Segment	Type	Score	Event
Total	**TSS**	**191.59**	2016 Skate America
Short program	**TSS**	**63.85**	2017 Rostelecom Cup
Short program	TES	34.90	2018 Four Continents Championships
Short program	PCS	30.54	2018 World Championships
Free skating	**TSS**	**130.67**	2016 Skate America
Free skating	TES	66.22	2016 Skate America
Free skating	PCS	64.45	2016 Skate America

=== Senior level ===
- Small medals for the short program and free skating are only awarded at ISU Championships.
- Medals at team events are awarded for the team results only. Individual placements at team events are listed in parentheses.

Results in the 2013–14 season
Date	Event	SP		FS		Total	
Date	Event	P	Score	P	Score	P	Score
Jan 5–12, 2014	(United States) 2014 U.S. Championships	9	56.72	15	92.72	13	149.44

Results in the 2014–15 season
Date	Event	SP		FS		Total	
Date	Event	P	Score	P	Score	P	Score
Sep 25–27, 2014	(Germany) 2014 CS Nebelhorn Trophy	6	50.72	4	97.76	5	148.48
Dec 4–6, 2014	(Croatia) 2014 CS Golden Spin of Zagreb	8	51.08	7	93.72	8	144.80
Jan 18–25, 2015	(United States) 2015 U.S. Championships	12	57.35	6	122.90	6	180.25

Results in the 2015–16 season
Date	Event	SP		FS		Total	
Date	Event	P	Score	P	Score	P	Score
Sep 16–20, 2015	(United States) 2015 CS U.S. Classic	6	55.03	6	94.44	6	149.47
Oct 1–3, 2015	(Slovakia) 2015 CS Ondrej Nepela Trophy	13	43.93	13	91.50	13	135.43
Oct 23–25, 2015	(United States) 2015 Skate America	11	52.73	8	108.21	8	160.94
Jan 15–23, 2016	(United States) 2016 U.S. Championships	6	58.85	11	101.18	11	160.03

Results in the 2016–17 season
Date	Event	SP		FS		Total	
Date	Event	P	Score	P	Score	P	Score
Sep 14–18, 2016	(United States) 2016 CS U.S. Classic	2	60.64	2	123.58	2	184.22
Sep 28–Oct 2, 2016	(Slovakia) 2016 CS Ondrej Nepela Memorial	5	56.58	4	105.14	3	161.72
Oct 21–23, 2016	(United States) 2016 Skate America	6	60.92	1	130.67	2	191.59
Nov 20–27, 2016	(Estonia) 2016 CS Tallinn Trophy	6	55.92	4	111.77	4	167.69
Jan 14–22, 2017	(United States) 2017 U.S. Championships	6	63.33	3	134.59	3	197.92
Feb 15–19, 2017	(South Korea) 2017 Four Continents Championships	7	61.21	7	115.89	6	177.10
Mar 29–Apr 2, 2017	(Finland) 2017 World Championships	13	61.02	9	126.21	12	187.23

Results in the 2017–18 season
Date	Event	SP		FS		Total	
Date	Event	P	Score	P	Score	P	Score
Sep 13–17, 2017	(United States) 2017 CS U.S. Classic	4	60.68	5	107.98	5	168.66
Oct 20–22, 2017	(Russia) 2017 Rostelecom Cup	7	63.85	6	124.71	6	188.56
Nov 10–12, 2017	(Japan) 2017 NHK Trophy	9	57.75	10	108.79	9	166.04
Jan 3–5, 2018	(United States) 2018 U.S. Championships	6	65.18	6	127.16	5	192.34
Jan 22–28, 2018	(Taiwan) 2018 Four Continents Championships	4	62.90	5	122.94	5	185.84
Mar 21–23, 2018	(Italy) 2018 World Championships	17	59.15	12	115.25	12	174.40

Results in the 2018–19 season
Date	Event	SP		FS		Total	
Date	Event	P	Score	P	Score	P	Score
Sep 26–29, 2018	(Germany) 2018 CS Nebelhorn Trophy	4	70.02	6	118.95	4	188.97
Oct 26–28, 2018	2018 Skate Canada International	5	63.35	4	126.90	4	190.25
Nov 9–11, 2018	(Japan) 2018 NHK Trophy	7	62.97	4	135.99	5	198.96
Dec 5–8, 2018	(Croatia) 2018 CS Golden Spin of Zagreb	4	67.82	3	128.78	3	196.60
Jan 18–27, 2019	(United States) 2019 U.S. Championships	3	70.30	2	142.10	3	212.40
Feb 7–10, 2019	(United States) 2019 Four Continents Championships	3	70.02	6	123.92	6	193.94
Mar 18–24, 2019	(Japan) 2019 World Championships	6	71.26	9	136.81	9	208.07
Apr 11–14, 2019	(Japan) 2019 World Team Trophy	5	70.89	6	135.17	1 (6)	206.06

Results in the 2019–20 season
Date	Event	SP		FS		Total	
Date	Event	P	Score	P	Score	P	Score
Sep 25–28, 2019	(Germany) 2019 CS Nebelhorn Trophy	1	68.45	1	136.68	1	205.13
Nov 1–3, 2019	2019 Internationaux de France	3	70.25	2	142.64	3	212.89
Nov 15–17, 2019	(Russia) 2019 Rostelecom Cup	3	67.11	3	138.56	3	205.67
Jan 20–26, 2020	(United States) 2020 U.S. Championships	3	73.22	2	151.99	2	225.21

Results in the 2020–21 season
Date	Event	SP		FS		Total	
Date	Event	P	Score	P	Score	P	Score
Oct 23–24, 2020	(United States) 2020 Skate America	1	76.48	4	136.25	1	212.73
Jan 11–21, 2021	(United States) 2021 U.S. Championships	3	72.37	5	127.38	5	199.95

Results in the 2021–22 season
Date	Event	SP		FS		Total	
Date	Event	P	Score	P	Score	P	Score
Aug 11–15, 2021	(United States) 2021 Cranberry Cup International	2	67.07	5	112.35	3	179.42
Nov 19–21, 2021	2021 Internationaux de France	10	60.81	4	129.98	6	190.79
Nov 26–28, 2021	(Russia) 2021 Rostelecom Cup	3	69.37	4	140.98	4	210.35
Jan 3–9, 2022	(United States) 2022 U.S. Championships	1	75.55	1	140.70	1	216.25
Feb 15–17, 2022	(China) 2022 Winter Olympics	10	65.38	7	136.92	9	202.30
Mar 21–27, 2022	(France) 2022 World Championships	3	72.55	4	136.11	4	208.66

Results in the 2022–23 season
Date	Event	SP		FS		Total	
Date	Event	P	Score	P	Score	P	Score
Oct 8, 2022	2022 Japan Open	–	–	3	119.40	2	–

Results in the 2023–24 season
Date	Event	SP		FS		Total	
Date	Event	P	Score	P	Score	P	Score
Oct 7, 2023	2023 Japan Open	–	–	6	103.95	2	–

=== Junior level ===
Results in the 2011–12 season
Date	Event	SP		FS		Total	
Date	Event	P	Score	P	Score	P	Score
Jan 22–29, 2012	(United States) 2012 U.S. Championships (Junior)	6	46.75	5	90.15	5	136.90
Apr 13–15, 2012	(Italy) Gardena Trophy	2	39.45	2	77.01	2	116.46

Results in the 2012–13 season
Date	Event	SP		FS		Total	
Date	Event	P	Score	P	Score	P	Score
Jan 19–27, 2013	(United States) 2013 U.S. Championships (Junior)	2	56.63	3	96.17	2	152.80

Results in the 2013–14 season
Date	Event	SP		FS		Total	
Date	Event	P	Score	P	Score	P	Score
Sep 5–7, 2013	2013 JGP Mexico	4	49.91	2	103.26	3	153.17
Sep 19–21, 2013	2013 JGP Poland	8	43.84	7	84.27	7	128.11
