= 2016 CS U.S. International Figure Skating Classic =

2016 CS U.S. International Classic
- Type: ISU Challenger Series
- Date: September 14 – 18
- Season: 2016–17
- Location: Salt Lake City, Utah, United States
- Venue: Salt Lake City Sports Complex

Champions
- Men's singles: (United States) Jason Brown
- Ladies' singles: (Japan) Satoko Miyahara
- Pairs: (Canada) Brittany Jones / Joshua Reagan
- Ice dance: (United States) Madison Hubbell / Zachary Donohue
- Previous: 2016 CS Lombardia Trophy
- Next: 2016 CS Nebelhorn Trophy

The 2016 CS U.S. International Figure Skating Classic was a senior international figure skating competition held in September 2016 in Salt Lake City, Utah. It was part of the 2016–17 ISU Challenger Series. Medals were awarded in the disciplines of men's singles, ladies' singles, pair skating, and ice dancing.

== Entries ==
The International Skating Union published the list of entries on August 31, 2016.

Country	Men	Ladies	Pairs	Ice dance
Armenia				Tina Garabedian / Simon Proulx-Sénécal
Australia	Andrew Dodds; Jordan Dodds; Brendan Kerry		Paris Stephens / Matthew Dodds	
Canada	Elladj Baldé; Mitchell Gordon; Nam Nguyen	Kim Decelles	Brittany Jones / Joshua Reagan	Alexandra Paul / Mitchell Islam; Mackenzie Bent / Dmitre Razgulajevs
Czech Republic				Cortney Mansour / Michal Češka
Finland	Bela Papp			
Germany				Katharina Müller / Tim Dieck
Greece		Dimitra Korri		
Israel		Aimee Buchanan		
Japan	Takahito Mura; Keiji Tanaka	Satoko Miyahara	Sumire Suto / Francis Boudreau-Audet	Kana Muramoto / Chris Reed
Kazakhstan		Elizabet Tursynbayeva		
South Korea		Choi Da-bin; Lee Seo-young		Yura Min / Alexander Gamelin
Spain				Olivia Smart / Adrià Díaz
Switzerland		Yasmine Kimiko Yamada		
Turkey				Alisa Agafonova / Alper Uçar
United States	Jason Brown; Ross Miner; Sean Rabbitt; Adam Rippon	Mariah Bell; Emily Chan; Karen Chen; Paige Rydberg	Jessica Calalang / Zack Sidhu; Alexandria Shaughnessy / James Morgan	Madison Hubbell / Zachary Donohue; Karina Manta / Joseph Johnson; Danielle Thomas / Daniel Eaton

Withdrew before starting orders were drawn

- Men: Yan Han (CHN), Michal Březina (CZE)
- Ladies: Anastasia Galustyan (ARM), Brooklee Han (AUS), Véronik Mallet (CAN), Maisy Hiu Ching Ma (HKG), Byun Ji-hyun (KOR), Michaela du Toit (RSA)
- Pairs: Kirsten Moore-Towers / Michael Marinaro (CAN), Kim Kyu-eun / Alex Kang-chan Kam (KOR)
- Ice dancing: Laurence Fournier Beaudry / Nikolaj Sørensen (DEN)

== Challenger Series results ==
=== Men ===
Jason Brown rose from second place after the short program to win the title, with Takahito Mura and Adam Rippon taking silver and bronze respectively.

Rank	Name	Nation	Total	SP		FS	
1	Jason Brown	United States	254.04	2	83.18	1	170.86
2	Takahito Mura	Japan	252.20	3	82.55	2	169.65
3	Adam Rippon	United States	248.24	1	87.86	3	160.38
4	Brendan Kerry	Australia	222.40	6	73.93	4	148.47
5	Nam Nguyen	Canada	220.55	5	74.08	5	146.47
6	Ross Miner	United States	214.48	8	71.37	6	143.11
7	Sean Rabbitt	United States	209.66	7	72.45	7	137.21
8	Elladj Baldé	Canada	207.94	4	74.32	8	133.62
9	Mitchell Gordon	Canada	200.17	9	67.25	9	132.92
10	Keiji Tanaka	Japan	185.98	11	61.85	10	124.13
11	Andrew Dodds	Australia	160.54	10	61.98	11	98.56
12	Jordan Dodds	Australia	139.44	13	48.18	12	91.26
13	Bela Papp	Finland	137.88	12	52.45	13	85.43

=== Ladies ===
Satoko Miyahara led the ladies short program with 70.09 points, followed by Mariah Bell with 60.64 points, and South Korea's Choi Da-bin with 58.70 points. In the free program, Miyahara held on to her lead and scored 136.66 points, while Bell kept her second position with 123.58 points. Karen Chen of the United States rose from sixth in the short program to third in the free skating with 110.58 points. Overall, Miyahara won with a combined score of 206.75, Bell second with 184.22, and Chen third with 162.08.

Choi Da-bin, third after the short, finished fourth overall with a free skate where she fell twice. She had a combined score of 152.99. The last two Americans Paige Rydberg and Emily Chan finished fifth and sixth, respectively.

Rank	Name	Nation	Total	SP		FS	
1	Satoko Miyahara	Japan	206.75	1	70.09	1	136.66
2	Mariah Bell	United States	184.22	2	60.64	2	123.58
3	Karen Chen	United States	162.08	6	51.50	3	110.58
4	Choi Da-bin	South Korea	152.99	3	58.70	5	94.29
5	Paige Rydberg	United States	149.35	5	52.53	4	96.82
6	Emily Chan	United States	139.43	4	54.22	6	85.21
7	Elizabet Tursynbaeva	Kazakhstan	127.06	8	48.33	9	78.73
8	Aimee Buchanan	Israel	122.52	10	37.82	7	84.70
9	Kim Decelles	Canada	120.41	7	48.37	10	72.04
10	Lee Seo Young	South Korea	118.08	9	38.95	8	79.13
11	Yasmine Kimiko Yamada	Switzerland	92.18	11	35.11	11	57.07
12	Dimitra Korri	Greece	91.31	12	24.97	12	56.34

=== Pairs ===
Second after the short program, Canada's Brittany Jones / Joshua Reagan overtook the United States' Jessica Calalang / Zack Sidhu for the gold medal.

Rank	Name	Nation	Total	SP		FS	
1	Brittany Jones / Joshua Reagan	Canada	155.48	2	55.64	1	99.84
2	Jessica Calalang / Zack Sidhu	United States	151.24	1	58.74	2	92.50
3	Alexandria Shaughnessy / James Morgan	United States	140.08	3	47.78	3	92.30
4	Sumire Suto / Francis Boudreau-Audet	Japan	122.64	4	44.48	4	78.16
5	Paris Stephens / Matthew Dodds	Australia	82.76	5	33.02	5	49.74

=== Ice dancing ===
Madison Hubbell / Zachary Donohue of the United States took gold after winning both segments of the competition. Silver medalists Kana Muramoto / Chris Reed of Japan received their first CS medal after placing second in both segments. Canada's Alexandra Paul / Mitchell Islam climbed from fifth to take the bronze medal.

Rank	Name	Nation	Total	SD		FD	
1	Madison Hubbell / Zachary Donohue	United States	166.90	1	64.82	1	102.08
2	Kana Muramoto / Chris Reed	Japan	151.18	2	61.10	2	90.08
3	Alexandra Paul / Mitchell Islam	Canada	141.20	5	53.94	3	87.26
4	Olivia Smart / Adrià Díaz	Spain	138.34	3	57.12	5	81.22
5	Karina Manta / Joseph Johnson	United States	137.76	6	53.60	4	84.16
6	Yura Min / Alexander Gamelin	South Korea	134.74	4	55.48	8	79.26
7	Alisa Agafonova / Alper Uçar	Turkey	131.76	7	52.08	7	79.68
8	Danielle Thomas / Daniel Eaton	United States	128.64	9	48.92	6	79.72
9	Tina Garabedian / Simon Proulx-Sénécal	Armenia	127.38	8	51.38	9	76.00
10	Cortney Mansour / Michal Češka	Czech Republic	120.20	11	46.22	10	65.88
11	Mackenzie Bent / Dmitre Razgulajevs	Canada	112.10	10	46.22	12	65.88
12	Katharina Müller / Tim Dieck	Germany	109.84	12	40.58	11	69.26
