= Brittany Jones =

Canadian pair skater

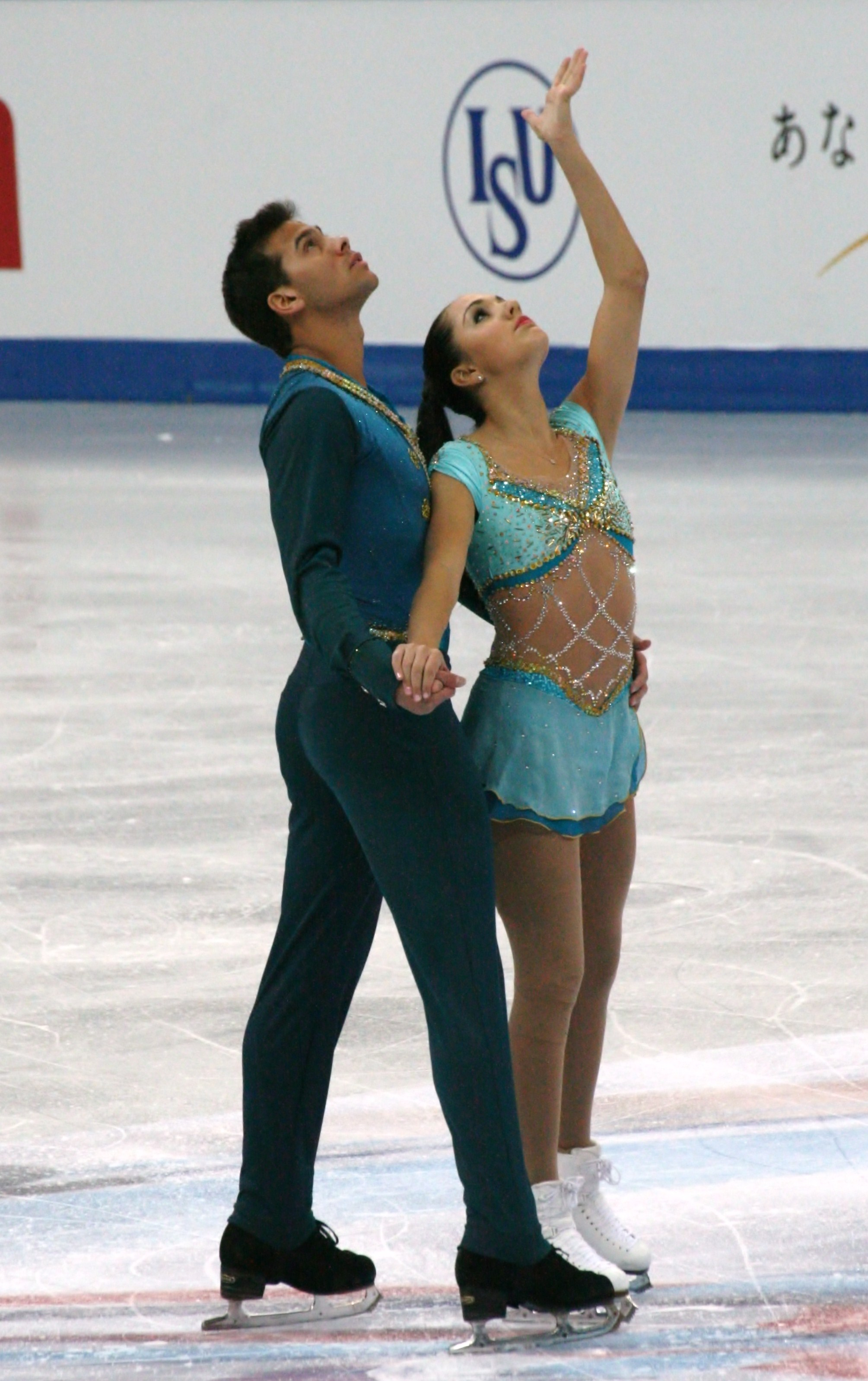
- Jones/Beharry in December 2012

Personal information
- Born: January 18, 1996 (age 30) Toronto, Ontario
- Height: 1.58 m (5 ft 2 in)

Figure skating career
- Country: Canada
- Partner: Joshua Reagan
- Coach: Bryce Davison
- Skating club: Kitchener Waterloo SC
- Began skating: 2004

Brittany Jones (born January 18, 1996) is a Canadian former pair skater. With Joshua Reagan, she is the 2016 U.S. International Classic champion. She finished in the top six at three World Junior Championships with earlier partners.

== Career ==
Jones teamed up with Kurtis Gaskell around 2008. They placed sixth at the 2011 World Junior Championships. They split after the 2012 Canadian Championships. Jones then had a one-year partnership with Ian Beharry. The two finished sixth at the 2013 World Junior Championships.

In October 2013, Jones was paired with U.S. skater Joshua Reagan by Kristy Wirtz and Kris Wirtz, who coached the pair in Kitchener-Waterloo, Ontario. Jones/Reagan decided to compete for Canada and placed seventh at the 2014 Canadian Championships. They changed coaches in spring 2015, moving to Bryce Davison.

Jones/Reagan won gold at the 2016 U.S. International Classic after placing second in the short and first in the free.

== Programs ==
=== With Reagan ===
Season	Short program	Free skating
2016–17	Under the Bridge by Red Hot Chili Peppers	Violin Fantasy on Puccini's Turandot by Vanessa-Mae; Nessun dorma performed by Josh Groban
2015–16	Come Together by The Beatles choreo. by Shawn Sawyer	Sentimental Journey; Stardust by Nat King Cole choreo. by David Wilson
2014–15	W.E. by Abel Korzeniowski choreo. by Mark Pillay	Young and Beautiful by Lana Del Rey choreo. by Mark Pillay
2013–14	Samba for You by Santana	Samson and Delilah by Camille Saint-Saëns

=== With Beharry ===
Season	Short program	Free skating
2012–13	Black Magic Woman by Santana; Bombay Dreams by Andrew Lloyd Webber	Winter and Summer (from Four Seasons) by Antonio Vivaldi

=== With Gaskell ===
Season	Short program	Free skating
2011–12	Music From a Farther Room by Paul Swartz; Nocturne; Bohemian Rhapsody performed by Lucia Micarelli	Tosca; Lucevan Le stelle (from Tosca) by Giacomo Puccini
2010–11	The Day Will Dawn by Richard Addinsell	My Fair Lady by Frederick Loewe
2009–10	The Ukraine	Toccata and Fugue by Johann Sebastian Bach; Winter; Spring by Antonio Vivaldi all performed by Vanessa-Mae

== Competitive highlights ==
GP: Grand Prix; CS: Challenger Series; JGP: Junior Grand Prix

=== Pair skating with Reagan ===
International
Event	13–14	14–15	15–16	16–17
GP Skate Canada		7th		7th
CS Autumn Classic		7th		
CS U.S. Classic		4th		1st
Autumn Classic			4th	
National
Canadian Champ.	7th	7th	6th	4th
SC Challenge	2nd			
TBD: Assigned

=== Pair skating with Beharry ===
International
Event	2012–13
World Junior Champ.	6th
JGP Final	6th
JGP Austria	1st
JGP Germany	3rd
National
Canadian Champ.	4th

=== Pair skating with Gaskell ===
International
Event	08–09	09–10	10–11	11–12
GP Cup of Russia				7th
International: Junior
World Junior Champ.		7th	6th	
JGP Final			6th	
JGP Austria			6th	
JGP Germany		8th	4th	
JGP Poland		3rd		
National
Canadian Champ.	1st J	9th	6th	7th
J: Junior level

=== Single skating ===
Event	2011–12
Canadian Championships	17th J
J: Junior level
