= 2016 CS Lombardia Trophy =

- Type: ISU Challenger Series
- Date: 8 – 11 September 2016
- Season: 2016–17
- Location: Bergamo, Italy

Champions
- Men's singles: (Japan) Shoma Uno
- Ladies' singles: (Japan) Wakaba Higuchi
- Pairs: (Italy) Nicole Della Monica / Matteo Guarise
- Ice dance: (Italy) Charlène Guignard / Marco Fabbri
- Next: 2016 CS U.S. Classic

The 2016 CS Lombardia Trophy was a senior international figure skating competition held in September 2016 in Bergamo, Italy. It was part of the 2016–17 ISU Challenger Series. Medals were awarded in the disciplines of men's singles, ladies' singles, pair skating, and ice dancing.

== Entries ==
With the exception of the host, each country is allowed to enter up to three entries per discipline. The International Skating Union published the entry lists on 11 August 2016:

| Country | Men | Ladies | Pairs | Ice dance |
|---|---|---|---|---|
| Bulgaria | | | | Mina Zdravkova / Christopher M. Davis |
| Czech Republic | | Anna Dušková | | |
| Estonia | | Helery Hälvin; Gerli Liinamäe | | |
| Finland | | Viveca Lindfors; Liubov Efimenko | | Cecilia Törn / Jussiville Partanen |
| France | Simon Hocquaux | | | |
| Germany | | Lutricia Bock; Nicole Schott; Nathalie Weinzierl | | |
| Hong Kong | Lap Kan Yuen | | | |
| Hungary | | Fruzsina Medgyesi | | |
| Ireland | Conor Stakelum | | | |
| Italy | Alessandro Fadini | Micol Cristini; Roberta Rodeghiero | Nicole Della Monica / Matteo Guarise; Rebecca Ghilardi / Filippo Ambrosini; Valentina Marchei / Ondřej Hotárek | Charlène Guignard / Marco Fabbri; Jasmine Tessari / Francesco Fioretti |
| Japan | Shoma Uno | Wakaba Higuchi; Kanako Murakami | | |
| Lithuania | | Aleksandra Golovkina | Goda Butkutė / Nikita Ermolaev | |
| Poland | | | | Justyna Plutowska / Jérémie Flemin |
| South Korea | Kim Jin-seo; Kyeong Jae-seok | Kim Na-hyun; Park Se-bin; Park So-youn | Ji Min-ji / Themistocles Leftheris | |
| Serbia | | Antonina Dubinina | | |
| Sweden | Ondrej Spiegl | | | |
| Switzerland | Stéphane Walker | Tanja Odermatt | | |
| United Kingdom | Graham Newberry | Kristen Spours | | Lilah Fear / Lewis Gibson |
| United States | Max Aaron; Jason Brown; Grant Hochstein | Mirai Nagasu | Jessica Pfund / Joshua Santillan | Julia Biechler / Damian Dodge |

Withdrew before starting orders were drawn

- Men: Valtter Virtanen (FIN), Kévin Aymoz (FRA), Alexander Bjelde (GER), Franz Streubel (GER), Simone Cervi (ITA), Ivan Righini (ITA), Matteo Rizzo (ITA), Davide Lewton Brain (MON)
- Ladies: Emilia Toikkanen (FIN), Léa Serna (FRA), Sara Casella (ITA), Daša Grm (SLO), Nicole Rajičová (SVK)
- Pairs: Marcelina Lech / Aritz Maestu (ESP)
- Ice dancing: Anna Cappellini / Luca Lanotte (ITA), Juulia Turkkila / Matthias Versluis (FIN), Kate Louise Bagnall / Benjamin Allain (FRA)

== Senior results ==
=== Men ===
| Rank | Name | Nation | Total | SP | | FS | |
|---|---|---|---|---|---|---|---|
| 1 | Shoma Uno | Japan | 258.93 | 1 | 86.68 | 2 | 172.25 |
| 2 | Jason Brown | United States | 256.49 | 2 | 81.58 | 1 | 174.91 |
| 3 | Max Aaron | United States | 218.73 | 3 | 72.93 | 3 | 145.80 |
| 4 | Stéphane Walker | Switzerland | 207.81 | 4 | 70.17 | 4 | 137.64 |
| 5 | Grant Hochstein | United States | 198.77 | 5 | 64.95 | 5 | 133.82 |
| 6 | Kim Jin-seo | South Korea | 184.58 | 6 | 62.33 | 6 | 122.25 |
| 7 | Graham Newberry | United Kingdom | 166.91 | 8 | 54.34 | 7 | 112.57 |
| 8 | Ondrej Spiegl | Sweden | 166.56 | 7 | 55.83 | 8 | 110.73 |
| 9 | Simon Hocquaux | France | 147.03 | 10 | 48.14 | 9 | 98.89 |
| 10 | Conor Stakelum | Ireland | 144.52 | 9 | 50.69 | 10 | 93.83 |
| 11 | Kyeong Jae-seok | South Korea | 132.13 | 11 | 48.12 | 11 | 84.01 |
| 12 | Alessandro Fadini | Italy | 123.09 | 12 | 46.37 | 12 | 76.72 |
| 13 | Lap Kan Yuen | Hong Kong | 99.04 | 13 | 38.98 | 13 | 60.06 |

=== Ladies ===
| Rank | Name | Nation | Total | SP | | FS | |
|---|---|---|---|---|---|---|---|
| 1 | Wakaba Higuchi | Japan | 178.86 | 1 | 66.66 | 3 | 112.20 |
| 2 | Kim Na-hyun | South Korea | 177.27 | 3 | 59.58 | 1 | 117.69 |
| 3 | Mirai Nagasu | United States | 176.86 | 2 | 61.29 | 2 | 115.57 |
| 4 | Roberta Rodeghiero | Italy | 164.82 | 5 | 56.65 | 4 | 108.17 |
| 5 | Park So-youn | South Korea | 156.85 | 4 | 56.93 | 5 | 99.92 |
| 6 | Kanako Murakami | Japan | 151.27 | 8 | 54.61 | 6 | 96.66 |
| 7 | Lutricia Bock | Germany | 149.08 | 7 | 54.68 | 7 | 94.40 |
| 8 | Nathalie Weinzierl | Germany | 144.96 | 10 | 52.07 | 8 | 92.89 |
| 9 | Nicole Schott | Germany | 144.17 | 6 | 55.07 | 10 | 89.10 |
| 10 | Micol Cristini | Italy | 142.92 | 11 | 50.43 | 9 | 92.49 |
| 11 | Viveca Lindfors | Finland | 140.95 | 9 | 52.71 | 12 | 88.24 |
| 12 | Kristen Spours | United Kingdom | 135.21 | 13 | 46.49 | 11 | 88.72 |
| 13 | Helery Hälvin | Estonia | 133.56 | 12 | 48.31 | 13 | 85.25 |
| 14 | Fruzsina Medgyesi | Hungary | 126.36 | 14 | 46.37 | 16 | 79.99 |
| 15 | Tanja Odermatt | Switzerland | 124.84 | 16 | 42.61 | 15 | 82.23 |
| 16 | Liubov Efimenko | Finland | 115.38 | 18 | 39.87 | 17 | 75.51 |
| 17 | Antonina Dubinina | Serbia | 113.57 | 15 | 44.51 | 21 | 69.06 |
| 18 | Park Se-bin | South Korea | 112.95 | 21 | 30.36 | 14 | 82.59 |
| 19 | Anna Dušková | Czech Republic | 111.53 | 17 | 41.21 | 19 | 70.32 |
| 20 | Gerli Liinamäe | Estonia | 108.28 | 20 | 36.91 | 18 | 71.37 |
| 21 | Aleksandra Golovkina | Lithuania | 108.19 | 19 | 38.07 | 20 | 70.12 |

=== Pairs ===
| Rank | Name | Nation | Total | SP | | FS | |
|---|---|---|---|---|---|---|---|
| 1 | Nicole Della Monica / Matteo Guarise | Italy | 185.18 | 2 | 58.22 | 1 | 126.96 |
| 2 | Valentina Marchei / Ondřej Hotárek | Italy | 179.56 | 1 | 59.40 | 2 | 120.16 |
| 3 | Rebecca Ghilardi / Filippo Ambrosini | Italy | 144.70 | 3 | 55.20 | 4 | 89.50 |
| 4 | Jessica Pfund / Joshua Santillan | United States | 138.94 | 4 | 49.18 | 3 | 89.76 |
| 5 | Goda Butkutė / Nikita Ermolaev | Lithuania | 126.84 | 6 | 40.62 | 5 | 86.22 |
| 6 | Ji Min-ji / Themistocles Leftheris | South Korea | 124.14 | 5 | 47.50 | 6 | 76.64 |

=== Ice dancing ===
| Rank | Name | Nation | Total | SD | | FD | |
|---|---|---|---|---|---|---|---|
| 1 | Charlène Guignard / Marco Fabbri | Italy | 162.12 | 1 | 63.04 | 1 | 99.08 |
| 2 | Lilah Fear / Lewis Gibson | United Kingdom | 139.60 | 2 | 53.38 | 2 | 86.22 |
| 3 | Cecilia Törn / Jussiville Partanen | Finland | 130.76 | 3 | 52.14 | 3 | 78.62 |
| 4 | Julia Biechler / Damian Dodge | United States | 127.76 | 4 | 52.04 | 5 | 75.72 |
| 5 | Jasmine Tessari / Francesco Fioretti | Italy | 122.14 | 6 | 45.08 | 4 | 77.06 |
| 6 | Justyna Plutowska / Jérémie Flemin | Poland | 114.34 | 5 | 46.26 | 6 | 68.08 |
| 7 | Mina Zdravkova / Christopher M. Davis | Bulgaria | 86.10 | 7 | 35.72 | 7 | 50.38 |

== Junior results ==
=== Men ===
| Rank | Name | Nation | Total | SP | | FS | |
|---|---|---|---|---|---|---|---|
| 1 | Roman Galay | Finland | 174.19 | 1 | 60.80 | 2 | 113.39 |
| 2 | Petr Kotlařík | Czech Republic | 173.82 | 2 | 58.67 | 1 | 115.15 |
| 3 | Adrien Bannister | Italy | 160.44 | 3 | 55.25 | 3 | 105.19 |
| 4 | Aleksandr Selevko | Estonia | 154.40 | 5 | 50.10 | 4 | 104.30 |
| 5 | Radek Jakubka | Czech Republic | 137.45 | 4 | 54.73 | 7 | 82.72 |
| 6 | Isaak Droysen | Germany | 135.70 | 6 | 48.53 | 5 | 87.17 |
| 7 | Xavier Vauclin | France | 129.50 | 7 | 44.25 | 6 | 85.25 |
| 8 | Michel Tsiba | Netherlands | 108.57 | 8 | 36.86 | 8 | 71.71 |
| 9 | Mihhail Selevko | Estonia | 100.53 | 9 | 35.51 | 9 | 65.02 |
| WD | Thomas Stoll | Germany | N/A | | | | |

=== Ladies ===
| Rank | Name | Nation | Total | SP | | FS | |
|---|---|---|---|---|---|---|---|
| 1 | Kim Boyoung | South Korea | 137.21 | 3 | 42.72 | 1 | 94.49 |
| 2 | Lee Min-young | South Korea | 125.20 | 1 | 45.15 | 4 | 80.05 |
| 3 | Lara Naki Gutmann | Italy | 122.50 | 5 | 40.48 | 3 | 82.02 |
| 4 | Jeon Gyo-hee | South Korea | 121.85 | 6 | 38.85 | 2 | 83.00 |
| 5 | Annika Hocke | Germany | 118.21 | 4 | 40.92 | 6 | 77.29 |
| 6 | Cassandra Johansson | Sweden | 116.75 | 2 | 43.75 | 8 | 73.00 |
| 7 | Viktoria Novichonok | Russia | 115.11 | 10 | 37.62 | 5 | 77.49 |
| 8 | Linnea Ceder | Finland | 110.18 | 13 | 33.38 | 7 | 76.80 |
| 9 | Sara Conti | Italy | 106.33 | 7 | 38.83 | 9 | 67.50 |
| 10 | Alisa Stomakhina | Austria | 105.04 | 9 | 37.99 | 10 | 67.05 |
| 11 | Sara Boschiroli | Italy | 102.31 | 8 | 38.00 | 12 | 64.31 |
| 12 | Anni Skogberg | Finland | 98.88 | 14 | 32.95 | 11 | 65.93 |
| 13 | Chenny Paolucci | Italy | 98.35 | 11 | 35.18 | 13 | 63.17 |
| 14 | Tina Leuenberger | Switzerland | 97.26 | 12 | 34.15 | 14 | 63.11 |
| 15 | Kristina Shkuleta-Gromova | Estonia | 92.31 | 15 | 31.91 | 15 | 60.40 |
| 16 | Doris Louhikoski | Finland | 90.80 | 17 | 31.47 | 16 | 59.33 |
| 17 | Matilde Battagin | Italy | 87.13 | 19 | 30.93 | 17 | 56.20 |
| 18 | Alice Martina Geraghty | Italy | 82.42 | 16 | 31.85 | 18 | 50.57 |
| 19 | Simona Gospodinova | Bulgaria | 79.56 | 20 | 30.41 | 19 | 49.15 |
| 20 | Romy Schallert | Austria | 76.22 | 18 | 31.03 | 20 | 45.19 |
| WD | Melyna Decobert | France | N/A | | | | |

=== Pairs ===
| Rank | Name | Nation | Total | SP | | FS | |
|---|---|---|---|---|---|---|---|
| 1 | Giulia Foresti / Leo Luca Sforza | Italy | 136.87 | 1 | 53.08 | 1 | 83.79 |
| 2 | Irma Angela Caldara / Edoardo Caputo | Italy | 109.20 | 2 | 37.41 | 2 | 71.79 |
