= Joshua Reagan =

American pair skater (born 1989)

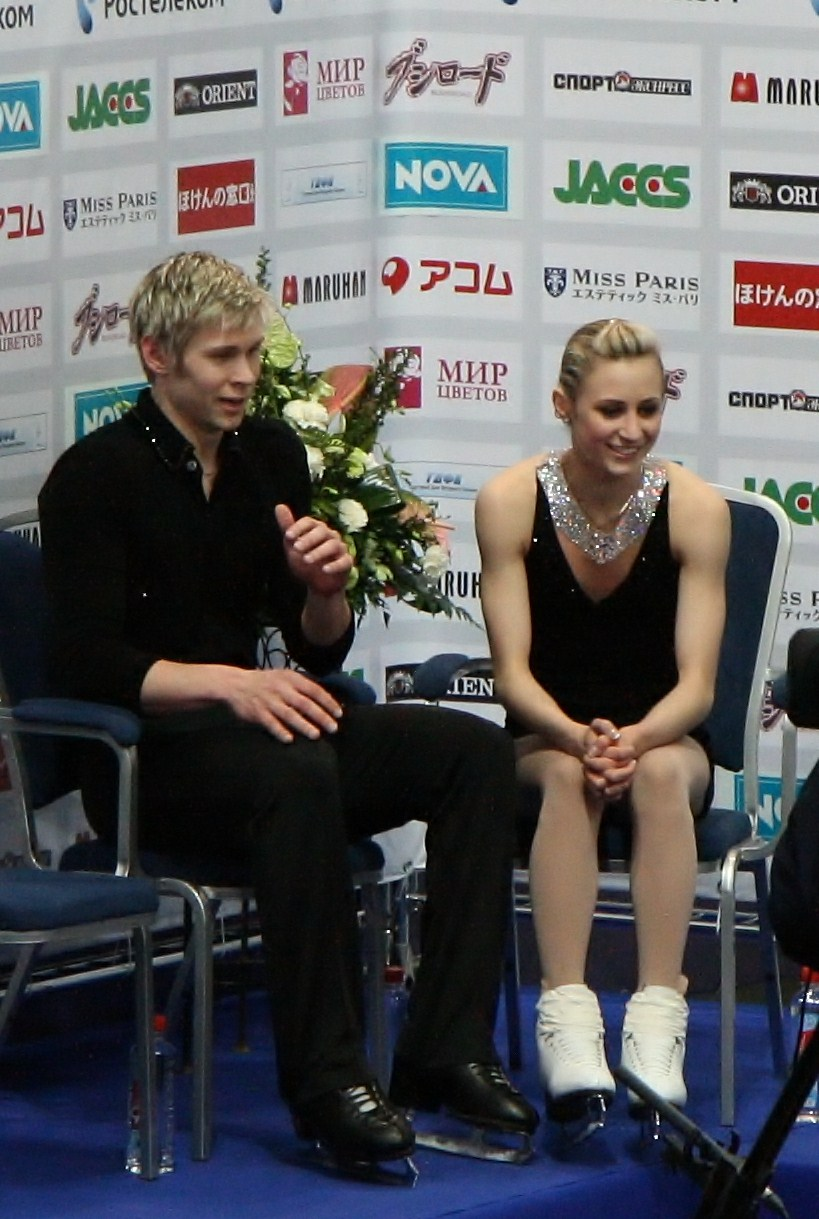
- Reagan and Cain at the 2011 Cup of Russia

Personal information
- Born: November 5, 1989 (age 36) DeSoto, Texas, U.S.
- Height: 6 ft 0 in (1.83 m)

Figure skating career
- Country: Canada (2013–17); United States (2009–12)
- Discipline: Pair skating
- Partner: Brittany Jones (2013–17); Ashley Cain (2009–12)
- Began skating: 1998
- Retired: 2017

Joshua Reagan (born November 5, 1989) is an American pair skater. Competing for Canada with Brittany Jones, he is the 2016 U.S. International Classic champion. Earlier in his career, he represented the United States with Ashley Cain. They became the 2011 U.S. Junior champions and placed fourth at the 2011 World Junior Championships.

== Personal life ==
His father is an ophthalmologist who lives in Dallas, Texas. Josh currently lives in Toronto, Ontario. Reagan and Jones retired from skating in July 2017.

== Career ==
Reagan began skating in 1998 at Americas Ice Garden in downtown Dallas. On August 1, 2005, he sustained a concussion in an on-ice fall and became blind in one eye for a year. He focused on swimming for the next four years but then returned to skating.

Reagan began skating with Ashley Cain in April 2009. They were coached by David Kirby (son of Michael Kirby) and Peter Cain at the Dr. Pepper Star Center in Euless, Texas. Cain and Reagan finished 4th at the 2011 World Junior Championships and won the 2011 U.S. Junior title. On February 24, 2012, they announced the end of their partnership.

On March 22, 2012, it was announced that Reagan had teamed up with 2011 U.S. senior champion Caitlin Yankowskas. They were coached by Johnny Johns, David Kirby, and Marina Zueva in Canton, Michigan. Yankowskas and Reagan were assigned to the 2012 Cup of China and the 2012 NHK Trophy but withdrew from both events after Reagan sustained a rib injury in practice. They ended their partnership without having competing anywhere. On April 29, 2013, Reagan and Becky Bereswill announced they had formed a partnership. They too parted ways without appearing in a competition.

In October 2013, Reagan was paired with Canadian skater Brittany Jones by Kristy Wirtz and Kris Wirtz, who coached the pair in Kitchener-Waterloo, Ontario. Jones/Reagan decided to compete for Canada and placed seventh at the 2014 Canadian Championships. They changed coaches in spring 2015, moving to Bryce Davison.

Jones/Reagan won gold at the 2016 U.S. International Classic after placing second in the short and first in the free.

== Programs ==
=== With Jones ===
Season	Short program	Free skating
2016–17	Under the Bridge by Red Hot Chili Peppers	Violin Fantasy on Puccini's Turandot by Vanessa-Mae; Nessun dorma performed by Josh Groban
2015–16	Come Together by The Beatles choreo. by Shawn Sawyer	Sentimental Journey; Stardust by Nat King Cole choreo. by David Wilson
2014–15	W.E. by Abel Korzeniowski choreo. by Mark Pillay	Young and Beautiful by Lana Del Rey choreo. by Mark Pillay
2013–14	Samba for You by Santana	Samson and Delilah by Camille Saint-Saëns

=== With Yankowskas ===
Season	Short program	Free skating
2012–13	Daphnis et Chloé by Maurice Ravel	O mio babbino caro (from Gianni Schicchi) by Giacomo Puccini

=== With Cain ===
Season	Short program	Free skating
2011–12	Moon River by Henry Mancini	Doctor Zhivago by Maurice Jarre
2010–11	Clubbed to Death (from The Matrix) by Rob Dougan	Romeo and Juliet Ouverture by Pyotr Tchaikovsky
2009–10	One by Three Dog Night performed by the London Symphony	Scheherazade by Nikolai Rimsky-Korsakov

== Competitive highlights ==
GP: Grand Prix; CS: Challenger Series; JGP: Junior Grand Prix

=== With Jones for Canada ===
International
Event	13–14	14–15	15–16	16–17
GP Skate Canada		7th		7th
CS Autumn Classic		7th		
CS U.S. Classic		4th		1st
Autumn Classic			4th	
National
Canadian Champ.	7th	7th	6th	4th
SC Challenge	2nd			
TBD = Assigned

=== Pair skating with Ashley Cain (for the United States) ===
- S – Senior event, J – Junior event, N – Novice event

Competition placements at junior & senior level
Season	2009–10	2010–11	2011–12
GP Cup of Russia			6th S
Cup of Nice			4th S
World Junior Championships		4th J	
JGP Final		5th J	
JGP Czech Republic		2nd J	
JGP Great Britain		6th J	
U.S. Championships	1st N	1st J	6th S
