= 2016 CS Warsaw Cup =

- Type: ISU Challenger Series
- Date: 17 – 20 November 2016
- Season: 2016–17
- Location: Warsaw, Poland
- Host: Polish Figure Skating Association
- Venue: Torwar

Champions
- Men's singles: (Sweden) Alexander Majorov
- Ladies' singles: (Germany) Nicole Schott
- Pairs: (Italy) Valentina Marchei / Ondřej Hotárek
- Ice dance: (Russia) Ekaterina Bobrova / Dmitri Soloviev
- Previous: 2016 CS Finlandia Trophy
- Next: 2016 CS Tallinn Trophy

The 2016 CS Warsaw Cup was a senior international figure skating competition, held in November 2016 in Warsaw, Poland. It was part of the 2016–17 ISU Challenger Series. Medals were awarded in the disciplines of men's singles, ladies' singles, pair skating, and ice dancing.

== Entries ==
The International Skating Union published the full preliminary list of entries on 30 October 2016.

Country	Men	Ladies	Pairs	Ice dance
Armenia				Tina Garabedian / Simon Proulx-Sénécal
Australia	Mark Webster	Kailani Craine	Ekaterina Alexandrovskaya / Harley Windsor	
Belarus			Tatiana Danilova / Mikalai Kamianchuk	
Croatia			Lana Petranović / Antonio Souza-Kordeyru	
Czech Republic	Petr Kotlařík; Jan Kurník	Eliška Březinová; Michaela-Lucie Hanzlíková; Aneta Janiczková		
Estonia	Daniil Zurav	Johanna Allik; Gerli Liinamäe		
Finland		Liubov Efimenko; Emmi Peltonen		
France	Kévin Aymoz	Léa Serna		Lorenza Alessandrini / Pierre Souquet; Kate Louise Bagnall / Benjamin Allain
Germany	Paul Fentz	Nicole Schott; Nathalie Weinzierl	Minerva Fabienne Hase / Nolan Seegert	
Great Britain	Phillip Harris	Anna Litvinenko		
Hong Kong	Wayne Wing Yin Chung			
Italy	Matteo Rizzo	Roberta Rodeghiero; Guia Maria Tagliapietra	Rebecca Ghilardi / Filippo Ambrosini; Valentina Marchei / Ondřej Hotárek	
Japan		Riona Kato; Miyu Nakashio		
Kazakhstan	Abzal Rakimgaliev			
Lithuania		Aleksandra Golovkina; Elžbieta Kropa		
Malaysia	Julian Zhi Jie Yee			
Netherlands	Thomas Kennes			
Norway	Sondre Oddvoll Bøe			
Poland	Krzysztof Gała; Łukasz Kędzierski; Igor Reznichenko	Elżbieta Gabryszak; Colette Coco Kaminski; Agnieszka Rejment		Justyna Plutowska / Jérémie Flemin
Russia	Dmitri Aliev	Alexandra Avstriyskaya		Ekaterina Bobrova / Dmitri Soloviev; Anastasia Safronova / Ilia Zimin; Tiffany Zahorski / Jonathan Guerreiro
Serbia		Antonina Dubinina		
Singapore		Chloe Ing		
Slovakia	Jakub Kršňák; Michael Neuman	Bronislava Dobiášová; Alexandra Hagarová; Miroslava Magulová		Lucie Myslivečková / Lukáš Csölley
Slovenia		Daša Grm		
Sweden	Alexander Majorov; Ondrej Spiegl	Anita Östlund		
Switzerland	Stéphane Walker	Jérômie Repond; Yasmine Kimiko Yamada		
United States	Tomoki Hiwatashi		Chelsea Liu / Brian Johnson	Charlotte Maxwell / Ryan Devereaux

Withdrew before starting orders drawn

- Men: Deniss Vasiļjevs (LAT)
- Ladies: Hristina Vassileva (BUL), Angelīna Kučvaļska (LAT)

== Results ==
=== Men ===
Rank	Name	Nation	Total	SP		FS	
1	Alexander Majorov	Sweden	228.97	1	78.90	1	150.07
2	Dmitri Aliev	Russia	217.06	3	70.70	2	146.36
3	Stéphane Walker	Switzerland	209.04	4	70.58	4	138.46
4	Igor Reznichenko	Poland	200.43	5	69.85	5	130.58
5	Julian Zhi Jie Yee	Malaysia	197.75	2	71.27	7	126.48
6	Matteo Rizzo	Italy	196.03	7	66.55	6	129.48
7	Paul Fentz	Germany	191.96	16	53.21	3	138.75
8	Phillip Harris	Great Britain	185.18	6	68.90	10	116.28
9	Tomoki Hiwatashi	United States	182.12	8	63.54	8	118.58
10	Kévin Aymoz	France	176.54	10	60.61	11	115.93
11	Sondre Oddvoll Bøe	Norway	173.71	11	56.49	9	117.22
12	Abzal Rakimgaliev	Kazakhstan	167.12	19	51.86	12	115.26
13	Daniil Zurav	Estonia	161.72	18	51.94	14	109.78
14	Petr Kotlařík	Czech Republic	161.21	20	50.91	13	110.30
15	Thomas Kennes	Netherlands	159.63	15	53.55	15	106.08
16	Jan Kurník	Czech Republic	158.99	14	54.59	16	104.40
17	Krzysztof Gała	Poland	150.46	12	56.35	19	94.11
18	Michael Neuman	Slovakia	149.69	17	52.09	17	97.60
19	Jakub Kršňák	Slovakia	146.89	22	49.57	18	97.32
20	Łukasz Kędzierski	Poland	146.10	13	55.98	21	90.12
21	Mark Webster	Australia	144.46	21	50.60	20	93.86
22	Wayne Wing Yin Chung	Hong Kong	106.04	23	34.94	22	71.10
WD	Ondrej Spiegl	Sweden		9	62.40		

=== Ladies ===
Rank	Name	Nation	Total	SP		FS	
1	Nicole Schott	Germany	165.92	1	60.47	2	105.45
2	Kailani Craine	Australia	163.38	5	53.31	1	110.07
3	Alexandra Avstriyskaya	Russia	157.57	3	54.84	4	102.73
4	Miyu Nakashio	Japan	157.23	4	54.13	3	103.10
5	Nathalie Weinzierl	Germany	155.99	2	57.41	6	98.58
6	Emmi Peltonen	Finland	153.04	6	51.79	5	101.25
7	Anita Östlund	Sweden	140.33	10	45.95	7	94.38
8	Roberta Rodeghiero	Italy	136.56	8	48.17	9	88.39
9	Daša Grm	Slovenia	133.23	11	45.84	10	87.39
10	Riona Kato	Japan	131.35	17	41.49	8	89.86
11	Colette Coco Kaminski	Poland	130.69	12	45.37	11	85.32
12	Léa Serna	France	128.78	9	47.35	13	81.43
13	Antonina Dubinina	Serbia	123.19	13	44.77	16	78.42
14	Guia Maria Tagliapietra	Italy	122.90	14	44.29	14	78.61
15	Chloe Ing	Singapore	121.25	22	39.69	12	81.56
16	Michaela-Lucie Hanzlíková	Czech Republic	120.57	16	42.13	15	78.44
17	Yasmine Kimiko Yamada	Switzerland	118.52	15	44.08	18	74.44
18	Anna Litvinenko	Great Britain	117.25	21	40.37	17	76.88
19	Johanna Allik	Estonia	113.66	20	41.11	19	72.55
20	Bronislava Dobiášová	Slovakia	111.91	23	39.66	20	72.25
21	Jérômie Repond	Switzerland	109.29	18	41.43	24	67.86
22	Gerli Liinamäe	Estonia	108.66	25	37.11	22	71.55
23	Liubov Efimenko	Finland	108.30	26	36.43	21	71.87
24	Alexandra Hagarová	Slovakia	108.28	19	41.15	26	67.13
25	Elżbieta Gabryszak	Poland	101.46	27	32.83	23	68.63
26	Aneta Janiczková	Czech Republic	100.52	24	39.33	27	61.19
27	Eliška Březinová	Czech Republic	99.61	29	32.47	25	67.14
28	Agnieszka Rejment	Poland	90.72	28	32.82	28	57.90
29	Miroslava Magulová	Slovakia	72.87	30	21.42	29	51.45
WD	Elžbieta Kropa	Lithuania		7	50.43		

=== Pairs ===
Rank	Name	Nation	Total	SP		FS	
1	Valentina Marchei / Ondřej Hotárek	Italy	189.26	1	67.04	1	122.22
2	Chelsea Liu / Brian Johnson	United States	141.80	2	52.72	4	89.08
3	Minerva Fabienne Hase / Nolan Seegert	Germany	141.62	3	49.12	2	92.50
4	Lana Petranović / Antonio Souza-Kordeyru	Croatia	138.32	5	46.50	3	91.82
5	Rebecca Ghilardi / Filippo Ambrosini	Italy	128.48	4	47.90	5	80.58
6	Tatiana Danilova / Mikalai Kamianchuk	Belarus	119.76	6	45.46	6	74.30
WD	Ekaterina Alexandrovskaya / Harley Windsor	Australia					

=== Ice dancing ===
Rank	Name	Nation	Total	SD		FD	
1	Ekaterina Bobrova / Dmitri Soloviev	Russia	183.60	1	72.98	1	110.62
2	Tiffany Zahorski / Jonathan Guerreiro	Russia	173.02	2	69.06	2	103.96
3	Lucie Myslivečková / Lukáš Csölley	Slovakia	135.12	4	53.30	4	81.82
4	Justyna Plutowska / Jérémie Flemin	Poland	131.00	5	48.98	3	82.02
5	Tina Garabedian / Simon Proulx-Sénécal	Armenia	129.88	3	53.94	5	75.94
6	Charlotte Maxwell / Ryan Devereaux	United States	120.80	6	47.94	6	72.86
7	Anastasia Safronova / Ilia Zimin	Russia	99.66	7	38.44	7	61.22
WD	Kate Louise Bagnall / Benjamin Allain	France		8	37.66		
WD	Lorenza Alessandrini / Pierre Souquet	France					
