= Ashley Cain (figure skater) =

American pair skater (born 1995)

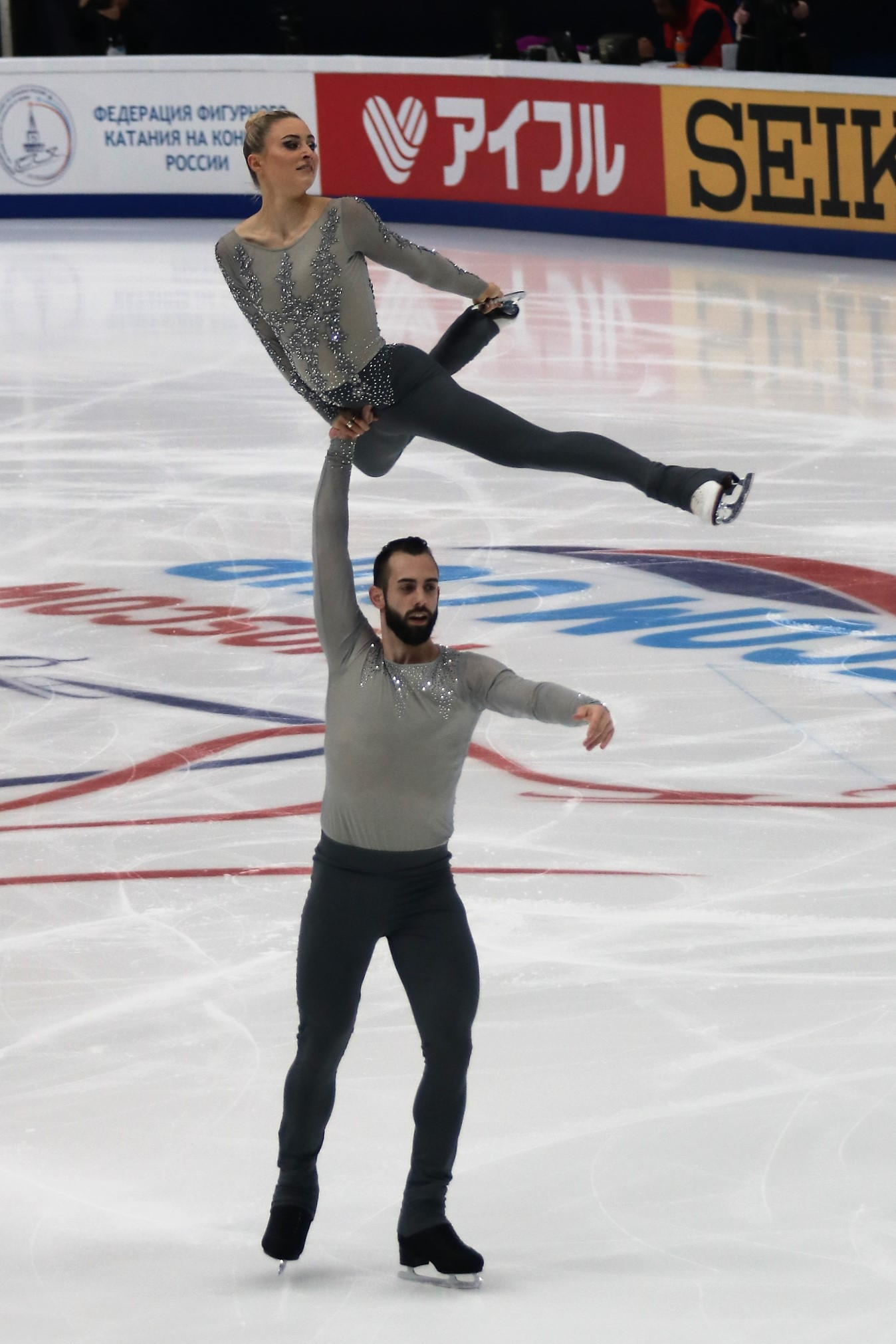
- Cain-Gribble and LeDuc at the 2018 Rostelecom Cup

Personal information
- Born: Ashley Elizabeth Cain; July 22, 1995 (age 31) Dallas, Texas, U.S.
- Height: 5 ft 6 in (1.67 m)

Figure skating career
- Country: United States
- Discipline: Pair skating (2009–12, 2016–22); Women's singles (2010–16)
- Partner: Timothy LeDuc (2016–22); Joshua Reagan (2009–12)
- Began skating: 1997
- Retired: 2022
- Highest WS: 14th
Four Continents Championships
Silver medal – second place	2018 Taipei	Pairs
U.S. Championships
Gold medal – first place	2019 Detroit	Pairs
Gold medal – first place	2022 Nashville	Pairs
Bronze medal – third place	2017 Kansas City	Pairs
Bronze medal – third place	2021 Las Vegas	Pairs
World Team Trophy
Gold medal – first place	2019 Fukuoka	Pairs
Bronze medal – third place	2017 Tokyo	Pairs

Ashley Elizabeth Cain (formerly Cain-Gribble; born July 22, 1995) is a retired American pair skater. With her skating partner, Timothy LeDuc, she is a two-time U.S. national champion (2019, 2022), the 2018 Four Continents silver medalist, and a two-time Grand Prix medalist. Earlier in her career, she also competed in single skating, becoming the 2013 Nebelhorn Trophy bronze medalist and the 2012 U.S. Junior silver medalist.

== Personal life ==
Ashley Cain was born July 22, 1995, in Carrollton, Texas. She is the daughter of Peter Cain, an Australian former pair skater who competed at the 1980 Winter Olympics, and Darlene Wendt, a Canadian former ice dancer. She is also the niece of Elizabeth Cain and the cousin of Sean Carlow, who competed for Australia in pair skating and men's singles, respectively. She became engaged to Dalton Gribble in March 2018, and they married on June 1, 2019, before divorcing in 2023.

Cain studied online at Texas Tech University Independent School.

== Career ==
Cain began learning to skate in 1999. Her father introduced her to pairs when she was seven or eight years old. She is a member of U.S. Figure Skating's DREAM (Determination, Responsibility, Education, Achievement, Motivation) Team, which is involved in mentoring developing skaters.

=== Early partnerships ===
Competing in novice pairs, Cain finished 8th with Sergei Sidorov at the 2008 U.S. Championships. She teamed up with Joshua Reagan in April 2009. The pair was coached by David Kirby and Peter Cain at the Dr. Pepper Star Center in Euless, Texas.

In the 2010–11 season, Cain/Reagan received two Junior Grand Prix assignments, placing sixth in England and taking silver in the Czech Republic. In January 2011, they won the U.S. national junior title, becoming the only pair ever to win U.S. novice and junior titles in consecutive years. They ranked eighth in the short program, fourth in the free skate, and fourth overall at the 2011 World Junior Championships in Gangneung, South Korea.

The following season, Cain/Reagan moved up to the senior level. They ranked fourth at the 2011 International Cup of Nice and sixth at their sole Grand Prix assignment, the 2011 Cup of Russia, before placing sixth at the 2012 U.S. Championships. On February 24, 2012, they announced the end of their partnership.

=== Single skating ===
As a single skater, Cain began competing on the ISU Junior Grand Prix series in 2011 and won silver on the junior level at the 2012 U.S. Championships. She won the bronze medal at the 2013 Nebelhorn Trophy, her first senior international. The following season, she took bronze at the 2014 Ondrej Nepela Trophy and was invited to two Grand Prix events, the 2014 Cup of China and 2014 Rostelecom Cup.

Due to fatigue, Cain decided to retire from singles skating in September 2016.

=== Partnership with LeDuc ===
Following a suggestion from U.S. Figure Skating's Mitch Moyer, Cain tried out with Timothy LeDuc in May 2016. On May 23, 2016, they confirmed their intention to compete together. Peter Cain coached the pair in Euless, Texas.

==== 2016–17 season ====
Cain/LeDuc received three Challenger Series assignments. After placing fourth at the 2016 Nebelhorn Trophy and 2016 Finlandia Trophy, they were awarded the bronze medal at the 2016 Golden Spin of Zagreb, where they upgraded their twist from a double to a triple. Cain stated, "We just started rotating it days before we left for that competition." She had never performed it in competition during her earlier partnerships. They placed third at the 2017 US Figure Skating Championships. They placed ninth at the 2017 Four Continents Championships.

==== 2017–18 season ====
Cain/LeDuc started the season at the 2017 CS Lombardia Trophy, where they placed fourth. Cain/LeDuc placed seventh at the 2017 CS Nebelhorn Trophy. They placed sixth at the 2017 Cup of China. Cain and LeDuc placed fourth overall at the 2018 US Figure Skating Championships. They placed second at the 2018 Four Continents Championships, winning their first medal at an ISU championship event.

==== 2018–19 season ====
At the 2018 US International Figure Skating Classic, Cain/LeDuc placed first overall with a score of 173.05. They placed first overall at the 2018 Ondrej Nepela Trophy], with a score of 181.56. At their first Grand Prix event of the season, 2018 Skate America, they placed 4th in the short program and 3rd overall with a score of 175.05. At the 2018 Rostelecom Cup, they placed 7th in the short program and 6th overall, scoring 170.29.

Cain/LeDuc competed in a third Challenger event, the 2018 Golden Spin of Zagreb. Second after the short program, they placed fifth overall, following two falls in the free skate. The second fall involved Cain being dropped on her head while exiting a lift, seemingly being knocked unconscious briefly, before getting up and completing the program. She was subsequently taken to the hospital. There was considerable controversy amongst commentators that the referee had not halted the performance. She was subsequently diagnosed with a concussion.

At the 2019 U.S. Championships, she and LeDuc won their first US pairs title after placing second in the short program and first in the free skate. Speaking afterward, Cain said, "I was in the hospital in Croatia staring at the ceiling, thinking I need to remember this moment because a month from now, I want to be on top of the podium. It shows that with hard work, you can get to this moment. My team never gave up on me, even when I was at my lowest of lows. I have been lucky, even with the concussion." As national champions, Cain/LeDuc were assigned to compete at the 2019 Four Continents Championships in early February and as America's sole pairs team at the 2019 World Championships in Saitama, Japan.

Cain/LeDuc finished fourth at the Four Continents Championships, the highest placement for an American team, after finishing fourth in both segments. Cain had struggled in the practice sessions beforehand and felt dehydrated, but recovered and said she was satisfied with how they had performed.

At the World Championships, their first, Cain/LeDuc, placed ninth. LeDuc described the season as a "rollercoaster", given the issues with injuries, while Cain expressed pleasure at having earned a second pairs spot for the United States at the following year's World Championships. Cain/LeDuc concluded their season as part of the gold medal-winning Team USA at the 2019 World Team Trophy.

==== 2019–20 season ====
Cain/LeDuc began the season at the 2019 CS U.S. Classic, where they won gold, defeating reigning World silver medalists Evgenia Tarasova / Vladimir Morozov. They were considered one of the favorites for the gold medal at their first Grand Prix assignment of the year, the 2019 Skate America. They placed third in the short program after Cain fell on their throw triple Lutz. In the free skate, they had a second throw Lutz fall, as well as a popped side-by-side jump attempt and an aborted lift, which dropped them to fifth place overall. At their second Grand Prix, the 2019 Internationaux de France, Cain again fell on their throw Lutz in the short program, putting them fourth after that segment. They finally landed the throw Lutz in the free skate but remained in fourth place overall after Cain fell on their side-by-side triple Salchow attempt.

Competing at the 2020 U.S. Championships, Cain/LeDuc were fourth in the short program after she two-footed the landing of their throw Lutz and an error resulted in their death spiral element being completely invalidated. Struggling with the quality of elements in the free skate, they remained in fourth place overall, winning the pewter medal. LeDuc remarked, "it just wasn't in the cards for us today.

Despite their fourth place at the national championships, Cain/LeDuc were assigned to compete at the World Championships in Montreal, but these were canceled as a result of the coronavirus pandemic.

==== 2020–21 season ====
Cain/LeDuc were assigned to begin the season at the 2020 Skate America in Las Vegas, which, due to the ISU's desire to minimize international travel during the pandemic, was attended only by skaters training in the United States. They placed fourth in the short program after both underrotated their jumps and Cain two-footed the land of their throw Lutz. They were third in the free skate but remained in fourth place overall.

Competing next at the 2021 U.S. Championships, also held in Las Vegas, they placed fourth in the short program after Cain fell on her jump attempt and again two-footed the throw Lutz landing. Second in the free skate, they rose to the bronze medal position overall. They were named as first alternates to the 2021 World team and were later called up after the withdrawal of silver medalists Calalang/Johnson. They placed ninth at the World Championships.

==== 2021–22 season ====
The duo's preparations for the Olympic season were hampered by Cain contracting COVID-19 in late summer. As a result, they withdrew from their planned debut at the 2021 Cranberry Cup. Instead, they first appeared on the Challenger series at the 2021 CS Autumn Classic International, where they won the bronze medal. At their second Challenger event, the 2021 CS Finlandia Trophy, they won a second bronze medal, defeating Calalang/Johnson narrowly.

On the Grand Prix at 2021 Skate Canada International, Cain/LeDuc were sixth in the short program, but a second-place free skate took them to the bronze medal. Cain-Gribble said, "there were a lot of levels we didn't get which kept our score under the 130-mark, but we are going to focus on consistency" looking forward. They placed fourth at their second event, the 2021 NHK Trophy, finishing with a new personal best in the free skate.

With defending national champions Knierim/Frazier forced to withdraw from the 2022 U.S. Championships but still anticipated to be named to the U.S. Olympic team, the contest for the second American berth was widely seen to be between Cain/LeDuc and Calalang/Johnson. Cain/LeDuc placed first in both segments of the competition, with the only error being Cain doubling out on a planned triple Salchow jump, while Calalang/Johnson made several errors and finished in second. They were named to the U.S. Olympic team the following day. LeDuc called the prospect "something we've dreamed about for a long time. We have worked so extremely hard and have visualized this so many times." In a February 2022 interview, LeDuc said that rather than a "romantic" approach to pair skating, they and Cain "[have] always been about equality and showing two amazing athletes coming together to create something beautiful." Commenting on the partnership, their coach, Peter Cain, stated: "They don't ever point fingers or blame each other. One person can make a mistake, and it's the team, not the individual."

At the 2022 Winter Olympics in the pairs event, Cain/LeDuc placed eighth. They skated a strong short program to finish seventh in the segment. Cain had injured her right ankle in practice days earlier but said that "in the last two years, what we've learned the most is how to adapt to what has come our way, and this was just another thing that we needed to adapt to." In the free skate, Cain's multiple jump errors dropped them to ninth in that segment and eighth overall.

Days after the Olympics concluded, Vladimir Putin ordered an invasion of Ukraine, as a result of which the International Skating Union banned all Russian and Belarusian skaters from competing at the 2022 World Championships. As well, the Chinese Skating Association opted not to send athletes to compete in Montpellier. As those countries’ athletes comprised the entirety of the top five pairs at the Olympics, this greatly impacted the field. Cain/LeDuc entered the event as medal favorites. They placed second in the short program with a mostly clean program. Cain struggled in the free skate, falling on her triple loop jump and a throw triple Lutz, before a third fall on a triple Salchow caused her to hit her head on the ice. The program was stopped, and Cain was taken off the ice by medics on a stretcher for evaluation.

On June 13, Cain and LeDuc announced their retirement from competitive skating. Cain said she would engage in professional skating in shows and keep coaching in Euless with her parents. Later that year, Cain began portraying the role of Elsa in Disney on Ice.

== Programs ==
=== With LeDuc ===
Season	Short program	Free skating	Exhibition
2021–2022	The White Crow by Ilan Eshkeri performed by Lisa Batiashvili	W.E. by Abel Korzeniowski	
2020–2021	Never Tear Us Apart by Bishop Briggs	Piano Concerto No. 2 by Sergei Rachmaninoff	
2019–2020	A Storm is Coming by Tommee Profitt, Liv Ash	The Middle of the World (from Moonlight) by Nicholas Britell; Experience by Ludovico Einaudi	
2018–2019	Bella Belle by The Electric Swing Circus	W.E. (soundtrack) by Abel Korzeniowski choreo. by Pasquale Camerlengo	Get Up by Leah LeDuc
2017–2018	I'll Take Care of You by Joe Bonamassa	The Great Gatsby (soundtrack): Bang Bang; Young and Beautiful; A Little Party Never Killed Nobody	Get Up by Leah LeDuc
2016–2017	I Put a Spell on You by Jay Hawkins performed by Annie Lennox	The Prayer performed by Andrea Bocelli, Celine Dion	

=== Ladies' singles ===
Season	Short program	Free skating
2015–2016	Skinny Love by Birdy choreo. by Jeremy Abbott	Boléro for Violin and Orchestra by Vanessa-Mae choreo. by Scott Brown
2014–2015	Mission: Impossible performed by The Piano Guys and Lindsey Stirling choreo. by Scott Brown	Evita by Andrew Lloyd Webber choreo. by Scott Brown
2013–2014	Flamenco Fire by Didulya	Ave Maria by Johann Sebastian Bach performed by William Joseph
2012–2013	Montserrat by Orquesta del Plata performed by Bajofondo	Ave Maria by Johann Sebastian Bach performed by William Joseph
2011–2012	Montserrat by Orquesta del Plata performed by Bajofondo	Who Wants to Live Forever by David Garrett
2010–2011	Love in Venice by Edvin Marton	The Music of the Night (from The Phantom of the Opera) performed by André Rieu
2009–2010	Claire de Lune by Claude Debussy	Ratatouille by Michael Giacchino performed by Tim Simonec

=== With Reagan ===
Season	Short program	Free skating	Exhibition
2011–2012	Moon River by Henry Mancini	Doctor Zhivago by Maurice Jarre	
2010–2011	Clubbed to Death (from The Matrix) by Rob Dougan	Romeo and Juliet Ouverture by Pyotr Tchaikovsky	Love Story by Taylor Swift
2009–2010	One by Three Dog Night performed by the London Symphony	Scheherazade by Nikolai Rimsky-Korsakov	

== Competitive highlights ==
- GP – Event of the ISU Grand Prix Series
- JGP – Event of the ISU Junior Grand Prix Series
- CS – Event of the ISU Challenger Series
- WD – Withdrew from competition
- C – Event was cancelled
- Medals at team events are awarded for the team results only. Individual placements at team events are listed in parentheses.

=== Pair skating with Timothy LeDuc ===
Competition placements at senior level
Season	2016–17	2017–18	2018–19	2019-20	2020–21	2021–22
Winter Olympics						8th
World Championships			9th	C	9th	WD
Four Continents Championships	9th	2nd	4th			
U.S. Championships	3rd	4th	1st	4th	3rd	1st
World Team Trophy	3rd (5th)		1st (5th)			
GP Cup of China		6th				
GP France				4th		
GP NHK Trophy						4th
GP Rostelecom Cup			6th			
GP Skate America			3rd	5th	4th	
GP Skate Canada						3rd
CS Autumn Classic						3rd
CS Finlandia Trophy	4th					3rd
CS Golden Spin of Zagreb	3rd		5th	1st		
CS Lombardia Trophy		4th				
CS Nebelhorn Trophy	4th	7th				
CS Ondrej Nepela Trophy			1st			
CS U.S. Classic			1st	1st		

=== Single skating ===
Competition placements at junior & senior level
Season	2010–11	2011–12	2012–13	2013-14	2014–15	2015–16
U.S. Championships	6th J	2nd J	12th S	12th S	14th S	14th S
GP Cup of China					10th S	
GP Rostelecom Cup					8th S	
CS Ondrej Nepela Trophy					3rd S	
Nebelhorn Trophy				3rd S		
JGP France			5th J			
JGP Latvia		6th J				
JGP Romania		5th J				

=== Pair skating with Joshua Reagan ===
Competition placements at junior & senior level
Season	2010–11	2011–12
World Junior Championships	4th J	
Junior Grand Prix Final	5th J	
U.S. Championships	1st J	6th S
GP Cup of Russia		6th S
Cup of Nice		4th S
JGP Czech Republic	2nd J	
JGP Great Britain	6th J	

== Detailed results ==
- Small medals for the short program and free skating are only awarded at ISU Championships.
- At national events in the United States, pewter medals are awarded for fourth place.
- Medals at team events are awarded for the team results only. Individual placements at team events are listed in parentheses.

=== Pair skating with Timothy LeDuc ===
ISU personal best scores in the +5/-5 GOE System
Segment	Type	Score	Event
Total	TSS	205.58	2019 CS U.S. International Classic
Short program	TSS	76.23	2019 CS U.S. International Classic
Short program	TES	42.35	2019 CS U.S. International Classic
Short program	PCS	34.98	2022 World Championships
Free skating	TSS	132.04	2021 NHK Trophy
Free skating	TES	66.19	2021 NHK Trophy
Free skating	PCS	67.54	2019 Internationaux de France

ISU personal best scores in the +3/-3 GOE System
Segment	Type	Score	Event
Total	TSS	190.61	2018 Four Continents Championships
Short program	TSS	66.76	2018 Four Continents Championships
Short program	TES	37.36	2018 Four Continents Championships
Short program	PCS	29.40	2018 Four Continents Championships
Free skating	TSS	123.85	2018 Four Continents Championships
Free skating	TES	63.51	2018 Four Continents Championships
Free skating	PCS	60.34	2018 Four Continents Championships

Results in the 2016–17 season
Date	Event	SP		FS		Total	
Date	Event	P	Score	P	Score	P	Score
Sep 22–24, 2016	(Germany) 2016 CS Nebelhorn Trophy	5	52.40	4	98.00	4	150.40
Oct 6–10, 2016	(Finland) 2016 CS Finlandia Trophy	6	54.26	4	104.37	4	158.63
Dec 7–10, 2016	(Croatia) 2016 CS Golden Spin of Zagreb	4	56.60	2	115.58	3	172.18
Jan 14–22, 2017	(United States) 2017 U.S. Championships	1	69.33	3	115.08	3	184.41
Feb 15–19, 2017	(South Korea) 2017 Four Continents Championships	9	62.58	10	106.27	9	168.87
Apr 20–23, 2017	(Japan) 2017 World Team Trophy	5	59.57	5	104.23	3 (5)	163.80

Results in the 2017–18 season
Date	Event	SP		FS		Total	
Date	Event	P	Score	P	Score	P	Score
Sep 14–17, 2017	(Italy) 2017 CS Lombardia Trophy	4	60.56	5	105.76	4	166.32
Sep 27–30, 2017	(Germany) 2017 CS Nebelhorn Trophy	10	55.47	5	120.88	7	176.35
Nov 3–5, 2017	2017 Cup of China	7	53.15	6	101.21	6	154.36
Dec 29, 2017 – Jan 8, 2018	(United States) 2018 U.S. Championships	8	60.03	4	127.11	4	187.14
Jan 22–28, 2018	(Taiwan) 2018 Four Continents Championships	1	66.76	2	123.85	2	190.61

Results in the 2018–19 season
Date	Event	SP		FS		Total	
Date	Event	P	Score	P	Score	P	Score
Sep 12–16, 2018	(United States) 2019 CS U.S. International Classic	1	59.10	1	113.95	1	173.05
Sep 19–22, 2018	(Slovakia) 2018 Ondrej Nepela Trophy	1	65.68	1	115.88	1	181.56
Oct 19–21, 2018	(United States) 2018 Skate America	4	57.72	2	117.34	3	176.06
Nov 16–18, 2018	(Russia) 2018 Rostelecom Cup	7	58.79	6	112.50	6	170.29
Dec 5–8, 2018	(Croatia) 2018 CS Golden Spin of Zagreb	2	64.34	5	105.33	5	169.67
Feb 4–10, 2019	(United States) 2019 Four Continents Championships	4	67.49	4	129.33	4	196.82
Mar 18–24, 2019	(Japan) 2019 World Championships	9	66.93	9	126.88	9	193.81
Apr 11–14, 2019	(Japan) 2019 World Team Trophy	5	66.91	5	125.24	1 (5)	192.15

Results in the 2019–20 season
Date	Event	SP		FS		Total	
Date	Event	P	Score	P	Score	P	Score
Sep 17–22, 2019	(United States) 2019 CS U.S. International Classic	1	76.23	1	129.35	1	205.58
Oct 18–20, 2019	(United States) 2019 Skate America	3	68.20	5	109.34	5	177.54
Nov 1–3, 2019	2019 Internationaux de France	4	66.12	4	129.66	4	195.78
Jan 20–26, 2020	(United States) 2020 U.S. Championships	4	67.56	4	128.26	4	197.12

Results in the 2020–21 season
Date	Event	SP		FS		Total	
Date	Event	P	Score	P	Score	P	Score
Oct 23–24, 2020	(United States) 2020 Skate America	4	64.21	3	125.02	4	189.23
Jan 11–21, 2021	(United States) 2021 U.S. Championships	4	65.81	2	134.71	3	200.52
Mar 22–28, 2021	(Sweden) 2021 World Championships	6	64.94	9	120.37	9	185.31

Results in the 2021–22 season
Date	Event	SP		FS		Total	
Date	Event	P	Score	P	Score	P	Score
Sep 16–18, 2021	(Canada) 2021 CS Autumn Classic International	3	59.58	5	111.06	3	170.64
Oct 7–10, 2021	(Finland) 2021 CS Finlandia Trophy	6	64.98	3	128.02	3	193.00
Oct 29–31, 2021	2021 Skate Canada International	6	61.68	2	128.22	3	189.90
Nov 12–14, 2021	(Japan) 2021 NHK Trophy	4	70.75	4	132.04	4	202.79
Jan 3–9, 2022	(United States) 2022 U.S. Championships	1	79.39	1	145.84	1	225.23
Feb 18–19, 2022	(China) 2022 Winter Olympics	7	74.13	9	123.92	8	198.05
Mar 21–27, 2022	(France) 2022 World Championships	2	75.85	–	–	–	WD

=== Singles skating ===
Results in the 2010–11 season
Date	Event	SP		FS		Total	
Date	Event	P	Score	P	Score	P	Score
Jan 20–27, 2011	(United States) 2011 U.S. Junior Championships	7	48.35	4	89.09	6	137.44

Results in the 2011–12 season
Date	Event	SP		FS		Total	
Date	Event	P	Score	P	Score	P	Score
Aug 31 – Sep 3, 2011	2011 JGP Latvia	3	49.14	7	83.81	6	132.95
Sep 21–24, 2011	2011 JGP Romania	5	44.99	4	80.17	5	125.16
Jan 22–29, 2012	(United States) 2012 U.S. Junior Championships	3	51.80	2	103.68	2	155.48

Results in the 2012–13 season
Date	Event	SP		FS		Total	
Date	Event	P	Score	P	Score	P	Score
Sep 26–28, 2013	2013 JGP France	4	51.31	5	85.20	5	136.51
Jan 20–27, 2013	(United States) 2013 U.S. Championships	11	50.83	12	99.96	12	150.79

Results in the 2013–14 season
Date	Event	SP		FS		Total	
Date	Event	P	Score	P	Score	P	Score
Sep 26–28, 2013	(Germany) 2013 Nebelhorn Trophy	3	57.87	2	104.52	3	162.39
Jan 5–12, 2014	(United States) 2014 U.S. Championships	5	61.45	16	90.19	12	151.64

Results in the 2014–15 season
Date	Event	SP		FS		Total	
Date	Event	P	Score	P	Score	P	Score
Oct 1–5, 2014	(Slovakia) 2014 CS Ondrej Nepela Trophy	2	54.05	5	88.90	3	142.95
Nov 7–9, 2014	2014 Cup of China	11	39.80	9	85.01	10	124.81
Nov 14–16, 2014	(Russia) 2014 Rostelecom Cup	5	57.18	9	93.72	8	150.90
Jan 18–25, 2015	(United States) 2015 U.S. Championships	14	54.35	11	104.59	14	158.94

Results in the 2015–16 season
Date	Event	SP		FS		Total	
Date	Event	P	Score	P	Score	P	Score
Jan 15–24, 2016	(United States) 2016 U.S. Championships	13	48.35	15	83.54	14	131.89
