= ISU Challenger Series =

Annual figure skating competition series

- Status: Active
- Frequency: Annual
- Inaugurated: 2014–15 ISU Challenger Series
- Previous event: 2025–26 Challenger Series
- Next event: 2026–27 Challenger Series
- Organizer: International Skating Union

The ISU Challenger Series is a series of ten international figure skating competitions sanctioned by the International Skating Union (ISU) and organized by ISU member nations. The series was introduced in 2014; its goal is to provide opportunities for senior-level skaters to compete at the international level while also earning points towards the World Standings and Season's World Ranking. The Nebelhorn Trophy, the Nepela Memorial, and the Golden Spin of Zagreb have been regular competitions in the series since the beginning, as was the Finlandia Trophy until 2024. Skaters and teams are eligible to compete in up to three Challenger Series events each season, and their top two scores are combined to calculate their total Challenger Series scores.

== History ==
The International Skating Union Council officially voted to create the Challenger Series at its February 2014 meeting. Its stated goal is to ensure a consistent organization and structure within a series of international competitions and to provide opportunities for senior-level skaters to compete at the international level while earning points towards the World Standings and Season's World Ranking. The original criteria for Challenger Series events were published in April 2014. When an event is held as part of the Challenger Series, it must host at least three of the four disciplines (men's singles, women's singles, pair skating, and ice dance), and representatives from at least twelve different member nations. The minimum number of entrants required for each discipline was fifteen skaters each in men's and women's singles, eight teams in pair skating, and ten teams in ice dance. Each member nation is eligible to enter up to three skaters or teams per discipline in each competition. The eleven inaugural competitions were announced in June 2014. Modified criteria were released in August 2014. The minimum number of required entrants was lowered to eight skaters each in men's singles and women's singles, five teams in pair skating, and six teams in ice dance. The 2014 Triglav Trophy was ultimately dropped from the schedule, resulting in a series composed of ten events.

Slate of 2014 ISU Challenger Series competitions
Date	Event	Location
September 10–14	(United States) 2014 U.S. International Classic	Salt Lake City, Utah, United States
September 18–21	(Italy) 2014 Lombardia Trophy	Sesto San Giovanni, Italy
September 25–27	(Germany) 2014 Nebelhorn Trophy	Oberstdorf, Germany
October 2–5	(Slovakia) 2014 Ondrej Nepela Trophy	Bratislava, Slovakia
October 9–12	(Finland) 2014 Finlandia Trophy	Espoo, Finland
October 15–18	(Canada) 2014 Autumn Classic International	Barrie, Ontario, Canada
November 5–9	(Latvia) 2014 Volvo Open Cup	Riga, Latvia
November 11–16	(Austria) 2014 Ice Challenge	Graz, Austria
November 21–24	(Poland) 2014 Warsaw Cup	Warsaw, Poland
December 4–7	(Croatia) 2014 Golden Spin of Zagreb	Zagreb, Croatia

In February 2016, the ISU declared that the Nebelhorn Trophy, the Finlandia Trophy, the Ondrej Nepela Trophy, and the Golden Spin of Zagreb would constitute a "core group" of Challenger Series events in recognition of their long-standing tradition. The ISU also mandated that one Challenger Series event each season must be held in either Canada or the United States. Beyond that, member nations were invited to apply for the remaining five host slots. While member nations are still limited to sending a maximum of three skaters or teams per discipline to each event, host nations can enter an unlimited number of entrants in their own events. Additionally, each skater or team is limited to participating in at most three Challenger Series events each season.

A full slate of competitions was originally scheduled for the 2020 Challenger Series; however, all but two of the events – the 2020 Nebelhorn Trophy and the 2020 Budapest Trophy – were ultimately cancelled due to the COVID-19 pandemic. On July 13, 2020, the ISU announced that any remaining Challenger Series events would be treated as separate individual competitions rather than part of a series. As a result, no Challenger Series ranking would be determined and no prize money distributed at the end of the series, although skaters could still earn Challenger Series points to apply toward their world rankings. The ISU revised their decision on August 3, announcing that world ranking points would not be awarded due to the limited nature of the competitions.

In April 2026, the ISU announced that the Golden Spin of Zagreb, the Nebelhorn Trophy, and the Nepela Memorial would again be included in a core group of Challenger Series events, along with one competition from either Canada or the United States.

== Events ==
The ISU Challenger Series has included the following competitions:

- Asian Open Figure Skating Trophy: Nations in Southeast Asia rotate as host nation each year. The inaugural edition was held in 2007 in Taipei City. The Asian Open Trophy was a Challenger Series event in 2018 and 2019. The Asian Open Figure Skating Classic, scheduled to be hosted by the Chinese Taipei Skating Union in Taipei City, was originally intended to be a Challenger Series event in 2019. However, in July 2019, the ISU revoked the Chinese Taipei Skating Union's right to hold a Challenger Series event, and instead granted the rights to the Asian Open Trophy, which was hosted that year in Dongguan, China. The Asian Open Trophy was intended to be a Challenger Series event in 2021; however, as only the men's and women's singles events featured international participants and the total number of ISU member nations represented at the event only totaled nine, it did not meet the criteria to qualify for Challenger Series status.
- Autumn Classic International: The Autumn Classic International was organized and hosted by Skate Canada. The inaugural edition coincided with the launch of the Challenger Series in 2014 and was held in Barrie, Ontario. The Autumn Classic International was a Challenger Series event several times between 2014 and 2023, although no competition was held in 2020 due to the COVID-19 pandemic. The competition was last held in 2023 in Montreal.
- Budapest Trophy: The Budapest Trophy is organized and hosted by the Hungarian National Skating Federation at the Vasas Jégcentrum in Budapest. The inaugural edition was intended to be the sixth event of the 2020 Challenger Series; however, all but two of the events (the Nebelhorn Trophy and the Budapest Trophy) were ultimately cancelled due to the COVID-19 pandemic. The competition was held under strict conditions for admittance. The Budapest Trophy has been held every year since, although the 2021 and 2025 editions were not part of the Challenger Series.
- Cranberry Cup International: The Cranberry Cup International is organized and hosted by U.S. Figure Skating at the Skating Club of Boston in Norwood, Massachusetts. The inaugural edition was held in 2021; however, it did not become a Challenger Series event until 2024. The Cranberry Cup International is held in conjunction with the John Nicks Pairs Challenge – the former hosts the men's and women's events, while the latter hosts the pairs event – and the two competitions constitute U.S. Figure Skating's contribution to the Challenger Series.
- Cup of Tyrol: The Cup of Tyrol was organized and hosted by the Union Eislaufschule Innsbruck and Skate Austria at the Tyrolean Ice Arena in Innsbruck. The event was held from 2016 to 2019. It was intended to be the ninth event of the 2020 Challenger Series; however, it was ultimately cancelled due to the COVID-19 pandemic. The 2019 iteration was the last one held.
- Denis Ten Memorial Challenge: The Denis Ten Memorial Challenge is organized and hosted by the Denis Ten Foundation and the Kazakhstan Skating Union. It is named in honor of Denis Ten, a former figure skater who competed internationally for Kazakhstan. The inaugural edition was held in 2019 in Almaty. The competition was cancelled in 2020 due to the COVID-19 pandemic. In 2021, the Denis Ten Memorial Challenge was the seventh event of the Challenger Series, and it has been a Challenger Series event every year since.
- Denkova-Staviski Cup: The Denkova-Staviski Cup is organized and hosted by the Bulgarian Skating Federation and the Denkova-Staviski Skating Club at the Winter Sports Palace in Sofia. The competition debuted in 2012, and is named in honor of Albena Denkova and Maxim Staviski, who competed internationally in ice dance for Bulgaria. In 2015, the Denkova-Staviski Cup was the sixth event of the Challenger Series. It has been held every year since 2012, except for 2020 and 2021, when it was cancelled due to the COVID-19 pandemic.
- Finlandia Trophy: The Finlandia Trophy was organized and hosted by Skating Finland. The competition debuted in 1995 in Helsinki, and when the ISU launched the Challenger Series in 2014, the Finlandia Trophy was one of the inaugural competitions. The Finlandia Trophy was a Challenger Series event consistently through 2023, except in 2020, when it was cancelled due to the COVID-19 pandemic. Following the 2022 Russian invasion of Ukraine, the ISU ordered that no international competitions be held in Russia or Belarus. Therefore, the Rostelecom Cup, which had been scheduled for November, was cancelled. Finland was chosen to host the replacement event: the Grand Prix of Espoo. Finland hosted both the Grand Prix of Espoo and the Finlandia Trophy in 2022 and 2023, but beginning in 2024, Skating Finland bestowed the Finlandia Trophy name on the Grand Prix event. Therefore, the last installment of the Finlandia Trophy as a Challenger Series event took place in 2023.
- Golden Spin of Zagreb: The Golden Spin of Zagreb is organized and hosted by the Croatian Skating Federation at the Klizalište Velesajem in Zagreb. The competition debuted in 1967 when Zagreb was part of Yugoslavia, but no competition was held in 1991 owing to the Croatian War of Independence. The Golden Spin of Zagreb continued as a Croatian event beginning in 1992. When the ISU launched the Challenger Series in 2014, the Golden Spin of Zagreb was one of the inaugural competitions. It has been a Challenger Series event ever since, except for 2020, when it was cancelled due to the COVID-19 pandemic.
- Ice Challenge: The Ice Challenge – held in 2021 as the Cup of Austria – is organized and hosted by the Grazer Eislaufverein and Skate Austria at the Eisstadion Liebenau in Graz. The competition debuted as an international event in 2009; prior to that, it had been a national event called the Leo-Scheu-Gedächtnislaufen, named in honor of Leo Scheu, the first president of the Grazer Eislaufverein. When the ISU launched the Challenger Series in 2014, the Ice Challenge was one of the inaugural competitions. The Ice Challenge has been held several times since 2014, but was a Challenger Series event only in 2015, 2021, and 2022. It was scheduled to be a Challenger Series event in 2023 before the Grazer Eislaufverein cancelled the competition.
- Ice Star: The Ice Star – originally called the Minsk-Arena Ice Star – was organized and hosted by the Skating Union of Belarus at the Minsk-Arena in Minsk. The competition debuted in 2012, and was a Challenger Series event twice during its history: in 2017 and 2019. Following the 2022 Russian invasion of Ukraine, the ISU banned all athletes and officials from Russia and Belarus from participating at any international competitions. As such, the 2021 Ice Star was the last iteration of the competition to be held.
- Inge Solar Memorial: The Inge Solar Memorial/Alpen Trophy was a one-time event, organized and hosted by Skate Austria in 2018 at the OlympiaWorld in Innsbruck, and was part of the 2018 Challenger Series. It was named in honor of Inge Solar, a former figure skater and coach for Austria.
- John Nicks Pairs Challenge: The John Nick Pairs Challenge is organized and hosted by the Skating Club of New York and U.S. Figure Skating at the Sky Rink at Chelsea Piers in New York City, New York. The competition debuted in 2021, and is named in honor of John Nicks, a retired British figure skater who worked as a figure skating coach in the United States for nearly four decades. In 2024, it became part of the Challenger Series. The John Nicks Pairs Challenge is held in conjunction with the Cranberry Cup International – the former hosts the pairs event, while the latter hosts the men's and women's events – and the two competitions constitute U.S. Figure Skating's contribution to the Challenger Series.
- Kinoshita Group Cup: The Kinoshita Group Cup is organized and hosted by the Japan Skating Federation, and was first held as part of the 2025 Challenger Series.
- Lombardia Trophy: The Lombardia Trophy is organized and hosted by the Italian Ice Sports Federation. The competition debuted in 2013 in Sesto San Giovanni, and when the ISU launched the Challenger Series in 2014, the Lombardia Trophy was one of the inaugural competitions. The Lombardia Trophy has been a Challenger Series event ten times during its history as of 2025. No competition was held in 2020 due to the COVID-19 pandemic, although it had already been left off the slate of competitions for the 2020 Challenger Series. From 2013 to 2015, the competition was held in Sesto San Giovanni; since 2016, it has been held in Bergamo.
- Mordovian Ornament: The Mordovian Ornament was a one-time event, organized and hosted by the Figure Skating Federation of Russia in 2015 in Saransk, and was part of the 2015 Challenger Series.
- Nebelhorn Trophy: The Nebelhorn Trophy is organized and hosted by the German Ice Skating Union at the Eissportzentrum Oberstdorf in Oberstdorf. The competition debuted in 1968, and is named after the Nebelhorn, a nearby mountain. When the ISU launched the Challenger Series in 2014, the Nebelhorn Trophy was one of the inaugural competitions. It has been a Challenger Series every year since.
- Nepela Memorial: The Nepela Memorial – originally called the Ondrej Nepela Memorial – is organized and hosted by the Slovak Figure Skating Association at the Ondrej Nepela Arena in Bratislava. The competition debuted in 1993 and is named in honor of Ondrej Nepela, a former Slovak figure skater who competed internationally for Czechoslovakia. When the ISU launched the Challenger Series in 2014, the Nepela Memorial – at that point called the Ondrej Nepela Trophy – was one of the inaugural competitions. The Nepela Memorial has been a Challenger Series event every year since, except for 2020 and 2021, when the competitions were cancelled due to the COVID-19 pandemic.
- Tallinn Trophy: The Tallinn Trophy is organized and hosted by the Estonian Skating Union at the Tondiraba Ice Hall in Tallinn. It debuted in 2002 as a regional competition, before expanding as an international event in 2011 and joining the Challenger Series in 2015. The Tallinn Trophy was a Challenger Series event from 2015 through 2018, and again beginning in 2024. Due to the COVID-19 pandemic, the 2020 Tallinn Trophy was held exclusively for skaters in Estonia.
- Trialeti Trophy: The Trialeti Trophy is organized and hosted by the Georgian Figure Skating Union, and was first held as part of the 2025 Challenger Series at the Ice Palace Tbilisi in Tbilisi.
- Trophée Métropole Nice Côte d'Azur: The Trophée Métropole Nice Côte d'Azur is organized and hosted by the French Federation of Ice Sports and the Nice Baie des Anges Association at the Palais des sports Jean-Bouin in Nice. Originally known as the International Cup of Nice, it was held from 1995 to 2017; and then returned in 2021 with its new name. It was a Challenger Series event in 2024.
- Ukrainian Open: The Ukrainian Open, organized by the Ukrainian Figure Skating Federation, was scheduled to be held in November 2016 in Kyiv. However, the event was cancelled.
- U.S. International Figure Skating Classic: The U.S. International Figure Skating Classic was organized and hosted by U.S. Figure Skating. The competition debuted in 2012 in Salt Lake City, and when the ISU launched the Challenger Series in 2014, the U.S. International Classic was one of the inaugural competitions. It was a Challenger Series event from 2014 through 2019, and again in 2022. No competition was held in 2020 due to the COVID-19 pandemic, although it had already been left off the slate of competitions for the 2020 Challenger Series. The U.S. International Classic returned in 2021, hosted by the Skating Club of Boston at their new facility in Norwood, Massachusetts. Although the 2022 installment in Lake Placid was held as a Challenger Series event, it was also the last installment of the U.S. International Classic to be held.
- Volvo Open Cup: The Volvo Open Cup is organized and hosted by the Kristal Ice Figure Skating Club and the Latvian Figure Skating Association at the Volvo Sport Center in Riga. It was a Challenger Series event in 2014, for what was the Volvo Open Cup's twenty-fifth anniversary.
- Warsaw Cup: The Warsaw Cup is organized and hosted by the Polish Figure Skating Association at the Arena COS Torwar in Warsaw. The inaugural edition of the Warsaw Cup was held in 2002, and was exclusively a junior-level competition until 2010, when senior-level events began to be hosted as well. When the ISU launched the Challenger Series in 2014, the Warsaw Cup was one of the inaugural competitions. Now exclusively a senior-level competition, the Warsaw Cup was a Challenger Series event from 2014 to 2017. No competition was held in 2020 due to the COVID-19 pandemic. The competition returned in 2021 and has been a Challenger Series event ever since.

== Table of events ==
Color key
This event was held as part of the Challenger Series.
This event was held, but was not part of the Challenger Series.
This event was cancelled.

Challenger Series seasons
Competition	2014	2015	2016	2017	2018	2019	2020	2021	2022	2023	2024	2025	2026
Asian Open Trophy	Not a Challenger Series event				Challenger Series		Cancelled	Not a Challenger Series event					
(Canada) Autumn Classic Int'l	Challenger Series	Not a Challenger Series event	Challenger Series				Cancelled	Challenger Series		Challenger Series			
(Hungary) Budapest Trophy							Challenger Series	Not a Challenger Series event	Challenger Series			Not a Challenger Series event	Challenger Series
(United States) Cranberry Cup Int'l								Not a Challenger Series event			Challenger Series		
(Austria) Cup of Tyrol			Not a Challenger Series event				Cancelled						
(Kazakhstan) Denis Ten Memorial Challenge						Not a Challenger Series event	Cancelled	Challenger Series					
(Bulgaria) Denkova-Staviski Cup	Not a Challenger Series event	Challenger Series	Not a Challenger Series event				Cancelled		Not a Challenger Series event				
(Finland) Finlandia Trophy	Challenger Series						Cancelled	Challenger Series			Not a Challenger Series event		
(Croatia) Golden Spin of Zagreb	Challenger Series						Cancelled	Challenger Series					
(Austria) Ice Challenge	Challenger Series			Not a Challenger Series event				Challenger Series		Cancelled	Not a Challenger Series event		Challenger Series
(Belarus) Ice Star	Not a Challenger Series event			Challenger Series	Not a Challenger Series event	Challenger Series	Not a Challenger Series event						
(Austria) Inge Solar Memorial					Challenger Series								
(United States) John Nicks Pairs Challenge								Not a Challenger Series event			Challenger Series		
(Japan) Kinoshita Group Cup												Challenger Series	
(Italy) Lombardia Trophy	Challenger Series	Not a Challenger Series event	Challenger Series				Cancelled	Challenger Series					
(Russia) Mordovian Ornament		Challenger Series											
(Germany) Nebelhorn Trophy	Challenger Series												
(Slovakia) Nepela Memorial	Challenger Series						Cancelled		Challenger Series				
(Estonia) Tallinn Trophy	Not a Challenger Series event	Challenger Series				Not a Challenger Series event					Challenger Series		
(Georgia (country)) Trialeti Trophy												Challenger Series	
(France) Trophée Métropole Nice	Not a Challenger Series event						Cancelled	Not a Challenger Series event			Challenger Series	Not a Challenger Series event	
(Ukraine) Ukrainian Open			Cancelled										
(United States) U.S. Int'l Classic	Challenger Series						Cancelled	Not a Challenger Series event	Challenger Series				
(Latvia) Volvo Open Cup	Challenger Series	Not a Challenger Series event						Not a Challenger Series event					
(Poland) Warsaw Cup	Challenger Series				Not a Challenger Series event	Challenger Series	Cancelled	Challenger Series					
Ref.													

== Top scoring skaters per season ==
=== Men's singles ===
Top ranked skaters in men's singles
Season	Skater	First event	Score	Second event	Score	Total score	Ref.
2014–15	(Czech Republic) Michal Březina	2014 Nebelhorn Trophy	228.48	2014 Golden Spin of Zagreb	239.62	468.10	
2015–16	(United States) Jason Brown	2015 Ondrej Nepela Trophy	239.37	2015 Ice Challenge	240.65	480.02	
2016–17	(United States) Jason Brown	2016 Lombardia Trophy	256.49	2016 U.S. International Classic	254.04	510.53	
2017–18	(Russia) Mikhail Kolyada	2017 Ondrej Nepela Trophy	247.81	2017 Finlandia Trophy	248.50	496.31	
2018–19	(Russia) Mikhail Kolyada	2018 Ondrej Nepela Trophy	274.37	2018 Golden Spin of Zagreb	253.14	527.51	
2019–20	(Russia) Dmitri Aliev	2019 Lombardia Trophy	249.62	2019 Nepela Memorial	255.32	504.94	
2020–21	Limited Challenger Series schedule due to the COVID-19 pandemic						
2021–22	(Russia) Petr Gumennik	2021 Denis Ten Memorial Challenge	263.14	2021 Warsaw Cup	242.91	506.05	
2022–23	(France) Kévin Aymoz	2022 U.S. International Classic	236.17	2022 Warsaw Cup	258.02	494.19	
2023–24	(Switzerland) Lukas Britschgi	2023 Budapest Trophy	246.12	2023 Warsaw Cup	246.22	492.34	
2024–25	(Italy) Daniel Grassl	2024 Denis Ten Memorial Challenge	237.70	2024 Nepela Memorial	267.08	504.78	
2025–26	(Georgia (country)) Nika Egadze	2025 Denis Ten Memorial Challenge	266.90	2025 Trialeti Trophy	261.02	527.92	

=== Women's singles ===
Top ranked skaters in women's singles
Season	Skater	First event	Score	Second event	Score	Total score	Ref.
2014–15	(Russia) Elizaveta Tuktamysheva	2014 Finlandia Trophy	193.31	2014 Warsaw Cup	196.66	389.97	
2015–16	(Russia) Elizaveta Tuktamysheva	2015 Warsaw Cup	192.93	2015 Golden Spin of Zagreb	201.33	394.26	
2016–17	(Russia) Elizaveta Tuktamysheva	2016 Nebelhorn Trophy	185.93	2016 Golden Spin of Zagreb	192.03	377.96	
2017–18	(Italy) Carolina Kostner	2017 Lombardia Trophy	198.36	2017 Finlandia Trophy	193.76	392.12	
2018–19	(Russia) Elizaveta Tuktamysheva	2018 Lombardia Trophy	206.07	2018 Finlandia Trophy	202.85	408.92	
2019–20	(Russia) Elizaveta Tuktamysheva	2019 Lombardia Trophy	214.38	2019 Golden Spin of Zagreb	221.15	435.53	
2020–21	Limited Challenger Series schedule due to the COVID-19 pandemic						
2021–22	(United States) Alysa Liu	2021 Lombardia Trophy	219.24	2021 Nebelhorn Trophy	207.40	426.64	
2022–23	(South Korea) Kim Ye-lim	2022 U.S. International Classic	190.64	2022 Finlandia Trophy	213.97	404.61	
2023–24	(South Korea) Kim Chae-yeon	2023 Lombardia Trophy	180.78	2023 Nepela Memorial	202.26	383.04	
2024–25	(United States) Elyce Lin-Gracey	2024 Cranberry Cup International	193.99	2024 Nebelhorn Trophy	213.33	407.32	
2025–26	(Japan) Mone Chiba	2025 Kinoshita Group Cup	216.59	2025 Nebelhorn Trophy	213.64	430.23	

=== Pairs ===
Top ranked teams in pairs
Season	Team	First event	Score	Second event	Score	Total score	Ref.
2014–15	(United States); Alexa Scimeca; Chris Knierim	2014 U.S. International Classic	163.24	2014 Nebelhorn Trophy	166.10	329.34	
2015–16	(Germany); Aljona Savchenko; Bruno Massot	2015 Tallinn Trophy	214.42	2015 Warsaw Cup	209.60	424.02	
2016–17	(Italy); Valentina Marchei; Ondřej Hotárek	2016 Lombardia Trophy	179.56	2016 Warsaw Cup	189.26	368.82	
2017–18	(Russia); Natalia Zabiiako; Alexander Enbert	2017 Lombardia Trophy	196.06	2017 Golden Spin of Zagreb	202.96	399.02	
2018–19	(Russia); Aleksandra Boikova; Dmitrii Kozlovskii	2018 Lombardia Trophy	191.99	2018 Finlandia Trophy	188.54	380.53	
2019–20	(United States); Ashley Cain-Gribble; Timothy LeDuc	2019 U.S. International Classic	205.58	2019 Golden Spin of Zagreb	199.43	405.01	
2020–21	Limited Challenger Series schedule due to the COVID-19 pandemic						
2021–22	(Russia); Evgenia Tarasova; Vladimir Morozov	2021 Finlandia Trophy	213.72	2021 Golden Spin of Zagreb	228.49	442.21	
2022–23	(Italy); Rebecca Ghilardi; Filippo Ambrosini	2022 U.S. International Classic	189.22	2022 Warsaw Cup	184.21	373.43	
2023–24	(Germany); Minerva Fabienne Hase; Nikita Volodin	2023 Lombardia Trophy	194.52	2023 Nebelhorn Trophy	194.96	389.48	
2024–25	(United States); Ellie Kam; Daniel O'Shea	2024 John Nicks International	191.62	2024 Nebelhorn Trophy	184.38	376.00	
2025–26	(Japan); Riku Miura; Ryuichi Kihara	2025 Kinoshita Group Cup	222.94	2025 Nebelhorn Trophy	221.03	443.97	

=== Ice dance ===
Top ranked teams in ice dance
Season	Team	First event	Score	Second event	Score	Total score	Ref.
2014–15	(United States); Maia Shibutani; Alex Shibutani	2014 Ondrej Nepela Trophy	162.98	2014 Ice Challenge	166.34	329.32	
2015–16	(Italy); Charlène Guignard; Marco Fabbri	2015 Warsaw Cup	169.72	2015 Golden Spin of Zagreb	172.28	342.00	
2016–17	(Russia); Ekaterina Bobrova; Dmitri Soloviev	2016 Ondrej Nepela Memorial	178.84	2016 Warsaw Cup	183.60	362.44	
2017–18	(Russia); Ekaterina Bobrova; Dmitri Soloviev	2017 Ondrej Nepela Trophy	181.92	2017 Golden Spin of Zagreb	186.66	368.58	
2018–19	(Canada); Piper Gilles; Paul Poirier	2018 Golden Spin of Zagreb	201.27	2018 Nebelhorn Trophy	194.12	395.39	
2019–20	(Italy); Charlène Guignard; Marco Fabbri	2019 Lombardia Trophy	202.10	2019 Golden Spin of Zagreb	202.18	404.28	
2020–21	Limited Challenger Series schedule due to the COVID-19 pandemic						
2021–22	(Italy); Charlène Guignard; Marco Fabbri	2021 Lombardia Trophy	205.36	2021 Cup of Austria	208.88	414.24	
2022–23	(United Kingdom); Lilah Fear; Lewis Gibson	2022 U.S. International Classic	190.80	2022 Nebelhorn Trophy	206.60	397.40	
2023–24	(United Kingdom); Lilah Fear; Lewis Gibson	2023 Nebelhorn Trophy	207.84	2023 Nepela Memorial	200.46	408.30	
2024–25	(United Kingdom); Lilah Fear; Lewis Gibson	2024 Nebelhorn Trophy	207.01	2024 Nepela Memorial	210.65	417.66	
2025–26	(Georgia (country)); Diana Davis; Gleb Smolkin	2025 Denis Ten Memorial Challenge	193.14	2025 Trialeti Trophy	203.39	396.53	
