= 2015 U.S. Figure Skating Championships =

Figure skating competition

- Type: National Championship
- Date: January 18 – 25
- Season: 2014–15
- Location: Greensboro, North Carolina
- Venue: Greensboro Coliseum

Champions
- Men's singles: Jason Brown
- Ladies' singles: Ashley Wagner
- Pairs: Alexa Scimeca / Chris Knierim
- Ice dance: Madison Chock / Evan Bates
- Previous: 2014 U.S. Championships
- Next: 2016 U.S. Championships

The 2015 U.S. Figure Skating Championships were held at the Greensboro Coliseum in Greensboro, North Carolina from January 18–25, 2015. Medals were awarded in the disciplines of men's singles, ladies singles, pair skating, and ice dancing at the senior, junior, novice, intermediate and juvenile levels. The results were part of the U.S. selection criteria for the 2015 World Championships and 2015 Four Continents Championships.

== Qualifying events ==
Competitors qualified at regional and sectional competitions held from October to November 2014 or earned a bye. At the end of November, U.S. Figure Skating published the list of skaters who had qualified for the U.S. Championships.

Date	Event	Location	Details
October 5–8, 2014	2015 Northwest Pacific Regionals	Wenatchee, Washington	Results
October 5–8, 2014	2015 Upper Great Lakes Regionals	Saint Paul, Minnesota	Results
October 5–8, 2014	2015 South Atlantic Regionals	Alpharetta, Georgia	Results
October 11–14, 2014	2015 Southwest Pacific Regionals	Ontario, California	Results
October 11–14, 2014	2015 Eastern Great Lakes Regionals	Traverse City, Michigan	Results
October 11–14, 2014	2015 North Atlantic Regionals	Hackensack, New Jersey	Results
October 18–21, 2014	2015 New England Regionals	Burlington, Vermont	Results
October 18–21, 2014	2015 Central Pacific Regionals	Salt Lake City, Utah	Results
October 18–21, 2014	2015 Southwestern Regionals	Fort Collins, Colorado	Results
November 19–23, 2014	2015 Eastern Sectionals	Wake Forest, North Carolina	Results
November 19–23, 2014	2015 Midwestern Sectionals	Geneva, Illinois	Results
November 19–23, 2014	2015 Pacific Coast Sectionals	Spokane, Washington	Results

== Medal summary ==
=== Senior ===
Discipline	Gold	Silver	Bronze	Pewter
Men	Jason Brown	Adam Rippon	Joshua Farris	Max Aaron
Ladies	Ashley Wagner	Gracie Gold	Karen Chen	Polina Edmunds
Pairs	Alexa Scimeca / Chris Knierim	Haven Denney / Brandon Frazier	Tarah Kayne / Danny O'Shea	Madeline Aaron / Max Settlage
Ice dancing	Madison Chock / Evan Bates	Maia Shibutani / Alex Shibutani	Madison Hubbell / Zachary Donohue	Kaitlin Hawayek / Jean-Luc Baker

=== Junior ===
Discipline	Gold	Silver	Bronze	Pewter
Men	Andrew Torgashev	Kevin Shum	Paolo Borromeo	Alexei Krasnozhon
Ladies	Bradie Tennell	Olivia Serafini	Vivian Le	Elena Taylor
Pairs	Caitlin Fields / Ernie Utah Stevens	Chelsea Liu / Brian Johnson	Olivia Allan / Austin Hale	Lindsay Weinstein / Jacob Simon
Ice dancing	Lorraine McNamara / Quinn Carpenter	Rachel Parsons / Michael Parsons	Elliana Pogrebinsky / Alex Benoit	Holly Moore / Daniel Klaber

=== Novice ===
Discipline	Gold	Silver	Bronze	Pewter
Men	Jonah Barrett	Justin Ly	Kendrick Weston	Daniil Shamis
Ladies	Emily Chan	Akari Nakahara	Nina Ouellette	Anna Grace Davidson
Pairs	Kate Finster / Eric Hartley	Sarah Rose / Joseph Goodpaster	Jacquelyn Green / Rique Newby-Estrella	Vanessa Chen / Robert Przepioski
Ice dancing	Caroline Green / Gordon Green	Katherine Grosul / Cameron Colucci	Emma Gunter / Caleb Wein	Rebecca Lustig / Zachary Milestone

=== Intermediate ===
Discipline	Gold	Silver	Bronze	Pewter
Men	TJ Nyman	Dinh Tran	Alan Wong	Ryan Dunk
Ladies	Kassandra Carpentier	Maxine Marie Bautista	Gia Kokotakis	Ting Cui
Pairs	Elli Kopmar / Jonah Barrett	Sydney Cooke / Nathaniel Dennler	Joanna Hubbart / William Hubbart	Jasmine Fendi / Joshua Fendi
Ice dancing	Sophia Elder / Christopher Elder	Jillian Moyer / Jarred Druzynski	Molly Cesanek / Maxwell Gart	Cherri Chen / Edward Jahoda

=== Juvenile ===
Discipline	Gold	Silver	Bronze	Pewter
Men	Daniel Turchin	Chase Finster	Joseph Kang	Henry Privett-Mendoza
Ladies	Sophia Chouinard	Emilia Murdock	Jacqueline Lee	Isabella Miller
Pairs	Altice Sollazo / Paul Yeung	Paige Ruggeri / Steven Rossi	Dana Vulaj / Keyton Bearinger	Jessica Sassano / Ethan Hall
Ice dancing	Elizabeth Tkachenko / Alexei Kiliakov	Byrdee Darling / Rebel Rodriguez Avellan	Juliette Shadid / Lucas Shadid	Jordan Lin / Morgan Sletten

== Senior results ==
=== Senior men ===
Rank	Name	Total	SP		FS	
1	Jason Brown	274.98	1	93.36	2	181.62
2	Adam Rippon	272.48	5	84.71	1	187.77
3	Joshua Farris	267.98	2	90.40	3	177.58
4	Max Aaron	259.19	4	85.78	4	173.41
5	Jeremy Abbott	258.29	3	89.93	5	168.36
6	Ross Miner	249.28	6	82.25	6	167.03
7	Douglas Razzano	233.42	10	74.01	7	159.41
8	Nathan Chen	230.99	8	76.20	8	154.79
9	Grant Hochstein	230.28	9	75.70	9	154.58
10	Richard Dornbush	218.27	7	79.24	11	142.84
11	Alexander Johnson	218.27	12	68.46	10	149.81
12	Sean Rabbitt	211.24	11	71.39	12	139.85
13	Jordan Moeller	206.00	14	67.81	13	138.19
14	Timothy Dolensky	193.38	13	68.41	14	124.97
15	Patrick Rupp	178.42	17	56.29	15	122.13
16	Philip Warren	172.04	15	61.13	16	110.91
17	Shotaro Omori	166.41	18	55.60	17	110.81
18	Jimmy Ma	164.74	16	59.09	18	105.65
19	Robert Przepioski	144.88	19	50.07	20	94.81
20	Sebastien Payannet	141.40	20	42.26	19	99.14
WD	Stephen Carriere					

=== Senior ladies ===
Rank	Name	Total	SP		FS	
1	Ashley Wagner	221.02	1	72.04	1	148.98
2	Gracie Gold	205.54	2	67.02	2	138.52
3	Karen Chen	199.79	6	64.66	3	135.13
4	Polina Edmunds	192.62	3	66.04	4	126.58
5	Samantha Cesario	182.82	11	59.21	5	123.61
6	Mariah Bell	180.25	12	57.35	6	122.90
7	Tyler Pierce	174.90	9	60.28	7	114.62
8	Courtney Hicks	174.33	5	65.01	9	109.32
9	Hannah Miller	168.87	10	59.81	10	109.06
10	Mirai Nagasu	166.63	4	65.28	12	101.35
11	Christina Gao	160.60	18	50.78	8	109.82
12	Leah Keiser	160.56	8	60.89	14	99.67
13	Amber Glenn	159.41	7	63.04	15	96.37
14	Ashley Cain	158.94	14	54.35	11	104.59
15	Angela Wang	151.06	17	51.02	13	100.04
16	Franchesca Chiera	145.73	16	52.91	17	92.82
17	Caroline Zhang	144.00	13	55.40	19	88.60
18	Katie McBeath	138.68	20	45.36	16	93.32
19	Maria Yang	131.40	22	42.79	18	88.61
20	Ashley Shin	129.81	15	53.67	20	76.14
21	Christina Cleveland	115.26	21	45.24	21	70.02
22	Madison Vinci	111.77	19	45.38	22	66.39

=== Senior pairs ===
Rank	Name	Total	SP		FS	
1	Alexa Scimeca / Chris Knierim	210.49	1	74.01	1	136.48
2	Haven Denney / Brandon Frazier	199.92	2	68.38	2	131.54
3	Tarah Kayne / Danny O'Shea	185.31	4	61.56	3	123.75
4	Madeline Aaron / Max Settlage	175.74	7	56.45	4	119.29
5	Jessica Calalang / Zack Sidhu	174.32	6	58.75	5	115.57
6	Marissa Castelli / Mervin Tran	169.14	3	64.24	8	104.90
7	Gretchen Donlan / Nathan Bartholomay	168.05	5	59.81	6	108.24
8	DeeDee Leng / Simon Shnapir	160.29	8	55.03	7	105.26
9	Anya Davidovich / AJ Reiss	142.15	9	49.69	9	92.46
10	Alexandria Shaughnessy / James Morgan	131.20	10	47.51	10	83.69
11	Olivia Oltmanns / Joshua Santillan	116.44	11	41.13	11	75.31
12	Cali Fujimoto / Nicholas Barsi-Rhyne	111.91	12	39.48	12	72.43

=== Senior ice dance ===
Rank	Name	Total	SP		FS	
1	Madison Chock / Evan Bates	185.06	1	73.95	1	111.11
2	Maia Shibutani / Alex Shibutani	181.31	2	73.84	2	107.47
3	Madison Hubbell / Zachary Donohue	164.74	3	65.43	3	99.31
4	Kaitlin Hawayek / Jean-Luc Baker	162.45	4	63.95	4	98.50
5	Anastasia Cannuscio / Colin McManus	156.48	5	61.95	5	94.53
6	Alexandra Aldridge / Daniel Eaton	140.11	6	57.74	6	82.37
7	Danielle Gamelin / Alexander Gamelin	131.28	7	52.53	7	78.75
8	Anastasia Olson / Ian Lorello	129.20	8	51.94	8	77.26
9	Charlotte Maxwell / Ryan Devereaux	122.50	9	50.94	10	71.56
10	Ginna Hoptman / Pavel Filchenkov	120.53	10	47.87	9	72.66
11	Elicia Reynolds / Stephen Reynolds	102.94	11	40.02	11	62.92
12	Kseniya Ponomaryova / Oleg Altukhov	97.87	12	37.64	12	60.23
13	Kristen Nardozzi / Nick Traxler	93.68	13	37.05	13	56.63
14	Tory Patsis / Nathaniel Fast	87.02	15	32.81	14	54.21
15	Ashlyn Gaughan / Cody Lithco	81.74	14	32.82	16	48.92
16	Gabriela Morrell Zucker / Andrejs Sitiks	75.73	17	23.78	15	51.95
17	Pauline Bynum / Jason Deveikis	63.04	16	26.18	17	36.86

== Junior results ==
=== Junior men ===
Rank	Name	Total	SP		FS	
1	Andrew Torgashev	225.24	1	75.61	1	149.63
2	Kevin Shum	193.36	2	64.99	3	128.37
3	Paolo Borromeo	190.30	3	63.71	4	126.59
4	Alexei Krasnozhon	190.22	6	60.52	2	129.70
5	Tomoki Hiwatashi	186.87	5	61.20	5	125.67
6	Spencer Howe	181.79	4	61.44	6	120.35
7	Oleksiy Melnyk	169.82	7	58.67	7	111.15
8	Daniel Kulenkamp	164.07	8	55.24	8	108.83
9	Anthony Boucher	152.91	9	52.61	9	100.30
10	Chase Belmontes	151.15	10	52.26	10	98.89
11	Ben Jalovick	128.61	11	48.95	11	79.66
WD	Tony Lu					

=== Junior ladies ===
Rank	Name	Total	SP		FS	
1	Bradie Tennell	176.36	1	59.38	1	116.98
2	Olivia Serafini	160.00	3	53.24	2	106.76
3	Vivian Le	148.17	7	46.76	5	101.41
4	Elena Taylor	145.31	8	43.21	4	102.10
5	Amy Lin	144.52	4	52.94	6	91.58
6	Rebecca Peng	141.60	11	37.88	3	103.72
7	Brynne McIsaac	135.82	6	48.32	8	87.50
8	Paige Rydberg	133.99	2	53.34	9	80.65
9	Megan Wessenberg	133.52	9	42.94	7	90.58
10	Sarah Feng	128.93	5	48.78	10	80.15
11	Brianna Brazee	108.84	10	38.39	12	70.45
12	Hina Ueno	105.35	12	34.59	11	70.76

=== Junior pairs ===
Rank	Name	Total	SP		FS	
1	Caitlin Fields / Ernie Utah Stevens	155.41	1	57.18	1	98.23
2	Chelsea Liu / Brian Johnson	150.84	2	54.96	2	95.88
3	Olivia Allan / Austin Hale	130.60	4	42.73	3	87.87
4	Lindsay Weinstein / Jacob Simon	123.02	3	43.75	5	79.27
5	Cirinia Gillett / Maximiliano Fernandez	122.32	5	42.22	4	80.10
6	Gabriella Marvaldi / Cody Dolkiewicz	115.28	6	41.85	8	73.43
7	Alyssa McDougal / Paul Schatz	115.24	7	40.81	6	74.43
8	Kay Bergdolt / Miles Addison	113.51	8	40.46	9	73.05
9	Linde LaChance / Kenneth Anderson	111.03	10	36.70	7	74.33
10	Joy Weinberg / Michael Lueck	98.18	9	38.08	10	60.10
11	Kailey Matkin / Justin Highgate-Brutman	94.08	11	34.10	11	59.98

=== Junior ice dance ===
Rank	Name	Total	SD		FD	
1	Lorraine McNamara / Quinn Carpenter	155.39	1	64.16	1	91.23
2	Rachel Parsons / Michael Parsons	144.98	2	60.61	2	84.37
3	Elliana Pogrebinsky / Alex Benoit	141.55	3	58.92	3	82.63
4	Holly Moore / Daniel Klaber	133.07	5	53.53	4	79.54
5	Christina Carreira / Anthony Ponomarenko	131.91	4	55.32	6	76.59
6	Emily Day / Kevin Leahy	126.23	6	50.98	8	75.25
7	Chloe Lewis / Logan Bye	125.65	8	48.18	5	77.47
8	Julia Biechler / Damian Dodge	117.65	11	42.17	7	75.48
9	Gigi Becker / Luca Becker	115.91	7	50.34	10	65.57
10	Karina Manta / Joseph Johnson	114.23	9	45.09	9	69.14
11	Danielle Thomas / Alexander Martin	109.73	10	44.77	11	64.96
12	Maeve Pascoe / Micah Jaffe	100.38	12	41.30	12	59.08

== Novice results ==
=== Novice men ===
Rank	Name	Total	SP		FS	
1	Jonah Barrett	142.48	3	46.72	1	95.76
2	Justin Ly	139.56	1	47.47	2	92.09
3	Kendrick Weston	133.20	2	46.87	3	86.33
4	Daniil Shamis	131.16	4	44.95	4	86.21
5	Benjamin Shou	127.15	7	41.06	5	86.09
6	Peter Liu	122.60	9	38.91	7	83.69
7	Kelvin Li	122.11	11	36.56	6	85.55
8	William Hubbart	122.08	8	41.03	8	81.05
9	Colton Johnson	110.87	5	42.40	9	68.47
10	Ivan Mokhov	105.66	6	41.92	12	63.74
11	Eric Sjoberg	102.50	10	36.65	10	65.85
12	Andrew Uhrig	99.91	12	35.14	11	64.77

=== Novice ladies ===
Rank	Name	Total	SP		FS	
1	Emily Chan	149.25	1	50.97	1	98.28
2	Akari Nakahara	134.63	3	43.98	2	90.65
3	Nina Ouellette	128.55	2	47.23	3	81.32
4	Anna Grace Davidson	118.82	4	40.82	4	78.00
5	Jin Baseman	109.04	5	40.71	6	68.33
6	Haley Beavers	108.44	8	37.56	5	70.88
7	Sarah Nunez	105.78	6	39.12	7	66.66
8	Alexia Paganini	104.03	7	38.06	8	65.97
9	Pooja Kalyan	98.10	11	32.60	10	65.50
10	Lindsay Rosenberg	97.98	12	32.21	9	65.77
11	Ashlee Raymond	95.79	10	33.80	11	61.99
12	Meiryla Findley	83.73	9	36.47	12	47.26

=== Novice pairs ===
Rank	Name	Total	SP		FS	
1	Kate Finster / Eric Hartley	112.91	3	35.11	1	77.80
2	Sarah Rose / Joseph Goodpaster	109.66	6	32.60	2	77.06
3	Jacquelyn Green / Rique Newby-Estrella	106.26	5	32.85	3	73.41
4	Vanessa Chen / Robert Przepioski	105.05	2	36.96	5	68.09
5	Darbie Burke / Griffin Schwab	104.84	1	37.22	7	67.62
6	Megan Griffin / Andrew Civiello	98.42	7	30.54	6	67.88
7	Alexandria Yao / Connor Fleming	98.29	4	34.48	9	63.81
8	Emily Chan / Misha Mitrofanov	98.07	8	29.30	4	68.77
9	Sapphire Jaeckel / Matthew Scoralle	93.30	9	28.45	8	64.85
10	Hannah Klopstock / Brandon Kozlowski	86.46	10	28.45	10	58.01
11	Alexandra Iovanna / Matthew Rounis	84.07	11	26.53	11	57.54
12	Juliette Erickson / Nathan Grundhofer	77.75	12	23.82	12	53.93

=== Novice ice dance ===
Rank	Name	Total	PD1		PD2		FD	
1	Caroline Green / Gordon Green	111.30	1	21.15	1	24.10	1	66.05
2	Katherine Grosul / Cameron Colucci	101.03	7	16.63	2	19.96	2	64.44
3	Emma Gunter / Caleb Wein	98.19	2	19.54	6	17.42	4	61.23
4	Rebecca Lustig / Zachary Milestone	95.70	4	18.54	10	14.97	3	62.19
5	Cassidy Klopstock / Logan Leonesio	92.80	3	19.02	7	16.97	7	56.81
6	Eleanor Babaev / Scott Wenner	92.66	8	15.85	4	19.24	6	57.57
7	Coco Becker / Val Katsman	90.12	6	17.53	5	19.03	8	53.56
8	Alexis Middleton / Michael Valdez	88.75	9	15.22	9	15.37	5	58.16
9	Elizabeth Addas / Jonathan Schultz	82.57	5	17.70	3	19.62	11	45.25
10	Rachel Gart / Lance Stanley	79.62	10	13.43	8	16.00	9	50.19
11	Kimberly Wei / Ilias Fourati	72.93	11	13.36	11	14.04	10	45.53
12	Heidi Washburn / Jeffrey Fishman	71.34	12	12.68	12	13.67	12	44.99

== Intermediate results ==
=== Intermediate men ===
Rank	Name	Total points	SP		FS	
1	TJ Nyman	104.70	1	37.35	1	67.35
2	Dinh Tran	100.41	2	36.26	2	64.15
3	Alan Wong	89.50	5	34.42	3	58.08
4	Ryan Dunk	89.09	4	35.14	4	53.95
5	David Shapiro	83.37	6	31.06	6	52.31
6	Max Wang	82.08	8	29.97	7	52.11
7	Max Lake	80.33	11	27.00	5	53.33
8	Ryan Bedard	79.55	9	27.41	8	49.81
9	Paul Yeung	78.80	10	29.16	9	49.64
10	Luke Ferrante	78.38	3	35.50	12	42.88
11	Jordan Evans	77.36	7	30.11	10	47.25
12	Jun-Hong Chen	66.17	12	22.63	11	43.53

=== Intermediate ladies ===
Rank	Name	Total points	SP		FS	
1	Kassandra Carpentier	112.24	1	42.04	2	72.04
2	Maxine Marie Bautista	105.84	7	30.74	1	75.10
3	Gia Kokotakis	99.43	2	35.93	3	63.50
4	Ting Cui	95.30	3	33.85	5	61.45
5	Lara Annunziata	92.84	4	33.75	6	59.09
6	Jenna Shi	91.59	5	32.85	7	58.75
7	Ashley Lin	90.81	11	28.93	4	61.88
8	Liza Hayes	88.05	9	30.25	8	57.80
9	Cheyenne King	85.94	10	29.33	9	56.61
10	Sierra Venetta	84.14	8	30.46	10	83.68
11	Nhi Do	84.12	6	31.57	11	52.55
12	Diana Zhu	80.31	12	28.15	12	52.16

=== Intermediate pairs ===
Rank	Name	Total points	SP		FS	
1	Elli Kopmar / Jonah Barrett	97.52	4	32.82	1	64.70
2	Sydney Cooke / Nathaniel Dennler	96.29	3	33.92	3	62.37
3	Joanna Hubbart / William Hubbart	95.16	5	31.88	2	63.28
4	Jasmine Fendi / Joshua Fendi	93.78	1	34.48	4	59.30
5	Greta Crafoord / John Crafoord	93.07	2	34.24	5	58.83
6	Jade Esposito / Nathan Rensing	82.79	6	29.60	6	53.19
7	Devin Pascoe / Samuel Parks	77.99	7	28.90	7	49.90
8	Annabel Kim / Jonathan Kim	70.78	8	25.23	8	45.55
9	Sabrina Piliero / Davis Tong	68.95	9	24.57	9	44.38
10	Carlie Quesada / Adrian Shin	62.77	11	18.50	10	44.27
11	Cecilia Wright / William Wright	57.59	10	21.56	11	36.03
12	Danielle Neuberger / Kristion Major	36.60	12	12.31	12	24.29

=== Intermediate ice dance ===
Rank	Name	Total	PD1		PD2		FD	
1	Sophia Elder / Christopher Elder	103.53	1	23.72	1	24.57	1	55.24
2	Jillian Moyer / Jarred Druzynski	89.25	3	19.06	2	19.34	2	50.85
3	Molly Cesanek / Maxwell Gart	83.14	4	17.37	6	16.83	3	48.94
4	Cherri Chen / Edward Jahoda	83.09	2	22.16	3	18.93	5	42.00
5	Allie Rose / Spencer Emerson	75.57	6	16.97	5	18.19	7	40.41
6	Amanda Miller / Nikolay Usanov	74.99	8	14.19	9	16.21	4	44.59
7	Josephine Hagan / JT Michel	72.54	5	17.30	7	16.80	8	38.44
8	Gianna Buckley / Caleb Niva	70.32	9	13.85	11	15.31	6	41.16
9	Claire Purnell / Lucas Purnell	69.69	7	14.81	4	18.39	11	36.49
10	Ashley Klotz / Palmer Middlekauff	65.48	10	12.24	8	16.51	10	36.73
11	Kaitlyn Moshang / Cory Fraiman	64.89	11	7.16	10	15.93	9	29.80
12	Cricket Darling / Racer Rodriguez Avellan	53.17	12	9.49	12	10.23	12	33.45

== Juvenile results ==
=== Juvenile boys ===
Rank	Name	Total points
1	Daniel Turchin	47.48
2	Chase Finster	46.82
3	Joseph Kang	45.50
4	Henry Privett-Mendoza	45.46
5	Jeffrey Chen	43.07
6	Maxwell Gart	42.61
7	Nikita Romanov	42.56
8	Maxim Zharkov	41.94
9	Ilia Malinin	40.00
10	Isaac Jun	39.77
11	Daniel Tioumentsev	38.99
12	Lawrence Winters	31.82

=== Juvenile girls ===
Rank	Name	Total points
1	Sophia Chouinard	52.81
2	Emilia Murdock	50.01
3	Jacqueline Lee	49.72
4	Isabella Miller	49.22
5	Angelina Huang	48.84
6	Madeleine Weiler	48.16
7	Audrey Lu	45.58
8	Nikolett Albrechtovics	45.35
9	Paxton James	43.69
10	Kaia Culotta	42.89
11	Frances Rossiter	42.16
12	Noelle Rosa	41.17

=== Juvenile pairs ===
Rank	Name	Total points
1	Altice Sollazo / Paul Yeung	39.12
2	Paige Ruggeri / Steven Rossi	37.86
3	Dana Vulaj / Keyton Bearinger	36.18
4	Jessica Sassano / Ethan Hall	34.29
5	Kristin Lyle George / Jake Pagano	34.12
6	Erin Song / Eric Song	32.95
7	Megan Audet / Jacob Wineland	32.06
8	Lindsey Stevenson / Franz-Peter Jerosch	31.37
9	Eliana Secunda / Blake Eisenach	31.21
10	Cate Fleming / Jedidiah Isbell	30.13
11	Anastasia Lestina / Benjamin McLemore	28.89
12	Katie Luong / Nathan Luong	25.69

=== Juvenile ice dance ===
Rank	Name	Total points	PD1		PD2		FD	
1	Elizabeth Tkachenko / Alexei Kiliakov	87.50	1	23.16	1	24.70	3	39.64
2	Byrdee Darling / Rebel Rodriguez Avellan	80.69	3	19.73	4	19.16	1	41.80
3	Juliette Shadid / Lucas Shadid	77.32	5	19.22	7	17.71	2	40.39
4	Jordan Lin / Morgan Sletten	75.57	2	20.75	2	19.72	8	35.10
5	Sara Zhao / Howard Zhao	74.45	4	19.54	3	19.26	7	35.65
6	Isabel Blahunka / Will Shawver	73.52	5	17.75	6	16.82	4	37.55
7	Maria Soldatova / Faddey Soldatov	69.87	9	13.31	5	19.13	5	37.43
8	Claire Cain / Andrei Davydov	62.04	7	15.34	9	14.90	10	31.80
9	Valerie Sroka / Samuel Hodman	61.67	11	10.82	8	15.18	5	35.67
10	Paulina Brykalova / Daniel Brykalov	59.81	8	13.92	11	12.13	9	33.76
11	Shin Lei Case / Maxim Zharkov	56.25	10	12.58	10	12.78	11	30.89
12	Tia Gore / Benjamin Klusewitz	39.86	12	10.11	11	8.12	13	21.63
13	Emily Viehouser / Collin Woodall-Williams	39.41	13	6.87	13	7.15	12	25.39

== International team selections ==
=== Four Continents ===
The team for the 2015 Four Continents Championships was announced on January 25, 2015, as follows:

	Men	Ladies	Pairs	Ice dancing
1	Jason Brown	Samantha Cesario	Haven Denney / Brandon Frazier	Madison Chock / Evan Bates
2	Joshua Farris	Polina Edmunds	Tarah Kayne / Danny O'Shea	Kaitlin Hawayek / Jean-Luc Baker
3	Adam Rippon	Gracie Gold	Alexa Scimeca / Chris Knierim	Maia Shibutani / Alex Shibutani
1st alt.	Max Aaron	Mariah Bell	Madeline Aaron / Max Settlage	Madison Hubbell / Zachary Donohue
2nd alt.	Ross Miner	Courtney Hicks	Jessica Calalang / Zack Sidhu	Anastasia Cannuscio / Colin McManus
3rd alt.	Jeremy Abbott	Hannah Miller	DeeDee Leng / Simon Shnapir	Alexandra Aldridge / Daniel Eaton

=== World Junior Championships ===
The team for the 2015 World Junior Championships was announced on January 25, 2015, as follows:

	Men	Ladies	Pairs	Ice dancing
1	Nathan Chen	Karen Chen	Caitlin Fields / Ernie Utah Stevens	Lorraine McNamara / Quinn Carpenter
2	Kevin Shum	Tyler Pierce	Chelsea Liu / Brian Johnson	Rachel Parsons / Michael Parsons
3	Andrew Torgashev			Elliana Pogrebinsky / Alex Benoit
1st alt.	Paolo Borromeo	Bradie Tennell	Olivia Allan / Austin Hale	Holly Moore / Daniel Klaber
2nd alt.	Spencer Howe	Hannah Miller	Lindsay Weinstein / Jacob Simon	Christina Carreira / Anthony Ponomarenko
3rd alt.	Shotaro Omori	Leah Keiser		Emily Day / Kevin Leahy

=== World Championships ===
The team for the 2015 World Championships was announced on January 25, 2015, as follows:

	Men	Ladies	Pairs	Ice dancing
1	Jason Brown	Polina Edmunds	Haven Denney / Brandon Frazier	Madison Chock / Evan Bates
2	Joshua Farris	Gracie Gold	Alexa Scimeca / Chris Knierim	Madison Hubbell / Zachary Donohue
3	Adam Rippon	Ashley Wagner		Maia Shibutani / Alex Shibutani
1st alt.	Max Aaron	Samantha Cesario	Tarah Kayne / Daniel O'Shea	Kaitlin Hawayek / Jean-Luc Baker
2nd alt.	Jeremy Abbott	Courtney Hicks	Madeline Aaron / Max Settlage	Anastasia Cannuscio / Colin McManus
3rd alt.	Ross Miner	Mirai Nagasu	Jessica Calalang / Zack Sidhu	Alexandra Aldridge / Daniel Eaton
