= Chea Song-joo =

South Korean figure skater (born 1998)

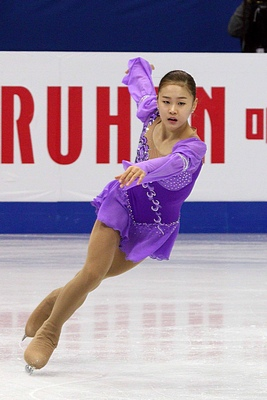

Personal information
- Born: August 19, 1998 (age 27) Goyang, South Korea
- Height: 1.70 m (5 ft 7 in)

Figure skating career
- Country: South Korea
- Coach: Lee Eun-hee
- Skating club: Goyang Seongsa Ice Rink

Chea Song-joo (Korean: 채송주; born August 19, 1998) is a South Korean figure skater. She finished 13th at the 2015 Four Continents Championships.

== Career ==
=== 2014–15 season ===
Chea competed at the 2014 Lombardia Trophy, obtaining the minimum TES for Four Continents. Back in Korea, she ranked 4th at the qualification event, the KSU President Cup Ranking Competition, which gives her the spot to compete at the 2015 Four Continents Championships to be held in Seoul, South Korea.

2015 Four Continents is first ISU competition for her. She got her personal best scores in short, free-skate and the combined total at 2015 Four Continents.

=== 2015–16 season ===
Chea competed at the JGP qualification competition held in South Korea and placed 5th place with total score 144.71, so she was given a spot for the JGP series.

Chea placed 13th at her JGP in Toruń, Poland. At the 2015 Volvo Open Cup, she placed 11th in the short program, 8th in the free skate, and 8th overall.

== Programs ==
Season	Short program	Free skating
2015–16	Oblivion by Astor Piazzolla	Nessun dorma (from Turandot) by Giacomo Puccini
2014–15	Tango Jalousie by Jacob Gade	Romeo and Juliet by Nino Rota; Ancient Airs and Dances, Suite No. 3: 3. Siciliana by Ottorino Respighi
2013–14	Introduction and Rondo Capriccioso by Camille Saint-Saëns	Piano Concerto No.1 In A Minor Op 15 by Edward MacDowell; I. Maestoso - Allegro con fuoco; III. Presto
2012–13	Cats by Andrew Lloyd Webber; Miss Saigon by Claude-Michel Schönberg	Piano Fantasy by William Joseph
2011–12	Miss Saigon by Claude-Michel Schönberg	Violin Concerto in E minor, Op.64; 1. Allegro molto appassionato by Felix Mendelssohn
2010–11	Two Guitars (gypsy music)	Malaguena by Raúl Di Blasio
2009–10	Wonderland by Maksim Mrvica	A Chorus Line by Marvin Hamlisch

== Competitive highlights ==
CS: Challenger Series; JGP: Junior Grand Prix

International
Event	10–11	11–12	12–13	13–14	14–15	15–16
Four Continents					13th	
CS Lombardia					12th	
Volvo Open Cup						8th
International: Junior
JGP Poland						13th
Asian Trophy			6th J			
National
South Korean	15th J		10th	10th	13th	WD
Levels: N = Novice; J = Junior; WD = Withdrew

== Detailed results ==
2015–16 season
Date	Event	Level	SP	FS	Total
November 4–8, 2015	2015 Volvo Open Cup	Senior	11; 41.75	8; 78.17	8; 119.92
September 23–27, 2015	2015 ISU Junior Grand Prix, Poland	Junior	12; **43.46**	13; 77.98	13; 121.44
2014–15 season
Date	Event	Level	SP	FS	Total
February 9–15, 2015	2015 ISU Four Continents Championships	Senior	15; 42.16	11; **96.93**	13; **139.09**
January 7–9, 2015	2015 South Korean Championships	Senior	17; 47.37	12; 86.04	13; 133.41
September 18–21, 2014	2014 Lombardia Trophy	Senior	14; 40.55	12; 79.67	12; 120.22
2013–14 season
Date	Event	Level	SP	FS	Total
January 3–5, 2014	2014 South Korean Championships	Senior	4; 52.40	12; 90.59	10; 142.99
2012–13 season
Date	Event	Level	SP	FS	Total
January 2–6, 2013	2013 South Korean Championships	Senior	12; 42.94	8; 86.32	10; 129.24
August 7–12, 2012	2012 Asian Figure Skating Trophy	Junior	5; 32.28	6; 59.83	6; 92.11

- Personal best highlighted in **bold**.
