= Ronald Lam =

Hong Kong figure skater

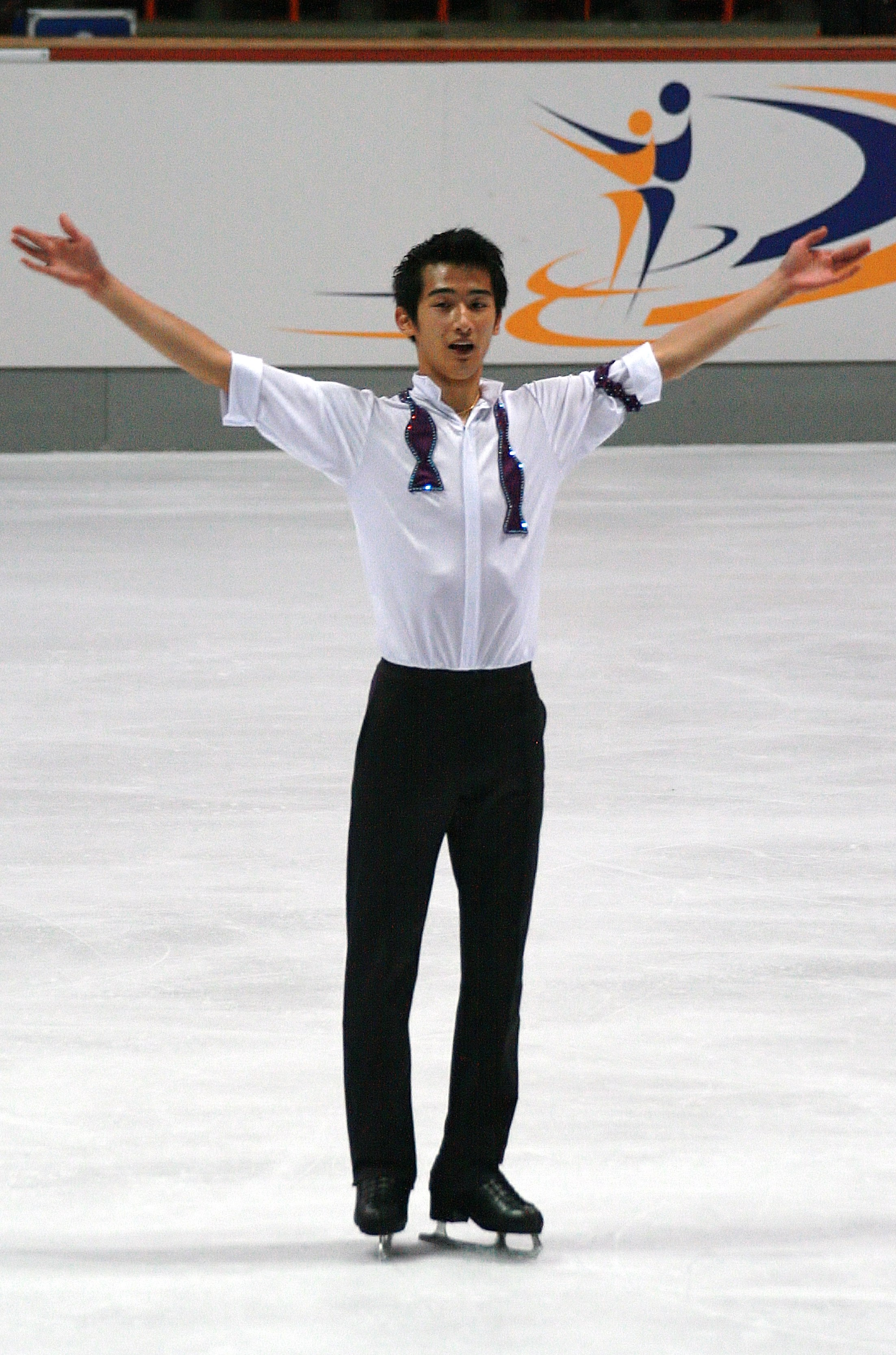
- Lam at the 2013 Nebelhorn Trophy

Personal information
- Full name: Ronald Lam Chiu Ting
- Born: February 13, 1991 (age 35) Hong Kong
- Height: 1.78 m (5 ft 10 in)

Figure skating career
- Country: Hong Kong
- Coach: Bruno Delmaestro, Kelly Champagne
- Skating club: Coquitlam SC
- Began skating: 1999
- Retired: July 24, 2015

Ronald Lam Chiu Ting (born February 13, 1991) is a retired Hong Kong figure skater. He won three senior international medals and three national titles. He competed in the final segment at three ISU Championships, placing 20th at the 2010 World Junior Championships in The Hague, Netherlands; 13th at the 2015 Four Continents Championships in Seoul, South Korea; and 14th at the 2015 World Championships in Shanghai, China. Lam represented Canada before switching to Hong Kong in 2012.

In May 2015, Lam graduated from the University of British Columbia with a Bachelor of Science degree in computer science. He received one Grand Prix assignment, to the 2015 Skate Canada International, but decided not to compete another season. He announced his retirement on July 24, 2015, looking to start a career beyond competitive figure skating.

== Programs ==
Season	Short program	Free skating
2014–2015	Rhapsody in Blue by George Gershwin	Phantom of the Opera by Andrew Lloyd Webber
2012–2014	Rhapsody in Blue by George Gershwin	Charlie Chaplin
2009–2010	Taiko Drummers by Joji Hirota	Lux Aeterna (from Requiem for a Dream) by Clint Mansell
2008–2009	Taiko Drummers by Joji Hirota	Jupiter, the Bringer of Jollity (from The Planets) by Gustav Holst
2007–2008	The War of the Worlds by Jeff Wayne	Jupiter, the Bringer of Jollity (from The Planets) by Gustav Holst

== Competitive highlights ==
CS: Challenger Series; JGP: Junior Grand Prix

=== For Hong Kong ===
International
Event	2011–12	2012–13	2013–14	2014–15	2015–16
World Champ.		30th	28th	14th	
Four Continents Champ.			26th	13th	
GP Skate Canada					WD
CS Autumn Classic				5th	
CS U.S. Classic				5th	
Universiade			6th	6th	
Asian Trophy		1st		5th	
Merano Cup		5th			
Nebelhorn Trophy			26th		
New Year's Cup		2nd			
U.S. Classic		5th			
Volvo Open Cup		3rd			
National
Hong Kong Champ.	1st		1st	1st	

=== For Canada ===
International: Junior
Event	2007–08	2008–09	2009–10	2010–11
World Junior Champ.			20th	
JGP Belarus		11th		
JGP Croatia			9th	
JGP Estonia	15th			
JGP Italy		6th		
JGP Poland			5th	
National
Canadian Champ.	11th J.	4th J.	9th	7th
J. = Junior level
