= Joshua Farris =

American figure skater (born 1995)

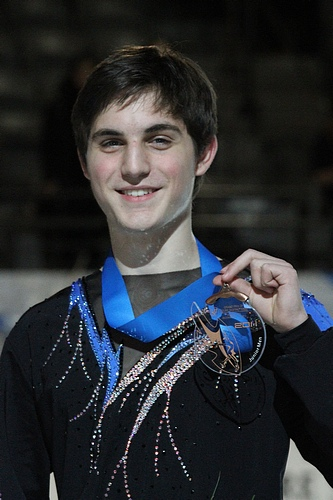
- Farris in 2011

Personal information
- Born: January 6, 1995 (age 31) Renton, Washington, U.S.
- Home town: Colorado Springs, Colorado, U.S.
- Height: 5 ft 9 in (1.75 m)

Figure skating career
- Country: United States
- Discipline: Men's singles
- Began skating: 2001
- Retired: 2018

Medal record
Four Continents Championships
Silver medal – second place	2015 Seoul	Singles
U.S. Championships
Bronze medal – third place	2015 Greensboro	Singles
World Junior Championships
Gold medal – first place	2013 Milan	Singles
Silver medal – second place	2012 Minsk	Singles
Junior Grand Prix Final
Silver medal – second place	2012–13 Sochi	Singles
Bronze medal – third place	2011–12 Quebec City	Singles

Joshua Farris (born January 6, 1995) is a retired American competitive figure skater. He is the 2015 Four Continents silver medalist, the 2013 World Junior Championship gold medalist, a two-time Junior Grand Prix Final medalist (silver in 2012, bronze in 2011), and the 2010 U.S. Championship junior silver medalist.

== Personal life ==
Joshua Farris was born in and a native of Renton, Washington. At the age of eight, he was diagnosed with dyslexia, which may be connected with a concussion he sustained as a child.

Farris moved to Colorado Springs in mid-2007 and resides there to this day. He enjoys playing guitar, reading, hiking, camping, and skiing. He currently lives with his girlfriend, Sophie, and their puppy, Joey.

== Career ==
=== Early years ===
Farris began skating at age five after his mother took him skating for his birthday. He moved to Colorado Springs, Colorado, in mid-2007 to train with Tom Zakrajsek and Becky Calvin.

Farris won his third national title when he won the novice gold medal at the 2009 U.S. Championships. He then competed at the 2009 International Challenge Cup in the Netherlands, where he won the silver medal at the junior level.

He made his ISU Junior Grand Prix (JGP) debut the following season. He was assigned to the JGP events in the United States and Turkey, where he placed fourth and fifth, respectively. At the 2010 U.S. Championships, he won the silver medal at the junior level.

=== 2010–11 season ===
During the 2010–11 season, Farris was assigned to the JGP events in Romania and Great Britain, where he won the silver medal and the gold medal, respectively. This qualified him for the 2010-11 Junior Grand Prix Final, where he finished in sixth place.

Farris then decided to move up to the senior level nationally. At the 2011 U.S. Championships, Farris fell hard on his left hip while training during the second day of practice. The fall resulted in a torn abductor muscle, but he decided to compete despite the pain. He placed thirteenth after a shaky short program. On the day between the short program and the free skate, Farris went to a restaurant and suffered anaphylactic shock due to an allergic reaction. He was taken to the emergency room, where he stayed until 3 a.m. He decided to compete in the free skate, where he had several shaky landings and three falls. He finished in twenty-first place. He later learned that he had broken his fibula and sprained a tendon when he fell on his second triple Axel attempt. Following this competition, Farris decided to switch coaches to Christy Krall, with whom he had already worked, and Damon Allen.

=== 2011–12 season ===
During the 2011–12 season, Farris was assigned to the 2011 JGP Poland, which he won. He then won the gold medal at his second event, the 2011 JGP Estonia, and qualified for the Junior Grand Prix Final, where he won the bronze medal. He finished sixteenth at the 2012 U.S. Championships. At the 2012 World Junior Championships, Farris won the short program and the silver medal. He also won the Youth Excellence in Sports award from The Denver Post in March 2012.

=== 2012–13 season ===
During the 2012–13 season, Farris was assigned to JGP events in the United States and Slovenia. He won gold medals at both events and qualified for the 2012–13 Grand Prix Final in Sochi, Russia. There, he finished first in the short program and second in the free skate, winning the silver medal.

At the 2013 U.S. Championships, Farris placed third in the short program. He fell on his planned quadruple toe loop in the free skate, but managed to secure fourth place. He then won the gold medal at the 2013 World Junior Championships with an overall score of 228.32 points. Farris' score was a new record set for men competing at the junior level.

=== 2013–14 season ===
During the 2013–14 season, Farris made his senior Grand Prix debut at the 2013 Skate Canada, where he finished in fifth place. He then withdrew from his next assignment, the 2013 Cup of Russia.

At the 2014 U.S. Championships, Farris again finished in fourth place.

=== 2014–15 season ===
During the 2014–15 season, Farris was assigned to the 2014 Cup of China and the 2014 NHK Trophy. However, he had to withdraw from the Cup of China due to a recurring right ankle injury, which had been a problem since 2011. At the NHK Trophy, he finished in eleventh place.

At the 2015 U.S. Championships, Farris won the bronze medal. In his free skate, he executed a double toe loop three times, losing credit for one of his jump combinations. Still, his placement was an improvement from the previous year. At the 2015 Four Continents Championships, he set new personal best scores in both the short program and the free skate, and won the silver medal. This was his first medal in a prominent senior-level international competition. At the 2015 World Championships, he finished in eleventh place.

=== 2015–16 season ===
Farris' Grand Prix assignments were the 2015 Skate Canada International and the 2015 NHK Trophy. However, he had to withdraw from both events after sustaining three concussions in three weeks. The first occurred when he fell while practicing a quadruple toe loop jump. Since a scan indicated nothing, he resumed training, but then sustained a second concussion, followed soon after by a third when he hit his head while entering a car. He did not compete during the season.

=== Hiatus ===
Farris announced his retirement from competitive skating on July 1, 2016, after struggling with the aftereffects of the concussions and depression. He resumed skating in early November 2016, after his health had improved, and announced in February 2017 that he hoped to return to competition in the 2017–18 season. He trained at the Broadmoor World Arena in Colorado Springs, coached by Christy Krall and Damon Allen. However, the side effects from his brain injury did not go away, and he had to stop training again.

=== Choreographing career ===
Following his competitive career, Farris began working as a figure skating choreographer at the Broadmoor Skating Club.

Farris' past clients have included:

- Camden Pulkinen
- Jimmy Ma
- Vincent Zhou
- Lee Si-hyeong

=== Coaching career ===
Following his competitive career, Farris began working as a figure skating coach at the Colorado Springs World Arena Ice Hall. He became a resident coach with the Broadmoor Skating Club in 2022.

== Programs ==
Season	Short program	Free skate	Exhibition	Ref.
2005–06	The Phantom of the Opera By Andrew Lloyd Webber	"Summer" From The Four Seasons By Antonio Vivaldi	—N/a	
2006–07	The Phantom of the Opera By Andrew Lloyd Webber	"Eleanor Rigby" By The Beatles Performed by the Boston Pops	—N/a	
2007–08	"O Fortuna" From Carmina Burana By Carl Orff	Henry V By Patrick Doyle	—N/a	
2008–09	Leyenda By Isaac Albéniz	"Mars, the Bringer of War" From The Planets By Gustav Holst	—N/a	
2009–10	"Stardust" By Artie Shaw; "Sing, Sing, Sing" By Louis Prima Arranged by Chris Boardman Choreo. by Tom Dickson	Warsaw Concerto By Richard Addinsell Performed by Patrik Jablonski and the Polish Radio Orchestra Choreo. by Tom Dickson	—N/a	
2010–11	"El Dron" By Pepe Habichuela Choreo. by Tom Dickson	Porgy and Bess By George Gershwin Choreo. by Tom Dickson	—N/a	
2011–12	Clair de Lune By Claude Debussy Choreo. by Damon Allen	Piano Concerto No. 2 in C Minor Op. 18 III: Allegro Scherzando By Sergei Rachmaninoff Performed by Van Cliburn & Fritz Reiner Choreo. by Damon Allen & Joshua Farris	"Gravity" By John Mayer	
2012–13	Suite for Solo Cello No. 1 in G Major: Prelude By Johann Sebastian Bach Performed by Yo-Yo Ma Choreo. by Damon Allen & Joshua Farris	Piano Concerto No. 2 in C Minor Op. 18 III: Allegro Scherzando By Sergei Rachmaninoff Performed by Van Cliburn & Fritz Reiner Choreo. by Damon Allen & Joshua Farris	"Ain't No Sunshine" Performed by Josh Hoge	
2013–14	Libertango By Astor Piazzolla Performed by Anderson and Roe Piano Duo Choreo. by Damon Allen & Joshua Farris	Schindler's List By John Williams Choreo. by Damon Allen & Joshua Farris	"To Build a Home" By The Cinematic Orchestra; "When I Was Your Man" By Bruno Mars	
2014–15	"Give Me Love" By Ed Sheeran Choreo. by Jeffrey Buttle	Schindler's List By John Williams Choreo. by Damon Allen & Joshua Farris	"When I Was Your Man"; "Give Me Love"	

== Competitive highlights ==
- GP – Event of the ISU Grand Prix Series
- JGP – Event of the ISU Junior Grand Prix Series

Competition placements at senior level
Season	2010–11	2011–12	2012–13	2013–14	2014-15
World Championships					11th
Four Continents Championships				6th	2nd
U.S. Championships	21st	16th	4th	4th	3rd
GP NHK Trophy					11th
GP Skate Canada				5th	
U.S. Classic				3rd	

Competition placements at junior level
Season	2008–09	2009–10	2010–11	2011–12	2012–13
World Junior Championships				2nd	1st
Junior Grand Prix Final			6th	3rd	2nd
U.S. Championships		2nd			
JGP Estonia				1st	
JGP Great Britain			1st		
JGP Poland				1st	
JGP Romania			2nd		
JGP Slovenia					1st
JGP Turkey		5th			
JGP United States		4th			1st
Challenge Cup	2nd				

== Detailed results ==
ISU personal best scores in the +3/-3 GOE System
Segment	Type	Score	Event
Total	TSS	260.01	2015 Four Continents Championships
Short program	TSS	84.29	2015 Four Continents Championships
Short program	TES	44.53	2015 Four Continents Championships
Short program	PCS	39.76	2015 Four Continents Championships
Free skating	TSS	175.72	2015 Four Continents Championships
Free skating	TES	91.02	2015 Four Continents Championships
Free skating	PCS	84.70	2015 Four Continents Championships

- Small medals for the short program and free skating are only awarded at ISU Championships.
- At national events in the United States, pewter medals are awarded for fourth place.

=== Senior level ===
Results in the 2010–11 season
Date	Event	SP		FS		Total	
Date	Event	P	Score	P	Score	P	Score
Jan 22–30, 2011	(United States) 2011 U.S. Championships	13	60.91	22	90.82	21	151.73

Results in the 2011–12 season
Date	Event	SP		FS		Total	
Date	Event	P	Score	P	Score	P	Score
Jan 22–29, 2012	(United States) 2012 U.S. Championships	14	65.43	16	132.55	16	197.98

Results in the 2012–13 season
Date	Event	SP		FS		Total	
Date	Event	P	Score	P	Score	P	Score
Jan 19–27, 2013	(United States) 2013 U.S. Championships	3	79.78	4	165.04	4	244.82

Results in the 2013–14 season
Date	Event	SP		FS		Total	
Date	Event	P	Score	P	Score	P	Score
Sep 11–15, 2013	(United States) 2013 U.S. International Classic	3	71.85	3	134.71	3	206.56
Oct 24–27, 2013	2013 Skate Canada International	8	69.14	4	147.58	5	216.72
Jan 5–12, 2013	(United States) 2014 U.S. Championships	5	78.37	4	169.69	4	248.06
Jan 20–26, 2014	(Taiwan) 2014 Four Continents Championships	7	74.85	5	146.15	6	221.00

Results in the 2014–15 season
Date	Event	SP		FS		Total	
Date	Event	P	Score	P	Score	P	Score
Nov 28–30, 2014	(Japan) 2014 NHK Trophy	11	58.35	11	111.53	11	169.88
Jan 18–25, 2015	(United States) 2015 U.S. Championships	2	90.40	3	177.58	3	267.98
Feb 9–15, 2015	(South Korea) 2015 Four Continents Championships	5	84.29	2	175.72	2	260.01
Mar 23–29, 2015	(China) 2015 World Championships	13	73.52	10	149.52	11	223.04

=== Junior level ===
Results in the 2008–09 season
Date	Event	SP		FS		Total	
Date	Event	P	Score	P	Score	P	Score
Feb 4–8, 2009	(Netherlands) 2009 International Challenge Cup	6	46.75	1	114.58	2	161.33

Results in the 2009–10 season
Date	Event	SP		FS		Total	
Date	Event	P	Score	P	Score	P	Score
Sep 2–6, 2009	2009 JGP United States	10	50.30	3	104.22	4	154.52
Oct 14–18, 2009	2009 JGP Turkey	2	62.50	7	99.33	5	161.83
Jan 14–26, 2010	(United States) 2010 U.S. Championships (Junior)	4	58.24	1	136.79	2	195.03

Results in the 2010–11 season
Date	Event	SP		FS		Total	
Date	Event	P	Score	P	Score	P	Score
Sep 8–11, 2010	2010 JGP Romania	1	67.03	3	112.19	2	179.22
Sep 29 – Oct 3, 2010	(United Kingdom) 2010 JGP Great Britain	1	59.79	1	127.95	1	207.67
Dec 8–21, 2010	(China) 2010–11 Junior Grand Prix Final	4	65.24	7	108.73	6	173.97

Results in the 2011–12 season
Date	Event	SP		FS		Total	
Date	Event	P	Score	P	Score	P	Score
Sep 14–17, 2011	2011 JGP Poland	1	75.69	2	126.76	1	202.45
Oct 12–15, 2011	2011 JGP Estonia	1	74.55	1	133.12	1	207.67
Dec 8–11, 2011	(Canada) 2011–12 Junior Grand Prix Final	1	72.99	3	130.99	3	203.98
Feb 27 – Mar 4, 2012	(Belarus) 2012 World Junior Championships	1	75.43	2	146.54	2	221.97

Results in the 2012–13 season
Date	Event	SP		FS		Total	
Date	Event	P	Score	P	Score	P	Score
Aug 30 – Sep 1, 2012	2012 JGP United States	1	72.20	1	146.49	1	218.69
Sep 27–29, 2012	2012 JGP Slovenia	1	74.35	1	136.86	1	211.21
Dec 6–9, 2012	(Russia) 2012–13 Junior Grand Prix Final	1	74.53	2	136.84	2	211.37
Feb 25 – Mar 3, 2013	(Italy) 2013 World Junior Championships	1	75.84	2	152.48	1	228.32
