= 2014 U.S. Figure Skating Championships =

Figure skating competition

- Type: National Championship
- Date: January 5 – 12
- Season: 2013–14
- Location: Boston, Massachusetts
- Host: Skating Club of Boston
- Venue: TD Garden

Champions
- Men's singles: Jeremy Abbott (S); Nathan Chen (J)
- Women's singles: Gracie Gold (S); Amber Glenn (J)
- Pairs: Marissa Castelli / Simon Shnapir (S); Madeline Aaron / Max Settlage (J)
- Ice dance: Meryl Davis / Charlie White (S); Kaitlin Hawayek / Jean-Luc Baker (J)
- Previous: 2013 U.S. Championships
- Next: 2015 U.S. Championships

The 2014 U.S. Figure Skating Championships were the national figure skating championships of the United States for the 2013–14 season.

The event was held in Boston, Massachusetts on January 5–12, 2014. Medals were awarded in the disciplines of men's singles, ladies' singles, pair skating, and ice dancing at the senior, junior, novice, intermediate and juvenile levels. The results were part of the U.S. selection criteria for the 2014 Winter Olympics, 2014 World Championships, 2014 World Junior Championships, and 2014 Four Continents Championships.

== Overview ==
The 2014 event was the 100th anniversary of the U.S. Championships and the seventh time that Boston had hosted the competition. Competitors qualified at the Eastern, Midwestern, or Pacific Coast Sectional Championships or earned a bye.

== Senior results ==
=== Senior men ===
Rank	Name	Total points	SP		FS	
1	Jeremy Abbott	274.27	1	99.86	2	174.41
2	Jason Brown	270.08	3	87.47	1	182.61
3	Max Aaron	260.44	4	86.95	3	173.49
4	Joshua Farris	248.06	5	78.37	4	169.69
5	Richard Dornbush	236.38	2	92.04	8	144.34
6	Douglas Razzano	232.43	7	75.18	5	157.25
7	Ross Miner	224.81	8	71.94	6	152.87
8	Adam Rippon	222.19	6	77.58	7	144.61
9	Brandon Mroz	208.69	9	70.57	10	138.12
10	Stephen Carriere	203.25	12	64.42	9	138.83
11	Grant Hochstein	198.50	10	64.62	12	133.88
12	Keegan Messing	197.45	14	61.15	11	136.30
13	Timothy Dolensky	184.84	13	61.76	13	123.08
14	Sean Rabbitt	183.34	15	60.58	14	122.76
15	Lukas Kaugars	179.32	11	64.57	15	114.75
16	Philip Warren	169.04	16	55.80	16	113.24
17	Daniel Raad	161.01	18	52.98	17	108.03
18	Scott Dyer	156.75	17	55.78	18	100.97
19	Robert Przepioski	147.34	19	47.00	19	100.34

=== Senior ladies ===
Rank	Name	Total points	SP		FS	
1	Gracie Gold	211.69	1	72.12	1	139.57
2	Polina Edmunds	193.63	2	66.75	2	126.88
3	Mirai Nagasu	190.74	3	65.44	3	125.30
4	Ashley Wagner	182.74	4	64.71	5	118.03
5	Samantha Cesario	173.97	11	54.88	4	119.09
6	Courtney Hicks	168.68	16	51.69	6	116.99
7	Barbie Long	163.79	10	55.55	7	108.24
8	Christina Gao	163.03	6	60.91	10	102.12
9	Hannah Miller	161.41	7	57.49	8	103.92
10	Leah Keiser	160.33	8	57.41	9	102.92
11	Agnes Zawadzki	153.16	13	54.18	11	98.98
12	Ashley Cain	151.64	5	61.45	16	90.19
13	Mariah Bell	149.44	9	56.72	15	92.72
14	Kiri Baga	149.17	14	54.02	13	95.15
15	Angela Wang	148.93	12	54.40	14	94.53
16	Yasmin Siraj	139.73	21	44.67	13	95.06
17	Franchesca Chiera	135.72	15	52.81	20	82.91
18	Rachael Flatt	135.14	20	46.57	17	88.57
19	Caroline Zhang	133.06	19	47.87	18	85.19
20	Vanessa Lam	132.21	18	48.98	19	83.23
21	Joelle Forte	123.60	17	50.53	21	73.07

=== Senior pairs ===
Rank	Name	Total points	SP		FS	
1	Marissa Castelli / Simon Shnapir	205.71	1	73.13	3	132.58
2	Felicia Zhang / Nathan Bartholomay	201.72	2	66.50	2	135.22
3	Caydee Denney / John Coughlin	201.43	4	65.40	1	136.03
4	Alexa Scimeca / Christopher Knierim	189.67	5	64.68	4	124.99
5	Haven Denney / Brandon Frazier	181.59	8	59.52	5	122.07
6	Tarah Kayne / Danny O'Shea	173.89	7	61.48	6	112.41
7	DeeDee Leng / Timothy Leduc	171.94	3	66.40	9	105.54
8	Gretchen Donlan / Andrew Speroff	170.73	6	61.70	8	109.03
9	Lindsay Davis / Rockne Brubaker	163.81	10	54.14	7	109.67
10	Jessica Pfund / AJ Reiss	156.04	9	55.16	10	100.88
11	Jessica Calalang / Zack Sidhu	151.65	11	51.19	11	100.46
12	Alexandria Shaughnessy / James Morgan	140.73	12	48.45	12	92.28

=== Senior ice dancing ===
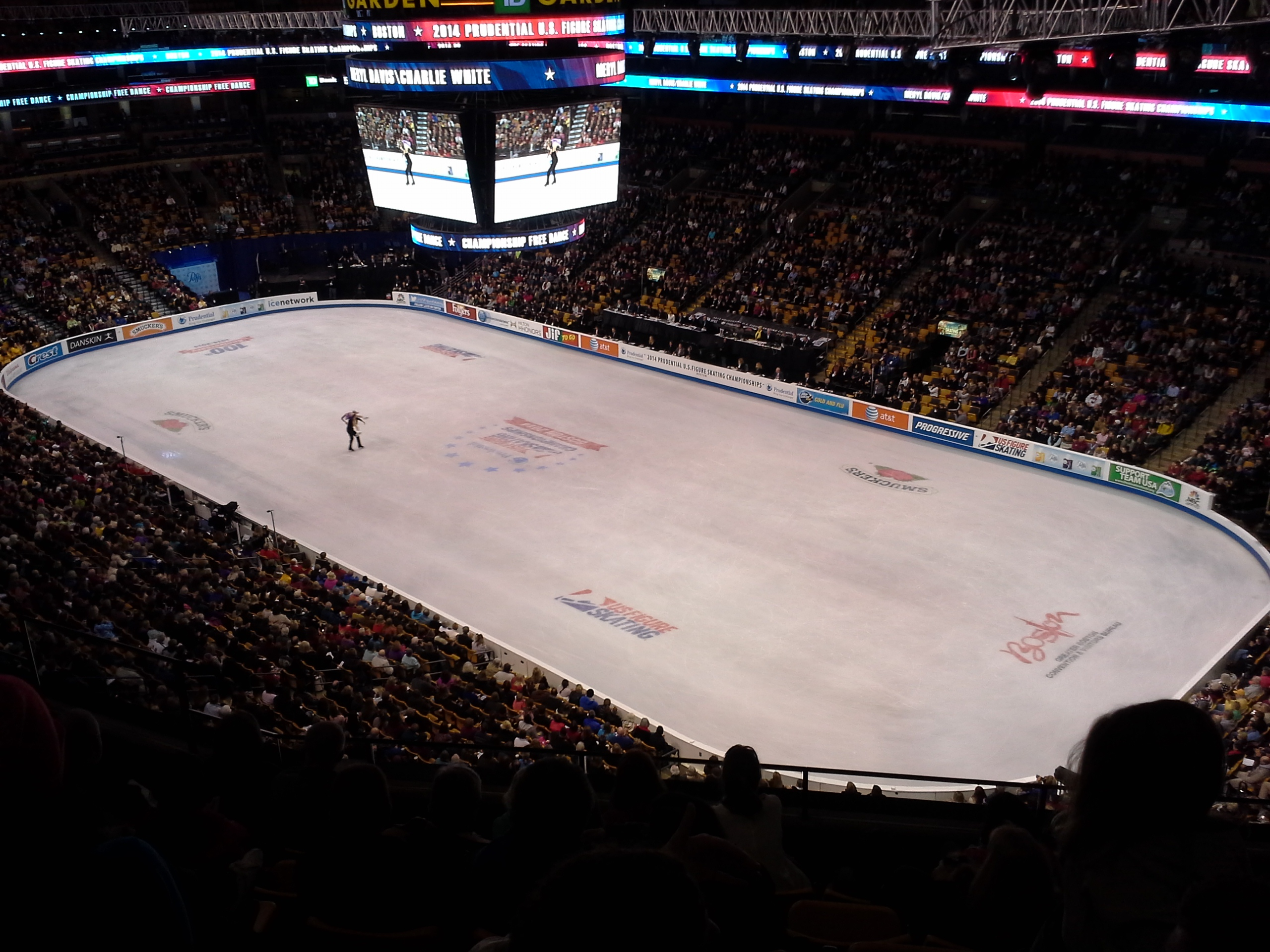
Meryl Davis and Charlie White perform their free dance at the 2014 U.S. Championships

Rank	Name	Total points	SD		FD	
1	Meryl Davis / Charlie White	200.19	1	80.69	1	119.50
2	Madison Chock / Evan Bates	181.44	2	73.41	2	108.03
3	Maia Shibutani / Alex Shibutani	170.44	3	68.00	3	102.44
4	Madison Hubbell / Zachary Donohue	168.27	4	66.69	4	101.58
5	Alexandra Aldridge / Daniel Eaton	160.26	5	63.71	5	96.55
6	Lynn Kriengkrairut / Logan Giulietti-Schmitt	155.98	6	61.22	6	94.76
7	Anastasia Cannuscio / Colin McManus	140.96	7	54.63	7	86.33
8	Anastasia Olson / Ian Lorello	128.77	10	47.86	8	80.91
9	Alissandra Aronow / Collin Brubaker	127.14	8	53.19	9	73.95
10	Ginna Hoptman / Pavel Filchenkov	122.83	9	52.68	12	70.15
11	Isabella Cannuscio / Michael Bramante	118.92	11	46.21	11	72.71
12	Danielle Gamelin / Alexander Gamelin	112.97	13	39.87	10	73.10
13	Madeline Heritage / Nathaniel Fast	104.05	12	41.63	14	62.42
14	Elicia Reynolds / Stephen Reynolds	101.00	15	36.52	13	64.48
15	Kristen Nardozzi / Nick Traxler	98.40	14	38.14	15	60.26
16	Kseniya Ponomaryova / Oleg Altukhov	73.77	16	27.05	16	46.72
17	Gabriela Morrell Zucker / Andrejs Sitiks	72.30	17	25.58	17	46.72
18	Pauline Bynum / Jason Deveikis	64.82	18	23.68	18	41.14

== Junior results ==
=== Junior men ===
Rank	Name	Total points	SP		FS	
1	Nathan Chen	223.92	1	79.61	1	144.32
2	Jordan Moeller	191.66	6	57.41	2	134.25
3	Jimmy Ma	182.73	2	63.46	3	119.27
4	Chase Belmontes	177.19	4	61.07	5	116.12
5	Nicholas Vrdoljak	174.99	3	63.44	7	111.55
6	Kevin Shum	172.63	7	56.08	4	116.55
7	Tony Lu	170.83	5	58.19	6	112.64
8	Spencer Howe	157.41	8	53.91	8	103.50
9	James Schetelich	154.37	9	51.19	9	103.18
10	Nix Phengsy	150.74	10	49.27	10	101.47
11	Ben Jalovick	135.80	11	45.54	11	90.36
12	Evan Bender	133.11	12	45.35	13	87.76
13	Daniel Kulenkamp	124.78	13	36.91	12	87.87

=== Junior ladies ===
Rank	Name	Total points	SP		FS	
1	Amber Glenn	186.51	1	63.99	1	122.52
2	Tyler Pierce	175.07	2	62.38	2	112.69
3	Ashley Shin	155.18	3	57.91	3	97.27
4	Bradie Tennell	141.99	4	55.34	6	86.65
5	Elena Taylor	141.62	6	50.30	5	91.32
6	Amy Lin	137.87	12	42.80	4	95.07
7	Maria Yang	135.74	7	49.61	8	86.13
8	Olivia Serafini	132.34	10	46.17	7	86.17
9	Elizabeth Nguyen	130.92	8	47.22	9	83.70
10	Megan Wessenburg	129.72	9	46.75	10	82.97
11	Lyra Katzman	118.83	11	43.55	11	75.28
12	Xylina Rusit	100.76	13	34.68	12	66.08
WD	Karen Chen		5	51.78		

=== Junior pairs ===
Rank	Name	Total points	SP		FS	
1	Madeline Aaron / Max Settlage	160.67	1	58.77	1	101.90
2	Chelsea Liu / David Perini	144.82	2	53.93	2	90.89
3	AnnaMarie Pearce / Jason Pacini	139.92	3	52.28	5	87.04
4	Elise Middleton / Anthony Evans	136.64	4	49.20	4	87.44
5	Brianna de la Mora / Taylor Wilson	131.64	5	45.32	6	86.32
6	Olivia Oltmanns / Joshua Santillan	128.82	9	40.94	3	87.88
7	Aya Takai / Brian Johnson	124.02	8	42.20	7	81.82
8	Kaitlin Budd / Nikita Cheban	123.89	6	43.58	8	80.31
9	Cali Fujimoto / Nicholas Barsi-Rhyne	116.80	10	40.69	9	76.11
10	Alyssa McDougal / Paul Schatz	114.95	7	42.23	10	72.72

=== Junior ice dancing ===
Rank	Name	Total points	SD		FD	
1	Kaitlin Hawayek / Jean-Luc Baker	152.26	1	65.30	1	86.96
2	Lorraine McNamara / Quinn Carpenter	147.50	2	62.28	3	85.22
3	Rachel Parsons / Michael Parsons	145.78	3	59.32	2	86.46
4	Holly Moore / Daniel Klaber	136.66	4	56.71	4	79.95
5	Elliana Pogrebinsky / Ross Gudis	129.50	5	53.62	5	75.88
6	Chloe Lewis / Logan Bye	122.14	6	46.35	6	75.79
7	Julia Biechler / Damian Dodge	110.28	7	41.08	7	69.20
8	Rachel Brozina / Nicholas Taylor	102.38	11	37.67	8	64.71
9	Sammi Wren / Alexey Shchepetov	98.45	9	38.12	9	60.33
10	Emily Day / Kevin Leahy	95.97	8	38.39	10	57.58
11	Olivia Di Iorio / Alex Benoit	91.62	10	38.01	14	53.61
12	Tori Patsis / Joseph Johnson	91.13	13	37.44	11	53.69
13	Marcha Kiatrungrit / Bradley Lawrence	90.73	12	37.47	13	53.62
14	Kelsey Barnes / Douglas Stevenson	84.07	14	30.42	12	53.65

== International team selections ==
The international teams were announced at two press conferences on January 12, 2014.

=== Olympic team ===
The nominations to the Olympic team were announced as follows:

	Men	Ladies	Pairs	Ice dancing
1	Jeremy Abbott	Gracie Gold	Marissa Castelli / Simon Shnapir	Meryl Davis / Charlie White
2	Jason Brown	Polina Edmunds	Felicia Zhang /Nathan Bartholomay	Madison Chock / Evan Bates
3		Ashley Wagner		Maia Shibutani / Alex Shibutani
1st alt.	Max Aaron	Mirai Nagasu	Caydee Denney / John Coughlin	Madison Hubbell / Zach Donohue
2nd alt.	Joshua Farris	Samantha Cesario	Alexa Scimeca / Chris Knierim	Alexandra Aldridge / Daniel Eaton
3rd alt.	Richard Dornbush	Courtney Hicks	Haven Denney / Brandon Frazier	Lynn Kriengkrairut / Logan Giulietti-Schmitt

	Men	Ladies	Pairs	Ice dancing
Team Trophy	Jeremy Abbott / Jason Brown	Gracie Gold / Ashley Wagner	Marissa Castelli / Simon Shnapir	Meryl Davis / Charlie White

=== World team ===
The team to the 2014 World Championships was announced as follows in January 2014 and amended in March:

	Men	Ladies	Pairs	Ice dancing
1	Max Aaron	Polina Edmunds	Marissa Castelli / Simon Shnapir	Madison Chock / Evan Bates
2	Jeremy Abbott	Gracie Gold	~~Caydee Denney / John Coughlin~~	~~Meryl Davis / Charlie White~~
3		Ashley Wagner		Maia Shibutani / Alex Shibutani
1st alt.	Jason Brown	Mirai Nagasu	Felicia Zhang / Nathan Bartholomay (added)	~~Madison Hubbell / Zachary Donahue~~
2nd alt.	Joshua Farris	Samantha Cesario	Alexa Scimeca / Chris Knierim	Alexandra Aldridge / Daniel Eaton (added)
3rd alt.	Richard Dornbush	Courtney Hicks	Haven Denney / Brandon Frazier	Lynn Kriengkrairut / Logan Giulietti-Schmitt

=== Four Continents team ===
The team to the 2014 Four Continents Championships was announced as follows:

	Men	Ladies	Pairs	Ice dancing
1	Richard Dornbush	Samantha Cesario	Haven Denney / Brandon Frazier	Alexandra Aldridge / Daniel Eaton
2	Joshua Farris	Courtney Hicks	Tarah Kayne / Daniel O'Shea	Madison Hubbell / Zachary Donahue
3	Adam Rippon	Mirai Nagasu	Alexa Scimeca / Chris Knierim	Lynn Kriengkrairut / Logan Giulietti-Schmitt
1st alt.	Douglas Razzano	Barbie Long	Caydee Denney / John Coughlin	Anastasia Cannuscio / Colin McManus
2nd alt.	Ross Miner	Christina Gao	Gretchen Donlan / Andrew Speroff	
3rd alt.	Brandon Mroz	Agnes Zawadzki	DeeDee Leng / Timothy LeDuc	

=== World Junior team ===
The team to the 2014 World Junior Championships was announced as follows:

	Men	Ladies	Pairs	Ice dancing
1	Nathan Chen	Karen Chen	Madeline Aaron / Max Settlage	Kaitlin Hawayek / Jean-Luc Baker
2	Jordan Moeller	Amber Glenn	Kaitlin Budd / Nikita Cheban	Lorraine McNamara / Quinn Carpenter
3	Shotaro Omori	Tyler Pierce	~~Chelsea Liu / David Perini~~	Rachel Parsons / Michael Parsons
1st alt.	Jimmy Ma	Hannah Miller	Aya Takai / Brian Johnson (added)	Holly Moore / Daniel Klaber
2nd alt.	Jason Belmontes	Leah Keiser		Elliana Pogrebinsky / Ross Gudis
3rd alt.	Nicholas Vrdoljak	Ashley Cain		Chloe Lewis / Logan Bye
