= Polina Edmunds =

American figure skater (born 1998)

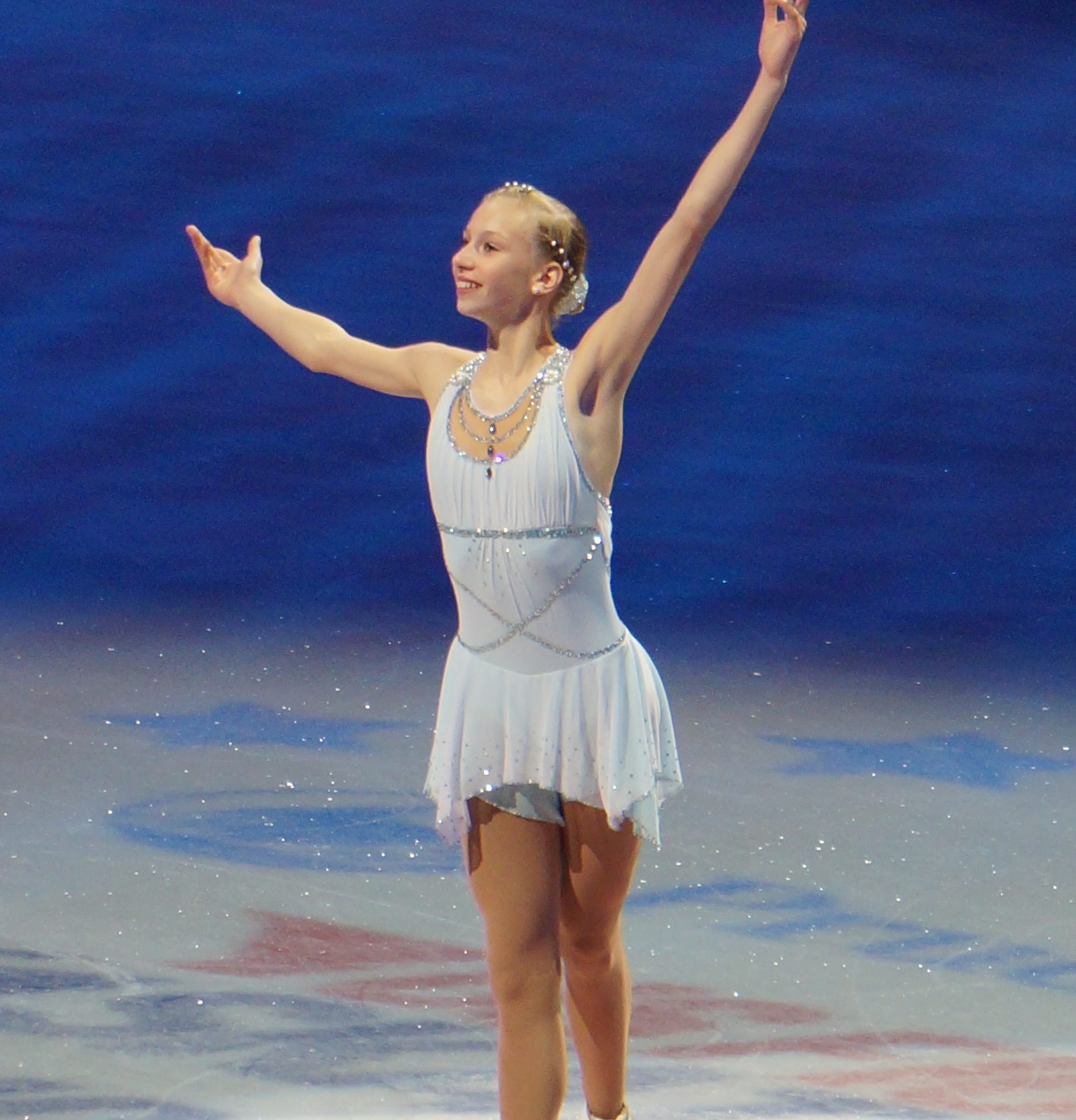
- Edmunds at the 2014 U.S. Championships

Personal information
- Full name: Polina Edmunds Bast
- Born: May 18, 1998 (age 28) Santa Clara, California, U.S.
- Home town: San Jose, California, U.S.
- Height: 5 ft 7 in (1.70 m)

Figure skating career
- Country: United States
- Coach: David Glynn; Nina Edmunds
- Skating club: Peninsula SC
- Began skating: 2000
- Retired: July 15, 2020
Medal record
Figure skating: Ladies' singles
Representing United States
Four Continents Championships
Gold medal – first place	2015 Seoul	Ladies' singles
U.S. Championships
Silver medal – second place	2014 Boston	Ladies' singles
Silver medal – second place	2016 St.Paul	Ladies' singles

Polina Edmunds Bast (born May 18, 1998) is a retired American figure skater. She is the 2015 Four Continents champion, the 2014 CS U.S. Classic champion, and a two-time U.S. national silver medalist (2014, 2016). She represented the United States at the 2014 Winter Olympics in Sochi, finishing 9th.

Earlier in her career, Edmunds won two ISU Junior Grand Prix events and the 2013 U.S. National Junior title. Edmunds was in skates by two, in lessons by four.

== Personal life ==
Polina Edmunds was born on May 18, 1998, in Santa Clara, California. Her mother, Nina, is a figure skating coach and former figure skater originally from Tver, Russia, who learned how to coach under Alexei Mishin. Her father, John Edmunds, is CFO of a computer software company. She has two brothers—James, who is two years older, and Daniel, four years younger—both of whom play hockey. Olympic ice dance champions, Marina Klimova and Sergei Ponomarenko, are the godparents of her brother, Daniel. In 2007, Edmunds began taking ballet and jazz lessons at Dance Theatre International in Evergreen, San Jose when she was eight. She was a student at Archbishop Mitty High School and graduated in May 2016. She began studying communication at Santa Clara University in September 2016. She was a member of Santa Clara's chapter of Delta Gamma.

Edmunds married Ian Bast on September 14, 2024.

== Career ==
Edmunds first stepped onto the ice at twenty months old and was taking lessons in both skating and ballet by age four. She cites Carolina Kostner, Sasha Cohen, and Michelle Kwan as her figure skating role models. She trained at the Sharks Ice Rink in San Jose with longtime coaches David Glynn and Nina Edmunds, her mother, who have both coached her since she was four.

=== Early career ===
Edmunds placed seventh on the junior level at the 2011 U.S. Championships and then sixth in 2012. In the 2012–2013 season, she won the U.S. national junior title at the 2013 U.S. Championships. Having received no ISU Junior Grand Prix assignments, Edmunds' only remaining opportunity to get on the ISU's Season's Best or World Standing lists—and thus, have a chance of a senior Grand Prix assignment in the following season—was the 2013 World Junior Championships. U.S. Figure Skating decided not to give her one of the three ladies' spots to World Juniors and instead sent her to the 2013 Gardena Spring Trophy, where she won the junior gold medal. It did not count for either list.

=== 2013–2014 season: Sochi Olympics ===
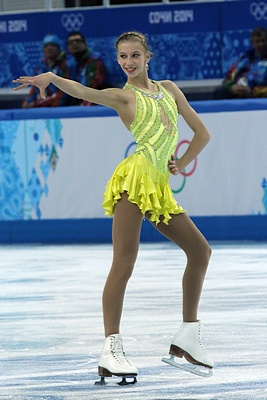
Edmunds performing her short program at the 2014 Olympics.

In mid-2013, Edmunds began receiving coaching from Frank Carroll in addition to David Glynn and Nina Edmunds. She received her first ISU Junior Grand Prix (JGP) assignments in the 2013–14 season; she placed first in both segments on her way to the gold medal in Mexico City, her debut. Edmunds received another gold medal at the JGP in Belarus, after placing second in the short and first in the free. At the Junior Grand Prix Final in Fukuoka, Japan, she had trouble in the short program, placing fifth, but was second in the free skate and finished fourth overall.

Edmunds competed on the senior level for the first time at the 2014 U.S. Championships. She won the silver medal behind Gracie Gold after placing second in both segments of the competition. On January 12, Edmunds was named to the U.S. team for the Olympics and Worlds. Making her senior international debut, she finished ninth with a total score of 183.25 at the Winter Olympics in Sochi, Russia after placing seventh in the short program and ninth in the free skate. A month later, Edmunds competed at the 2014 World Championships in Saitama, Japan. She placed twelfth in the short program but moved up after placing fifth in the free skate, finishing eighth overall with a score of 187.50.

=== 2014–2015 season: Four Continents title ===
Edmunds began her season with gold at the 2014 U.S. International Classic, an ISU Challenger Series event. She was assigned to two Grand Prix events, the 2014 Cup of China and 2014 NHK Trophy. At her senior Grand Prix debut, Edmunds finished fourth in China and eighth in Japan.

At the 2015 U.S. Championships, Edmunds placed third in the short program but fourth in the free skate, finishing fourth overall. She won the pewter medal behind bronze medalist Karen Chen. However, Chen was not age-eligible to go to the World Championships, so Edmunds was named to both Four Continents and World teams.

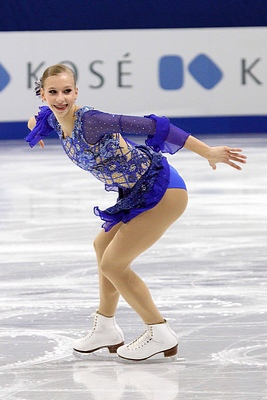
Edmunds at the 2015 Four Continents.

Edmunds won gold at the 2015 Four Continents after placing fourth in the short program and first in the free skate.

At the 2015 World Championships, Edmunds placed seventh in both segments of the competition, finishing eighth overall.

=== 2015–2016 season ===
Edmunds was assigned to compete at the 2015 Skate Canada International and 2015 Rostelecom Cup. She finished sixth in Canada and fourth in Russia. She won the silver medal behind Gracie Gold at the 2016 U.S. Championships, after placing first in the short program and second in the free. She withdrew from the 2016 Four Continents Championships because she lacked time to break in new skates. The old pair of skates, which she had worn for two years, were too soft to be used.

In February 2016, an MRI showed that Edmunds had a bone bruise on the navicular bone in her right foot, an injury which arose after she "started jumping too early in the new skates". As a result, she withdrew from the 2016 World Championships in Boston. After a break, she resumed skating but the problem resurfaced in June; she decided to limit herself to off-ice training for a month and then returned to the ice.

=== 2016–2020: Injuries ===
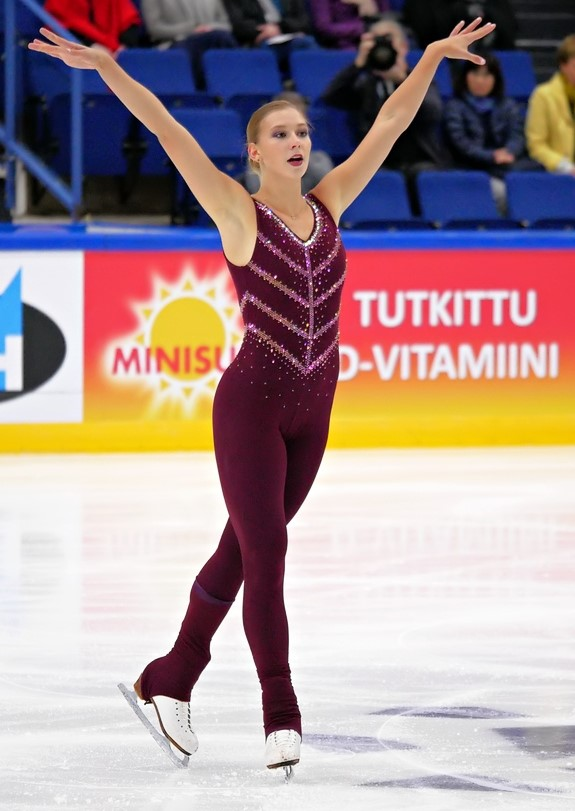
Edmunds during her short program at the 2017 CS Finlandia Trophy

Edmunds resumed skating in August 2016 but paused her training in November after the bone bruise returned; she was concerned about the possibility of a career-ending fracture in the navicular bone. She withdrew from her two Grand Prix competitions, the 2016 Rostelecom Cup and 2016 NHK Trophy. In January 2017, she withdrew from the U.S. Championships. Edmunds returned to the ice in March 2017.

Edmunds qualified to the 2018 U.S. Figure Skating Championships in her hometown of San Jose. She skated a strong short program, though with reduced technical difficulty, and finished 7th. During the practice session before the free program, Edmunds felt a shooting pain in her foot and withdrew from the free program, fearing her previous navicular bone injury had returned.

Edmunds did not compete during the 2018–2019 season due to a bone bruise on her right foot. She told Nick Zaccardi of NBC Sports: "The bone bruise that I had was very deep and very serious for such a small bone in my foot. It required a lot of time off the ice, off really physical activity impact on my foot to really heal it properly." Edmunds missed out on qualifying for the 2020 U.S. Figure Skating Championships after placing fifth at the Pacific Coast Sectionals.

=== Retirement ===
On July 15, 2020, Edmunds stated in an interview that she left competitive skating and was looking forward to other opportunities in skating and her career. She mentioned that she was proud of her accomplishments and if it had not been for the COVID-19 pandemic, she would have been in a full training mode for the season.

== Programs ==
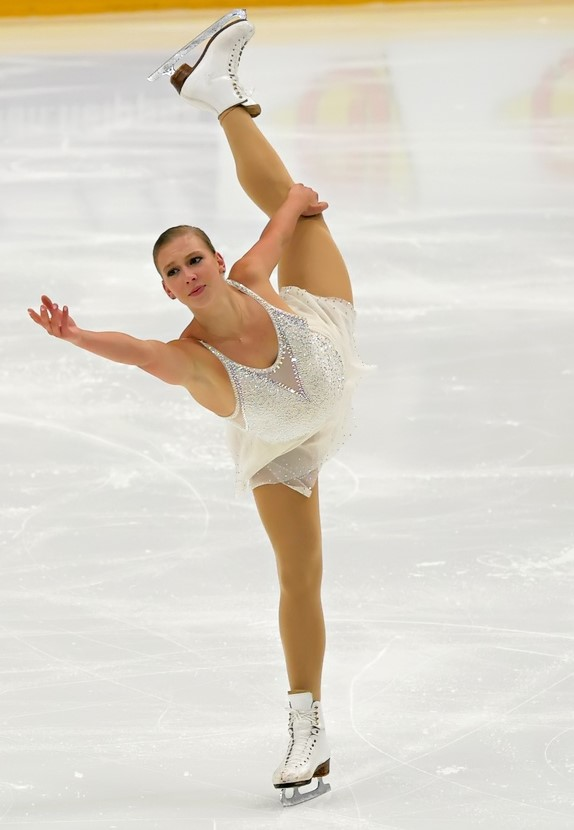
Edmunds performing a Kerrigan spiral during her free skate at the 2017 CS Finlandia Trophy

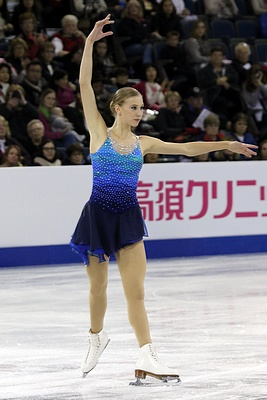
Edmunds performing her short program at the 2015 Skate Canada International

Season	Short program	Free skating	Exhibition
2019–2020	Macavity: The Mystery Cat (from Cats) by Andrew Lloyd Webber performed by The Hit Crew; The Old Grumpie Cat As Made Famous By performed by Studio Group		
2018–2019	Did not compete this season		
2017–2018	Palladio by Karl Jenkins choreo. by Rudy Galindo	Bilitis – Générique; Time to Say Goodbye performed by Sarah Brightman choreo. by Rudy Galindo	
2016–2017	Not shown in competition: Palladio by Karl Jenkins choreo. by Rudy Galindo	Not shown in competition: Bilitis – Générique; Time to Say Goodbye performed by Sarah Brightman choreo. by Rudy Galindo	
2015–2016	Moonlight Sonata by Ludwig van Beethoven performed by Liberace; Presto Agitato performed by N. Lugansky choreo. by Rudy Galindo	Gone with the Wind by Max Steiner choreo. by Rudy Galindo; Introduction; Invitation to the Dance; War; Return to Tara	Ave Maria performed by Maria Voronova; Americano by Lady Gaga; Dance Again by Jennifer Lopez performed by the Glee cast; California Dreamin' performed by J.D. Fortune
2014–2015	Buleria by Johann Sebastian; Tango Serenata by Gustavo Montesano; Introduction to Buleria by Johann Sebastian choreo. by Rudy Galindo	Peter Pan by James Newton Howard choreo. by Rudy Galindo; Tinker Bell; Fairy Dance	Sixteen Going on Seventeen (from The Sound of Music); Titine by Charlie Chaplin
2013–2014	Pink Cherries Cha Cha Cha; Bésame Mucho; Another Cha Cha by Ballroom Orchestra choreo. by Marina Klimova	Peer Gynt by Edvard Grieg choreo. by Marina Klimova; Solveig's Song; Morning Mood	Uptown Girl by Billy Joel; Billie Jean by Michael Jackson; Make 'Em Laugh performed by Donald O'Connor; I Could Have Danced All Night performed by Marni Nixon; Single Ladies by Beyoncé
2012–2013	Two Guitars (Russian gypsy folk) choreo. by Marina Klimova	Romeo and Juliet by Nino Rota choreo by. Marina Klimova	
2011–2012	Oh Shenandoah; Turkey in the Straw choreo. by Marina Klimova	The Merry Widow by Franz Lehár; Circus Princess by Emmerich Kálmán choreo. by Marina Klimova	

== Competitive highlights ==
GP: Grand Prix; CS: Challenger Series; JGP: Junior Grand Prix

=== 2012–13 to present ===
International
Event	12–13	13–14	14–15	15–16	16–17	17–18
Olympics		9th				
Worlds		8th	8th	WD		
Four Continents			1st	WD		
GP Cup of China			4th			
GP France						10th
GP NHK Trophy			8th		WD	
GP Rostelecom Cup				4th	WD	
GP Skate Canada				6th		
CS Finlandia						13th
CS U.S. Classic			1st			
International: Junior
JGP Final		4th				
JGP Belarus		1st				
JGP Mexico		1st				
Gardena	1st					
National
U.S. Champ.	1st J	2nd	4th	2nd	WD	WD
J = Junior level; TBD = Assigned; WD = Withdrew

=== 2007–08 to 2011–12 ===
National
Event	10–11	11–12
U.S. Championships	7th J	6th J
J = Junior

== Detailed results ==
Small medals for short and free programs awarded only at ISU Championships. Pewter medals for fourth-place finishes awarded only at U.S. national and regional events.

2017–18 season
Date	Event	SP	FS	Total
November 17–19, 2017	2017 Internationaux de France	9; 56.31	10; 101.46	10; 157.77
October 6–8, 2017	2017 CS Finlandia Trophy	14; 49.62	13; 92.58	13; 142.20
2015–16 season
Date	Event	SP	FS	Total
January 15–24, 2016	2016 U.S. Championships	1; 70.19	2; 137.32	2; 207.51
November 20–22, 2015	2015 Rostelecom Cup	5; 65.29	4; 117.91	4; 183.20
October 30 – November 1, 2015	2015 Skate Canada International	5; 56.85	5; 111.84	6; 168.69
2014–15 season
Date	Event	SP	FS	Total
March 23–29, 2015	2015 World Championships	7; 61.71	7; 116.12	8; 177.83
February 9–15, 2015	2015 Four Continents Championships	4; 61.03	1; 122.99	1; 184.02
January 18–25, 2015	2015 U.S. Championships	3; 66.04	4; 126.58	4; 192.62
November 28–30, 2014	2014 NHK Trophy	11; 48.96	5; 112.83	8; 161.79
November 7–9, 2014	2014 Cup of China	7; 50.32	2; 110.95	4; 161.27
September 11–14, 2014	2014 U.S. Classic	1; 63.27	2; 113.08	1; 176.35
2013–14 season
Date	Event	SP	FS	Total
March 24–30, 2014	2014 World Championships	12; 60.59	5; 126.91	8; 187.50
February 7–23, 2014	2014 Winter Olympics – Singles	7; 61.04	9; 122.21	9; 183.25
January 5–12, 2014	2014 U.S. Championships	2; 66.75	2; 126.88	2; 193.63
December 5–8, 2013	2013–14 Junior Grand Prix Final	5; 48.20	2; 113.51	4; 161.71
September 26–28, 2013	2013 Junior Grand Prix in Belarus	2; 52.49	1; 113.28	1; 165.77
September 5–7, 2013	2013 Junior Grand Prix in Mexico	1; 57.78	1; 113.43	1; 171.21
2012–13 season
Date	Event	SP	FS	Total
April 2–3, 2013	2013 Gardena Spring Trophy (Junior)	1; 50.69	1; 107.76	1; 158.45
January 19–27, 2013	2013 U.S. Championships (Junior)	1; 58.17	1; 101.70	1; 159.87
