= 2015 Four Continents Figure Skating Championships =

2015 Four Continents Championships
- Type: ISU Championship
- Date: February 9 – 15
- Season: 2014–15
- Location: Seoul, South Korea
- Host: Korea Skating Union
- Venue: Mokdong Ice Rink

Champions
- Men's singles: (Kazakhstan) Denis Ten
- Ladies' singles: (United States) Polina Edmunds
- Pairs: (Canada) Meagan Duhamel / Eric Radford
- Ice dance: (Canada) Kaitlyn Weaver / Andrew Poje
- Previous: 2014 Four Continents Championships
- Next: 2016 Four Continents Championships

The 2015 Four Continents Figure Skating Championships was a Senior ISU figure skating championship held in the 2014–15 season. Skaters competed in the disciplines of men's singles, ladies' singles, pair skating, and ice dancing for the title of Four Continents Champion. The event's name refers to the Americas, Asia, Africa, and Oceania, which are four of the continents represented in the Olympic rings, omitting Europe.

In February 2015, the Korea Skating Union organised a competition that was held at the Mokdong Ice Rink in Seoul, South Korea. The rink has a seating capacity of 5,000 spectators.

The 2015 competition featured a total of ninety-one athletes from fifteen nations from North America, Africa, Asia and Oceania. There were twenty-six competitors in the men's event and nineteen competitors in the ladies' event. There was also pair teams and thirteen ice dancing teams.

== Qualification ==
The competition was open to skaters from non-European member nations of the International Skating Union who reach the age of 15 before July 1, 2014. The corresponding competition for European skaters will be the 2015 European Championships.

National associations selected up to three skaters to compete in both singles disciplines and three couples in both Pairs and Ice Dancing. Selection is based on each associations own criteria but the ISU mandates that their selections achieve a minimum technical elements score (TES) at an international event prior to the Four Continents.

=== Minimum TES ===
Minimum technical scores (TES)
Discipline	SP / SD	FS / FD
Men	25	45
Ladies	20	36
Pairs	20	36
Ice dancing	19	29
Must be achieved at an ISU-recognized international event in the ongoing or preceding season. SP and FS scores may be attained at different events.

== Entries ==
Country	Men	Ladies	Pairs	Ice dancing
Argentina	Denis Margalik			
Australia	Andrew Dodds; Brendan Kerry	Kailani Craine; Brooklee Han		
Brazil		Isadora Williams		
Canada	Nam Nguyen; Jeremy Ten; Liam Firus	Gabrielle Daleman; Alaine Chartrand; Véronik Mallet	Meagan Duhamel / Eric Radford; Lubov Ilyushechkina / Dylan Moscovitch; Kirsten Moore-Towers / Michael Marinaro	Kaitlyn Weaver / Andrew Poje; Piper Gilles / Paul Poirier; Alexandra Paul / Mitchell Islam
China	Guan Yuhang; Wang Yi; Yan Han	Li Zijun	Pang Qing / Tong Jian; Peng Cheng / Zhang Hao; Sui Wenjing / Han Cong	Wang Shiyue / Liu Xinyu; Zhang Yiyi / Wu Nan; Zhao Yue / Zheng Xun
Chinese Taipei	Chih-I Tsao; Jui-Shu Chen			
Hong Kong	Ronald Lam; Harry Hau Yin Lee			
Japan	Shoma Uno; Takahito Mura; Daisuke Murakami	Satoko Miyahara; Rika Hongo; Yuka Nagai	Narumi Takahashi / Ryuichi Kihara	Emi Hirai / Marien de la Asuncion
Kazakhstan	Denis Ten; Abzal Rakimgaliev			Karina Uzurova / Ilias Ali
Malaysia	Julian Zhi Jie Yee			
Mexico		Reyna Hamui		Pilar Maekawa / Leonardo Maekawa
Philippines		Melissa Bulanhagui; Alisson Krystle Perticheto		
South Korea	Lee June-hyoung; Kim Jin-seo; Byun Se-jong	Park So-youn; Kim Hae-jin; Chea Song-joo		Rebeka Kim / Kirill Minov
United States	Jason Brown; Joshua Farris; Adam Rippon	Samantha Cesario; Polina Edmunds; Gracie Gold	Haven Denney / Brandon Frazier; Tarah Kayne / Daniel O'Shea; Alexa Scimeca / Chris Knierim	Madison Chock / Evan Bates; Kaitlin Hawayek / Jean-Luc Baker; Maia Shibutani / Alex Shibutani
Uzbekistan	Misha Ge			

=== Withdrawals ===
- On 10 February 2015, Japanese ice dancers Cathy Reed / Chris Reed withdrew due to Chris Reed's knee injury.
- On 10 February 2015, Philippines' Michael Christian Martinez withdrew due to hip and ankle injury.
- On 13 February 2015, Chinese ice dancers Zhang Yiyi / Wu Nan withdrew before the free dance due to Yiyi's injury.

== Schedule ==
All times are Korea Standard Time (UTC+9).

Day	Date	Start	Finish	Discipline	Event
Day 1	Thursday, 12 February	11:30	13:40	Ice dancing	Short dance
Day 1	Thursday, 12 February	14:10	15:55	Pairs	Short program
Day 1	Thursday, 12 February	16:30	17:00		Opening ceremony
Day 1	Thursday, 12 February	17:15	21:20	Men	Short program
Day 2	Friday, 13 February	13:30	16:00	Ice dancing	Free dance
Day 2	Friday, 13 February	16:00	16:15	Ice dancing	Victory ceremony
Day 2	Friday, 13 February	17:00	19:50	Ladies	Short program
Day 3	Saturday, 14 February	14:30	16:30	Pairs	Free skating
Day 3	Saturday, 14 February	16:30	16:45	Pairs	Victory ceremony
Day 3	Saturday, 14 February	17:30	21:35	Men	Free skating
Day 3	Saturday, 14 February	21:35	21:50	Men	Victory ceremony
Day 4	Sunday, 15 February	12:30	15:45	Ladies	Free skating
Day 4	Sunday, 15 February	15:45	16:00	Ladies	Victory ceremony
Day 4	Sunday, 15 February	17:30	19:30		Exhibition gala

== Overview and record ==
2014 Men's champion Takahito Mura & Pair's Champions Wenjing Sui / Cong Han participated in the competition. 2014 Ladies' champion Kanako Murakami & Ice dancing champions Madison Hubbell / Zachary Donohue did not defend their titles as they were not selected by their respected National associations to compete at the 2015 Four Continents Figure Skating Championships.

Argentina was represented by a skater at the Four Continents Championships for the first time in history.

== Results ==
=== Men ===
==== Final results ====
Rank	Name	Nation	Total points	SP		FS	
1	Denis Ten	Kazakhstan	289.46	1	97.61	1	191.85
2	Joshua Farris	United States	260.01	5	84.29	2	175.72
3	Yan Han	China	259.47	3	87.34	4	172.13
4	Daisuke Murakami	Japan	256.47	6	82.86	3	173.61
5	Shoma Uno	Japan	256.45	2	88.90	5	167.55
6	Jason Brown	United States	243.21	9	75.86	6	167.35
7	Takahito Mura	Japan	235.75	4	84.88	7	150.87
8	Misha Ge	Uzbekistan	226.20	7	82.25	9	143.95
9	Wang Yi	China	214.76	10	72.83	11	141.93
10	Adam Rippon	United States	212.30	12	68.37	10	143.93
11	Nam Nguyen	Canada	209.33	14	63.78	8	145.55
12	Jeremy Ten	Canada	207.75	8	77.09	14	130.66
13	Ronald Lam	Hong Kong	202.81	13	63.89	12	138.92
14	Liam Firus	Canada	199.81	11	70.21	16	129.60
15	Kim Jin-seo	South Korea	199.64	17	61.53	13	138.11
16	Denis Margalik	Argentina	191.25	18	60.81	15	130.44
17	Brendan Kerry	Australia	181.25	16	63.23	18	118.02
18	Lee June-hyoung	South Korea	180.06	15	63.35	19	116.71
19	Chih-I Tsao	Chinese Taipei	178.46	21	55.27	17	123.19
20	Abzal Rakimgaliev	Kazakhstan	168.10	19	57.54	20	110.56
21	Guan Yuhang	China	162.51	22	54.99	21	107.52
22	Julian Zhi Jie Yee	Malaysia	157.35	20	57.02	22	100.00
23	Byun Se-jong	South Korea	154.20	23	54.20	23	100.00
24	Harry Hau Yin Lee	Hong Kong	134.10	24	51.10	24	83.00
Did not advance to Free Skating
25	Andrew Dodds	Australia	—N/a	25	46.91	—N/a	
26	Jui-Shu Chen	Chinese Taipei	—N/a	26	44.48	—N/a	

==== Short program ====
In the Short Program, the Program Component Score (PCS) is calculated by adding the averaged score of each of the five different components (each component is originally out of 10 marks)- Skating Skills (SS), Transitions & Linking Footwork (TR), Performance & Execution (PE), Choreography & Composition (CH) and Interpretation (IN). That total is then multiplied by 1.00. In other words, the Program Component Score is marked out of 50 points.

Pl.	Name	Nation	TSS	TES	PCS	SS	TR	PE	CH	IN	Ded.	StN.
1	Denis Ten	Kazakhstan	97.61	52.86	44.75	8.82	8.54	9.14	9.04	9.21	0.00	#26
2	Shoma Uno	Japan	88.90	49.72	39.18	8.11	7.46	7.89	7.86	7.86	0.00	#22
3	Yan Han	China	87.34	47.44	39.90	8.21	7.68	8.04	8.04	7.93	0.00	#24
4	Takahito Mura	Japan	84.88	45.77	39.11	8.04	7.46	7.89	7.93	7.79	0.00	#21
5	Joshua Farris	United States	84.29	44.53	39.76	7.82	7.61	8.11	8.04	8.18	0.00	#20
6	Daisuke Murakami	Japan	82.86	45.43	37.43	7.64	7.07	7.68	7.54	7.50	0.00	#14
7	Misha Ge	Uzbekistan	82.25	43.25	39.00	7.71	7.36	7.96	7.93	8.04	0.00	#25
8	Jeremy Ten	Canada	77.09	40.94	36.15	7.18	7.00	7.29	7.29	7.39	0.00	#15
9	Jason Brown	United States	75.86	36.50	39.36	7.75	7.68	7.93	7.96	8.04	0.00	#23
10	Wang Yi	China	72.83	40.54	32.29	6.61	6.11	6.57	6.46	6.54	0.00	#11
11	Liam Firus	Canada	70.21	37.25	32.96	6.64	6.36	6.57	6.68	6.71	0.00	#2
12	Adam Rippon	United States	68.37	31.55	36.82	7.61	6.86	7.39	7.46	7.50	0.00	#17
13	Ronald Lam	Hong Kong	63.89	35.64	29.25	5.96	5.54	5.82	6.00	5.93	1.00	#7
14	Nam Nguyen	Canada	63.78	31.77	33.01	6.75	6.36	6.43	6.79	6.68	1.00	#19
15	Lee June-hyoung	South Korea	63.35	30.74	32.61	6.64	6.18	6.61	6.68	6.50	0.00	#18
16	Brendan Kerry	Australia	63.23	33.55	30.68	6.32	5.79	6.11	6.32	6.14	1.00	#10
17	Kim Jin-seo	South Korea	61.53	29.82	31.71	6.61	6.00	6.39	6.39	6.32	0.00	#16
18	Denis Margalik	Argentina	60.81	31.31	30.50	6.07	5.86	6.21	6.18	6.18	1.00	#8
19	Abzal Rakimgaliev	Kazakhstan	57.54	29.04	28.50	5.96	5.14	5.79	5.86	5.75	0.00	#6
20	Julian Zhi Jie Yee	Malaysia	57.02	31.16	27.86	5.68	5.32	5.54	5.71	5.61	2.00	#12
21	Chih-I Tsao	Chinese Taipei	55.27	27.06	28.21	5.79	5.32	5.75	5.71	5.64	0.00	#9
22	Guan Yuhang	China	54.99	28.41	27.58	5.79	5.18	5.54	5.57	5.50	1.00	#5
23	Byun Se-jong	South Korea	54.20	27.49	26.71	5.61	4.96	5.39	5.43	5.32	0.00	#13
24	Harry Hau Yin Lee	Hong Kong	51.10	28.06	23.04	4.61	4.29	4.75	4.68	4.71	0.00	#1
25	Andrew Dodds	Australia	46.91	22.60	25.31	5.21	4.71	5.04	5.21	5.14	1.00	#3
26	Jui-Shu Chen	Chinese Taipei	44.48	22.80	21.68	4.54	4.00	4.39	4.54	4.21	0.00	#4

==== Free skating ====
In the Free Skating, the Program Component Score (PCS) is calculated by adding the averaged score of each of the five different components (each component is originally out of 10 marks)- Skating Skills (SS), Transitions & Linking Footwork (TR), Performance & Execution (PE), Choreography & Composition (CH) and Interpretation (IN). That total is then multiplied by 2.00. In other words, the Program Component Score is marked out of 100 points.

Pl.	Name	Nation	TSS	TES	PCS	SS	TR	PE	CH	IN	Ded.	StN.
1	Denis Ten	Kazakhstan	191.85	100.45	91.40	9.21	8.75	9.32	9.21	9.21	0.00	#22
2	Joshua Farris	United States	175.72	91.02	84.70	8.25	8.14	8.57	8.64	8.65	0.00	#21
3	Daisuke Murakami	Japan	173.61	91.47	82.14	8.39	7.96	8.32	8.29	8.11	0.00	#24
4	Yan Han	China	172.13	88.99	83.14	8.54	7.89	8.46	8.29	8.39	0.00	#19
5	Shoma Uno	Japan	167.55	86.11	82.44	8.50	7.93	8.25	8.29	8.25	1.00	#23
6	Jason Brown	United States	167.35	84.23	83.12	8.21	8.11	8.39	8.39	8.46	0.00	#13
7	Takahito Mura	Japan	150.87	72.37	78.50	8.07	7.54	7.89	7.93	7.82	0.00	#20
8	Nam Nguyen	Canada	145.55	78.47	67.08	6.82	6.32	6.75	6.86	6.79	0.00	#7
9	Misha Ge	Uzbekistan	143.95	68.29	75.66	7.57	7.11	7.75	7.61	7.79	0.00	#15
10	Adam Rippon	United States	143.93	70.01	75.92	7.68	7.14	7.71	7.68	7.75	2.00	#14
11	Wang Yi	China	141.93	70.73	71.20	7.21	6.71	7.32	7.18	7.18	0.00	#18
12	Ronald Lam	Hong Kong	138.92	75.10	64.82	6.54	6.11	6.61	6.61	6.54	1.00	#9
13	Kim Jin-seo	South Korea	138.11	72.91	65.20	6.64	6.07	6.71	6.57	6.61	0.00	#8
14	Jeremy Ten	Canada	130.66	58.78	73.88	7.43	7.11	7.29	7.54	7.57	2.00	#16
15	Denis Margalik	Argentina	130.44	66.46	63.98	6.46	6.18	6.64	6.32	6.39	0.00	#10
16	Liam Firus	Canada	129.60	61.96	69.64	7.21	6.68	6.89	7.00	7.04	2.00	#17
17	Chih-I Tsao	Chinese Taipei	123.19	63.91	59.28	6.18	5.57	6.14	5.86	5.89	0.00	#6
18	Brendan Kerry	Australia	118.02	58.08	59.94	6.32	5.75	5.86	6.18	5.86	0.00	#11
19	Lee June-hyoung	South Korea	116.71	54.01	63.70	6.46	6.14	6.32	6.50	6.43	1.00	#12
20	Abzal Rakimgaliev	Kazakhstan	110.56	56.06	55.50	5.71	5.11	5.64	5.61	5.68	1.00	#4
21	Guan Yuhang	China	107.52	52.60	55.92	5.71	5.18	5.68	5.75	5.64	1.00	#3
22	Julian Zhi Jie Yee	Malaysia	100.33	48.47	51.86	5.43	4.79	5.36	5.21	5.14	0.00	#1
23	Byun Se-jong	South Korea	100.00	49.30	50.70	5.21	4.71	5.04	5.18	5.21	0.00	#2
24	Harry Hau Yin Lee	Hong Kong	83.00	40.36	43.64	4.57	4.04	4.36	4.46	4.39	1.00	#5

=== Ladies ===
==== Final results ====
Rank	Name	Nation	Total points	SP		FS	
1	Polina Edmunds	United States	184.02	4	61.03	1	122.99
2	Satoko Miyahara	Japan	181.59	1	64.84	2	116.75
3	Rika Hongo	Japan	177.44	3	61.28	3	116.16
4	Gracie Gold	United States	176.58	2	62.67	5	113.91
5	Zijun Li	China	175.92	5	60.28	4	115.64
6	Yuka Nagai	Japan	168.09	7	56.94	8	111.15
7	Gabrielle Daleman	Canada	167.09	8	55.25	6	111.84
8	Samantha Cesario	United States	166.76	9	54.95	7	111.81
9	Park So-youn	South Korea	163.75	10	53.47	9	110.28
10	Alaine Chartrand	Canada	161.22	6	58.50	10	102.72
11	Kim Hae-jin	South Korea	147.30	11	51.41	12	95.89
12	Kailani Craine	Australia	142.16	12	47.91	13	94.25
13	Chea Song-joo	South Korea	139.09	15	42.16	11	96.93
14	Veronik Mallet	Canada	130.15	13	42.92	14	87.23
15	Melissa Bulanhagui	Philippines	126.32	16	41.67	15	84.65
16	Alisson Krystle Perticheto	Philippines	115.87	17	41.63	16	74.24
17	Brooklee Han	Australia	114.02	18	40.68	17	73.34
18	Isadora Williams	Brazil	113.96	14	42.68	18	71.28
19	Reyna Hamui	Mexico	105.94	19	39.93	19	66.01

==== Short program ====
In the Short Program, the Program Component Score (PCS) is calculated by adding the averaged score of each of the five different components (each component is originally out of 10 marks)- Skating Skills (SS), Transitions & Linking Footwork (TR), Performance & Execution (PE), Choreography & Composition (CH) and Interpretation (IN). That total is then multiplied by 0.80. In other words, the Program Component Score is marked out of 40 points.

Pl.	Name	Nation	TSS	TES	PCS	SS	TR	PE	CH	IN	Ded.	StN.
1	Satoko Miyahara	Japan	64.84	35.81	29.03	7.25	7.11	7.36	7.43	7.14	0.00	#17
2	Gracie Gold	United States	62.67	32.53	30.14	7.64	7.32	7.43	7.61	7.68	0.00	#16
3	Rika Hongo	Japan	61.28	33.31	27.97	7.14	6.71	7.07	7.04	7.00	0.00	#18
4	Polina Edmunds	United States	61.03	33.26	27.77	7.00	6.75	7.07	6.96	6.93	0.00	#13
5	Li Zijun	China	60.28	31.80	28.48	7.18	6.89	7.25	7.18	7.11	0.00	#19
6	Alaine Chartrand	Canada	58.50	32.23	26.27	6.68	6.18	6.71	6.64	6.64	0.00	#10
7	Yuka Nagai	Japan	56.94	31.59	25.35	6.50	6.07	6.54	6.32	6.25	0.00	#7
8	Gabrielle Daleman	Canada	55.25	29.10	26.15	6.61	6.29	6.54	6.71	6.54	0.00	#11
9	Samantha Cesario	United States	54.95	28.40	26.55	6.57	6.50	6.61	6.71	6.79	0.00	#15
10	Park So-youn	South Korea	53.47	27.99	25.48	6.61	6.18	6.43	6.39	6.25	0.00	#14
11	Kim Hae-jin	South Korea	51.41	28.72	22.69	6.00	5.29	5.86	5.64	5.57	0.00	#4
12	Kailani Craine	Australia	47.91	27.71	20.20	5.00	4.89	5.11	5.04	5.21	0.00	#2
13	Véronik Mallet	Canada	42.29	23.21	21.71	5.64	5.36	5.25	5.50	5.39	2.00	#8
14	Isadora Williams	Brazil	42.68	22.70	19.98	5.04	4.79	4.96	5.11	5.07	0.00	#3
15	Chea Song-joo	South Korea	42.16	21.84	20.32	5.21	4.86	5.07	5.18	5.07	0.00	#1
16	Melissa Bulanhagui	Philippines	41.67	22.36	19.31	4.89	4.57	4.82	4.96	4.89	0.00	#6
17	Alisson Krystle Perticheto	Philippines	41.63	23.34	19.29	4.79	4.50	4.93	4.86	5.04	1.00	#5
18	Brooklee Han	Australia	40.68	21.54	20.14	5.07	4.89	4.89	5.25	5.07	1.00	#12
19	Reyna Hamui	Mexico	39.93	20.93	19.00	4.71	4.43	4.75	4.82	5.04	0.00	#9

==== Free skating ====
In the Free Skating, the Program Component Score (PCS) is calculated by adding the averaged score of each of the five different components (each component is originally out of 10 marks)- Skating Skills (SS), Transitions & Linking Footwork (TR), Performance & Execution (PE), Choreography & Composition (CH) and Interpretation (IN). That total is then multiplied by 1.60. In other words, the Program Component Score is marked out of 80 points.

Pl.	Name	Nation	TSS	TES	PCS	SS	TR	PE	CH	IN	Ded.	StN.
1	Polina Edmunds	United States	122.99	63.83	59.16	7.36	7.11	7.57	7.43	7.50	0.00	#16
2	Satoko Miyahara	Japan	116.75	61.05	56.70	7.29	6.86	7.07	7.18	7.04	1.00	#17
3	Rika Hongo	Japan	116.16	59.89	56.27	7.18	6.71	7.14	7.14	7.00	0.00	#15
4	Li Zijun	China	115.64	58.44	57.20	7.25	6.86	7.25	7.25	7.14	0.00	#18
5	Gracie Gold	United States	113.91	53.50	60.41	7.61	7.50	7.25	7.71	7.68	0.00	#19
6	Gabrielle Daleman	Canada	111.84	58.19	53.65	6.79	6.46	6.89	6.68	6.71	0.00	#14
7	Samantha Cesario	United States	111.81	56.28	55.53	6.75	6.57	6.96	7.21	7.21	0.00	#12
8	Yuka Nagai	Japan	111.15	59.38	51.77	6.75	6.11	6.54	6.57	6.39	0.00	#13
9	Park So-youn	South Korea	110.28	59.80	51.48	6.64	6.00	6.54	6.57	6.43	1.00	#11
10	Alaine Chartrand	Canada	102.72	52.27	50.45	6.64	5.96	6.14	6.36	6.43	0.00	#10
11	Chea Song-joo	South Korea	96.93	51.26	45.67	5.86	5.43	5.75	5.75	5.75	0.00	#9
12	Kim Hae-jin	South Korea	95.89	53.92	42.97	5.86	4.82	5.64	5.29	5.25	1.00	#5
13	Kailani Craine	Australia	94.25	50.98	43.27	5.61	5.14	5.57	5.36	5.36	0.00	#8
14	Veronik Mallet	Canada	87.23	44.59	44.64	5.75	5.29	5.57	5.61	5.68	2.00	#7
15	Melissa Bulanhagui	Philippines	84.65	46.35	38.30	4.93	4.57	4.86	4.86	4.71	0.00	#1
16	Alisson Krystle Perticheto	Philippines	74.24	37.94	37.30	4.82	4.39	4.79	4.64	4.68	1.00	#4
17	Brooklee Han	Australia	73.34	39.51	37.83	5.11	4.61	4.39	4.82	4.71	4.00	#3
18	Isadora Williams	Brazil	71.28	33.66	38.62	5.07	4.57	4.75	4.86	4.89	1.00	#6
19	Reyna Hamui	Mexico	66.01	31.02	35.99	4.71	4.11	4.46	4.57	4.64	1.00	#2

=== Pairs ===
==== Final results ====
Rank	Name	Nation	Total points	SP		FS	
1	Meagan Duhamel / Eric Radford	Canada	219.48	1	75.67	1	143.81
2	Peng Cheng / Zhang Hao	China	201.45	2	69.81	3	131.64
3	Pang Qing / Tong Jian	China	199.99	4	66.87	2	133.12
4	Sui Wenjing / Han Cong	China	198.88	3	69.19	4	129.69
5	Alexa Scimeca / Chris Knierim	United States	187.98	5	63.54	5	124.44
6	Lubov Iliushechkina / Dylan Moscovitch	Canada	173.50	6	60.13	6	113.37
7	Haven Denney / Brandon Frazier	United States	167.57	9	56.98	7	110.59
8	Tarah Kayne / Daniel O'Shea	United States	166.67	8	57.91	8	108.76
9	Kirsten Moore-Towers / Michael Marinaro	Canada	160.70	7	59.30	9	101.40
10	Narumi Takahashi / Ryuichi Kihara	Japan	132.84	10	45.63	10	87.21

==== Short program ====
In the Short Program, the Program Component Score (PCS) is calculated by adding the averaged score of each of the five different components (each component is originally out of 10 marks)- Skating Skills (SS), Transitions & Linking Footwork (TR), Performance & Execution (PE), Choreography & Composition (CH) and Interpretation (IN). That total is then multiplied by 0.80. In other words, the Program Component Score is marked out of 40 points.

Pl.	Name	Nation	TSS	TES	PCS	SS	TR	PE	CH	IN	Ded.	StN.
1	Meagan Duhamel / Eric Radford	Canada	75.67	41.07	34.60	8.71	8.50	8.71	8.57	8.75	0.00	#8
2	Peng Cheng / Zhang Hao	China	69.81	36.76	33.05	8.25	8.14	8.29	8.25	8.39	0.00	#9
3	Sui Wenjing / Han Cong	China	69.19	37.33	31.86	7.93	7.86	8.00	8.04	8.00	0.00	#5
4	Pang Qing / Tong Jian	China	66.87	33.65	33.22	8.43	7.96	8.39	8.29	8.46	0.00	#7
5	Alexa Scimeca / Chris Knierim	United States	63.54	33.06	30.48	7.64	7.36	7.79	7.64	7.68	0.00	#10
6	Lubov Iliushechkina / Dylan Moscovitch	Canada	60.13	31.76	28.37	7.04	6.68	7.29	7.21	7.25	0.00	#1
7	Kirsten Moore-Towers / Michael Marinaro	Canada	59.30	31.76	27.54	6.89	6.61	6.93	7.00	7.00	0.00	#2
8	Tarah Kayne / Daniel O'Shea	United States	57.91	30.85	27.06	6.68	6.54	6.82	6.82	6.96	0.00	#4
9	Haven Denney / Brandon Frazier	United States	56.98	29.12	28.86	7.32	7.00	7.18	7.25	7.32	1.00	#6
10	Narumi Takahashi / Ryuichi Kihara	Japan	45.63	23.83	22.80	5.79	5.54	5.71	5.79	5.68	1.00	#3

==== Free skating ====
In the Free Skating, the Program Component Score (PCS) is calculated by adding the averaged score of each of the five different components (each component is originally out of 10 marks)- Skating Skills (SS), Transitions & Linking Footwork (TR), Performance & Execution (PE), Choreography & Composition (CH) and Interpretation (IN). That total is then multiplied by 1.60. In other words, the Program Component Score is marked out of 80 points.

Pl.	Name	Nation	TSS	TES	PCS	SS	TR	PE	CH	IN	Ded.	StN.
1	Meagan Duhamel / Eric Radford	Canada	143.81	73.39	70.42	8.93	8.61	8.86	8.79	8.82	0.00	#8
2	Pang Qing / Tong Jian	China	133.12	62.32	70.80	8.75	8.61	8.89	8.86	9.14	0.00	#10
3	Peng Cheng / Zhang Hao	China	131.64	65.77	66.87	8.43	8.18	8.36	8.39	8.43	1.00	#9
4	Sui Wenjing / Han Cong	China	129.69	63.93	65.76	8.29	8.07	8.32	8.29	8.14	0.00	#7
5	Alexa Scimeca / Chris Knierim	United States	124.44	63.36	61.08	7.75	7.46	7.71	7.61	7.64	0.00	#4
6	Lubov Iliushechkina / Dylan Moscovitch	Canada	113.37	55.89	57.48	7.21	7.18	7.18	7.21	7.14	0.00	#5
7	Haven Denney / Brandon Frazier	United States	110.59	55.08	56.51	7.14	6.93	7.00	7.18	7.07	1.00	#1
8	Tarah Kayne / Daniel O'Shea	United States	108.76	54.50	55.26	6.93	6.75	6.79	7.18	6.89	1.00	#3
9	Kirsten Moore-Towers / Michael Marinaro	Canada	101.40	48.11	54.29	6.93	6.64	6.61	6.96	6.79	1.00	#6
10	Narumi Takahashi / Ryuichi Kihara	Japan	87.21	44.27	43.94	5.71	5.32	5.50	5.61	5.32	1.00	#2

=== Ice dancing ===
==== Final results ====
Rank	Name	Nation	Total points	SD		FD	
1	Kaitlyn Weaver / Andrew Poje	Canada	177.46	3	68.31	1	109.15
2	Madison Chock / Evan Bates	United States	176.18	1	70.38	2	105.80
3	Maia Shibutani / Alex Shibutani	United States	170.79	2	69.65	3	101.14
4	Piper Gilles / Paul Poirier	Canada	162.25	4	63.45	4	98.80
5	Kaitlin Hawayek / Jean-Luc Baker	United States	149.98	6	58.31	5	91.67
6	Alexandra Paul / Mitchell Islam	Canada	149.92	5	61.34	6	88.58
7	Wang Shiyue / Liu Xinyu	China	130.95	7	48.71	7	82.24
8	Emi Hirai / Marien de la Asuncion	Japan	122.67	8	47.80	8	74.87
9	Rebeka Kim / Kirill Minov	South Korea	120.76	9	46.54	9	74.22
10	Zhao Yue / Zheng Xun	China	115.12	10	43.59	10	71.53
11	Pilar Maekawa / Leonardo Maekawa	Mexico	106.27	12	40.86	11	65.41
12	Karina Uzurova / Ilias Ali	Kazakhstan	102.54	13	39.84	12	62.70
WD	Zhang Yiyi / Wu Nan	China	withdrew	11	42.54	withdrew	

==== Short dance ====
In the Short Dance, the Program Component Score (PCS) is calculated by adding the averaged score of each of the five different components (each component is originally out of 10 marks)- Skating Skills (SS), Transitions & Linking Footwork (TR), Performance & Execution (PE), Choreography & Composition (CC) and Interpretation & Timing (IT). That total is then multiplied by 0.80. In other words, the Program Component Score is marked out of 40 points.

Pl.	Name	Nation	TSS	TES	PCS	SS	TR	PE	CC	IT	Ded.	StN.
1	Madison Chock / Evan Bates	United States	70.38	34.96	35.42	8.68	8.68	8.93	8.96	9.04	0.00	#12
2	Maia Shibutani / Alex Shibutani	United States	69.65	35.85	33.80	8.43	8.21	8.54	8.61	8.46	0.00	#11
3	Kaitlyn Weaver / Andrew Poje	Canada	68.31	32.12	36.19	8.93	8.75	9.14	9.29	9.14	0.00	#10
4	Piper Gilles / Paul Poirier	Canada	63.45	32.13	31.32	7.79	7.82	7.79	8.07	7.68	0.00	#13
5	Alexandra Paul / Mitchell Islam	Canada	61.34	31.71	29.63	7.36	7.18	7.50	7.43	7.57	0.00	#7
6	Kaitlin Hawayek / Jean-Luc Baker	United States	58.31	28.68	29.63	7.32	7.21	7.46	7.54	7.50	0.00	#9
7	Wang Shiyue / Liu Xinyu	China	48.71	26.62	23.09	5.71	5.54	5.86	5.89	5.86	1.00	#5
8	Emi Hirai / Marien de la Asuncion	Japan	47.80	26.63	22.17	5.57	5.21	5.50	5.75	5.68	1.00	#4
9	Rebeka Kim / Kirill Minov	South Korea	46.54	23.53	23.01	5.79	5.54	5.79	5.79	5.86	0.00	#8
10	Zhao Yue / Zheng Xun	China	43.59	21.39	22.20	5.57	5.21	5.68	5.68	5.61	0.00	#1
11	Zhang Yiyi / Wu Nan	China	42.54	20.56	22.98	5.82	5.54	5.71	5.86	5.79	1.00	#6
12	Pilar Maekawa / Leonardo Maekawa	Mexico	40.86	22.16	18.70	4.68	4.43	4.68	4.96	4.64	0.00	#2
13	Karina Uzurova / Ilias Ali	Kazakhstan	39.84	19.77	20.07	5.07	4.75	5.07	5.11	5.07	0.00	#3

==== Free dance ====
In the Free Dance, the Program Component Score (PCS) is calculated by adding the averaged score of each of the five different components (each component is originally out of 10 marks)- Skating Skills (SS), Transitions & Linking Footwork (TR), Performance & Execution (PE), Choreography & Composition (CC) and Interpretation & Timing (IT). That total is then multiplied by 1.20. In other words, the Program Component Score is marked out of 60 points.

Pl.	Name	Nation	TSS	TES	PCS	SS	TR	PE	CC	IT	Ded.	StN.
1	Kaitlyn Weaver / Andrew Poje	Canada	109.15	53.27	55.88	9.25	9.21	9.36	9.43	9.32	0.00	#11
2	Madison Chock / Evan Bates	United States	105.80	51.93	53.87	8.89	8.75	9.07	9.04	9.14	0.00	#12
3	Maia Shibutani / Alex Shibutani	United States	101.14	49.16	51.98	8.68	8.25	8.71	8.86	8.82	0.00	#9
4	Piper Gilles / Paul Poirier	Canada	98.80	48.46	49.94	8.18	8.00	8.43	8.50	8.50	0.00	#10
5	Kaitlin Hawayek / Jean-Luc Baker	United States	91.67	46.62	45.05	7.50	7.25	7.57	7.54	7.68	0.00	#5
6	Alexandra Paul / Mitchell Islam	Canada	88.58	44.92	44.66	7.50	7.25	7.29	7.61	7.57	1.00	#13
7	Wang Shiyue / Liu Xinyu	China	82.24	43.84	38.40	6.39	6.11	6.50	6.50	6.50	0.00	#8
8	Emi Hirai / Marien de la Asuncion	Japan	74.87	39.98	34.89	5.93	5.50	5.93	5.89	5.82	0.00	#7
9	Rebeka Kim / Kirill Minov	South Korea	74.22	39.71	35.51	5.82	5.57	6.00	6.14	6.07	1.00	#6
10	Zhao Yue / Zheng Xun	China	71.53	38.46	33.07	5.46	5.21	5.64	5.64	5.61	0.00	#3
11	Pilar Maekawa / Leonardo Maekawa	Mexico	65.41	37.38	28.03	4.71	4.36	4.61	4.89	4.79	0.00	#1
12	Karina Uzurova / Ilias Ali	Kazakhstan	62.70	32.82	29.88	4.82	4.54	5.11	5.29	5.14	0.00	#4
WD	Zhang Yiyi / Wu Nan	China	withdrew									#2

== Medals summary ==
=== Medalists ===
Medals for overall placement:

Discipline	Gold	Silver	Bronze
Men	(Kazakhstan) Denis Ten	(United States) Joshua Farris	(China) Yan Han
Ladies	(United States) Polina Edmunds	(Japan) Satoko Miyahara	(Japan) Rika Hongo
Pairs	(Canada) Meagan Duhamel / Eric Radford	(China) Peng Cheng / Zhang Hao	(China) Pang Qing / Tong Jian
Ice dancing	(Canada) Kaitlyn Weaver / Andrew Poje	(United States) Madison Chock / Evan Bates	(United States) Maia Shibutani / Alex Shibutani

Small medals for placement in the short segment:

Discipline	Gold	Silver	Bronze
Men	(Kazakhstan) Denis Ten	(Japan) Shoma Uno	(China) Yan Han
Ladies	(Japan) Satoko Miyahara	(United States) Gracie Gold	(Japan) Rika Hongo
Pairs	(Canada) Meagan Duhamel / Eric Radford	(China) Peng Cheng / Zhang Hao	(China) Sui Wenjing / Han Cong
Ice dancing	(United States) Madison Chock / Evan Bates	(United States) Maia Shibutani / Alex Shibutani	(Canada) Kaitlyn Weaver / Andrew Poje

Small medals for placement in the free segment:

Discipline	Gold	Silver	Bronze
Men	(Kazakhstan) Denis Ten	(United States) Joshua Farris	(Japan) Daisuke Murakami
Ladies	(United States) Polina Edmunds	(Japan) Satoko Miyahara	(Japan) Rika Hongo
Pairs	(Canada) Meagan Duhamel / Eric Radford	(China) Pang Qing / Tong Jian	(China) Peng Cheng / Zhang Hao
Ice dancing	(Canada) Kaitlyn Weaver / Andrew Poje	(United States) Madison Chock / Evan Bates	(United States) Maia Shibutani / Alex Shibutani

=== Medals by country ===
Table of medals for overall placement:

Rank	Nation	Gold	Silver	Bronze	Total
1	Canada (CAN)	2	0	0	2
2	United States (USA)	1	2	1	4
3	Kazakhstan (KAZ)	1	0	0	1
4	China (CHN)	0	1	2	3
5	Japan (JPN)	0	1	1	2
Totals (5 entries)		4	4	4	12

== Prize money ==
Prize money is awarded to skaters who achieve a top 12 placement in each discipline as follows:

	Prize money (US$)	
Placement	Men's / Ladies' singles	Pairs / Ice dancers
1st	15,000	22,500
2nd	9,000	13,500
3rd	6,000	9,000
4th	4,500	6,750
5th	3,250	5,000
6th	2,500	3,750
7th	2,250	3,500
8th	2,000	3,000
9th	1,750	2,500
10th	1,500	2,250
11th	1,250	1,750
12th	1,000	1,500
Pairs and ice dancing couples split the amount. Total prize money: $250,000 USD.
