= 2015 World Figure Skating Championships =

2015 edition of the World Figure Skating Championships

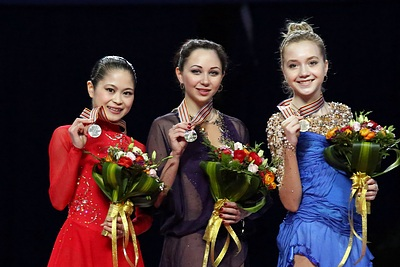
- 2015 World Championships women's podium
- Type: ISU Championship
- Date: March 23 – 29
- Season: 2014–15
- Location: Shanghai, China
- Host: Chinese Skating Association
- Venue: Shanghai Oriental Sports Center

Champions
- Men's singles: (Spain) Javier Fernández
- Ladies' singles: (Russia) Elizaveta Tuktamysheva
- Pairs: (Canada) Meagan Duhamel / Eric Radford
- Ice dance: (France) Gabriella Papadakis / Guillaume Cizeron
- Previous: 2014 World Championships
- Next: 2016 World Championships

The 2015 World Figure Skating Championships was an international figure skating competition in the 2014–15 season. Figure skaters competed for the title of World champion in men's singles, ladies' singles, pairs, and ice dancing.

In June 2012, it was announced that Shanghai, China would host the 2015 Worlds. All events were held at the Shanghai Oriental Sports Center.

== Qualification ==
Skaters are eligible for the event if they are representing an ISU member nations and have reached the age of 15 before 1 July 2014 in their place of birth. National associations select their entries according to their own criteria but the ISU mandates that their selections achieve a minimum technical elements score (TES) at an international event prior to the World Championships.

=== Minimum TES ===
Minimum technical scores (TES)
Discipline	SP / SD	FS / FD
Men	34	64
Ladies	27	47
Pairs	25	43
Ice dancing	29	39
Must be achieved at an ISU-recognized international event in the ongoing or preceding season. SP and FS scores may be attained at different events.

=== Number of entries per discipline ===
Based on the results of the 2014 World Championships, each ISU member nation can field one to three entries per discipline.

Spots	Men	Ladies	Pairs	Dance
3	Japan; United States	Japan; Russia; United States	Canada; China; Russia	Canada; Russia; United States
2	Canada; China; Czech Republic; France; Russia; Spain	Canada; Italy; South Korea	France; Germany; Italy; United States	France; Italy; United Kingdom
If not listed above, one entry is allowed.

== Entries ==
Member nations began announcing their selections in January 2015.

Country	Men	Ladies	Pairs	Ice dancing
Armenia		Anastasia Galustyan		
Australia	Brendan Kerry	Brooklee Han		
Austria		Kerstin Frank	Miriam Ziegler / Severin Kiefer	Barbora Silna / Juri Kurakin
Belarus	Pavel Ignatenko		Maria Paliakova / Nikita Bochkov	Viktoria Kavaliova / Yurii Bieliaiev
Canada	Nam Nguyen; Jeremy Ten	Gabrielle Daleman; Alaine Chartrand	Meagan Duhamel / Eric Radford; Lubov Ilyushechkina / Dylan Moscovitch; Julianne Séguin / Charlie Bilodeau	Kaitlyn Weaver / Andrew Poje; Piper Gilles / Paul Poirier; Alexandra Paul / Mitchell Islam
China	Song Nan; Yan Han	Li Zijun	Pang Qing / Tong Jian; Peng Cheng / Zhang Hao; Sui Wenjing / Han Cong	Wang Shiyue / Liu Xinyu
Czech Republic	Michal Březina; Petr Coufal	Eliška Březinová		
Denmark				Laurence Fournier Beaudry / Nikolaj Sørensen
Estonia				Irina Shtork / Taavi Rand
Finland		Kiira Korpi		Cecilia Torn / Jussiville Partanen
France	Florent Amodio; Chafik Besseghier	Maé-Bérénice Méité	Vanessa James / Morgan Ciprès	Gabriella Papadakis / Guillaume Cizeron
Georgia		Elene Gedevanishvili		
Germany	Peter Liebers	Nicole Schott	Mari Vartmann / Aaron Van Cleave	Nelli Zhiganshina / Alexander Gazsi
(United Kingdom) Great Britain			Amani Fancy / Christopher Boyadji	Olivia Smart / Joseph Buckland
Hong Kong	Ronald Lam			
Hungary		Ivett Tóth		Carolina Moscheni / Ádám Lukács
Israel	Alexei Bychenko	Netta Schreiber		Allison Reed / Vasili Rogov
Italy	Ivan Righini	Roberta Rodeghiero; Giada Russo	Nicole Della Monica / Matteo Guarise; Valentina Marchei / Ondřej Hotárek	Anna Cappellini / Luca Lanotte; Charlene Guignard / Marco Fabbri
Japan	Yuzuru Hanyu; Takahiko Kozuka; Takahito Mura	Satoko Miyahara; Rika Hongo; Kanako Murakami	Narumi Takahashi / Ryuichi Kihara	Cathy Reed / Chris Reed
Kazakhstan	Denis Ten			
South Korea	Lee June-hyoung	Kim Hae-jin; Park So-youn		Rebeka Kim / Kirill Minov
Latvia		Angelīna Kučvaļska		Olga Jakushina / Andrey Nevskiy
Lithuania		Aleksandra Golovkina		
Netherlands		Niki Wories		
Norway		Anne Line Gjersem		
Poland				Natalia Kaliszek / Maksym Spodyriev
Philippines	Michael Christian Martinez	Alisson Krystle Perticheto		
Russia	Maxim Kovtun; Sergei Voronov	Elena Radionova; Elizaveta Tuktamysheva; Anna Pogorilaya	Kristina Astakhova / Alexei Rogonov; Yuko Kavaguti / Alexander Smirnov; Evgenia Tarasova / Vladimir Morozov	Elena Ilinykh / Ruslan Zhiganshin; Ksenia Monko / Kirill Khaliavin; Alexandra Stepanova / Ivan Bukin
Slovakia		Nicole Rajicova		Federica Testa / Lukáš Csölley
Slovenia		Daša Grm		
Spain	Javier Fernández			Sara Hurtado / Adrià Díaz
Sweden	Alexander Majorov	Joshi Helgesson		
Switzerland	Stéphane Walker	Eveline Brunner		
Turkey				Alisa Agafonova / Alper Uçar
Ukraine	Yaroslav Paniot	Natalia Popova		Oleksandra Nazarova / Maxim Nikitin
United States	Jason Brown; Joshua Farris; Adam Rippon	Polina Edmunds; Gracie Gold; Ashley Wagner	Haven Denney / Brandon Frazier; Alexa Scimeca / Chris Knierim	Madison Chock / Evan Bates; Madison Hubbell / Zachary Donohue; Maia Shibutani / Alex Shibutani
Uzbekistan	Misha Ge			

- Anna Ovcharova declined Switzerland's nomination after a poor performance at the 2015 Hellmut Seibt Memorial and was replaced by Eveline Brunner.
- On March 19, 2015 Penny Coomes / Nicholas Buckland withdrew due to Coomes having an illness. They were not replaced.

== Results ==
=== Men ===
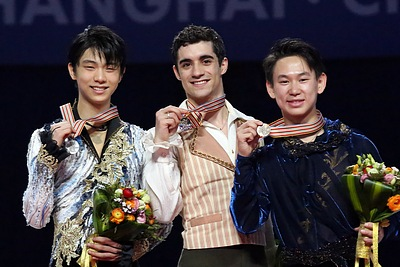
2015 Worlds Figure Skating Championships Podium

The Men's short program was held on March 27. The free skate was held on March 28.

Rank	Name	Nation	Total points	SP		FS	
1	Javier Fernández	Spain	273.90	2	92.74	2	181.16
2	Yuzuru Hanyu	Japan	271.08	1	95.20	3	175.88
3	Denis Ten	Kazakhstan	267.72	3	85.89	1	181.83
4	Jason Brown	United States	248.29	6	84.32	5	163.97
5	Nam Nguyen	Canada	242.59	9	77.73	4	164.86
6	Misha Ge	Uzbekistan	234.89	8	78.52	7	156.37
7	Maxim Kovtun	Russia	230.70	16	70.82	6	159.88
8	Adam Rippon	United States	229.71	11	75.14	8	154.57
9	Florent Amodio	France	229.62	7	80.84	11	148.78
10	Yan Han	China	229.15	5	84.45	13	144.70
11	Joshua Farris	United States	223.04	13	73.52	10	149.52
12	Takahiko Kozuka	Japan	222.69	19	70.15	9	152.54
13	Sergei Voronov	Russia	218.41	4	84.70	17	133.71
14	Ronald Lam	Hong Kong	214.36	14	72.66	14	141.70
15	Michal Březina	Czech Republic	213.83	10	76.84	15	136.99
16	Takahito Mura	Japan	211.74	23	64.93	12	146.81
17	Alexei Bychenko	Israel	209.26	12	74.98	16	137.28
18	Chafik Besseghier	France	199.86	18	70.27	19	129.59
19	Lee June-hyoung	South Korea	197.52	24	64.51	18	133.01
20	Brendan Kerry	Australia	194.57	17	70.36	21	124.21
21	Michael Christian Martinez	Philippines	192.38	22	67.03	20	125.35
22	Jeremy Ten	Canada	183.79	15	72.28	22	111.51
23	Alexander Majorov	Sweden	176.55	21	67.53	23	109.02
24	Yaroslav Paniot	Ukraine	174.52	20	69.09	24	105.43
Did not advance to free skate
25	Ivan Righini	Italy		25	63.05	—N/a	
26	Song Nan	China		26	61.69	—N/a	
27	Petr Coufal	Czech Republic		27	60.31	—N/a	
28	Pavel Ignatenko	Belarus		28	58.78	—N/a	
29	Peter Liebers	Germany		29	54.28	—N/a	
30	Stéphane Walker	Switzerland		30	53.42	—N/a	

=== Ladies ===
The Ladies short program was held on March 26. The free skate was held on March 28, 2015.

Rank	Name	Nation	Total points	SP		FS	
1	Elizaveta Tuktamysheva	Russia	210.36	1	77.62	1	132.74
2	Satoko Miyahara	Japan	193.60	3	67.02	4	126.58
3	Elena Radionova	Russia	191.47	2	69.51	6	121.96
4	Gracie Gold	United States	188.96	8	60.73	2	128.23
5	Ashley Wagner	United States	185.01	11	57.81	3	127.20
6	Rika Hongo	Japan	184.58	5	62.17	5	122.41
7	Kanako Murakami	Japan	179.66	4	65.48	8	114.18
8	Polina Edmunds	United States	177.83	7	61.71	7	116.12
9	Li Zijun	China	165.22	6	61.83	11	103.39
10	Maé-Bérénice Méité	France	162.75	12	57.08	10	105.67
11	Alaine Chartrand	Canada	161.18	10	60.24	12	100.94
12	Park So-youn	South Korea	160.75	15	53.95	9	106.80
13	Anna Pogorilaya	Russia	160.31	9	60.50	13	99.81
14	Joshi Helgesson	Sweden	155.35	13	56.28	14	99.07
15	Nicole Rajičová	Slovakia	152.61	14	54.40	15	98.21
16	Angelīna Kučvaļska	Latvia	141.54	23	45.74	16	95.80
17	Anne Line Gjersem	Norway	139.75	20	49.25	17	90.50
18	Daša Grm	Slovenia	137.45	22	47.21	18	90.24
19	Kim Hae-jin	South Korea	136.24	18	50.03	19	86.21
20	Roberta Rodeghiero	Italy	134.74	17	51.42	21	83.32
21	Gabrielle Daleman	Canada	133.57	21	48.13	20	85.44
22	Elene Gedevanishvili	Georgia	132.25	16	52.11	22	80.14
23	Nicole Schott	Germany	127.56	19	49.29	23	78.27
24	Giada Russo	Italy	120.11	24	43.85	24	76.26
Did not advance to free skate
25	Natalia Popova	Ukraine		25	43.60	—N/a	
26	Ivett Tóth	Hungary		26	43.47	—N/a	
27	Eliška Březinová	Czech Republic		27	43.37	—N/a	
28	Aleksandra Golovkina	Lithuania		28	43.16	—N/a	
29	Anastasia Galustyan	Armenia		29	41.84	—N/a	
30	Netta Schreiber	Israel		30	41.84	—N/a	
31	Kiira Korpi	Finland		31	41.11	—N/a	
32	Niki Wories	Netherlands		32	40.38	—N/a	
33	Eveline Brunner	Switzerland		33	39.69	—N/a	
34	Alisson Krystle Perticheto	Philippines		34	38.75	—N/a	
35	Brooklee Han	Australia		35	35.54	—N/a	
WD	Kerstin Frank	Austria	withdrew from competition				

=== Pairs ===
The pairs short program was held on March 25. The free skate was held on March 26.

Rank	Name	Nation	Total points	SP		FS	
1	Meagan Duhamel / Eric Radford	Canada	221.53	1	76.98	1	144.55
2	Sui Wenjing / Han Cong	China	214.12	3	71.63	2	142.49
3	Pang Qing / Tong Jian	China	212.77	2	72.59	3	140.18
4	Peng Cheng / Zhang Hao	China	206.63	5	69.67	4	136.96
5	Yuko Kavaguti / Alexander Smirnov	Russia	198.91	4	71.59	6	127.32
6	Evgenia Tarasova / Vladimir Morozov	Russia	198.46	6	67.71	5	130.75
7	Alexa Scimeca / Chris Knierim	United States	185.81	7	65.56	7	120.25
8	Julianne Séguin / Charlie Bilodeau	Canada	178.03	10	60.53	10	117.50
9	Vanessa James / Morgan Ciprès	France	177.34	12	58.28	8	119.06
10	Kristina Astakhova / Alexei Rogonov	Russia	173.58	13	55.55	9	118.03
11	Valentina Marchei / Ondřej Hotárek	Italy	172.55	9	60.56	11	111.99
12	Haven Denney / Brandon Frazier	United States	172.51	8	61.32	12	111.19
13	Lubov Iliushechkina / Dylan Moscovitch	Canada	169.91	11	60.32	13	109.59
14	Nicole Della Monica / Matteo Guarise	Italy	151.77	14	54.48	15	97.29
15	Mari Vartmann / Aaron Van Cleave	Germany	147.84	15	47.76	14	100.08
16	Amani Fancy / Christopher Boyadji	(United Kingdom) Great Britain	130.22	16	46.69	16	83.53
Did not advance to free skate
17	Maria Paliakova / Nikita Bochkov	Belarus		17	46.17	—N/a	
18	Miriam Ziegler / Severin Kiefer	Austria		18	45.99	—N/a	
19	Narumi Takahashi / Ryuichi Kihara	Japan		19	44.54	—N/a	

=== Ice dancing ===
The short dance was held on March 25. The free dance was held on March 27, 2015.

Rank	Name	Nation	Total points	SD		FD	
1	Gabriella Papadakis / Guillaume Cizeron	France	184.28	4	71.94	1	112.34
2	Madison Chock / Evan Bates	United States	181.34	1	74.47	2	106.87
3	Kaitlyn Weaver / Andrew Poje	Canada	179.42	2	72.68	3	106.74
4	Anna Cappellini / Luca Lanotte	Italy	177.50	3	72.39	4	105.11
5	Maia Shibutani / Alex Shibutani	United States	172.03	6	69.32	5	102.71
6	Piper Gilles / Paul Poirier	Canada	165.22	7	65.90	6	99.32
7	Elena Ilinykh / Ruslan Zhiganshin	Russia	164.84	5	69.46	9	95.38
8	Ksenia Monko / Kirill Khaliavin	Russia	159.13	10	62.36	8	96.77
9	Alexandra Stepanova / Ivan Bukin	Russia	156.95	14	59.62	7	97.33
10	Madison Hubbell / Zachary Donohue	United States	156.56	11	61.43	10	95.13
11	Laurence Fournier Beaudry / Nikolaj Sørensen	Denmark	156.23	9	62.40	11	93.83
12	Charlène Guignard / Marco Fabbri	Italy	153.84	12	61.02	12	92.82
13	Alexandra Paul / Mitchell Islam	Canada	152.59	8	64.38	14	88.21
14	Sara Hurtado / Adrià Díaz	Spain	148.67	15	59.16	13	89.51
15	Federica Testa / Lukáš Csölley	Slovakia	142.29	13	60.07	15	82.22
16	Alisa Agafonova / Alper Uçar	Turkey	136.47	16	56.07	16	80.40
17	Oleksandra Nazarova / Maxim Nikitin	Ukraine	133.80	17	55.08	17	78.72
18	Carolina Moscheni / Ádám Lukács	Hungary	131.01	19	53.05	18	77.96
19	Wang Shiyue / Liu Xinyu	China	128.77	18	54.38	19	74.39
20	Allison Reed / Vasili Rogov	Israel	124.32	20	51.12	20	73.20
Did not advance to free dance
21	Barbora Silná / Juri Kurakin	Austria		21	49.57	—N/a	
22	Cathy Reed / Chris Reed	Japan		22	48.32	—N/a	
23	Irina Shtork / Taavi Rand	Estonia		23	48.04	—N/a	
24	Natalia Kaliszek / Maksym Spodyriev	Poland		24	45.46	—N/a	
25	Cecilia Törn / Jussiville Partanen	Finland		25	45.11	—N/a	
26	Rebeka Kim / Kirill Minov	South Korea		26	45.09	—N/a	
27	Olivia Smart / Joseph Buckland	(United Kingdom) Great Britain		27	44.32	—N/a	
28	Viktoria Kavaliova / Yurii Bieliaiev	Belarus		28	43.21	—N/a	
29	Olga Jakushina / Andrey Nevskiy	Latvia		29	42.37	—N/a	
WD	Nelli Zhiganshina / Alexander Gazsi	Germany	withdrew from competition				

== Medals summary ==
=== Medalists ===
Medals for overall placement:

Discipline	Gold	Silver	Bronze
Men	(Spain) Javier Fernández	(Japan) Yuzuru Hanyu	(Kazakhstan) Denis Ten
Ladies	(Russia) Elizaveta Tuktamysheva	(Japan) Satoko Miyahara	(Russia) Elena Radionova
Pairs	(Canada) Meagan Duhamel / Eric Radford	(China) Sui Wenjing / Han Cong	(China) Pang Qing / Tong Jian
Ice dancing	(France) Gabriella Papadakis / Guillaume Cizeron	(United States) Madison Chock / Evan Bates	(Canada) Kaitlyn Weaver / Andrew Poje

Small medals for placement in the short segment:

Discipline	Gold	Silver	Bronze
Men	(Japan) Yuzuru Hanyu	(Spain) Javier Fernández	(Kazakhstan) Denis Ten
Ladies	(Russia) Elizaveta Tuktamysheva	(Russia) Elena Radionova	(Japan) Satoko Miyahara
Pairs	(Canada) Meagan Duhamel / Eric Radford	(China) Pang Qing / Tong Jian	(China) Sui Wenjing / Han Cong
Ice dancing	(United States) Madison Chock / Evan Bates	(Canada) Kaitlyn Weaver / Andrew Poje	(Italy) Anna Cappellini / Luca Lanotte

Small medals for placement in the free segment:

Discipline	Gold	Silver	Bronze
Men	(Kazakhstan) Denis Ten	(Spain) Javier Fernández	(Japan) Yuzuru Hanyu
Ladies	(Russia) Elizaveta Tuktamysheva	(United States) Gracie Gold	(United States) Ashley Wagner
Pairs	(Canada) Meagan Duhamel / Eric Radford	(China) Sui Wenjing / Han Cong	(China) Pang Qing / Tong Jian
Ice dancing	(France) Gabriella Papadakis / Guillaume Cizeron	(United States) Madison Chock / Evan Bates	(Canada) Kaitlyn Weaver / Andrew Poje

=== By country ===
Table of medals for overall placement:

Rank	Nation	Gold	Silver	Bronze	Total
1	Canada (CAN)	1	0	1	2
1	Russia (RUS)	1	0	1	2
3	France (FRA)	1	0	0	1
3	Spain (ESP)	1	0	0	1
5	Japan (JPN)	0	2	0	2
6	China (CHN)	0	1	1	2
7	United States (USA)	0	1	0	1
8	Kazakhstan (KAZ)	0	0	1	1
Totals (8 entries)		4	4	4	12
