= Frances Rossiter =

British watercolour artist

- Born: 31 March 1833; London
- Died: 25 September 1905 (aged 72); Uppingham, Rutland
- Education: Heatherley School of Fine Art

Frances Tripp 'Fanny' Rossiter (nee Seares) (31 March 1833 - 25 September 1905) was an English Victorian painter who specialised in drawings and watercolour paintings of birds. She exhibited under her married name of Mrs. C. Rossiter.

Frances was born in London in 1833, the second daughter of Samuel Montague Seares, a grocer, and his wife Frances. As a girl she learnt to draw through copying in pencil or chalk. She was first taught to paint in oils by a tutor at the British Museum who set her to copying other paintings. She went on to study at James Mathews Leigh's academy of art in London (now Heatherley School of Fine Art).

Frances had got to know the painter Charles Rossiter, and he taught her drawing and painting. They married on 28 April 1860 and had three sons and two daughters.

Her first painting to be exhibited, Baby, was shown at the Liverpool Academy in 1862. After an illness, she switched to drawing or painting watercolours of birds, and her work began to be exhibited at the Royal Academy in 1866. In total she exhibited 48 pictures in London (12 of which were at the Royal Academy).

In 1872, Frances and Charles moved to Uppingham, Rutland, so he could take up a position as an art teacher at Uppingham School. Frances's work was still being exhibited in 1874, then peters out afterwards.

Frances died in 1905 in Uppingham, Rutland.

== Works ==
- Yellowhammer (1866)
- Chaffinch and Skylark (1866)
- Bullfinch, Bramblefinch, Goldfinch and Siskin (1867)
- The Maiden's Prayer (1867) - oil painting
- Springtime (1868) - oil painting
- Wheatear, Bramblefinch and Hen Chaffinch (1868)
- Greenfinch and Chaffinch (1869)
- Blue Tit and Arbutus Berries (1869)
- Lark and Coal Tit (1870)
- Yellowhammer and Blue Tit (1870)
- Chaffinch and Reed Sparrow (1870)
- Nuthatch and Blue Tit (1871)
- Peewit (1872)
- Blue Tits (exhibited 1884)
