= 2010 U.S. Figure Skating Championships =

Figure skating competition

- Type: National Championship
- Date: January 14 – 24
- Season: 2009–10
- Location: Spokane, Washington
- Venue: Spokane Veterans Memorial Arena

Champions
- Men's singles: Jeremy Abbott
- Ladies' singles: Rachael Flatt
- Pairs: Caydee Denney / Jeremy Barrett
- Ice dance: Meryl Davis / Charlie White
- Previous: 2009 U.S. Championships
- Next: 2011 U.S. Championships

The 2010 U.S. Figure Skating Championships took place between January 14 and 24 at the Spokane Veterans Memorial Arena in Spokane, Washington with AT&T as the title sponsor. Skaters competed in four disciplines – men's singles, ladies' singles, pair skating, and ice dancing – across three levels: senior, junior, and novice. Medals were awarded in four colors: gold (first), silver (second), bronze (third), and pewter (fourth).

The Olympics were to begin 18 days after the end of the U.S. Championships. The senior-level Championship events were therefore spread out over two weekends to allow the skaters approximately four weeks between the end of their event and the start of the corresponding Olympic competition.

The event was among the criteria used to select the U.S. teams for the 2010 Winter Olympics, 2010 World Championships, 2010 Four Continents Championships, and 2010 World Junior Championships.

The senior compulsory dance was the Golden Waltz.

== Olympic team selection ==
The results of the 2010 U.S. Championships were among the criteria used to determine the 2010 Olympic team. The competitions used in the selection process were, in order of priority:

1. 2010 U.S. Championships
2. 2009–10 Grand Prix Final
3. 2009 World Championships
4. 2009 Four Continents Championships
5. 2009 World Junior Championships
6. 2009–10 Junior Grand Prix Final

The United States had qualified 3 Olympic spots in men's singles and ice dancing and 2 Olympic spots in ladies singles and pair skating. The entrants are nominated by U.S. Figure Skating and must be confirmed by the United States Olympic Committee.

The nominees in each discipline were announced following the completion of that discipline's competition. The pairs entrants were nominated on January 16, the men on January 17, and the ladies and ice dancers on January 23.

== Qualification ==
Qualification for the U.S. Championships began at one of nine regional competitions: New England, North Atlantic, South Atlantic, Upper Great Lakes, Eastern Great Lakes, Southwestern, Northwest Pacific, Central Pacific, and Southwest Pacific. The top four finishers in each regional competition advanced to one of three sectional competitions: Eastern, Midwestern, and Pacific Coast. Skaters who placed in the top four at the sectional competitions advanced to the U.S. Championships.

Byes to the competition were given to skaters who had won medals at the 2006 Winter Olympics or the 2009 World Figure Skating Championships; to the top five finishers in each senior-level discipline at the 2009 U.S. Figure Skating Championships; to any skaters who qualified for the 2009–10 Junior or Senior Grand Prix Final in the discipline in which they qualified; and to any skater who was assigned to an international event that occurred at the same time as their sectional championship.

=== Byes ===
The following skaters have been given byes to the 2010 U.S. Championships and did not have to compete at regionals or sectionals.

Men's singles byes
Skater	Section	Level of bye	Reason for bye
Jeremy Abbott	Midwestern Section	Senior	Top 5 placement in 2009
Brandon Mroz	Midwestern Section	Senior	Top 5 placement in 2009
Evan Lysacek	Midwestern Section	Senior	Reigning World medalist & Top 5 placement in 2009
Ryan Bradley	Midwestern Section	Senior	Top 5 placement in 2009
Johnny Weir	Eastern Section	Senior	Top 5 placement in 2009
Richard Dornbush	Pacific Coast Section	Senior	Qualified to Junior Grand Prix Final
Grant Hochstein	Midwestern Section	Senior	Qualified to Junior Grand Prix Final
Ross Miner	Eastern Section	Senior	Qualified to Junior Grand Prix Final
Stephen Carriere	Eastern Section	Senior	Grand Prix assignment (CAN)
Armin Mahbanoozadeh	Eastern Section	Senior	Grand Prix assignment (CAN)
Adam Rippon	Eastern Section	Senior	Grand Prix Assignment (JPN)
Tommy Steenberg	Eastern Section	Senior	Merano Cup assignment

Ladies' singles byes
Skater	Section	Level of bye	Reason for bye
Sasha Cohen	Pacific Coast Section	Senior	Reigning Olympic medalist
Alissa Czisny	Midwestern Section	Senior	Top 5 placement in 2009
Rachael Flatt	Midwestern Section	Senior	Top 5 placement in 2009
Caroline Zhang	Pacific Coast Section	Senior	Top 5 placement in 2009
Ashley Wagner	Eastern Section	Senior	Top 5 placement in 2009
Mirai Nagasu	Pacific Coast Section	Senior	Top 5 placement in 2009
Angela Maxwell	Eastern Section	Senior	Qualified to Junior Grand Prix Final
Christina Gao	Midwestern Section	Senior	Qualified to Junior Grand Prix Final
Ellie Kawamura	Pacific Coast Section	Senior	Qualified to Junior Grand Prix Final
Kiri Baga	Midwestern Section	Junior	Qualified to Junior Grand Prix Final
Becky Bereswill	Midwestern Section	Senior	Grand Prix assignment (JPN)
Alexe Gilles	Midwestern Section	Senior	Grand Prix assignment (USA)
Emily Hughes	Eastern Section	Senior	Grand Prix assignment (USA)

Pair skating byes
Pair team	Section	Level of bye	Reason for bye
Keauna McLaughlin / Rockne Brubaker	Midwestern Section	Senior	Top 5 placement in 2009
Caydee Denney / Jeremy Barrett	Eastern Section	Senior	Top 5 placement in 2009
Rena Inoue / John Baldwin	Pacific Coast Section	Senior	Top 5 placement in 2009
Amanda Evora / Mark Ladwig	Eastern Section	Senior	Top 5 placement in 2009
Brooke Castile / Benjamin Okolski	Midwestern Section	Senior	Top 5 placement in 2009
Britney Simpson / Nathan Miller	Midwestern Section	Junior	Qualified to Junior Grand Prix Final

Ice dancing byes
Ice dance team	Section	Level of bye	Reason for bye
Tanith Belbin / Benjamin Agosto	Midwestern Section	Senior	Reigning Olympic medalist & Reigning World medalist
Meryl Davis / Charlie White	Midwestern Section	Senior	Top 5 placement in 2009
Emily Samuelson / Evan Bates	Midwestern Section	Senior	Top 5 placement in 2009
Kimberly Navarro / Brent Bommentre	Eastern Section	Senior	Top 5 placement in 2009
Madison Hubbell / Keiffer Hubbell	Midwestern Section	Senior	Top 5 placement in 2009
Maia Shibutani / Alex Shibutani	Midwestern Section	Junior	Qualified to Junior Grand Prix Final
Isabella Cannuscio / Ian Lorello	Eastern Section	Junior	Qualified to Junior Grand Prix Final

Ice dancers Morgan Matthews / Leif Gislason would have received a bye due to their 5th-place finish. However, the team dissolved following the 2008–09 season.

== Senior results ==
=== Men ===
Rank	Name	Total points	SP		FS	
1	Jeremy Abbott	263.66	1	87.85	1	175.81
2	Evan Lysacek	238.63	2	83.69	3	154.94
3	Johnny Weir	232.09	3	83.51	5	148.58
4	Ryan Bradley	225.97	6	70.63	2	155.34
5	Adam Rippon	225.07	4	72.91	4	152.16
6	Brandon Mroz	201.27	10	64.45	6	136.82
7	Grant Hochstein	192.73	8	65.55	7	127.18
8	Armin Mahbanoozadeh	190.98	5	72.56	13	118.42
9	Keegan Messing	190.35	12	63.38	8	126.97
10	Jason Wong	186.46	9	64.56	10	121.90
11	Richard Dornbush	184.28	7	65.79	12	118.49
12	Jonathan Cassar	182.23	20	55.53	9	126.70
13	Tommy Steenberg	179.21	16	59.17	11	120.04
14	Dennis Phan	175.97	13	62.51	15	113.46
15	Douglas Razzano	175.04	11	64.27	17	110.77
16	Parker Pennington	173.03	15	61.58	16	111.45
17	Alexander Johnson	168.29	22	54.29	14	114.00
18	Andrew Gonzales	167.25	14	62.38	19	104.87
19	Shaun Rogers	165.00	18	58.62	18	106.38
20	Michael Solonoski	150.76	21	55.26	20	95.50
21	Wesley Campbell	146.96	19	55.98	21	90.98
22	Daniel Raad	127.38	23	49.32	22	78.06
WD	Stephen Carriere		17	58.68		

=== Ladies ===
Rank	Name	Total points	SP		FS	
1	Rachael Flatt	200.11	3	69.35	1	130.76
2	Mirai Nagasu	188.78	1	70.06	3	118.72
3	Ashley Wagner	184.70	4	62.55	2	122.15
4	Sasha Cohen	174.28	2	69.63	4	104.65
5	Christina Gao	156.53	5	56.26	5	100.27
6	Amanda Dobbs	150.72	6	56.11	7	94.61
7	Beatrisa Liang	147.71	10	51.98	6	95.73
8	Alexe Gilles	143.31	9	53.54	8	89.77
9	Emily Hughes	140.60	8	53.75	10	86.85
10	Alissa Czisny	140.37	7	54.18	11	86.19
11	Caroline Zhang	138.27	11	49.94	9	88.33
12	Melissa Bulanhagui	129.21	14	45.60	12	83.61
13	Becky Bereswill	127.96	15	44.60	13	83.36
14	Samantha Cesario	119.20	16	44.33	15	74.87
15	Laney Diggs	114.38	18	42.87	16	71.51
16	Kristiene Gong	112.92	12	48.11	21	64.81
17	Blake Rosenthal	112.42	17	43.43	18	68.99
18	Chelsea Morrow	111.73	13	46.35	20	65.38
19	Christina-Maria Sperduto	109.89	23	31.62	14	78.27
20	Tatyana Khazova	108.89	19	41.63	19	67.26
21	Ellie Kawamura	103.33	21	33.51	17	69.82
22	Rebecca Stern	97.22	22	32.49	22	64.73
WD	Kayla Howey		20	35.59		

=== Pairs ===
Rank	Name	Total points	SP		FS	
1	Caydee Denney / Jeremy Barrett	190.30	1	63.01	1	127.29
2	Amanda Evora / Mark Ladwig	173.78	3	58.76	3	115.02
3	Rena Inoue / John Baldwin	173.18	4	57.77	2	115.41
4	Brooke Castile / Benjamin Okolski	169.95	5	55.64	4	114.31
5	Keauna McLaughlin / Rockne Brubaker	165.73	7	52.55	5	113.18
6	Caitlin Yankowskas / John Coughlin	164.83	2	62.09	6	102.74
7	Amanda Dobbs / Joseph Jacobsen	152.66	6	55.32	8	97.34
8	Tiffany Vise / Don Baldwin	149.62	9	51.88	7	97.74
9	Molly Aaron / Daniyel Cohen	146.60	8	52.19	9	94.41
10	Marissa Castelli / Simon Shnapir	142.53	11	49.28	10	93.25
11	Tracy Tanovich / Michael Chau	136.56	13	49.00	11	85.56
12	Andrea Best / Trevor Young	130.88	14	45.73	12	85.15
13	Kendra Moyle / Steven Pottenger	128.64	12	49.22	14	79.42
14	Ameena Sheikh / Aaron VanCleave	127.73	10	49.87	15	77.86
15	Lisa Moore / Justin Gaumond	126.25	15	44.15	13	82.10
16	Laura Lepzinski / Ethan Burgess	119.85	16	42.47	16	77.38

=== Ice dance ===
Rank	Name	Total points	CD		OD		FD	
1	Meryl Davis / Charlie White	222.29	1	45.42	1	68.11	1	108.76
2	Tanith Belbin / Benjamin Agosto	218.51	2	45.02	2	66.89	2	106.60
3	Emily Samuelson / Evan Bates	190.69	4	37.36	3	59.60	3	93.73
4	Kimberly Navarro / Brent Bommentre	186.42	3	37.60	4	57.60	4	91.22
5	Madison Chock / Greg Zuerlein	177.48	6	34.12	5	54.87	5	88.49
6	Madison Hubbell / Keiffer Hubbell	173.87	5	34.33	6	54.16	6	85.38
7	Jane Summersett / Todd Gilles	163.08	7	30.72	7	52.48	8	79.88
8	Lynn Kriengkrairut / Logan Giulietti-Schmitt	156.53	9	30.00	9	45.52	7	81.01
9	Trina Pratt / Chris Obzansky	156.42	8	30.43	8	48.86	9	77.13
10	Shannon Wingle / Timothy McKernan	132.43	13	21.75	10	44.73	10	65.95
11	Stephanie Zastrow / Michael Lueck	124.71	11	22.58	13	36.73	11	65.40
12	Katie Wyble / Justin Morrow	123.94	10	23.07	12	36.92	12	63.95
13	Grace Cho / Dmitry Ponomarev	115.12	12	22.39	14	33.86	13	58.87
14	Lauren Corry / Alexander Lorello	113.46	14	19.15	11	40.17	14	54.14
15	Elizabeth Chan / Jason Deveikis	88.10	15	14.39	15	28.63	15	45.08

== Junior results ==
=== Men ===
Rank	Name	Total points	SP		FS	
1	Jason Brown	195.22	2	62.10	2	133.12
2	Joshua Farris	195.03	4	58.24	1	136.79
3	Max Aaron	191.86	1	62.17	3	129.69
4	Scott Dyer	178.49	5	57.34	4	121.15
5	Alexander Zahradnicek	168.64	7	55.20	5	113.44
6	Austin Kanallakan	164.98	3	61.90	7	103.08
7	Juran Yang	154.70	8	54.29	8	100.41
8	Christopher Caluza	153.87	9	54.12	9	99.75
9	Peter Max Dion	151.34	6	55.84	11	95.50
10	Alexander Aiken	150.76	12	47.45	6	103.31
11	Sean Rabbitt	148.55	10	50.94	10	97.61
12	Grisha Fournier	142.77	11	47.77	12	95.00

=== Ladies ===
Rank	Name	Total points	SP		FS	
1	Agnes Zawadzki	171.87	1	63.14	1	108.73
2	Yasmin Siraj	151.05	4	50.72	2	100.33
3	Lindsay Davis	133.97	5	50.22	4	83.75
4	Kiri Baga	127.35	2	55.51	9	71.84
5	Nina Jiang	126.38	11	40.98	3	85.40
6	Felicia Zhang	124.21	8	45.19	5	79.02
7	Angela Wang	123.53	3	52.88	10	70.65
8	Vanessa Lam	121.79	6	48.49	8	73.30
9	McKinzie Daniels	119.69	9	42.91	7	76.78
10	Marissa Secundy	112.71	13	34.09	6	78.62
11	Kendall Wyckoff	110.86	7	46.00	11	64.86
12	Katlynn McNab	99.87	10	42.43	12	57.44
13	Haley Dunne	94.32	12	39.99	13	54.33

=== Pairs ===
Rank	Name	Total points	SP		FS	
1	Felicia Zhang / Taylor Toth	153.80	1	57.16	1	96.64
2	Britney Simpson / Nathan Miller	147.29	2	56.74	2	90.55
3	Erika Smith / Nathan Bartholomay	133.54	4	49.56	4	83.98
4	Carolyn-Ann Alba / Christopher Knierim	133.19	3	52.43	5	80.76
5	Brynn Carman / AJ Reiss	130.00	7	42.54	3	87.46
6	Brittany Chase / Grant Marron	118.31	6	42.59	7	75.72
7	Haven Denney / Daniel Raad	118.18	8	41.86	6	76.32
8	Gretchen Donlan / Andrew Speroff	118.10	5	44.85	9	73.25
9	Olivia Gibbons / Tyler Harris	110.19	10	36.77	8	73.42
10	Megan Gueli / Gabe Woodruff	99.35	9	40.44	11	58.91
11	Becky Du / Sergey Sidorov	93.83	11	33.06	10	60.77

=== Ice dance ===
Rank	Name	Total points	CD		OD		FD	
1	Maia Shibutani / Alex Shibutani	180.69	1	35.72	1	56.17	1	88.80
2	Rachel Tibbetts / Collin Brubaker	160.61	2	33.76	3	49.24	3	77.61
3	Piper Gilles / Zachary Donohue	160.21	4	30.81	2	51.04	2	78.36
4	Isabella Cannuscio / Ian Lorello	151.88	3	30.94	4	47.65	4	73.29
5	Anastasia Olson / Jordan Cowan	146.86	8	28.71	5	47.11	5	71.04
6	Lauri Bonacorsi / Travis Mager	144.90	5	29.88	7	45.88	6	69.14
7	Anastasia Cannuscio / Colin McManus	143.76	6	29.50	8	45.84	8	68.42
8	Charlotte Lichtman / Dean Copely	143.43	7	28.78	6	45.97	7	68.68
9	Gabrielle Friedenberg / Benjamin Nykiel	130.72	11	25.30	9	40.11	9	65.31
10	Katharine Zeigler / Baxter Burbank	116.47	9	25.65	10	35.21	10	55.61
11	Natalie Wojton / Michael Soyfer	112.46	10	25.58	11	32.90	11	53.98
12	Kristen Nardozzi / Robert Cuthbertson	104.14	13	22.20	12	32.76	13	49.18
13	Janine Halstead / Robert Knopf	101.46	14	18.53	13	32.15	12	50.78
14	Katie Donaldson / Brock Jacobs	97.63	12	22.33	14	29.02	14	46.28

== International team selections ==
=== Winter Olympics ===
The nominations to the Olympic team were announced as follows:

	Men	Ladies	Pairs	Ice dancing
1	Jeremy Abbott	Rachael Flatt	Caydee Denney / Jeremy Barrett	Meryl Davis / Charlie White
2	Evan Lysacek	Mirai Nagasu	Amanda Evora / Mark Ladwig	Tanith Belbin / Benjamin Agosto
3	Johnny Weir			Emily Samuelson / Evan Bates
1st alternate	Ryan Bradley	Ashley Wagner	Rena Inoue / John Baldwin	Kimberly Navarro / Brent Bommentre
2nd alternate	Adam Rippon	Sasha Cohen	Keauna McLaughlin / Rockne Brubaker	Madison Chock / Greg Zuerlein
3rd alternate	Brandon Mroz	Christina Gao	Brooke Castile / Ben Okolski	Madison Hubbell / Keiffer Hubbell

=== World Championships ===
The World Championships team was announced as follows:

	Men	Ladies	Pairs	Ice dancing
1	Jeremy Abbott	Rachael Flatt	Caydee Denney / Jeremy Barrett	Meryl Davis / Charlie White
2	Evan Lysacek	Mirai Nagasu	Amanda Evora / Mark Ladwig	Tanith Belbin / Benjamin Agosto
3	Johnny Weir			Emily Samuelson / Evan Bates
1st alternate	Ryan Bradley	Ashley Wagner	Keauna McLaughlin / Rockne Brubaker	Kimberly Navarro / Brent Bommentre
2nd alternate	Adam Rippon	Sasha Cohen	Brooke Castile / Ben Okolski	Madison Chock / Greg Zuerlein
3rd alternate	Brandon Mroz	Bebe Liang	Caitlin Yankowskas / John Coughlin	Madison Hubbell / Keiffer Hubbell
4th alternate			Amanda Dobbs / Joseph Jacobsen	

=== Four Continents Championships ===
The Four Continents Championships team was announced as follows:

	Men	Ladies	Pairs	Ice dancing
1	Ryan Bradley	Amanda Dobbs	Brooke Castile / Ben Okolski	Madison Chock / Greg Zuerlein
2	Brandon Mroz	Alexe Gilles	Keauna McLaughlin / Rockne Brubaker	Madison Hubbell / Keiffer Hubbell
3	Adam Rippon	Caroline Zhang	Caitlin Yankowskas / John Coughlin	Jane Summersett / Todd Gilles
1st alternate	Armin Mahbanoozadeh	Melissa Bulanhagui	Marissa Castelli / Simon Shnapir	Lynn Kriengkrairut / Logan Giulietti-Schmitt
2nd alternate	Douglas Razzano	Becky Bereswill	Andrea Best / Trevor Young	Trina Pratt / Chris Obzansky
3rd alternate	Alex Johnson			Shannon Wingle / Timothy McKernan

=== World Junior Championships ===
The World Junior Championships team was announced as follows:

	Men	Ladies	Pairs	Ice dancing
1	Grant Hochstein	Christina Gao	Brynn Carman / A.J. Reiss	Maia Shibutani / Alex Shibutani
2	Armin Mahbanoozadeh	Ashley Wagner	Britney Simpson / Nathan Miller	Rachel Tibbetts / Collin Brubaker
3	Ross Miner	Agnes Zawadzki	Felicia Zhang / Taylor Toth	Piper Gilles / Zachary Donohue
1st alternate	Keegan Messing	Kiri Baga	Ashley Cain / Joshua Reagan	Isabella Cannuscio / Ian Lorello
2nd alternate	Richard Dornbush	Lindsay Davis	Tori Vollmer / Zack Sidhu	Anastasia Olson / Jordan Cowan
3rd alternate	Jason Brown	Melissa Bulanhagui	Kylie Duarte / Colin Grafton	Lauri Bonacorsi / Travis Mager
