= 2009 U.S. Figure Skating Championships =

Figure skating competition

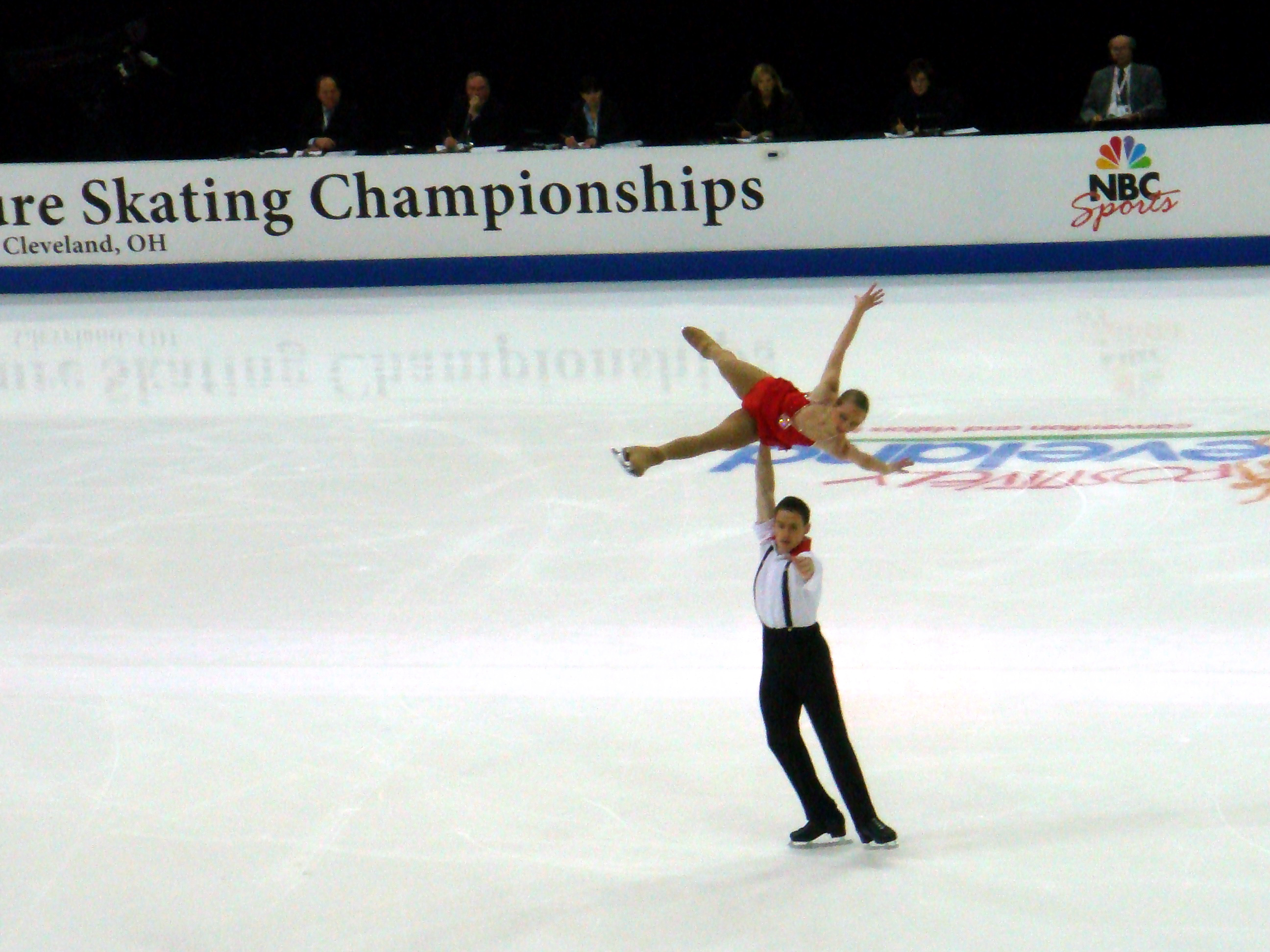
- US Figure Skating Championship
- Type: National Championship
- Date: January 18 – 25
- Season: 2008–09
- Location: Cleveland, Ohio
- Host: U.S. Figure Skating
- Venue: Quicken Loans Arena

Champions
- Men's singles: Jeremy Abbott
- Ladies' singles: Alissa Czisny
- Pairs: Keauna McLaughlin / Rockne Brubaker
- Ice dance: Meryl Davis / Charlie White
- Previous: 2008 U.S. Championships
- Next: 2010 U.S. Championships

The 2009 U.S. Figure Skating Championships took place from January 18 to 25th 2009 at the Quicken Loans Arena in Cleveland, Ohio. Skaters competed in four disciplines – men's singles, ladies' singles, pair skating, and ice dancing – and across three levels: senior, junior, and novice. Medals were awarded in four colors: gold (first), silver (second), bronze (third), and pewter (fourth).

The event was used to determine the U.S. teams for the 2009 World Championships, 2009 Four Continents Championships, and 2009 World Junior Championships.

== Qualifying ==
Qualification for the U.S. Championships began at one of nine regional competitions. The regions are New England, North Atlantic, South Atlantic, Upper Great Lakes, Eastern Great Lakes, Southwestern, Northwest Pacific, Central Pacific, and Southwest Pacific. The top four finishers in each regional advance to one of three sectional competitions (Eastern, Midwestern, and Pacific Coast). Skaters who placed in the top four at sectionals advanced to the U.S. Championships.

The top five finishers in each discipline from the previous year were given byes to the U.S. Championships, as were any skaters who qualify for the Junior or the Senior Grand Prix Final. Skaters were also given byes through a qualifying competition if they are assigned to an international event during the time that qualifying event was to take place. For example, if a skater competed at an event at the same time as his or her regional competition, that skater would receive a bye to sectionals. If a skater competed at an event at the same time as his or her sectional competition, that skater would qualify for the national event without having had to compete at a sectional championship.

== Competition notes ==
- Reigning ice dancing champions Tanith Belbin / Benjamin Agosto withdrew before the event began due to injury to Agosto.
- 2007 ladies' champion Kimberly Meissner withdrew before the event due to injury.
- Senior ladies Katrina Hacker and Mirai Nagasu both earned an overall score of 54.79 in the short program. The tie was broken by the technical elements mark, by which Hacker had beaten Nagasu by 2.05 points. Hacker therefore placed 5th while Nagasu placed 6th in that segment of the competition.
- Senior ladies Laney Diggs and Kristine Musademba tied for 10th place in the overall score. The tie was broken by the free skating segment and so Diggs placed ahead of Musademba overall.

== Senior results ==
=== Men's singles ===
Rank	Name	Total points	SP		FS	
1	Jeremy Abbott	241.89	1	86.40	1	155.49
2	Brandon Mroz	229.70	4	74.88	2	154.82
3	Evan Lysacek	229.10	2	83.59	4	145.51
4	Ryan Bradley	221.40	5	74.05	3	147.35
5	Johnny Weir	203.99	7	70.76	5	133.23
6	Curran Oi	194.03	6	72.76	8	121.27
7	Adam Rippon	193.76	12	62.22	6	131.54
8	Parker Pennington	192.48	3	76.17	10	116.31
9	Stephen Carriere	185.31	8	69.36	11	115.95
10	Tommy Steenberg	184.99	14	59.77	7	125.22
11	Dennis Phan	183.25	9	69.11	12	114.14
12	Shaun Rogers	175.72	10	64.13	13	111.59
13	Eliot Halverson	171.14	18	51.09	9	120.05
14	Douglas Razzano	164.14	16	57.00	14	107.14
15	William Brewster	152.80	13	60.23	16	92.57
16	Jonathan Cassar	151.10	17	55.72	15	95.38
17	Jason Wong	140.73	11	63.40	17	77.33
WD	Nicholas LaRoche		15	58.01		
WD	Scott Smith					

=== Ladies' singles ===
Rank	Name	Total points	SP		FS	
1	Alissa Czisny	178.06	1	65.75	3	112.31
2	Rachael Flatt	173.78	2	60.19	2	113.59
3	Caroline Zhang	171.08	3	58.91	4	112.17
4	Ashley Wagner	165.33	12	50.28	1	115.05
5	Mirai Nagasu	159.99	6	54.79	5	105.20
6	Katrina Hacker	156.28	5	54.79	6	101.49
7	Brittney Rizo	151.23	4	55.43	9	95.80
8	Angela Maxwell	151.22	13	50.02	7	101.20
9	Alexe Gilles	151.20	11	50.30	8	100.90
10	Laney Diggs	147.48	9	52.30	10	95.18
11	Kristine Musademba	147.48	7	53.48	11	94.00
12	Joelle Forte	145.33	8	53.13	13	92.20
13	Taylor Firth	139.49	16	46.29	12	93.20
14	Beatrisa Liang	135.15	10	51.49	16	83.66
15	Molly Oberstar	130.71	15	46.73	15	83.98
16	Chrissy Hughes	128.32	21	37.86	14	90.46
17	Tenile Victorsen	126.74	14	46.84	17	79.90
18	Becky Bereswill	124.57	17	46.25	18	78.32
19	Karen Zhou	120.05	18	44.96	19	75.09
20	Melissa Telecky	106.96	20	40.70	20	66.26
21	Blake Rosenthal	101.39	19	43.48	21	57.91
22	Brittney Westdorp	88.70	23	33.99	22	54.71
23	Tatyana Khazova	86.03	22	34.97	23	51.06

=== Pairs ===
Rank	Name	Total points	SP		FS	
1	Keauna McLaughlin / Rockne Brubaker	178.76	2	61.12	1	117.64
2	Caydee Denney / Jeremy Barrett	176.27	1	61.51	2	114.76
3	Rena Inoue / John Baldwin	171.08	3	61.11	3	109.97
4	Amanda Evora / Mark Ladwig	159.95	6	52.98	4	106.97
5	Brooke Castile / Benjamin Okolski	157.01	5	54.46	6	102.55
6	Chloé Katz / Joseph Lynch	156.15	7	52.06	5	104.09
7	Caitlin Yankowskas / John Coughlin	153.67	4	56.09	8	97.58
8	Tiffany Vise / Derek Trent	148.91	8	51.16	7	97.75
9	Laura Lepzinski / Ethan Burgess	141.21	12	45.09	9	96.12
10	Jessica Rose Paetsch / Drew Meekins	130.87	10	47.67	10	83.20
11	MeeRan Trombley / Laureano Ibarra	129.61	9	48.63	12	80.98
12	Lindsay Davis / Alexander Merritt	125.33	11	45.87	14	79.46
13	Bianca Butler / Joseph Jacobsen	124.46	15	42.73	11	81.73
14	Stephanie Kuban / Steven Elefante	123.21	16	42.25	13	80.96
15	Lisa Moore / Justin Gaumond	112.57	17	38.60	16	73.97
16	Andrea Best / Trevor Young	112.15	19	36.64	15	75.51
17	Chelsi Guillen / Danny Curzon	108.06	13	44.63	18	63.43
18	Jennifer Brunn / Don Baldwin	105.99	14	43.35	19	62.64
19	Kendra Moyle / Steven Pottenger	105.43	18	38.31	17	67.12

=== Ice dance ===
Rank	Name	Total points	CD		OD		FD	
1	Meryl Davis / Charlie White	201.68	1	39.93	1	61.93	1	99.82
2	Emily Samuelson / Evan Bates	181.64	2	36.28	2	56.97	2	88.39
3	Kimberly Navarro / Brent Bommentre	176.30	3	35.22	6	54.30	3	86.78
4	Madison Hubbell / Keiffer Hubbell	171.51	4	32.52	4	54.51	4	84.48
5	Morgan Matthews / Leif Gislason	169.62	6	31.59	3	55.03	5	83.00
6	Jane Summersett / Todd Gilles	169.35	5	32.48	5	54.43	6	82.44
7	Trina Pratt / Chris Obzansky	165.71	7	31.18	7	52.83	7	81.70
8	Lynn Kriengkrairut / Logan Giulietti-Schmitt	151.59	9	27.81	8	48.92	8	74.86
9	Charlotte Maxwell / Nick Traxler	143.60	11	26.74	10	45.10	9	71.76
10	Clare Farrell / Charles Fishpaw	135.30	12	25.78	11	41.11	10	68.41
11	Jessica Perino / William Avila	127.35	10	26.74	13	38.84	11	61.77
12	Lauren Corry / Alexander Lorello	121.62	14	21.59	12	39.50	12	60.53
13	Kellene Ratko / Jonathan Harris	107.58	13	21.74	15	31.37	13	54.47
14	Emma Cyders / Ievgenii Krasniak	107.29	15	20.11	14	36.31	14	50.87
WD	Jennifer Wester / Daniil Barantsev		8	29.66	9	47.65		

== Junior results ==
=== Men's singles ===
Rank	Name	Total points	SP		FS	
1	Ross Miner	183.80	1	66.62	2	117.18
2	Keegan Messing	176.94	2	59.80	3	117.14
3	Alexander Johnson	171.08	7	51.68	1	119.40
4	Grant Hochstein	162.15	9	51.24	4	110.91
5	Austin Kanallakan	160.30	8	51.38	5	108.92
6	Armin Mahbanoozadeh	159.12	3	59.29	8	99.83
7	Alexander Aiken	157.99	10	51.16	6	106.83
8	Andrew Gonzales	153.19	4	58.76	10	94.43
9	Michael Chau	145.78	12	42.87	7	102.91
10	Daniel O'Shea	145.04	11	50.57	9	94.47
11	Juran Yang	142.75	5	58.37	12	84.38
12	Peter Max Dion	141.22	6	52.58	11	88.64
13	David Wang	117.34	13	41.16	13	76.18
14	Pine Kopka-Ross	99.98	14	33.35	14	66.63
WD	Richard Dornbush					

=== Ladies' singles ===
Rank	Name	Total points	SP		FS	
1	DeeDee Leng	132.49	1	53.57	3	78.92
2	Ellie Kawamura	131.25	2	51.82	1	79.43
3	Christina Gao	128.69	3	49.45	2	79.24
4	Kristiene Gong	126.17	4	49.21	5	76.96
5	Kendall Wyckoff	123.88	5	47.12	6	76.76
6	Samantha Cesario	120.90	6	43.47	4	77.43
7	Amanda Dobbs	116.52	7	43.21	8	73.31
8	Carolyn-Ann Alba	112.35	12	37.96	7	74.39
9	Vanessa Lam	111.68	11	39.25	9	72.43
10	Keli Zhou	110.87	8	42.96	10	67.91
11	Gretchen Donlan	106.60	10	39.65	11	66.95
12	Marissa Secundy	105.16	9	42.28	12	62.88
13	Kirsten Olson	95.57	13	33.85	13	61.72

=== Pairs ===
Rank	Name	Total points	SP		FS	
1	Tracy Tanovich / Michael Chau	135.50	3	46.84	1	88.66
2	Brynn Carman / Christopher Knierim	134.92	1	48.31	2	86.61
3	Marissa Castelli / Simon Shnapir	129.87	2	47.57	3	82.30
4	Britney Simpson / Nathan Miller	122.44	4	46.39	5	76.05
5	Molly Aaron / Daniyel Cohen	118.16	7	42.04	4	76.12
6	Brittany Chase / Andrew Speroff	115.82	8	41.86	6	73.96
7	Lauren Farr / Mac Kern	115.79	5	43.41	7	72.38
8	Ameena Sheikh / Aaron VanCleave	113.44	9	41.74	8	71.70
9	Kloe Bautista / Galvani Hopson	109.70	6	42.81	10	66.89
10	Megan Gueli / Grant Marron	108.42	10	40.05	9	68.37
11	Erika Smith / Nathan Bartholomay	101.00	12	35.79	11	65.21
12	Rachel DeRita / Brandon Accardi	97.98	11	37.34	12	60.64
13	Emily Glassberg / Gabe Woodruff	89.05	13	29.52	13	59.53

=== Ice dance ===
Rank	Name	Total points	CD		OD		FD	
1	Madison Chock / Greg Zuerlein	167.81	1	32.90	1	52.89	1	82.02
2	Maia Shibutani / Alex Shibutani	161.03	2	31.98	2	52.70	2	76.35
3	Piper Gilles / Zachary Donohue	151.10	3	29.50	3	47.33	3	74.27
4	Shannon Wingle / Timothy McKernan	145.05	4	28.92	6	45.49	5	70.64
5	Isabella Cannuscio / Ian Lorello	144.80	8	27.58	5	45.90	4	71.32
6	Rachel Tibbetts / Collin Brubaker	143.20	5	28.54	4	47.19	7	67.47
7	Sara Bailey / Kyle Herring	136.18	12	24.86	9	43.63	6	67.69
8	Chloe Wolf / Rhys Ainsworth	134.19	7	27.67	11	41.45	8	65.07
9	Charlotte Lichtman / Dean Copely	133.27	10	26.06	8	44.20	10	63.01
10	Anastasia Cannuscio / Colin McManus	132.52	11	25.49	10	42.11	9	64.92
11	Elyse Matsumoto / Patrick Mays	128.74	9	26.68	7	45.40	11	56.66
12	Katie Wyble / Justin Morrow	116.82	6	28.14	12	35.37	12	53.31
13	Alison Carey / Daniel Donigan	102.58	14	17.51	13	33.59	13	51.48
WD	Brittany Marshall / Ashley Deavers		13	23.11	14	29.64		

== International team selections ==
=== World Championships ===
	Men	Ladies	Pairs	Ice dancing
1	Jeremy Abbott	Alissa Czisny	Keauna McLaughlin / Rockne Brubaker	Meryl Davis / Charlie White
2	Evan Lysacek	Rachael Flatt	Caydee Denney / Jeremy Barrett	Emily Samuelson / Evan Bates
3	Brandon Mroz			Tanith Belbin / Ben Agosto
1st alternate	Johnny Weir	Caroline Zhang	Rena Inoue / John Baldwin	Kimberly Navarro / Brent Bommentre
2nd alternate	Ryan Bradley	Ashley Wagner	Amanda Evora / Mark Ladwig	Madison Hubbell / Keiffer Hubbell
3rd alternate	Stephen Carriere	Mirai Nagasu	Brooke Castile / Ben Okolski	Jane Summersett / Todd Gilles
4th alternate				Trina Pratt / Chris Obzansky

=== Four Continents Championships ===
	Men	Ladies	Pairs	Ice dancing
1	Jeremy Abbott	Alissa Czisny	Keauna McLaughlin / Rockne Brubaker	Meryl Davis / Charlie White
2	Brandon Mroz	Rachael Flatt	Caydee Denney / Jeremy Barrett	Emily Samuelson / Evan Bates
3	Evan Lysacek	Caroline Zhang	Rena Inoue / John Baldwin	Kimberly Navarro / Brent Bommentre
1st alternate	Ryan Bradley	Ashley Wagner	Amanda Evora / Mark Ladwig	Jane Summersett / Todd Gilles
2nd alternate	Johnny Weir	Mirai Nagasu	Brooke Castile / Ben Okolski	Trina Pratt / Chris Obzansky
3rd alternate	Curran Oi	Katrina Hacker	Chloé Katz / Joseph Lynch	Lynn Kriengkrairut / Logan Giulietti-Schmitt

=== World Junior Championships ===
	Men	Ladies	Pairs	Ice dancing
1	Curran Oi	Mirai Nagasu	Brynn Carman / Chris Knierim	Madison Chock / Greg Zuerlein
2	Adam Rippon	Ashley Wagner	Marissa Castelli / Simon Shnapir	Madison Hubbell / Keiffer Hubbell
3	Ross Miner	Caroline Zhang		Maia Shibutani / Alex Shibutani
1st alternate	Armin Mahbanoozadeh	Katrina Hacker	Molly Aaron / Daniyel Cohen	Piper Gilles / Zachary Donohue
2nd alternate	Alexander Johnson	Alexe Gilles	Brittany Chase / Andrew Speroff	Shannon Wingle / Timothy McKernan
3rd alternate	Richard Dornbush	Brittney Rizo	Kloe Bautista / Galvani Hopson	Isabella Cannuscio / Ian Lorello
4th alternate		Angela Maxwell		
