= 2011 Skate America =

- Type: Grand Prix
- Date: October 21 – 23
- Season: 2011–12
- Location: Ontario, California
- Host: U.S. Figure Skating
- Venue: Citizens Business Bank Arena

Champions
- Men's singles: (Czech Republic) Michal Březina
- Ladies' singles: (United States) Alissa Czisny
- Pairs: (Germany) Aliona Savchenko / Robin Szolkowy
- Ice dance: (United States) Meryl Davis / Charlie White
- Previous: 2010 Skate America
- Next: 2012 Skate America
- Next Grand Prix: 2011 Skate Canada International

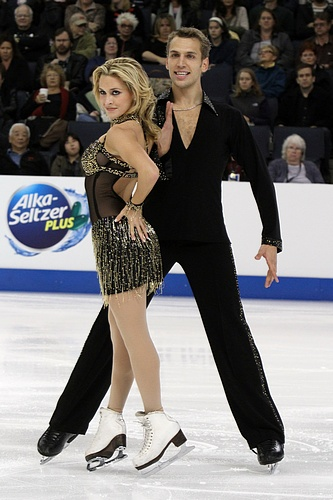

The 2011 Skate America was the first event of six in the 2011–12 ISU Grand Prix of Figure Skating, a senior-level international invitational competition series. It was held at the Citizens Business Bank Arena in Ontario, California on October 21–23. Medals were awarded in the disciplines of men's singles, ladies' singles, pair skating, and ice dancing. Skaters earned points toward qualifying for the 2011–12 Grand Prix Final.

== Eligibility ==
Skaters who reached the age of 14 by July 1, 2011 were eligible to compete on the senior Grand Prix circuit.

In July 2011, minimum score requirements were added to the Grand Prix series and were set at two-thirds of the top scores at the 2011 World Championships. Prior to competing in a Grand Prix event, skaters were required to earn the following:

Discipline	Minimum
Men	168.60
Ladies	117.48
Pairs	130.71
Ice dancing	111.15

== Entries ==
The entries were as follows.

Country	Men	Ladies	Pairs	Ice dancing
Belgium	Kevin van der Perren			
Canada			Kirsten Moore-Towers / Dylan Moscovitch	Alexandra Paul / Mitchell Islam; Kharis Ralph / Asher Hill
Czech Republic	Michal Březina			
China			Zhang Dan / Zhang Hao	
France	Florent Amodio			Nathalie Péchalat / Fabian Bourzat
Georgia		Elene Gedevanishvili		
Germany			Maylin Hausch / Daniel Wende; Aliona Savchenko / Robin Szolkowy	Nelli Zhiganshina / Alexander Gazsi
Italy	Samuel Contesti	Carolina Kostner; Valentina Marchei		
Japan	Takahiko Kozuka; Daisuke Murakami	Haruka Imai		
Kazakhstan	Denis Ten			
Lithuania				Isabella Tobias / Deividas Stagniūnas
Russia		Ksenia Makarova	Vera Bazarova / Yuri Larionov	
Sweden		Joshi Helgesson; Viktoria Helgesson		
United States	Richard Dornbush; Armin Mahbanoozadeh; Douglas Razzano	Alissa Czisny; Joelle Forte; Caroline Zhang	Caydee Denney / John Coughlin; Mary Beth Marley / Rockne Brubaker; Tiffany Vise / Don Baldwin	Isabella Cannuscio / Ian Lorello; Meryl Davis / Charlie White; Madison Hubbell / Zachary Donohue

== Schedule ==
- All times are Pacific Standard Time (GMT -08:00).
- Friday, October 21
  - 7:05 p.m. – Men's short program
  - 8:45 p.m. – Short dance
- Saturday, October 22
  - 11:39 a.m. – Men's free skating
  - 1:34 p.m. – Free dance
  - 7:00 p.m. – Pairs' short program
  - 8:25 p.m. - Ladies' short program
- Sunday, October 23
  - 1:05 p.m. - Pairs' free skating
  - 2:45 p.m. - Ladies' free skating
  - 7:00 p.m. - Exhibitions (Skating Spectacular)

== Results ==
=== Men ===
Michal Březina took an eight-point lead in the short program. He was concerned by the narrowness of the rink: "I was kind of scared if I will fit with the curve because the rink is not so wide. I almost hit the board in practice when I was going for the triple flip." He was third in the free skating but held on to win his first Grand Prix title. Kevin van der Perren placed fourth in the short program and won the free skating to take silver medal, his first GP medal since 2007 Skate Canada International. It was the third Grand Prix silver medal of his career. The 2009 Skate America champion, Takahiko Kozuka, took the bronze medal. This was the first time that no US skater stood on the men's podium at Skate America.

Rank	Name	Nation	Total points	SP		FS	
1	Michal Březina	Czech Republic	216.00	1	79.08	3	136.92
2	Kevin van der Perren	Belgium	212.48	4	70.09	1	142.39
3	Takahiko Kozuka	Japan	212.09	2	70.69	2	141.40
4	Richard Dornbush	United States	202.27	5	70.03	6	132.24
5	Denis Ten	Kazakhstan	197.98	6	67.38	7	130.60
6	Daisuke Murakami	Japan	193.32	3	70.67	9	122.65
7	Douglas Razzano	United States	192.95	9	60.69	5	132.26
8	Samuel Contesti	Italy	190.20	10	55.52	4	134.68
9	Florent Amodio	France	187.60	8	62.46	8	125.14
10	Armin Mahbanoozadeh	United States	179.07	7	64.54	10	114.53

=== Ladies ===
Alissa Czisny won the short program, while Carolina Kostner placed first in the free skating. Czisny edged out Kostner by only 0.13 points for the gold medal. Viktoria Helgesson took the bronze and became the first Swedish skater to win a Grand Prix medal.

Rank	Name	Nation	Total points	SP		FS	
1	Alissa Czisny	United States	177.48	1	64.20	2	113.28
2	Carolina Kostner	Italy	177.35	2	60.23	1	117.12
3	Viktoria Helgesson	Sweden	145.75	5	51.13	5	94.62
4	Haruka Imai	Japan	142.94	4	54.67	9	88.27
5	Ksenia Makarova	Russia	142.67	7	45.95	4	96.72
6	Caroline Zhang	United States	140.70	3	55.05	10	85.65
7	Elene Gedevanishvili	Georgia	140.12	10	42.51	3	97.61
8	Joelle Forte	United States	139.70	6	48.86	7	90.84
9	Valentina Marchei	Italy	135.17	9	43.19	6	91.98
10	Joshi Helgesson	Sweden	133.98	8	45.03	8	88.95

=== Pairs ===
In the short program, Savchenko and Szolkowy attempted the rare throw triple Axel for the first time in their career but experienced a hard fall. They were given credit for completing the revolutions and finished in 5th place, 3.4 points off the lead. They rebounded to place first in the free skating and won their second consecutive Skate America title and third in their career. They added a reverse lasso lift to their free skating but performed only a double twist because they were still working on a new entry to the triple. Dan Zhang and Hao Zhang took silver, their fifth medal at Skate America, after missing the previous season due to hand, shoulder and knee injuries. Kirsten Moore-Towers and Dylan Moscovitch won the bronze, their second medal at the event.

Rank	Name	Nation	Total points	SP		FS	
1	Aliona Savchenko / Robin Szolkowy	Germany	183.98	5	59.45	1	124.53
2	Zhang Dan / Zhang Hao	China	178.66	1	62.85	3	115.81
3	Kirsten Moore-Towers / Dylan Moscovitch	Canada	177.43	4	59.60	2	117.83
4	Caydee Denney / John Coughlin	United States	175.40	2	59.62	4	115.78
5	Vera Bazarova / Yuri Larionov	Russia	173.94	3	59.62	5	114.32
6	Tiffany Vise / Don Baldwin	United States	155.42	7	51.55	6	103.87
7	Mary Beth Marley / Rockne Brubaker	United States	144.80	6	56.16	8	88.64
8	Maylin Hausch / Daniel Wende	Germany	141.54	8	48.94	7	92.60

=== Ice dancing ===
Davis and White repeated as Skate America champions, with Pechalat and Bourzat winning the silver medal, and Tobias and Stagniunas pulling up from fifth to take bronze, their first Grand Prix medal. Bourzat was recovering from bronchitis.

Rank	Name	Nation	Total points	SD		FD	
1	Meryl Davis / Charlie White	United States	178.07	1	70.33	1	107.74
2	Nathalie Péchalat / Fabian Bourzat	France	156.29	2	60.07	2	96.22
3	Isabella Tobias / Deividas Stagniūnas	Lithuania	132.58	5	51.83	4	80.75
4	Nelli Zhiganshina / Alexander Gazsi	Germany	131.61	3	55.66	6	75.95
5	Kharis Ralph / Asher Hill	Canada	131.29	4	52.68	5	78.61
6	Madison Hubbell / Zachary Donohue	United States	131.04	6	49.71	3	81.33
7	Isabella Cannuscio / Ian Lorello	United States	115.22	7	42.05	8	73.17
8	Alexandra Paul / Mitchell Islam	Canada	111.70	8	37.50	7	74.20
