= 2011 U.S. Figure Skating Championships =

Figure skating competition

- Type: National Championship
- Date: January 22 – 30
- Season: 2010–11
- Location: Greensboro, North Carolina
- Venue: Greensboro Coliseum

Champions
- Men's singles: Ryan Bradley
- Ladies' singles: Alissa Czisny
- Pairs: Caitlin Yankowskas / John Coughlin
- Ice dance: Meryl Davis / Charlie White
- Previous: 2010 U.S. Championships
- Next: 2012 U.S. Championships

The 2011 U.S. Figure Skating Championships was held in Greensboro, North Carolina on January 22–30, 2011. Skaters competed in the men's singles, ladies' singles, pair skating, and ice dancing on the senior, junior, and novice levels. The event was part of the selection process for several international events, including the 2011 World Championships.

The event resulted in direct economic impacts of $27.4 million and an additional $24 million in media impacts, with tax revenues of over $2.2 million.

== Senior results ==
=== Men ===
| Rank | Name | Total points | SP | | FS | |
|---|---|---|---|---|---|---|
| 1 | Ryan Bradley | 231.90 | 1 | 80.39 | 4 | 151.51 |
| 2 | Richard Dornbush | 225.56 | 7 | 67.71 | 1 | 157.85 |
| 3 | Ross Miner | 224.35 | 6 | 67.99 | 2 | 156.36 |
| 4 | Jeremy Abbott | 224.16 | 2 | 78.39 | 6 | 145.77 |
| 5 | Adam Rippon | 220.04 | 9 | 66.26 | 3 | 153.78 |
| 6 | Armin Mahbanoozadeh | 215.05 | 8 | 66.77 | 5 | 148.28 |
| 7 | Brandon Mroz | 213.49 | 3 | 71.61 | 9 | 141.88 |
| 8 | Keegan Messing | 213.29 | 4 | 69.79 | 8 | 143.50 |
| 9 | Jason Brown | 208.76 | 11 | 64.32 | 7 | 144.44 |
| 10 | Douglas Razzano | 206.76 | 5 | 69.61 | 10 | 137.15 |
| 11 | Jonathan Cassar | 187.76 | 17 | 55.98 | 11 | 131.78 |
| 12 | Grant Hochstein | 183.37 | 10 | 65.76 | 13 | 117.61 |
| 13 | Scott Dyer | 177.15 | 18 | 55.78 | 12 | 121.37 |
| 14 | Wesley Campbell | 176.69 | 14 | 59.35 | 14 | 117.34 |
| 15 | Jason Wong | 172.63 | 12 | 62.20 | 15 | 110.43 |
| 16 | Alexander Johnson | 165.50 | 16 | 57.30 | 17 | 108.20 |
| 17 | Parker Pennington | 164.68 | 19 | 55.49 | 16 | 109.19 |
| 18 | Andrew Gonzales | 162.52 | 20 | 54.41 | 18 | 108.11 |
| 19 | Christopher Caluza | 157.72 | 15 | 59.28 | 20 | 98.44 |
| 20 | Sean Rabbitt | 155.71 | 21 | 51.42 | 19 | 104.29 |
| 21 | Joshua Farris | 151.73 | 13 | 60.91 | 22 | 90.82 |
| 22 | Lloyd Ting | 140.92 | 22 | 44.50 | 21 | 96.42 |

=== Ladies ===
| Rank | Name | Total points | SP | | FS | |
|---|---|---|---|---|---|---|
| 1 | Alissa Czisny | 191.24 | 2 | 62.50 | 1 | 128.74 |
| 2 | Rachael Flatt | 183.38 | 3 | 62.32 | 2 | 121.06 |
| 3 | Mirai Nagasu | 177.26 | 1 | 63.35 | 3 | 113.91 |
| 4 | Agnes Zawadzki | 173.84 | 4 | 61.54 | 4 | 112.30 |
| 5 | Christina Gao | 167.20 | 5 | 58.43 | 6 | 108.77 |
| 6 | Ashley Wagner | 165.36 | 7 | 54.63 | 5 | 110.73 |
| 7 | Vanessa Lam | 162.91 | 6 | 57.61 | 7 | 105.30 |
| 8 | Yasmin Siraj | 152.75 | 8 | 49.91 | 8 | 102.56 |
| 9 | Joelle Forte | 149.28 | 12 | 47.03 | 9 | 102.25 |
| 10 | Melissa Bulanhagui | 144.53 | 15 | 45.36 | 11 | 99.17 |
| 11 | Kristiene Gong | 143.30 | 17 | 44.12 | 10 | 99.18 |
| 12 | Caroline Zhang | 140.95 | 10 | 48.48 | 12 | 92.47 |
| 13 | Kelsey Traunero | 128.30 | 18 | 42.28 | 13 | 86.02 |
| 14 | Alexe Gilles | 123.75 | 11 | 47.75 | 16 | 76.00 |
| 15 | Kristine Musademba | 123.53 | 13 | 46.94 | 15 | 76.59 |
| 16 | Ellie Kawamura | 121.94 | 16 | 45.19 | 14 | 76.75 |
| 17 | Morgan Bell | 119.57 | 9 | 49.73 | 20 | 69.84 |
| 18 | Danielle Kahle | 117.61 | 14 | 45.87 | 19 | 71.74 |
| 19 | Keli Zhou | 115.59 | 19 | 41.38 | 17 | 74.21 |
| 20 | Katy Jo West | 112.81 | 21 | 40.07 | 18 | 72.74 |
| 21 | Raina Narita | 94.54 | 22 | 33.75 | 21 | 60.79 |
| 22 | Tatyana Khazova | 85.49 | 23 | 26.58 | 22 | 58.91 |
| WD | Felicia Zhang | | 20 | 41.23 | | |

=== Pairs ===
| Rank | Name | Total points | SP | | FS | |
|---|---|---|---|---|---|---|
| 1 | Caitlin Yankowskas / John Coughlin | 188.45 | 1 | 64.30 | 1 | 124.15 |
| 2 | Amanda Evora / Mark Ladwig | 185.22 | 2 | 62.87 | 2 | 122.35 |
| 3 | Caydee Denney / Jeremy Barrett | 175.49 | 4 | 57.79 | 3 | 117.70 |
| 4 | Mary Beth Marley / Rockne Brubaker | 163.55 | 3 | 58.10 | 4 | 105.45 |
| 5 | Marissa Castelli / Simon Shnapir | 151.92 | 6 | 51.48 | 5 | 100.44 |
| 6 | Tiffany Vise / Don Baldwin | 151.26 | 5 | 54.29 | 7 | 96.97 |
| 7 | Lindsay Davis / Themistocles Leftheris | 148.25 | 7 | 51.07 | 6 | 97.18 |
| 8 | Gretchen Donlan / Andrew Speroff | 145.25 | 9 | 48.62 | 8 | 96.63 |
| 9 | Chloé Katz / Joseph Lynch | 140.00 | 12 | 46.38 | 9 | 93.62 |
| 10 | Becky Bereswill / Trevor Young | 137.71 | 8 | 48.77 | 12 | 88.94 |
| 11 | Molly Aaron / Daniyel Cohen | 136.83 | 10 | 47.24 | 10 | 89.59 |
| 12 | Erika Smith / Nathan Bartholomay | 132.59 | 13 | 43.60 | 11 | 88.99 |
| 13 | Lisa Moore / Justin Gaumond | 127.58 | 11 | 46.44 | 13 | 81.14 |
| WD | Alexa Scimeca / Ivan Dimitrov | | | | | |

=== Ice dancing ===
| Rank | Name | Total points | SD | | FD | |
|---|---|---|---|---|---|---|
| 1 | Meryl Davis / Charlie White | 185.48 | 1 | 76.04 | 1 | 109.44 |
| 2 | Maia Shibutani / Alex Shibutani | 173.18 | 2 | 70.47 | 2 | 102.71 |
| 3 | Madison Chock / Greg Zuerlein | 154.62 | 3 | 61.74 | 3 | 92.88 |
| 4 | Madison Hubbell / Keiffer Hubbell | 141.70 | 5 | 57.91 | 4 | 83.79 |
| 5 | Lynn Kriengkrairut / Logan Giulietti-Schmitt | 138.42 | 4 | 58.59 | 6 | 79.83 |
| 6 | Isabella Cannuscio / Ian Lorello | 136.55 | 7 | 54.43 | 5 | 82.12 |
| 7 | Shannon Wingle / Timothy McKernan | 130.20 | 6 | 55.07 | 8 | 75.13 |
| 8 | Rachel Tibbetts / Collin Brubaker | 118.25 | 10 | 41.86 | 7 | 76.39 |
| 9 | Meredith Zuber / Kyle Herring | 118.06 | 9 | 44.42 | 9 | 73.64 |
| 10 | Ginna Hoptman / Pavel Filchenkov | 117.53 | 8 | 48.37 | 10 | 69.16 |
| 11 | Alissandra Aronow / Zachary Donohue | 105.36 | 11 | 40.84 | 11 | 64.52 |
| 12 | Kristen Nardozzi / Robert Cuthbertson | 92.99 | 12 | 38.53 | 13 | 54.46 |
| 13 | Katharine Zeigler / Baxter Burbank | 90.00 | 15 | 32.29 | 12 | 57.71 |
| 14 | Alison Carey / Ryan Van Natten | 83.68 | 13 | 34.35 | 14 | 49.33 |
| 15 | Katherine Pilgrim / Alexander Lorello | 80.39 | 14 | 32.79 | 15 | 47.60 |

== Junior results ==
=== Men ===
| Rank | Name | Total points | SP | | FS | |
|---|---|---|---|---|---|---|
| 1 | Max Aaron | 188.67 | 2 | 62.95 | 1 | 125.72 |
| 2 | Alexander Zahradnicek | 182.85 | 1 | 63.81 | 2 | 119.04 |
| 3 | Alexander Aiken | 179.94 | 3 | 61.78 | 3 | 118.16 |
| 4 | Steven Evans | 173.08 | 4 | 61.66 | 5 | 111.42 |
| 5 | Emmanuel Savary | 170.56 | 5 | 53.57 | 4 | 116.99 |
| 6 | Philip Warren | 160.52 | 10 | 49.65 | 6 | 110.87 |
| 7 | David Wang | 152.54 | 6 | 53.34 | 8 | 99.20 |
| 8 | Harrison Choate | 150.06 | 9 | 49.69 | 7 | 100.37 |
| 9 | Shotaro Omori | 136.80 | 7 | 52.19 | 11 | 84.61 |
| 10 | Timothy Koleto | 136.05 | 8 | 49.97 | 9 | 86.08 |
| 11 | Ryan Hartley | 129.81 | 12 | 44.36 | 10 | 85.45 |
| 12 | Will Michael | 128.12 | 13 | 44.27 | 12 | 83.85 |
| 13 | TJ Yang | 109.65 | 11 | 47.83 | 13 | 61.82 |

=== Ladies ===
| Rank | Name | Total points | SP | | FS | |
|---|---|---|---|---|---|---|
| 1 | Courtney Hicks | 173.22 | 1 | 60.84 | 1 | 112.38 |
| 2 | Lauren Dinh | 153.99 | 3 | 52.51 | 2 | 101.48 |
| 3 | Katarina Kulgeyko | 146.62 | 2 | 53.08 | 3 | 93.54 |
| 4 | McKinzie Daniels | 138.59 | 5 | 49.54 | 5 | 89.05 |
| 5 | Mary Beth Marley | 137.82 | 4 | 50.55 | 6 | 87.27 |
| 6 | Ashley Cain | 137.44 | 7 | 48.35 | 4 | 89.09 |
| 7 | Polina Edmunds | 132.91 | 6 | 48.78 | 8 | 84.13 |
| 8 | Haley Dunne | 132.57 | 9 | 46.10 | 7 | 86.47 |
| 9 | Nina Jiang | 128.55 | 8 | 46.74 | 9 | 81.81 |
| 10 | Allison Timlen | 115.64 | 10 | 45.20 | 10 | 70.44 |
| 11 | Elise Eng | 103.02 | 11 | 43.24 | 11 | 59.78 |
| 12 | Nicole Rajic | 90.78 | 12 | 35.63 | 12 | 55.15 |

=== Pairs ===
| Rank | Name | Total points | SP | | FS | |
|---|---|---|---|---|---|---|
| 1 | Ashley Cain / Joshua Reagan | 142.28 | 1 | 47.63 | 1 | 94.65 |
| 2 | Andrea Poapst / Christopher Knierim | 136.46 | 6 | 44.34 | 2 | 92.12 |
| 3 | Cassie Andrews / Timothy LeDuc | 129.84 | 2 | 47.40 | 5 | 82.44 |
| 4 | Brynn Carman / AJ Reiss | 129.02 | 4 | 45.26 | 3 | 83.76 |
| 5 | Mandy Garza / Brandon Frazier | 128.29 | 5 | 44.84 | 4 | 83.45 |
| 6 | Haven Denney / Daniel Raad | 125.17 | 8 | 42.85 | 6 | 82.32 |
| 7 | Kylie Duarte / Colin Grafton | 122.94 | 3 | 45.35 | 7 | 77.59 |
| 8 | Jessica Calalang / Zack Sidhu | 113.32 | 7 | 43.63 | 8 | 69.69 |
| 9 | Morgan Sowa / David Leenen | 110.13 | 9 | 42.16 | 9 | 67.97 |
| 10 | Kloe Chanel Bautista / Tyler Harris | 104.98 | 10 | 38.62 | 10 | 66.36 |
| 11 | Olivia Oltmanns / Joshua Santillan | 103.28 | 11 | 37.87 | 11 | 65.41 |
| 12 | Christina Guterres / Justin Schumann | 99.67 | 12 | 35.94 | 12 | 63.73 |

=== Ice dancing ===
| Rank | Name | Total points | SD | | FD | |
|---|---|---|---|---|---|---|
| 1 | Charlotte Lichtman / Dean Copely | 132.28 | 2 | 55.23 | 1 | 77.05 |
| 2 | Lauri Bonacorsi / Travis Mager | 127.39 | 3 | 52.39 | 2 | 75.00 |
| 3 | Anastasia Cannuscio / Colin McManus | 122.86 | 4 | 52.25 | 4 | 70.61 |
| 4 | Anastasia Olson / Jordan Cowan | 121.12 | 6 | 48.20 | 3 | 72.92 |
| 5 | Alexandra Aldridge / Daniel Eaton | 120.64 | 5 | 51.91 | 5 | 68.73 |
| 6 | Joylyn Yang / Jean-Luc Baker | 118.99 | 1 | 56.09 | 8 | 62.90 |
| 7 | Danielle Gamelin / Alexander Gamelin | 108.67 | 8 | 43.95 | 6 | 64.72 |
| 8 | Madeline Heritage / Nathaniel Fast | 103.24 | 7 | 44.26 | 9 | 58.98 |
| 9 | Lorraine McNamara / Quinn Carpenter | 102.99 | 9 | 39.80 | 7 | 63.19 |
| 10 | Heather Buckner / Nicholas Taylor | 93.96 | 10 | 39.51 | 10 | 54.45 |
| 11 | Carina Glastris / Kevin Allison | 84.02 | 12 | 36.21 | 12 | 47.81 |
| 12 | Natalie Wojton / Michael Soyfer | 82.95 | 11 | 36.85 | 13 | 46.10 |
| 13 | Jenna Dzierzanowski / Vinny Dispenza | 75.67 | 13 | 25.36 | 11 | 50.31 |

== International team selections ==
=== World Championships ===
| | Men | Ladies | Pairs | Ice dancing |
|---|---|---|---|---|
| 1 | Ryan Bradley | Alissa Czisny | Amanda Evora / Mark Ladwig | Madison Chock / Greg Zuerlein |
| 2 | Richard Dornbush | Rachael Flatt | Caitlin Yankowskas / John Coughlin | Meryl Davis / Charlie White |
| 3 | Ross Miner | | | Maia Shibutani / Alex Shibutani |
| 1st alternate | Jeremy Abbott | Mirai Nagasu | Caydee Denney / Jeremy Barrett | Madison Hubbell / Keiffer Hubbell |
| 2nd alternate | Adam Rippon | Agnes Zawadzki | Mary Beth Marley / Rockne Brubaker | Lynn Kriengkrairut / Logan Giulietti-Schmitt |
| 3rd alternate | Armin Mahbanoozadeh | Christina Gao | Marissa Castelli / Simon Shnapir | Isabella Cannuscio / Ian Lorello |

=== Four Continents Championships ===
| | Men | Ladies | Pairs | Ice dancing |
|---|---|---|---|---|
| 1 | Jeremy Abbott | Alissa Czisny | Amanda Evora / Mark Ladwig | Madison Chock / Greg Zuerlein |
| 2 | Armin Mahbanoozadeh | Rachael Flatt | Mary Beth Marley / Rockne Brubaker | Meryl Davis / Charlie White |
| 3 | Adam Rippon | Mirai Nagasu | Caitlin Yankowskas / John Coughlin | Maia Shibutani / Alex Shibutani |
| 1st alternate | Brandon Mroz | Ashley Wagner | Marissa Castelli / Simon Shnapir | Madison Hubbell / Keiffer Hubbell |
| 2nd alternate | Douglas Razzano | Agnes Zawadzki | Tiffany Vise / Don Baldwin | Lynn Kriengkrairut / Logan Giulietti-Schmitt |
| 3rd alternate | Jonathan Cassar | Christina Gao | | Isabella Cannuscio / Ian Lorello |

=== World Junior Championships ===
| | Men | Ladies | Pairs | Ice dancing |
|---|---|---|---|---|
| 1 | Max Aaron | Christina Gao | Ashley Cain / Joshua Reagan | Lauri Bonacorsi / Travis Mager |
| 2 | Jason Brown | Courtney Hicks | Cassie Andrews / Timothy LeDuc | Anastasia Cannuscio / Colin McManus |
| 3 | Keegan Messing | Agnes Zawadzki | | Charlotte Lichtman / Dean Copely |
| 1st alternate | Alexander Zahradnicek | Vanessa Lam | Kylie Duarte / Colin Grafton | Anastasia Olson / Jordan Cowan |
| 2nd alternate | Steven Evans | Yasmin Siraj | Brynn Carman / A.J. Reiss | Alexandra Aldridge / Daniel Eaton |
| 3rd alternate | Philip Warren | Kristiene Gong | Mandy Garza / Brandon Frazier | Joylyn Yang / Jean-Luc Baker |
