= Rockne Brubaker =

American pair skater (born 1986)

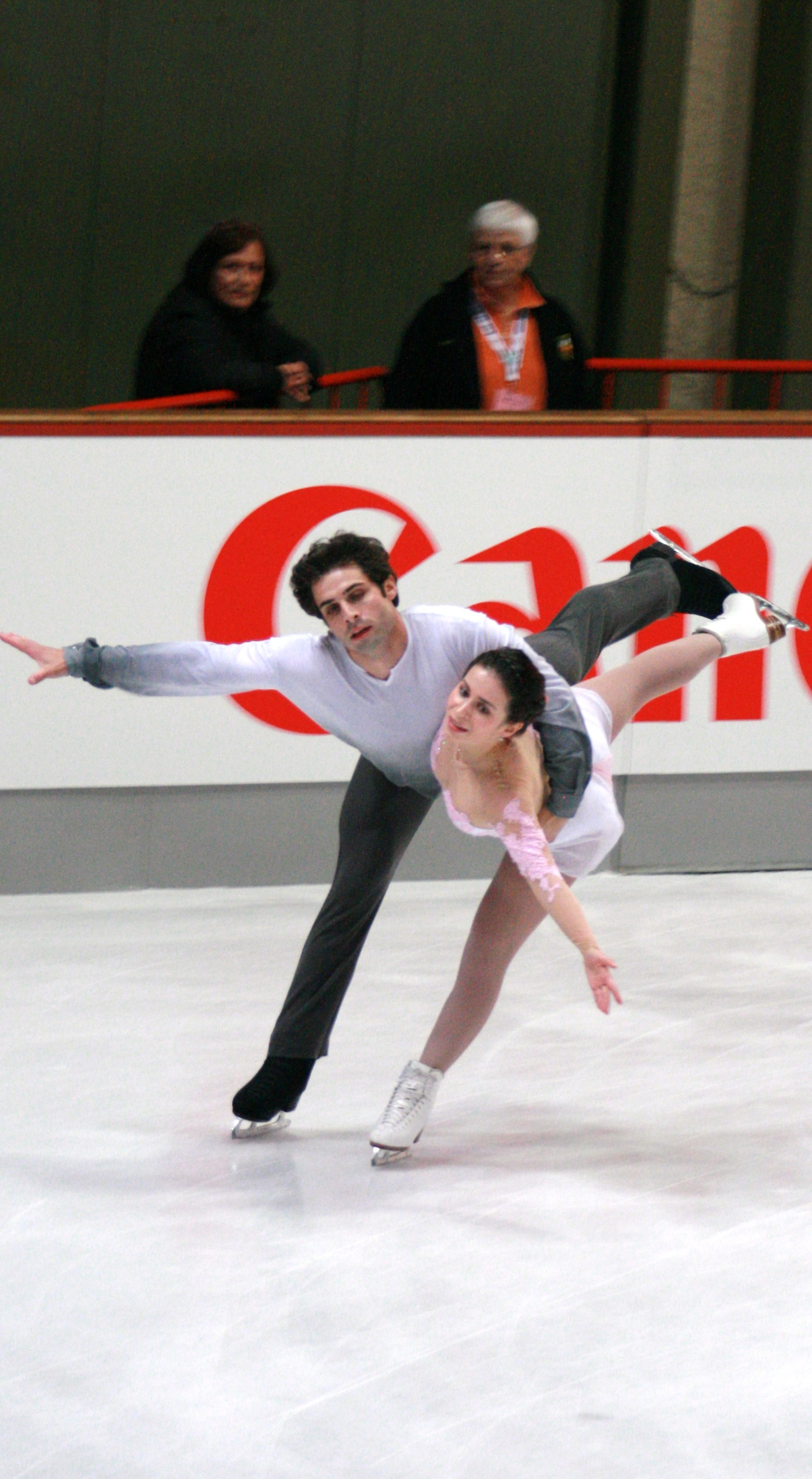
- Davis/Brubaker in 2013.

Personal information
- Full name: Rockne Lee Brubaker II
- Born: June 21, 1986 (age 40) St. Louis, Missouri
- Home town: Algonquin, Illinois
- Height: 5 ft 9 in (1.75 m)

Figure skating career
- Country: United States
- Began skating: 1991
- Retired: 2014
Medal record
Representing United States
Figure skating: Pairs
Four Continents Championships
Bronze medal – third place	2012 Colorado Springs	Pairs
Silver medal – second place	2010 Jeonju	Pairs
World Junior Championships
Gold medal – first place	2007 Oberstdorf	Pairs
Junior Grand Prix Final
Gold medal – first place	2006-07 Sofia	Pairs

Rockne Lee Brubaker, II (born June 21, 1986) is an American former competitive pair skater. With Keauna McLaughlin, he is the 2010 Four Continents silver medalist, the 2007 World Junior champion, and a two-time (2008–2009) U.S. national champion. With Mary Beth Marley, he is the 2012 Four Continents bronze medalist and 2012 U.S. silver medalist.

== Personal life ==
Rockne Brubaker Jr was born in St. Louis, Missouri. His younger brother Collin Brubaker is a competitive ice dancer. He was named after his father, Rockne Brubaker Sr., who had been named after Knute Rockne.

Brubaker graduated from Harry D. Jacobs High School in Algonquin, Illinois. He is a student at the University of Colorado at Colorado Springs majoring in business administration and sports marketing.

Brubaker became engaged to Italian pair skater Stefania Berton on February 2, 2013. The couple married on June 5, 2015, in Wisconsin.

== Career ==
=== Early years ===
Rockne Brubaker began skating at the age of five or six. He originally competed as a single skater, reaching the level of novice. He competed as a pair skater at the same time and eventually gave up singles to focus on pairs around age 12. At 17, he left Chicago and moved to Colorado Springs to train with top pairs coach Dalilah Sappenfield.

With partner Stephanie Freitag, he placed 5th at the novice level at the 2001–2002 season Midwestern Sectional Championships.

In September 2003, Brubaker began skating with Mariel Miller, with whom he competed on the junior level. They won bronze medals at the 2004–05 ISU Junior Grand Prix Final and the 2005–06 ISU Junior Grand Prix Final. They won the junior title at the 2005 U.S. Championships. While originally intending to compete at the senior level at the 2006 U.S. Championships, Miller & Brubaker announced their split in December 2005 due to a lack of height difference that could lead to injury. They were coached by Dalilah Sappenfield and Tom Zakrajsek.

=== Partnership with McLaughlin ===
Sappenfield teamed up Brubaker with Keauna McLaughlin in May 2006. They were coached by Sappenfield and Lei Ina McLaughlin in Colorado Springs. The pair went undefeated in their first competitive season together (2006–07). In that season, McLaughlin and Brubaker competed on the 2006–07 ISU Junior Grand Prix circuit and won both their events and the Junior Grand Prix Final. They went on to win the junior title at both the 2007 U.S. Championships and the 2007 World Junior Championships. McLaughlin and Brubaker were the fourth American pair team in history to win the World Junior title. Because of the age difference between McLaughlin and Brubaker, this was their only junior-age-eligible season.

McLaughlin and Brubaker began the 2007–2008 season on the Grand Prix circuit at the 2007 Cup of China, where they won the silver medal. They won a second silver medal at the 2007 NHK Trophy. Their success at these two competitions qualified them for the 2007–08 Grand Prix Final, but they withdrew after the short program due to an injury to Brubaker.

Later that season, they competed at the 2008 U.S. Championships and won the senior national title, becoming the first U.S. pairs team in 51 years to win consecutive junior and senior national titles. Despite winning the U.S. title, McLaughlin and Brubaker were not assigned to the World Championship or World Junior Championship team due to ISU age restrictions. McLaughlin was too young for senior ISU championships and Brubaker was too old for the World Junior Championships. McLaughlin and Brubaker's win, combined with the wins of Jessica Rose Paetsch & Jon Nuss on the junior level, and Brynn Carman & Christopher Knierim on the novice level, gave their coach Dalilah Sappenfield a sweep of national pair champions for 2008, an accomplishment which led to Sappenfield being named Coach of the Year.

McLaughlin and Brubaker began the 2008–2009 season at the 2008 Skate America, where they won the silver medal. A week later they competed at the 2008 Skate Canada International, where they won the bronze medal. At the 2009 U.S. Championships, McLaughlin and Brubaker successfully defended their national title, which resulted in them being selected to compete at the 2009 Four Continents and the 2009 Worlds. They placed 5th at Four Continents and 11th at the World Championships.

In April 2009, Brubaker had hernia surgery to repair muscle tears in his lower abdomen.

In May 2009, McLaughlin and Brubaker changed coaches to John Nicks and relocated to California.

McLaughlin and Brubaker began the 2009–2010 season at the 2009 Cup of Russia, where they won the bronze medal. They continued their season at the 2009 Skate America, where they placed 4th. As the top American pair team on the international circuit, McLaughlin and Brubaker entered the 2010 U.S. Championships as the favorites to win their third consecutive national title and secure one of the two pair skating berths on the U.S. Olympic team. Despite several days of strong practices, they delivered an uncharacteristically rough short program, including falls on a triple salchow and a freak fall on a death spiral, leaving them in 7th place. The pair was able to move up to 5th place after the long program but it was not enough to win a place on the Olympic team.

Determined to rebound from their national result, McLaughlin and Brubaker competed at the 2010 Four Continents less than ten days later. There, they recorded a personal best score in the short program and ultimately won the silver medal.

In June 2010, McLaughlin and Brubaker announced the end of their partnership.

=== Partnership with Marley ===
Brubaker was uncertain whether to continue skating competitively but his coach arranged some tryouts. In August, he had a two-day tryout with Mary Beth Marley and he was impressed enough to cancel his other tryouts, although she had no pairs experience. Marley relocated to Aliso Viejo, California, and they began training together in earnest in September with coach John Nicks. Their first international competition was the Toruń Cup in Toruń, Poland, where they earned the minimum technical scores required to compete at an ISU Championship. They placed fourth at the 2011 U.S. Nationals and were named as alternates for Four Continents. They were assigned to the event after an injury led Caydee Denney and Jeremy Barrett to withdraw. Jenni Meno and Todd Sand became their main coaches for the 2011–12 season and Nicks also continued to work with the pair.

In the 2012–13 season, Marley and Brubaker were assigned to 2012 Skate Canada International and 2012 NHK Trophy, however, on August 14, 2012, the pair announced the end of their partnership. Brubaker said he planned to continue in competitive figure skating. In late August, he had a tryout with Amanda Evora, which did not result in a partnership because neither of them could move. Brubaker said he would not compete in the 2012–2013 season. In January 2013, he confirmed he had moved back to Chicago and was continuing his partner search.

=== Later career ===
On February 19, 2013, Brubaker announced his partnership with Lindsay Davis. They competed together for one season. In March 2014, he became the skating director at the Fox Valley Ice Arena in Illinois.

== Programs ==
=== With Davis ===
Season	Short program	Free skating
2013–2014	Petite Fleur by Sidney Bechet; Skokiaan by Louis Armstrong	The Umbrellas of Cherbourg by Michel Legrand

=== With Marley ===
Season	Short program	Free skating
2011–2012	Singin' in the Rain	Piano Concerto No. 2 in C Minor by Sergei Rachmaninoff
2010–2011	Elizabeth: The Golden Age by Craig Armstrong, A. R. Rahman	The Addams Family by Marc Shaiman

=== With McLaughlin ===
Season	Short program	Free skating	Exhibition
2009–2010	Unchained Melody by Alex North, Hy Zaret	Slumdog Millionaire by A. R. Rahman	Tell Him by Colbie Caillat
2008–2009	Malagueña by Ernesto Lecuona choreo. by Lea Ann Miller	West Side Story by Leonard Bernstein, Stephen Sondheim choreo. by Lea Ann Miller	Play That Funky Music by Wild Cherry; Something by The Beatles
2007–2008	Moonlight Sonata by Ludwig van Beethoven choreo. by Dalilah Sappenfield	Romeo and Juliet by Sergei Prokofiev; Romeo and Juliet by Nino Rota choreo. by Dalilah Sappenfield	Play That Funky Music by Wild Cherry
2006–2007	Somewhere in Time by John Barry choreo. by Dalilah Sappenfield	Romeo and Juliet by Sergei Prokofiev; Romeo and Juliet by Nino Rota choreo. by Dalilah Sappenfield	Play That Funky Music by Wild Cherry

=== With Miller ===
Season	Short program	Free skating	Exhibition
2005–2006	Tosca by Giacomo Puccini	The Addams Family by Marc Shaiman	
2004–2005	Romeo and Juliet	Pearl Harbor by Hans Zimmer	Grease

== Competitive highlights ==
=== Pair skating with Davis ===
International
Event	13–14
GP Rostelecom Cup	7th
GP Skate Canada International	6th
Nebelhorn Trophy	5th
National
U.S. Championships	9th

=== Pair skating with Marley ===
International
Event	10–11	11–12
World Championships		10th
Four Continents Champ.	8th	3rd
GP Skate America		7th
Cup of Nice		3rd
Toruń Cup	1st	
National
U.S. Championships	4th	2nd

=== Pair skating with McLaughlin ===
International
Event	06–07	07–08	08–09	09–10
World Champ.			11th	
Four Continents Champ.			5th	2nd
GP Cup of China		2nd		
GP Cup of Russia				3rd
GP NHK Trophy		2nd		
GP Skate America			2nd	4th
GP Skate Canada			3rd	
International: Junior
World Junior Champ.	1st			
JGP Final	1st			
JGP Hungary	1st			
JGP Taiwan	1st			
National
U.S. Championships	1st J.	1st	1st	5th
J. = Junior level; WD = Withdrew

=== Pair skating with Miller ===
International
Event	03–04	04–05	05–06
World Junior Champ.		4th	
JGP Final		3rd	3rd
JGP Bulgaria			1st
JGP France		1st	
JGP Romania		2nd	
JGP Slovakia			1st
Triglav Trophy	1st J.		
National
U.S. Championships	2nd N.	1st J.	
Levels: N. = Novice; J. = Junior
