= Lorello =

Lorello is an Italian surname. Notable people with the surname include:

- Ian Lorello (born 1990), American ice dancer
- Riccardo Lorello (born 2002), Italian speed skater
