= Rachael Flatt =

American figure skater

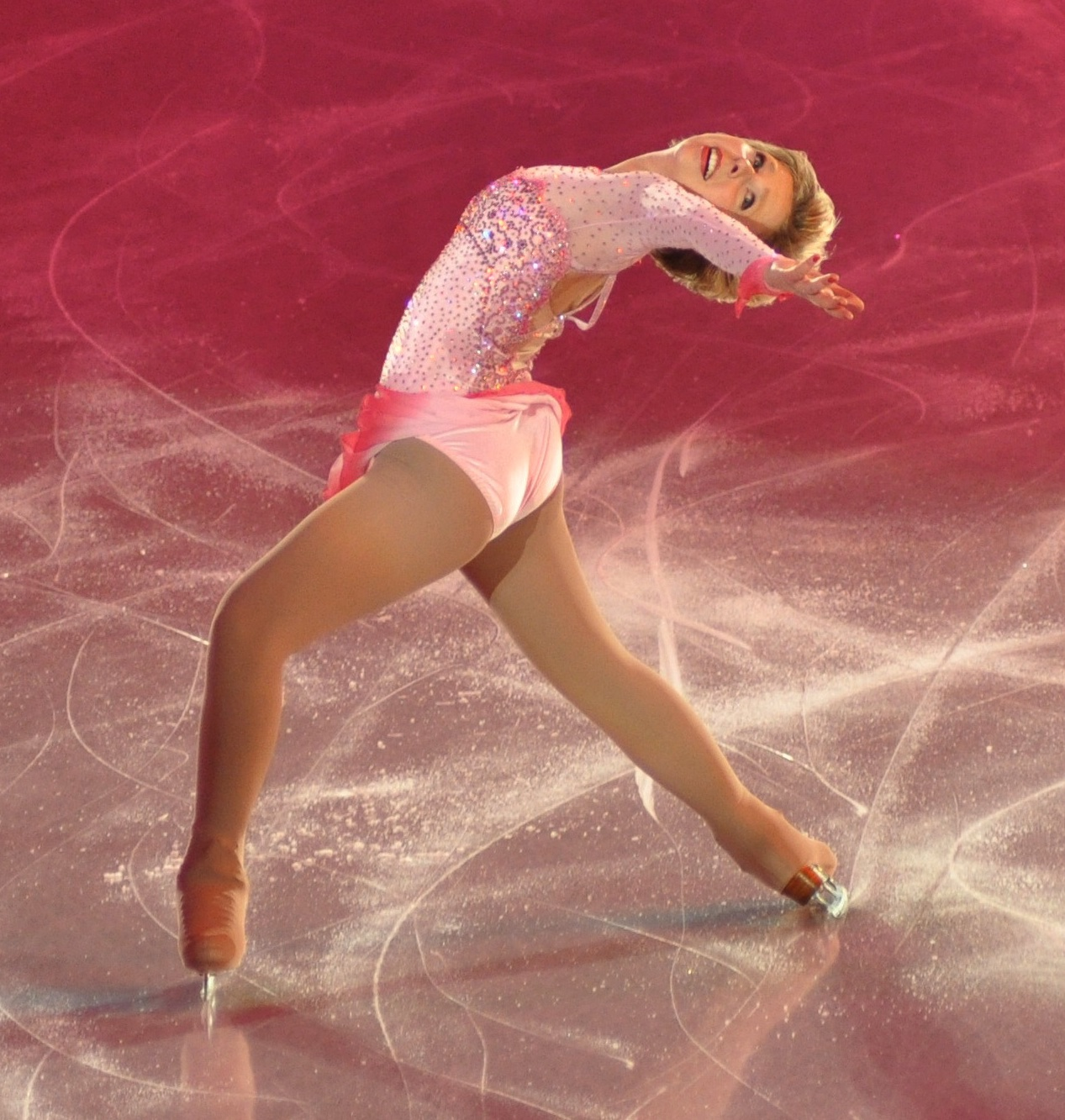
- Flatt at the 2011 U.S. Championships gala

Personal information
- Full name: Rachael Elizabeth Flatt
- Born: July 21, 1992 (age 34) Del Mar, California, U.S.
- Height: 5 ft 2 in (1.58 m)

Figure skating career
- Country: United States
- Coach: Justin Dillon, Lynn Smith
- Skating club: St. Moritz FSC
- Began skating: 1996
- Retired: 2014
Medal record
Figure skating
Representing the United States
World Team Trophy
| Gold medal – first place | 2009 Tokyo | Team |
World Junior Championships
| Gold medal – first place | 2008 Sofia | Ladies' singles |
Junior Grand Prix Final
| Silver medal – second place | 2007–08 Gdansk | Ladies' singles |

Rachael Elizabeth Flatt (born July 21, 1992) is an American former competitive figure skater. She is the 2008 World Junior champion, a winner of four silver medals on the Grand Prix series, and the 2010 U.S. national champion.

She was nominated to represent the United States at the 2010 Winter Olympics and placed 7th. She is a 2015 graduate of Stanford University.

== Personal life ==
Flatt was born on July 21, 1992, in Del Mar, California. She is an only child. Her father is a biochemical engineer and her mother a molecular biologist. Her grandfather competed on the national level in fencing.

Flatt is a 2010 graduate of Cheyenne Mountain High School in Colorado Springs, Colorado. In spring 2015, she received a bachelor's degree from Stanford University, where she majored in biology with a minor in psychology. She was the junior class president and a member of the Alpha Phi sorority. In her senior year, she became a research assistant in the laboratory of Professor C. Barr Taylor. As of September 2018, she is focusing on eating disorders as a Ph.D. student under Dr. Cynthia Bulik at the University of North Carolina.

In June 2019, Flatt got engaged to travel writer Eric Iwashita. The pair married on August 1, 2020, in Colorado Springs.

In June 2026, Flatt announced the birth of her first child, a daughter named Riley.

== Career ==
Flatt began skating at age four. In addition to her singles career, Flatt also competed as a pair skater from 2001 to 2004 with partner Andrew Speroff. The pair won the silver medal at Nationals on the juvenile level in 2003 and the intermediate title in 2004.

Competing in ladies' singles, Flatt won the US Novice national title in 2005 at age 12. While, under other circumstances, this would have earned her an event on the Junior Grand Prix for the following season, Flatt was three weeks too young to compete internationally as a junior. She was invited to compete at the 2005 Triglav Trophy event in Slovenia, where she won the Novice competition. Later in 2005, Flatt was invited to compete at the 2005 North American Challenge competition as a junior lady, where she won the bronze medal. Flatt won the silver medal at US Nationals at the junior level in 2006.

=== 2006–2007 season ===
Flatt missed the 2006–2007 ISU Junior Grand Prix season due to injury, but qualified through the regional and sectional qualifying competitions, winning both, and made her senior debut at the 2007 U.S. Championships, where she placed 5th and earned a bye to the 2008 U.S. Championships. Flatt made her international debut as a junior in March 2007 at the International Challenge Cup, which she won. Flatt was often referred to as "Rachael the Rock" and was often called " The Consistency Queen" because of her ability to compete cleanly, landing up to seven triples in a freeskate, including her triple-triple combinations.

=== 2007–2008 season ===
Flatt competed on the Junior Grand Prix for the first time in the 2007–2008 season, winning the gold medal at her first JGP in Vienna, Austria, and a silver medal at her second JGP in Chemnitz, Germany. She qualified for the Junior Grand Prix Final, placing third in the short program, first in the free skate, and winning the silver medal. At the 2008 U.S. Championships in St Paul, Minnesota, she won the silver medal on the senior level after winning the free skate.

Too young to be eligible for the senior World Championships, Flatt was placed on the team to the 2008 World Junior Championships. After placing third in the short program, she won the free skate and won the title overall. The American ladies – Flatt, Zhang and Nagasu – swept the podium.

=== 2008–2009 season ===
Flatt began her season at the 2008 Skate America, where she placed fourth overall. She also competed at 2008 Cup of Russia, winning the silver medal behind Carolina Kostner of Italy. Flatt won the silver medal at the 2009 U.S. Championships. She placed 5th at the 2009 World Championships after Mao Asada.

=== 2009–2010 season ===
Flatt won silver at the 2009 Skate America and finished 4th at 2009 Cup of China. She placed ahead of later Olympic champion Yuna Kim in the long program at Skate America. She won gold at the 2010 U.S. Championships and was named in the U.S. Olympic team. At the 2010 Winter Olympics in Vancouver, Flatt placed 7th with 182.49 points. She finished ninth at the 2010 World Championships.

=== 2010–2011 season ===
Flatt won a silver medal at the 2011 U.S. Championships. She was sent to the 2011 World Championships. A week before the event, Flatt was diagnosed with a stress fracture in her right tibia (her landing leg). Nevertheless, her coach Tom Zakrajsek stated that he felt that Flatt could complete her elements despite the stress fracture and did not request that the alternate, Mirai Nagasu, compete in her place. During the competition, Flatt had errors on one of her jumps in the short program and three in the free skate and finished in 12th place. In May 2011, Flatt confirmed that she was leaving Colorado Springs in order to study chemical engineering at Stanford University and would look for a new coach in the Bay Area. In June 2011, U.S. Figure Skating reprimanded and fined Flatt for not informing them of her injury in advance.

=== 2011–2012 season ===
On August 19, 2011, Flatt announced that she would be working with Justin Dillon and Lynn Smith in Oakland, California. She also spent some time training with Sergei Ponomarenko in San Jose and Charlie Tickner in Redwood City. Flatt was 10th at 2011 Skate Canada International. Before leaving for Rostelecom Cup, she sprained ligaments around her ankle joint and finished 9th at the event. Flatt said she would spend her holiday break in Colorado Springs working with Tom Zakrajsek and Becky Calvin. She competed at the 2012 U.S. Championships and placed sixth.

=== 2012–2013 season ===
Flatt finished ninth at the 2012 Skate America. On October 30, 2012, Flatt said she would miss the rest of the season due to the recurrence of an injury in her right lower leg and ankle.

=== 2013–2014 season ===
Flatt completed the first step in qualifying for nationals by winning the 2014 Central Pacific Regionals. She placed first in both the short and the long with an overall score of 139.48. This was her first step in attempting to make her second Olympic team. In January 2014, she placed 18th at the U.S. Championships and announced her retirement from competitive skating.

== Endorsements and public life ==
Flatt signed an endorsement deal with AT&T, the Colorado Potato Administrative Committee (CPAC), and has also served as a spokesperson for Reading Is Fundamental, as well as the US Anti-Doping Agency. In the lead-up to the 2010 Olympics, she was endorsed by MAC Cosmetics.

In 2016, she was inducted into the Colorado Springs Sports Hall Of Fame.

== Programs ==
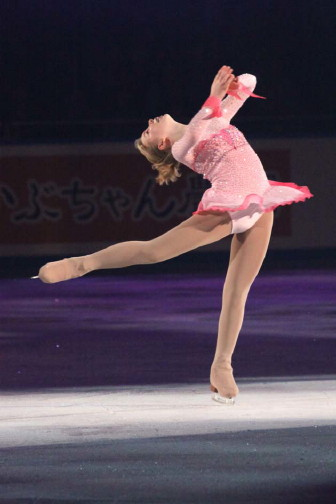
Flatt performs her One Day I'll Fly Away exhibition at the 2009 World Team Trophy.

| Season | Short program | Free skating | Exhibition |
|---|---|---|---|
| 2013–2014 | "Adagio for Strings" by Samuel Barber | "Piano Concerto No. 2" by Sergei Rachmaninoff | |
| 2012–2013 | "Contrabajissimo" by Astor Piazzolla | "The Firebird" by Igor Stravinsky | |
| 2011–2012 | "East of Eden" (1981 TV mini-series) by Lee Holdridge performed by the London Symphony Orchestra | "The Firebird" by Igor Stravinsky | |
| 2010–2011 | "East of Eden" (1981 TV mini-series) by Lee Holdridge performed by the London Symphony Orchestra; "Summertime" by George Gershwin; "Oh, but on the Third Day (Happy Feet Blues)" by Wynton Marsalis, Marcus Roberts | "Slaughter on Tenth Avenue" by Richard Rodgers and Earl Wild | "I Want to Hold Your Hand" performed by Chris Colfer (Glee) |
| 2009–2010 | "Sing, Sing, Sing)" (part 2) (from the musical Fosse) | "Rhapsody on a Theme of Paganini" by Sergei Rachmaninoff | "Fame"; "One Night Only" (from Dreamgirls); "One Day I'll Fly Away" (from Moulin Rouge!) |
| 2008–2009 | "Moon River (from Breakfast at Tiffany's) by Henry Mancini; "Piano Concerto No. 2 by Sergei Rachmaninoff | "Romantic Rhapsody" by André Mathieu; "Dialogue du vent et de la mer" (from La mer) by Claude Debussy; "En Bateau" (from Petite Suite) by Claude Debussy arranged by H. Busser; "Dialogue du vent et de la mer" | "One Day I'll Fly Away" (from Moulin Rouge!); "Simple Gifts by Alison Krauss and Yo-Yo Ma; "Respect" by Aretha Franklin |
| 2007–2008 | "It Ain't Necessarily So" by George Gershwin | "Romantic Rhapsody" by André Mathieu | "Respect" by Aretha Franklin; "Black Horse and the Cherry Tree" by KT Tunstall |
| 2006–2007 | Scherzo: Allegro Molto (from Trio No. 1 in B Major, Opus 8) by Johannes Brahms | "An American in Paris" by George Gershwin | "Black Horse and the Cherry Tree" by KT Tunstall |
| 2005–2006 | "Nessun dorma" by Giacomo Puccini | Carmen" by Georges Bizet | |
| 2004–2005 | "Summertime" by George Gershwin | "The Firebird" by Igor Stravinsky | "Summertime" by George Gershwin |

== Competitive highlights ==
GP: Grand Prix; JGP: Junior Grand Prix

=== Ladies' singles ===
International
| Event | 05–06 | 06–07 | 07–08 | 08–09 | 09–10 | 10–11 | 11–12 | 12–13 | 13–14 |
|---|---|---|---|---|---|---|---|---|---|
| Olympics | | | | | 7th | | | | |
| Worlds | | | | 5th | 9th | 12th | | | |
| Four Continents | | | | 7th | | 4th | | | |
| GP Final | | | | | | 6th | | | |
| GP Cup of China | | | | | 4th | | | | |
| GP NHK Trophy | | | | | | 2nd | | | |
| GP Rostel. Cup | | | | 2nd | | | 9th | | |
| GP Skate America | | | | 4th | 2nd | 2nd | | 9th | |
| GP Skate Canada | | | | | | | 10th | | |
| Cup of Nice | | | | | | | | | 9th |
International: Junior
| Junior Worlds | | | 1st | | | | | | |
| JGP Final | | | 2nd | | | | | | |
| JGP Austria | | | 1st | | | | | | |
| JGP Germany | | | 2nd | | | | | | |
| Challenge Cup | | 1st J | | | | | | | |
National
| U.S. Champ. | 2nd J | 5th | 2nd | 2nd | 1st | 2nd | 6th | | 18th |
Team events
| World Team; Trophy | | | | 1st T 4th P | | | | | |
J = Junior; T = Team result; P = Personal result. Medals awarded for team result only.

== Detailed results ==
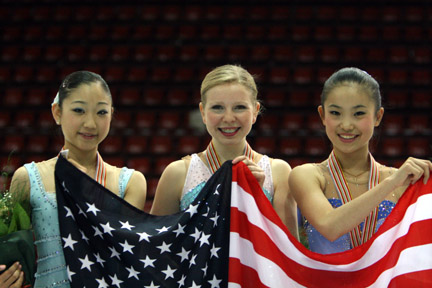
The ladies medalists at the 2008 World Junior Championships display the United States flag during the medals ceremony.

2013–14 season
| Date | Event | SP | FS | Total |
|---|---|---|---|---|
| January 5–12, 2014 | 2014 U.S. Championships | 20; 46.57 | 17; 88.57 | 18; 135.14 |
| October 23–27, 2013 | 2013 Cup of Nice | 18; 41.59 | 7; 88.59 | 9; 130.18 |
2012–13 season
| Date | Event | SP | FS | Total |
| October 19–21, 2012 | 2012 Skate America | 10; 43.72 | 9; 92.37 | 9; 136.09 |
2011–12 season
| Date | Event | SP | FS | Total |
| January 22–29, 2012 | 2012 U.S. Championships | 9; 52.71 | 4; 112.27 | 6; 164.98 |
| November 24–27, 2011 | 2011 Cup of Russia | 8; 53.36 | 9; 94.27 | 9; 147.63 |
| October 27–30, 2011 | 2011 Skate Canada | 3; 54.23 | 10; 73.99 | 10; 128.22 |
2010–11 season
| Date | Event | SP | FS | Total |
| April 25 – May 1, 2011 | 2011 World Championships | 8; 57.22 | 14; 97.39 | 12; 154.61 |
| February 15–20, 2011 | 2011 Four Continents Championships | 3; 62.23 | 4; 118.08 | 4; 180.31 |
| January 22–30, 2011 | 2011 U.S. Championships | 3; 62.32 | 2; 121.06 | 2; 183.38 |
| December 9–12, 2010 | 2010–2011 ISU Grand Prix Final | 6; 45.19 | 6; 82.38 | 6; 127.57 |
| November 11–14, 2010 | 2010 ISU Grand Prix Skate America | 4; 51.02 | 1; 111.84 | 2; 162.86 |
| October 22–24, 2010 | 2010 ISU Grand Prix NHK Trophy | 3; 53.69 | 1; 107.35 | 2; 161.04 |
2009–10 season
| Date | Event | SP | FS | Total |
| March 22–28, 2010 | 2010 World Championships | 6; 60.88 | 9; 106.56 | 9; 167.44 |
| February 14–27, 2010 | 2010 Winter Olympic Games | 5; 64.64 | 8; 117.85 | 7; 182.49 |
| January 14–24, 2010 | 2010 U.S. Championships | 3; 69.35 | 1; 130.76 | 1; 200.11 |
| November 12–15, 2009 | 2009 Skate America | 2; 58.80 | 1; 116.11 | 2; 174.91 |
| Oct. 29 – Nov. 1, 2009 | 2009 Cup of China | 5; 58.80 | 5; 98.91 | 4; 157.71 |
2008–09 season
| Date | Event | SP | FS | Total |
| April 16–19, 2009 | World Team Trophy | 5; 58.40 | 4; 113.41 | 4; 171.81 |
| March 23–29, 2009 | 2009 World Championships | 7; 59.30 | 5; 113.11 | 5; 172.41 |
| February 4–8, 2009 | 2009 Four Continents Championships | 8; 55.44 | 7; 107.39 | 7; 162.83 |
| January 18–25, 2009 | 2009 U.S. Championships | 2; 60.19 | 2; 113.59 | 2; 173.78 |
| November 20–23, 2008 | 2008 Cup of Russia | 3; 55.92 | 2; 110.14 | 2; 166.06 |
| October 23–26, 2008 | 2008 Skate America | 5; 54.92 | 4; 100.81 | 4; 155.73 |

2007–08 season
| Date | Event | Level | SP | FS | Total |
|---|---|---|---|---|---|
| Feb. 25 – March 2, 2008 | 2008 World Junior Championships | Junior | 3; 60.16 | 1; 112.03 | 1; 172.19 |
| January 20–27, 2008 | 2008 U.S. Championships | Senior | 3; 62.91 | 1; 125.82 | 2; 188.73 |
| December 6–9, 2007 | 2007–08 Junior Grand Prix Final | Junior | 3; 52.11 | 1; 107.55 | 2; 159.66 |
| October 10–13, 2007 | 2007 Junior Grand Prix, Germany | Junior | 3; 47.64 | 2; 83.21 | 2; 130.85 |
| September 12–15, 2007 | 2007 Junior Grand Prix, Austria | Junior | 2; 49.63 | 1; 105.02 | 1; 154.65 |

2006–07 season
| Date | Event | Level | SP | FS | Total |
|---|---|---|---|---|---|
| March 7–11, 2007 | 2007 Challenge Cup | Junior | 1; 46.00 | 1; 100.42 | 1; 146.42 |
| January 21–28, 2007 | 2007 U.S. Championships | Senior | 6; 56.51 | 5; 103.24 | 5; 159.75 |
2005–06 season
| Date | Event | Level | SP | FS | Total |
| January 7–15, 2006 | 2006 U.S. Championships | Junior | 1; 53.58 | 5; 83.87 | 2; 137.45 |
2004–05 season
| Date | Event | Level | SP | FS | Total |
| April 13–17, 2005 | 2005 Triglav Trophy | Novice | 1 | 1 | 1 |
| January 9–16, 2005 | 2005 U.S. Championships | Novice | 2 | 2 | 1 |
