= Caydee Denney =

American pair skater (born 1993)

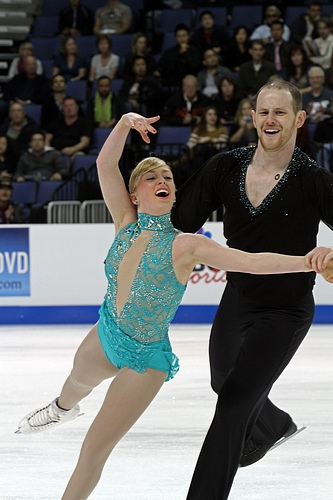
- Denney and Coughlin in 2011

Personal information
- Full name: Caydee Christine Denney
- Born: June 22, 1993 (age 33) Ocala, Florida, U.S.
- Height: 5 ft 1 in (1.54 m)

Figure skating career
- Country: United States
- Partner: John Coughlin
- Coach: Dalilah Sappenfield
- Skating club: Broadmoor SC
- Began skating: 2001
- Retired: July 29, 2015
Medal record
Representing United States
Figure skating: Pairs
Four Continents Championships
Silver medal – second place	2012 Colorado Springs	Pairs
World Team Trophy
Gold medal – first place	2009 Tokyo	Team
Silver medal – second place	2012 Tokyo	Team

Caydee Christine Denney (born June 22, 1993) is an American former competitive pair skater. With John Coughlin, she is the 2012 Four Continents silver medalist and 2012 U.S. national champion. With former partner Jeremy Barrett, Denney is the 2010 U.S. national champion. During the pairs short program at the 2010 Olympics, Denney and Barrett became the first team to land a throw triple Lutz jump at any Winter Olympic competition.

== Personal life ==
Caydee Denney was born in Ocala, Florida. She is the elder sister of American pair skater Haven Denney. Their parents, DeeDee and Bryan Denney, both competed in artistic roller skating.

== Career ==
Denney also competed as a single skater until 2009.

=== Partnership with Barrett ===
Denney and Barrett first began skating together in 2006, but the partnership did not last. They teamed up again in 2008 and began competing in the 2008–09 season. Based on their good performance during the summer non-qualifying competitions, Denney and Barrett were assigned to the 2008 Nebelhorn Trophy, where they placed 4th. They won the 2009 Eastern Sectionals to qualify for the national championships.

Denney/Barrett won the silver medal at the 2009 U.S. Nationals. They placed sixth at the 2009 Four Continents. The following season they won the U.S. national title and the right to compete at the Olympics, where they finished 13th. During the pairs short program at the 2010 Olympics, they became the first team to land a throw triple Lutz jump at any Winter Olympic competition. They placed 7th at the 2010 World Championships.

At the 2011 U.S. Nationals, they won the bronze medal and were assigned to compete at Four Continents, however they were forced to withdraw; Denney accidentally sliced Barrett's calf on his right leg while practicing side-by-side jumps.

Denney and Barrett ended their partnership in February 2011.

=== Partnership with Coughlin ===
==== 2011–2012 season ====
On May 17, 2011, Denney announced that she had teamed up with John Coughlin. They train under coach Dalilah Sappenfield at the Broadmoor Skating Club in Colorado Springs, Colorado, Denney having relocated from Wesley Chapel, Florida after splitting from her previous partner. Denney and Coughlin have a height difference of 14 inches (36 cm). They made their competitive debut at the Liberty Summer competition in July 2011, winning the short program. At the Nebelhorn Trophy they won the bronze medal. They were assigned to the 2011 Skate America and 2011 NHK Trophy, where they placed fourth and fifth respectively.

Denney/Coughlin went on to win the 2012 US Championships and were assigned to Four Continents and Worlds. They won the silver medal at the 2012 Four Continents and then placed eighth at 2012 Worlds.

==== 2012–2013 season ====
Denney/Coughlin made their season debut at the 2012 Nebelhorn Trophy, winning the silver medal. They won bronze medals at both of their Grand Prix assignments, the 2012 Skate America and the 2012 Rostelecom Cup. On December 4, 2012, Coughlin underwent surgery to repair a torn labrum in his left hip. As a result, the pair missed the 2013 U.S. Championships but they submitted a petition to be considered for the U.S. team to the 2013 World Championships. They were named in the U.S. team to the event but decided not to compete. Coughlin was off the ice for about nine weeks.

==== 2013–2014 season ====
Denney/Coughlin won silver at the 2013 U.S. Classic, placed fourth at the 2013 Skate America, and won bronze at the 2013 Trophée Eric Bompard. They took the bronze medal at the 2014 U.S. Championships, finishing behind champions Marissa Castelli / Simon Shnapir and silver medalists Felicia Zhang / Nathan Bartholomay, whose total score was greater by 0.29 of a point. Denney/Coughlin did not receive one of the two American spots in the pairs' event at the 2014 Winter Olympics but were assigned to the 2014 World Championships. They withdrew due to Denney's right ankle injury, sustained in practice on March 19. Denney was expected to return to training after eight to twelve weeks. In June 2014, the pair stated they would not compete in the 2014–15 season.

== Programs ==
=== With Coughlin ===
Season	Short program	Free skating	Exhibition
2013–2014	Tosca by Giacomo Puccini	Phantom of the Opera by Andrew Lloyd Webber	Save a Horse (Ride a Cowboy) by Big & Rich
2012–2013	Swing medley by Big Bad Voodoo Daddy and Swing Kids	Phantom of the Opera by Andrew Lloyd Webber	Summertime Fantasy (from American Idol)
2011–2012	East of Eden (1981 TV mini-series) by Lee Holdridge performed by the London Symphony Orchestra	Nessun dorma Vanessa-Mae, Jeff Beck version	Mambo No. 5 by Lou Bega

=== With Barrett ===
Season	Short program	Free skating	Exhibition
2010–2011	Love Theme from Cousins by Angelo Badalamenti choreo. by David Wilson	Rhapsody in Blue by George Gershwin choreo. by David Wilson	The Great Divide by Scott Stapp
2009–2010	The Firebird by Igor Stravinsky	Scheherazade by Nikolai Rimsky-Korsakov	You Can Leave Your Hat On by Joe Cocker
2008–2009	Palladio by Silent Nick; Summer Haze by Vanessa-Mae	Spartacus by Aram Khachaturian	Cryin' by Aerosmith

== Competitive highlights ==
=== Pairs career with Coughlin ===
International
Event	2011–12	2012–13	2013–14
World Champ.	8th	WD	WD
Four Continents Champ.	2nd		
GP NHK Trophy	5th		
GP Rostelecom Cup		3rd	
GP Skate America	4th	3rd	4th
GP Trophée Éric Bompard			3rd
Nebelhorn Trophy	3rd	2nd	
U.S. Classic			2nd
National
U.S. Championships	1st	WD	3rd
Team events
World Team Trophy	2nd T (4th P)		

=== Pairs career with Barrett ===
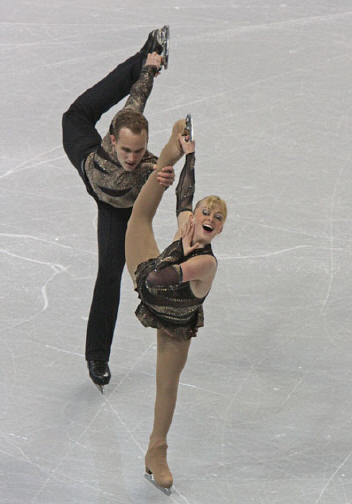
Denney and Barrett in 2009

International
Event	2008–09	2009–10	2010–11
Winter Olympics		13th	
World Championships	9th	7th	
Four Continents Champ.	6th		
GP NHK Trophy		4th	5th
GP Skate America			4th
GP Skate Canada		5th	
Nebelhorn Trophy	4th		
National
U.S. Championships	2nd	1st	3rd
Team event
World Team Trophy	1st T (4th P)		
