= Jeremy Barrett (figure skater) =

American pair skater (born 1984)

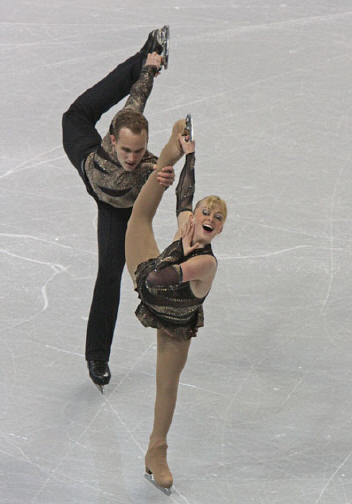
- Denney and Barrett in 2009.

Personal information
- Born: April 10, 1984 (age 42) Sarasota, Florida
- Height: 5 ft 8 in (173 cm)

Figure skating career
- Country: United States
- Skating club: Southwest Florida FSC
- Began skating: 1992
- Retired: 2011
Medal record
Representing United States
Figure skating: Pairs
World Team Trophy
Gold medal – first place	2009 Tokyo	Team

Jeremy Barrett (born April 10, 1984) is an American former pair skater. With Caydee Denney, he became the 2010 U.S. national champion and competed at the 2010 Winter Olympics. During the pairs short program at the 2010 Olympics, Denney and Barrett became the first team to land a throw triple Lutz jump at any Winter Olympic competition.

== Personal life ==
Barrett was born on April 10, 1984, in Sarasota, Florida. He married former pair skater Lucy Galleher on April 30, 2016, in Fort Lauderdale, Florida.

== Career ==
Barrett began skating at the age of eight. He competed as a single skater on the novice level at the regional level. His first pairs partner was his sister Shawn-Marie and they competed at the U.S. Junior Championships.

Barrett teamed up with Shantel Jordan in 2001. Because of the age difference between them, they were unable to compete internationally on the junior level. They were the 2004 U.S. national junior champions. They competed at the 2005 French Championships as guests and placed first on the senior level. Their partnership ended in 2006.

Barrett began skating with Caydee Denney in 2006 but the partnership did not last. They teamed up again in 2008 and began competing in the 2008-09 season. They placed 4th at the 2008 Nebelhorn Trophy. They won the silver medal at the 2009 U.S. Nationals. They placed sixth at the 2009 Four Continents Championships. The following season they won the U.S. national title and the right to compete at the Olympics where they finished 13th. During the pairs short program at the 2010 Olympics, they became the first team to land a throw triple Lutz jump at any Winter Olympic competition. They placed 7th at the 2010 World Championships.

Denney/Barrett were coached by Jim Peterson in Ellenton, Florida until August 2010, when the pair joined John Zimmerman and Silvia Fontana in Coral Springs, Florida. At the 2011 U.S. Nationals, they won the bronze medal and were assigned to compete at Four Continents, however they were forced to withdraw. Denney accidentally sliced Barrett's calf on his right leg while practicing side-by-side jumps. He explained that "It cut all the way to the muscle, so I had to get 12 stitches on the muscles, 14 to close that up and 16 on the outside."

Denney and Barrett ended their partnership in February 2011. Barrett said he intended to focus on coaching and performing in shows.

== Programs ==
(with Denney)

Season	Short program	Free skating	Exhibition
2010–2011	Love Theme from Cousins by Angelo Badalamenti choreo. by David Wilson	Rhapsody in Blue by George Gershwin choreo. by David Wilson	The Great Divide by Scott Stapp
2009–2010	The Firebird by Igor Stravinsky	Scheherazade by Nikolai Rimsky-Korsakov	You Can Leave Your Hat On by Joe Cocker
2008–2009	Palladio by Silent Nick; Summer Haze by Vanessa-Mae	Spartacus by Aram Khachaturian	Cryin' by Aerosmith

== Competitive highlights ==
=== With Denney ===
International
Event	2008–09	2009–10	2010–11
Winter Olympics		13th	
World Championships	9th	7th	
Four Continents Champ.	6th		
GP NHK Trophy		4th	5th
GP Skate America			4th
GP Skate Canada		5th	
Nebelhorn Trophy	4th		
National
U.S. Championships	2nd	1st	3rd
Eastern Sectionals	1st		
Team events
World Team Trophy	1st T 4th P		
T = Team result; P = Personal result; Medals awarded for team result only.

=== With Jordan ===
Event	01–02	02–03	03–04	04–05	05–06
U.S. Championships	9th N	9th J	1st J	10th	11th
French Championships				1st G	
NACS Waterloo				2nd	
Eastern Sectionals	1st N	3rd J	1st J	3rd	2nd
Levels: N = Novice; J = Junior; G = Competed as guest skaters
