= Jordan Cowan =

American figure skater and cameraman

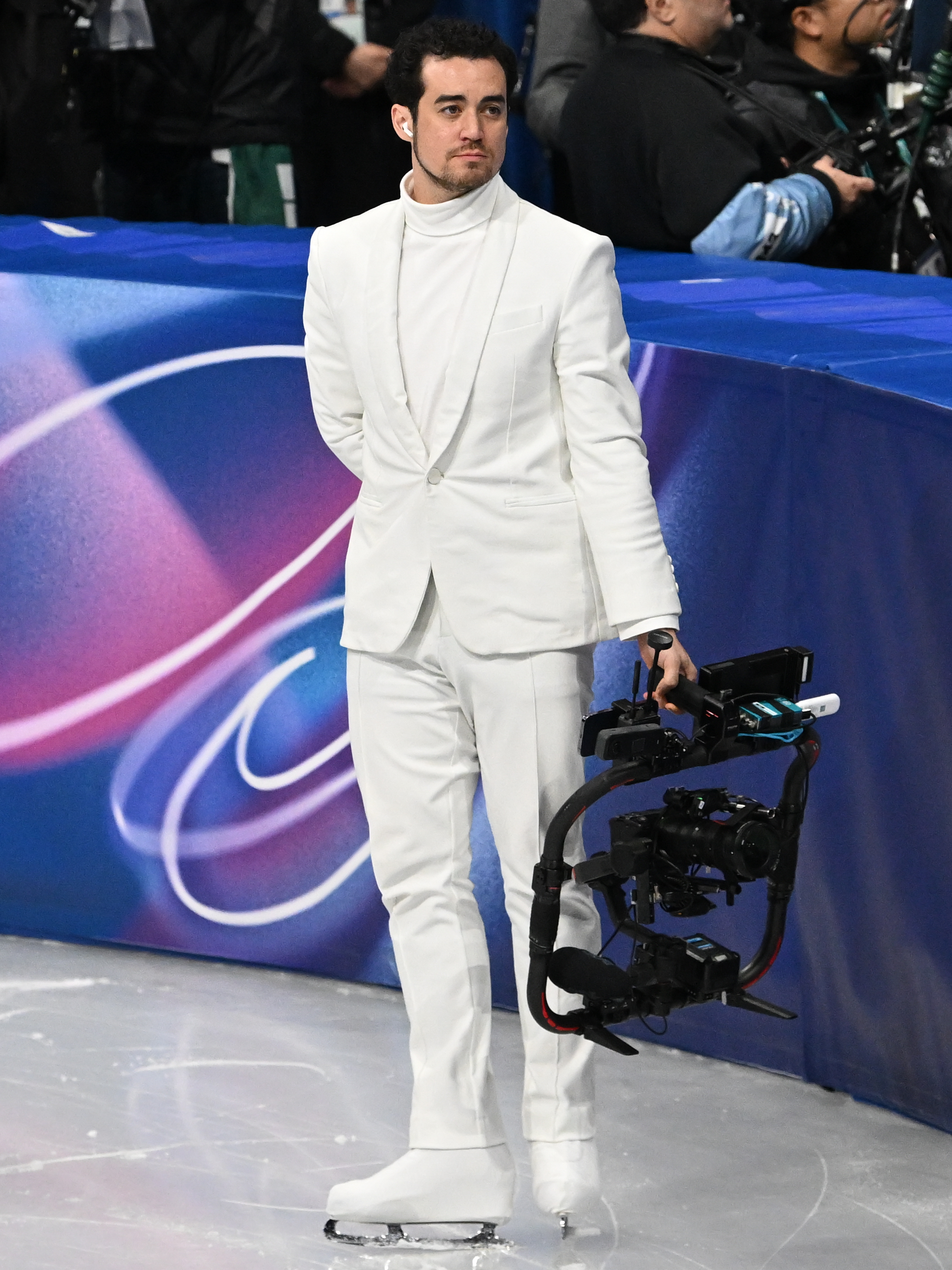

Personal information
- Born: June 20, 1990 (age 36) Los Angeles, California, United States
- Home town: Ann Arbor, Michigan, United States
- Height: 183 cm (6 ft 0 in)

Figure skating career
- Country: United States
- Discipline: Ice dance
- Partner: Anastasia Olson
- Coach: Igor Shpilband; Yaroslava Nechaeva; Yuri Chesnichenko
- Skating club: Detroit Skating Club
- Began skating: 1999
- Retired: 2011

Medal record

Jordan Cowan (born 20 June 1990) is an American on-ice videographer and former competitive ice dancer. Cowan was born in Los Angeles and started skating at the age of 8. He later moved to Ann Arbor, Michigan for training. Cowan partnered with Anastasia Olson to compete in six U.S. Figure Skating Championships before retiring from competition in 2011 or 2012.

After retiring from competition, Cowan became a ballroom dancer, skating coach, and enrolled in a computer science course. In 2018, he launched On Ice Perspectives and started filming figure skating performances from the ice. He became the first on-ice camera operator for a live figure skating broadcast in the 2019 series of Dancing on Ice, for which he was nominated for a Guild of Television Camera Professionals award. Cowan has also worked on The Real Full Monty on Ice, Battle of the Blades, and various international figure skating competitions.

Cowan filmed the figure skating at the 2026 Winter Olympics, becoming the first on-ice camera operator for an Olympic figure skating event. He wore a custom white suit designed by a figure skating tailor, and operated a handheld camera rig that he designed.
