= Joelle Forte =

American figure skater

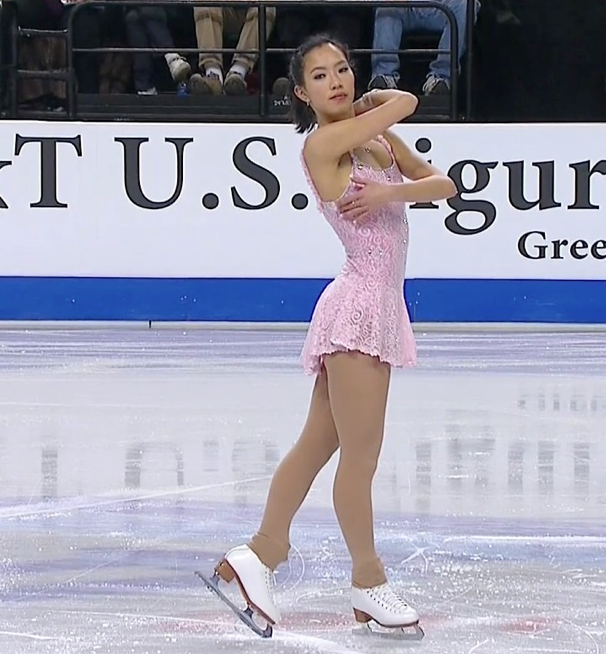
- Joelle Forte skates her free program at the 2011 U.S. Championships

Personal information
- Born: July 5, 1986 (age 40)
- Home town: Merrick, New York
- Height: 5 ft 1 in (1.55 m)

Figure skating career
- Country: United States
- Coach: Dmitri Gromov
- Skating club: SC of New York
- Began skating: 1990

Joelle Forte (born July 5, 1986) is an American former figure skater. She is a five-time North Atlantic Regional champion, the 2009 Eastern Sectional champion, and represented the United States at Skate America in October 2011, Nebelhorn Trophy in September 2011, and Gradena Spring Trophy in May 2011.

== Career ==
Forte began skating at age four and entered her first qualifying competition in 1996, at age ten. That year, she placed fourth at the juvenile level at North Atlantic Regionals. Forte first competed nationally during the 1999–2000 season, when she finished ninth at the National Championships at the novice level. She continued skating for over a decade following that season, not qualifying for the National Championships again for several years. Forte retired temporarily, not competing during the 2004–2005 season due to chronic back injury, but returned after a year and a half away, citing her ongoing love for the sport. She finally made it back to Nationals in 2008–2009, by which point she was competing as a senior, the oldest skater in the ladies competition.

In the 2009–2010 season, Forte intended to represent Azerbaijan, although, due to paperwork issues, she never had an opportunity to actually compete on its behalf. She resumed representing the United States. During the 2010–2011 season, Forte received her first senior international assignment, Gardena Spring Trophy, and the following season, she was assigned to represent the United States at Skate America, the first Grand Prix assignment of her career. Though unusual for a skater to add new jumps to her repertoire so late in her career, Forte included a triple flip in her short program for the first time at the 2011 Liberty Summer competition, and is working on adding a triple toe loop-triple toe loop combination for the 2011-12 competitive season.

Forte has performed with the Ice Theatre of New York. She also regularly participates in One Step Closer, an annual HIV/AIDS benefit show.

Before the start 2013-2014 competitive season, Joelle suffered a major setback to her training due to an infection in her right ankle which caused her to be hospitalized for a week. She lost 3 months of skating and training and only started competing at the end of August. She went on to win North Atlantic Regionals Championship and won bronze at Eastern Sectional Championship. She had a personal best score of 52.86 for her short program at Eastern Sectional Championship. She qualified for the 2014 U.S. Prudential Figure Skating National Championships.

== Personal life ==
Forte modeled with the Ford Agency for 10 years to help support her skating. She has modeled for Vogue Bambini, Ralph Lauren, Bloomingdale's, Saks Fifth Avenue, Macy's, etc. She graduated from Fordham University in May 2010 with a Bachelor's degree in psychology, and has graduated with a master's degree in May 2018 from Adelphi University for nutrition.

== Programs ==
Season	Short program	Free skating	Exhibition
2013–14	Feeling Good by Michael Bublé	Mr. & Mrs. Smith by John Powell	
2012–13	Feeling Good by Michael Bublé	The 13th Warrior by Jerry Goldsmith	
2011–12	O (Cirque du Soleil) by Benoît Jutras	The 13th Warrior by Jerry Goldsmith	
2010–11	O (Cirque du Soleil) by Benoît Jutras	Piano Concerto No. 2 by Sergei Rachmaninoff	
2009–10	Did not compete this season	Did not compete this season	Taking Chances by Celine Dion
2008–09	Mr. & Mrs. Smith by John Powell	Madama Butterfly by Giacomo Puccini	

== Competitive highlights ==
International
Event	07–08	08–09	10–11	11–12	12–13	13-14
GP Skate America				8th		
Nebelhorn				7th		
Gardena			4th			
Kempen Trophy	1st					
National
U.S. Champ.		12th	9th	14th	15th	21st
