= John Coughlin (figure skater) =

American pair skater (1985–2019)

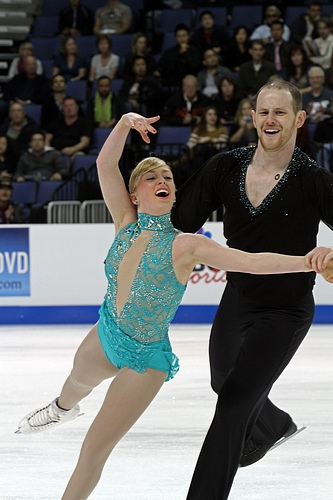
- Denney and Coughlin in 2011

Personal information
- Full name: John Patrick Coughlin
- Born: December 1, 1985 Kansas City, Missouri, U.S.
- Died: January 18, 2019 (aged 33) Kansas City, Missouri, U.S
- Height: 6 ft 3 in (1.90 m)

Figure skating career
- Country: United States
- Coach: Dalilah Sappenfield, Larry Ibarra
- Skating club: Kansas City FSC
- Began skating: 1989
- Retired: July 29, 2015
Medal record
Figure skating: Pairs
Representing United States
Four Continents Championships
Silver medal – second place	2012 Colorado Springs	Pairs
World Team Trophy
Silver medal – second place	2012 Tokyo	Team

John Patrick Coughlin (December 1, 1985 – January 18, 2019) was an American pair skater. With Caydee Denney, he was the 2012 Four Continents silver medalist and 2012 U.S. national champion. With previous partner Caitlin Yankowskas, he was the 2011 U.S. champion. Coughlin died by suicide, one day after the United States Center for SafeSport announced he would face an interim temporary suspension over unspecified allegations.

== Early life and family ==
Coughlin was born in Kansas City, Missouri. He was the son of a third-generation police officer. His mother, Stacy, died in February 2010 due to a chronic illness. He had a sister, Angela Laune.

== Career ==
=== Early years ===
Coughlin began skating at the age of six. Early in his career, he competed with Krista Smith, Kelsey Parker, and Lucy Galleher. He teamed up with Bridget Namiotka in late 2004. They were the 2006 junior national silver medalists. They announced the end of their partnership on July 3, 2007.

=== Partnership with Yankowskas ===
Dalilah Sappenfield suggested Caitlin Yankowskas as a potential partner and they had a tryout in early August 2007. Yankowskas/Coughlin trained under Sappenfield in Colorado Springs, Colorado. They placed sixth at the 2008 U.S. Championships and made their Grand Prix debut at the 2008 Skate America.

During the 2010–11 season, their Ave Maria long program was a tribute to Coughlin's mother who died in February 2010. They finished fourth at 2010 NHK Trophy and won the first Grand Prix medal, bronze, at Cup of China. At the 2011 U.S. Nationals, they placed first in the short program and then won the free program to earn their first national title.

In April 2011, Yankowskas/Coughlin placed sixth in their debut at the World Championships. It was the best result by an American pair since 2006. On May 4, however, the pair announced that their partnership had ended.

=== Partnership with Denney ===
==== 2011–2012 season ====
On May 17, 2011, Coughlin announced that he had teamed up with Caydee Denney. They trained under coach Sappenfield at the Broadmoor Skating Club in Colorado Springs. Denney and Coughlin had a height differential of 14 inches (36 cm). They made their competitive debut at the Liberty Summer competition in July 2011, winning the short program. At the Nebelhorn Trophy they won the bronze medal. They were assigned to the 2011 Skate America and 2011 NHK Trophy, where they placed fourth and fifth respectively.

Denney/Coughlin went on to win the 2012 US Championships and were assigned to Four Continents and Worlds. They won the silver medal at the 2012 Four Continents and placed eighth at 2012 Worlds.

==== 2012–2013 season ====
Denney/Coughlin made their season debut at the 2012 Nebelhorn Trophy, winning the silver medal. They won bronze medals at both of their Grand Prix assignments, the 2012 Skate America and the 2012 Rostelecom Cup. On December 4, 2012, Coughlin underwent surgery to repair a torn labrum in his left hip. As a result, the pair missed the 2013 U.S. Championships but they submitted a petition to be considered for the U.S. team to the 2013 World Championships. They were named in the U.S. team to the event but decided not to compete. Coughlin was off the ice for about nine weeks.

==== 2013–2014 season ====
Denney/Coughlin won silver at the 2013 U.S. Classic, placed fourth at the 2013 Skate America, and won bronze at the 2013 Trophée Eric Bompard. They took the bronze medal at the 2014 U.S. Championships, finishing behind champions Marissa Castelli / Simon Shnapir and silver medalists Felicia Zhang / Nathan Bartholomay, whose total score was greater by 0.29 of a point. Denney/Coughlin did not receive one of the two American spots in the pairs' event at the 2014 Winter Olympics but were assigned to the 2014 World Championships. They withdrew due to Denney's right ankle injury, sustained in practice on March 19. Denney was expected to return to training after eight to twelve weeks. In June 2014, the pair stated they would not compete in the 2014–15 season.

== Sexual assault allegations, skating suspension, and death ==
On December 17, 2018, the United States Center for SafeSport listed Coughlin's name with the note "Interim Measure – Restriction", following allegations that he denied. He subsequently resigned as U.S. brand manager for John Wilson Blades. On January 17, 2019, after SafeSport had changed Coughlin's status to "interim suspension", U.S. Figure Skating suspended him.

The following afternoon, police were dispatched to his father's home in Kansas City following a report that Coughlin had been found dead by hanging. The department confirmed Coughlin's manner of death to be suicide. The incident report stated that he hanged himself.

In February 2019, SafeSport closed the investigation, saying that "[the Center] cannot advance an investigation when no potential threat exists."

In May 2019, in a Facebook post, former skating partner Bridget Namiotka accused Coughlin of having sexually abused her over a period of two years in the mid-2000s and of hurting at least nine other individuals. She had skated with him while she was between the ages of 14 and 17. He was four years older than she was.

Namiotka died on July 25, 2022. Her parents released a statement that said, in part, "Bridget succumbed to her long struggles with addiction after several very difficult years of dealing with the trauma of sexual abuse."

In July 2019, former US ladies' champion and World silver medalist Ashley Wagner reported that Coughlin had sexually assaulted her in 2008 at a US national team training camp.

In December 2019, former US skater Melissa Bulanhagui accused Coughlin of having groomed her and other underage skaters at the rink where they both trained. Bulanhagui was between the ages of 14 and 18 at the time, and Coughlin was five years her senior.

== Programs ==
=== With Denney ===
Season	Short program	Free skating	Exhibition
2013–2014	Tosca by Giacomo Puccini	Phantom of the Opera by Andrew Lloyd Webber	Save a Horse (Ride a Cowboy) by Big & Rich
2012–2013	Swing medley by Big Bad Voodoo Daddy and Swing Kids	Phantom of the Opera by Andrew Lloyd Webber	Summertime Fantasy (from American Idol)
2011–2012	East of Eden (1981 TV mini-series) by Lee Holdridge performed by the London Symphony Orchestra	Nessun dorma Vanessa-Mae, Jeff Beck version	Mambo No. 5 by Lou Bega

=== With Yankowskas ===
Season	Short program	Free skating
2010–2011	Oblivion by Astor Piazzolla	Ave Maria by Franz Schubert
2009–2010	Sonata for Piano No. 16 by Wolfgang Amadeus Mozart	Pearl Harbor by Hans Zimmer
2008–2009	The Swan by Camille Saint-Saëns	Bram Stoker's Dracula by Wojciech Kilar
2007–2008	The Swan by Camille Saint-Saëns	Bram Stoker's Dracula by Wojciech Kilar

=== With Namiotka ===
Season	Short program	Free skating
2006–2007	Summertime by George Gershwin arranged by Kenny G	Pearl Harbor by Hans Zimmer; Freedom by Michael W. Smith
2005–2006	Time to Say Good Bye; Disco Firebird	The Prince of Egypt by Hans Zimmer

== Competitive highlights ==
=== With Denney ===
International
Event	2011–12	2012–13	2013–14
World Champ.	8th	WD	WD
Four Continents Champ.	2nd		
GP NHK Trophy	5th		
GP Rostelecom Cup		3rd	
GP Skate America	4th	3rd	4th
GP Trophée Éric Bompard			3rd
Nebelhorn Trophy	3rd	2nd	
U.S. Classic			2nd
National
U.S. Championships	1st	WD	3rd
Team events
World Team Trophy	2nd T (4th P)		
WD = Withdrew; T = Team result; P = Personal result; Medals awarded for team result only.

=== With Yankowskas ===
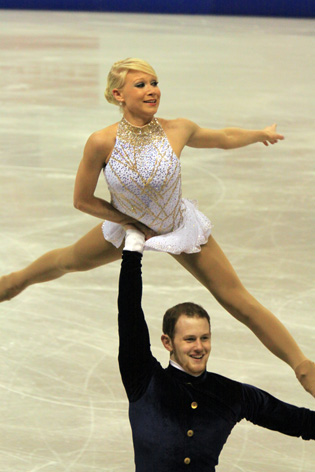
Yankowskas and Coughlin in 2009

International
Event	2007–08	2008–09	2009–10	2010–11
World Champ.				6th
Four Continents Champ.			4th	4th
GP Cup of China				3rd
GP NHK Trophy				4th
GP Skate America		6th		
GP Skate Canada			7th	
Ice Challenge			1st	
Nebelhorn Trophy		6th		
National
U.S. Championships	6th	7th	6th	1st
Midwestern Sectionals	1st	1st		

=== With Namiotka ===
International
Event	2005–06	2006–07
World Junior Champ.	4th	4th
JGP Final	5th	6th
JGP Canada	4th	
JGP Croatia	1st	
JGP Czech Republic		3rd
JGP Norway		2nd
National
U.S. Championships	2nd J.	9th
J. = Junior level

=== With Galleher ===
Event	2004
U.S. Championships	6th J.
J. = Junior level

=== Men's singles ===
Event	2005
U.S. Championships	12th J.
N. = Novice level J. = Junior level
