= Colin Grafton =

American pair skater (born 1991)

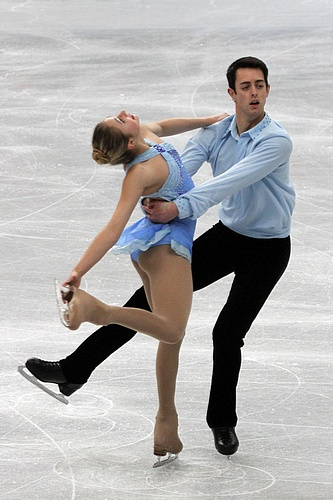
- Grafton with Duarte in 2012

Personal information
- Born: September 19, 1991 (age 35) Providence, Rhode Island, U.S.
- Home town: North Attleborough, Massachusetts, U.S.
- Height: 6 ft 0 in (1.83 m)

Figure skating career
- Country: United States
- Skating club: All Year FSC Culver City
- Began skating: 1998

Colin Grafton (born September 19, 1991, in Providence, Rhode Island) is an American pair skater and model. With former partner Kylie Duarte, he is the 2012 U.S. junior bronze medalist and finished eighth at the 2012 World Junior Championships in Minsk. The pair announced the end of their partnership in October 2012. He came out as gay in 2024.

== Programs ==
(with Duarte)

Season	Short program	Free skating
2012–2013	Slumdog Millionaire by A. R. Rahman	Romeo and Juliet by Nino Rota
2011–2012	Meditation (from Thaïs) by Jules Massenet	Doctor Zhivago by Maurice Jarre performed by City of Prague Philharmonic Orchestra
2010–2011	The Feeling Begins (from The Last Temptation of Christ) by Peter Gabriel	The Phantom of the Opera by Andrew Lloyd Webber
2009–2010	Theme from Ice Castles by Marvin Hamlisch	Rhapsody in Blue by George Gershwin

== Competitive highlights ==
=== With Duarte ===
International
Event	2008–09	2009–10	2010–11	2011–12
Junior Worlds				8th
JGP Austria				6th
JGP Czech Republic			7th	
JGP Latvia				9th
JGP United Kingdom			5th	
JGP United States		9th		
National
U.S. Championships	9th N	4th N	7th J	3rd J
Levels: J = Junior; N = Novice; JGP = Junior Grand Prix

== Dancing on Ice ==
In 2023, Grafton appeared in series 15 of ITV's Dancing on Ice, partnered with The Vivienne. They made it to the Final.

In 2024, Grafton returned as a professional on the show, this time partnered with Claire Sweeney They were eliminated in Week Four of the competition.
