= Chris Obzansky =

American ice dancer

Personal information
- Born: December 13, 1983 (age 42) Wilmington, Delaware, U.S.
- Height: 5 ft 10 in (1.78 m)

Figure skating career
- Country: United States
- Skating club: Figure Skating Club of Park City

Chris Obzansky (born December 13, 1983) is an American former competitive ice dancer.

== Career ==
With partner Lydia Manon, Obzansky competed domestically in the novice and junior ranks. They won the silver medal at the 1999 United States Figure Skating Championships.

With Kendra Goodwin, he is the 2001 U.S. junior national silver medalist. They placed 15th at the 2001 World Junior Figure Skating Championships. They won the 2000 Junior Grand Prix event in China.

Obzansky, chose to end the partnership with Goodwin in February, 2003 in order to serve as a missionary in the Baltics. After his return, he announced he would once again team up with Goodwin to compete in the 2005/2006 season. However, they never made it to Nationals.

He teamed up with Mimi Whetstone in 2006. They placed 10th at the 2007 United States Figure Skating Championships and 8th at the 2008 United States Figure Skating Championships. They were coached by Igor Shpilband and Marina Zoueva. That partnership ended in 2008.

Obzansky announced a new partnership with Trina Pratt in the summer of 2008. They announced the end of their partnership in 2010.

== Personal life ==
Obzansky now coaches in Park City and Salt Lake City.

== Competitive highlights ==
=== With Pratt ===
| Event | 2008–2009 | 2009–2010 |
|---|---|---|
| U.S. Championships | 7th | 9th |

=== With Whetstone ===
| Event | 2006–2007 | 2007–2008 |
|---|---|---|
| U.S. Championships | 10th | 8th |

=== With Goodwin ===
| Event | 2000–2001 | 2001–2002 | 2002–2003 |
|---|---|---|---|
| World Junior Championships | 15th | | |
| U.S. Championships | 2nd J. | 3rd J. | 8th |
| Golden Spin, Zagreb | | | 2nd |
| Helmut Seibt Memorial | | 2nd J. | |
| Junior Grand Prix, Mexico | 5th | | |
| Junior Grand Prix, China | 1st | | |
J. = Junior level

=== With Manon ===
| Event | 1999–2000 |
|---|---|
| U.S. Championships | 6th J. |
J. = Junior level
