= Trina Pratt =

American ice dancer

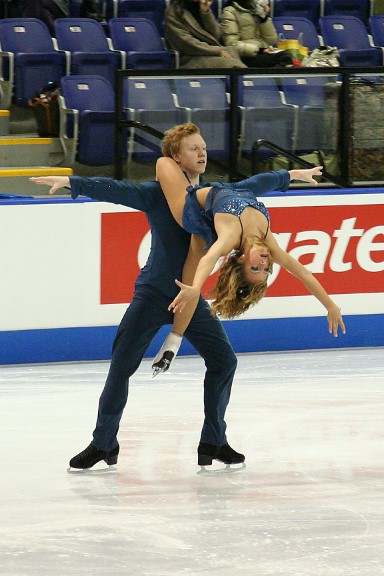
- Pratt and Gilles in 2006.

Personal information
- Born: August 30, 1986 (age 39) Iowa City, Iowa

Figure skating career
- Former partners: Chris Obzansky, Todd Gilles, Robert Pratt
- Country: United States
- Skating club: Broadmoor SC

Trina Pratt (born August 30, 1986) is an American former competitive ice dancer. With Todd Gilles, she won four ISU Junior Grand Prix medals and the 2005 U.S. national junior title, and placed sixth at the 2006 World Junior Championships.

Pratt initially competed with her brother, Robert. She teamed up with Todd Gilles at the 2002 Lake Placid, New York, dance competition. They announced the ending of their partnership on December 13, 2006. She teamed up with Chris Obzansky in 2008.

== Programs ==
(with Gilles)

Season	Original dance	Free dance
2006–2007	La Yumba; Whatever Lola Wants	Dream On by Aerosmith
2005–2006	Mas Que Nada; Meditation by Brazilian 66	House of Flying Daggers; Kodo Drums
2004–2005	Won't You Charleston With Me?; Let There Be Love by Nat King Cole; Let Yourself Go	Romeo + Juliet
2003–2004	Big Bad Voodoo Daddy	Goldfrapp

== Competitive highlights ==
=== With Chris Obzansky ===
Event	2008–09	2009–10
U.S. Championships	7th	9th

=== With Todd Gilles ===
International
Event	2003–04	2004–05	2005–06	2006–07
GP NHK Trophy				7th
GP Skate Canada				9th
International: Junior
World Junior Championships		8th	6th	
Junior Grand Prix Final			8th	
JGP Bulgaria	7th			
JGP China		3rd		
JGP Croatia			2nd	
JGP Hungary		3rd		
JGP Slovakia			3rd	
National
U.S. Championships	3rd J.	1st J.	8th	
