= Ian Lorello =

American ice dancer

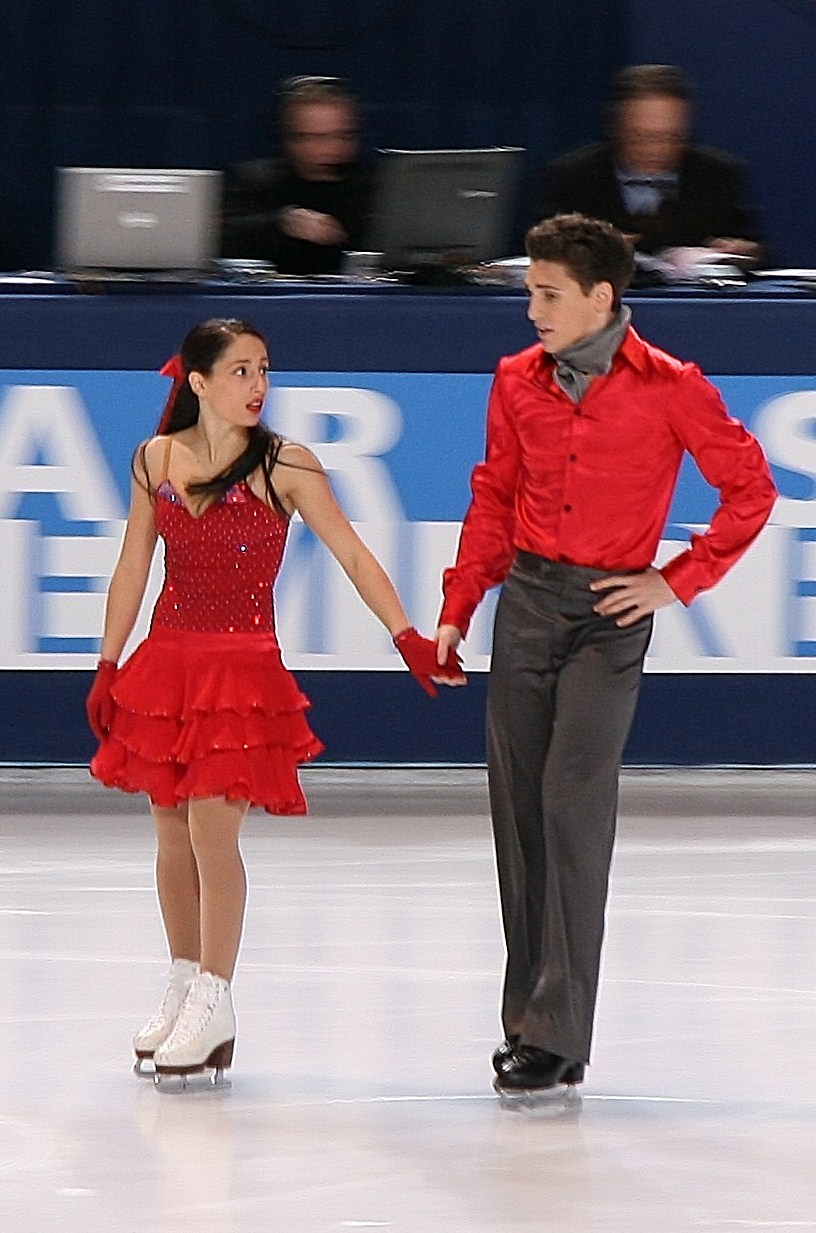
- Cannuscio and Lorello in 2010.

Personal information
- Born: May 7, 1990 (age 36) Romeoville, Illinois, U.S.
- Height: 5 ft 8 in (1.73 m)

Figure skating career
- Country: United States
- Partner: Laura Seal
- Coach: Karen Ludington; Alexander Kirsanov; Christie Moxley
- Skating club: University of Delaware FSC
- Began skating: 1995

Ian Lorello (born May 7, 1990) is an American former competitive ice dancer. With Isabella Cannuscio, he is the 2011 Ice Challenge silver medalist and the 2010 U.S. national junior pewter medalist. They competed at three Grand Prix events and won two bronze medals on the ISU Junior Grand Prix series. They announced the end of their partnership in March 2012.

Ian's elder brother, Alexander, placed 12th in ice dancing at the 2009 U.S. Championships. His younger siblings, Grant and Meara, won medals in ice dancing at the 2011 U.S. Junior Championships.

== Programs ==
(with Cannuscio)

| Season | Short dance | Free dance |
|---|---|---|
| 2011–2012 | Cuando Pienso En Ti by José Feliciano; Tequila by The Champs | Les Misérables by Claude-Michel Schönberg |
| 2010–2011 | Piano Man by Billy Joel | West Side Story by Leonard Bernstein |
| | Original dance | |
| 2009–2010 | Kapoe by Chuck Jonkey | Hernando's Hideaway performed by Ella Fitzgerald; Hernando's Hideaway performed by Harry Connick Jr. |
| 2008–2009 | In the Mood performed by The Puppini Sisters; Boogie Woogie Bugle Boy performed by Bette Midler | The Godfather performed by Edvin Marton |
| 2007–2008 | Zulu chants | Jive (from Edward Scissorhands) |

== Competitive highlights ==
GP: Grand Prix; JGP: Junior Grand Prix

(with Cannuscio)

International
| Event | 07–08 | 08–09 | 09–10 | 10–11 | 11–12 |
|---|---|---|---|---|---|
| GP Bompard | | | | 7th | |
| GP Cup of China | | | | 10th | |
| GP Skate America | | | | | 7th |
| Ice Challenge | | | | | 2nd |
International: Junior
| JGP Final | | | 6th | | |
| JGP Belarus | | 4th | | | |
| JGP Bulgaria | 8th | | | | |
| JGP Italy | | 5th | | | |
| JGP Poland | | | 3rd | | |
| JGP Turkey | | | 3rd | | |
National
| U.S. Champ. | 9th J | 5th J | 4th J | 6th | 9th |
J = Junior
