= Isabella Cannuscio =

American ice dancer

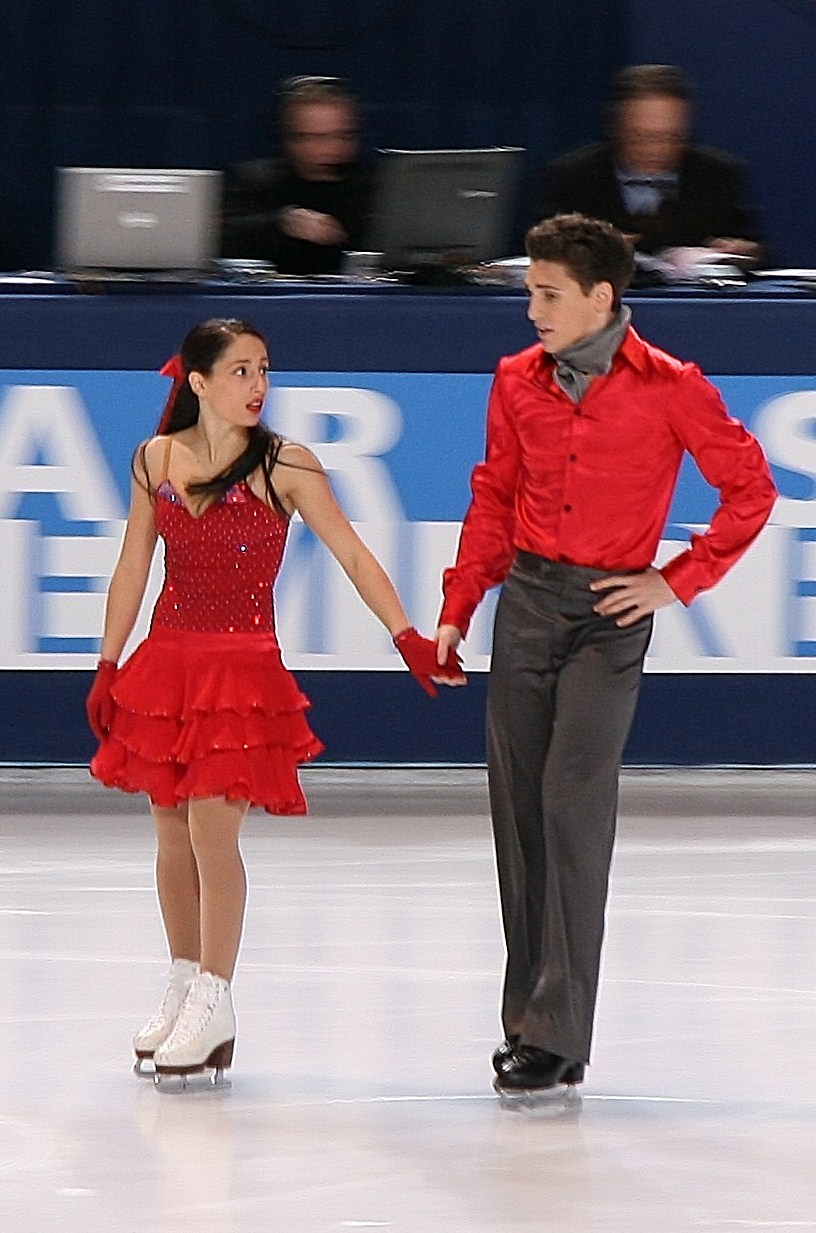
- Cannuscio and Lorello in 2010

Personal information
- Born: December 29, 1990 (age 35) Philadelphia, Pennsylvania, U.S.
- Height: 4 ft 11 in (1.50 m)

Figure skating career
- Country: United States
- Partner: Michael Bramante, Ian Lorello, Zachary Varraux, Kyle Herring
- Coach: Karen Ludington, Alexander Kirsanov, Christie Moxley
- Skating club: University of Delaware FSC
- Began skating: 1994
- Retired: 2014

Isabella Cannuscio (born December 29, 1990, in Philadelphia) is an American former competitive ice dancer. With Ian Lorello, she is the 2011 Ice Challenge silver medalist and the 2010 U.S. national junior pewter medalist. They competed at three Grand Prix events and won two bronze medals on the ISU Junior Grand Prix series. They announced the end of their partnership in March 2012. Cannuscio then competed for two seasons with Michael Bramante.

Early in her career, Cannuscio skated with Kyle Herring. From 2005–2006, she competed with Zachary Varraux.

She is the sister of American ice dancer Anastasia Cannuscio and married her sister's partner, Colin McManus, on May 27, 2018. On November 27, 2021, the couple announced they were expecting their first child, a boy, due in May 2022. She gave birth to Finn James McManus on May 16, 2022.

== Programs ==
(with Lorello)

Season	Short dance	Free dance
2011–2012	Cuando Pienso En Ti by José Feliciano; Tequila by The Champs	Les Misérables by Claude-Michel Schönberg
2010–2011	Piano Man by Billy Joel	West Side Story by Leonard Bernstein
	Original dance	
2009–2010	Kapoe by Chuck Jonkey	Hernando's Hideaway performed by Ella Fitzgerald; Hernando's Hideaway performed by Harry Connick Jr.
2008–2009	In the Mood performed by The Puppini Sisters; Boogie Woogie Bugle Boy performed by Bette Midler	The Godfather performed by Edvin Marton
2007–2008	Zulu chants	Jive (from Edward Scissorhands)

== Competitive highlights ==
GP: Grand Prix; JGP: Junior Grand Prix

=== With Bramante ===
Event	2012–13	2013–14
U.S. Championships	9th	11th

=== With Lorello ===
International
Event	07–08	08–09	09–10	10–11	11–12
GP Bompard				7th	
GP Cup of China				10th	
GP Skate America					7th
Ice Challenge					2nd
International: Junior
JGP Final			6th		
JGP Belarus		4th			
JGP Bulgaria	8th				
JGP Italy		5th			
JGP Poland			3rd		
JGP Turkey			3rd		
National
U.S. Champ.	9th J	5th J	4th J	6th	9th
Levels: N = Novice; J = Junior
