= 2012–13 ISU Junior Grand Prix =

Figure skating competition

- Type: ISU Junior Grand Prix
- Date: August 22 – December 9, 2012
- Season: 2012–13
- Location: (France) Courchevel (United States) Lake Placid (Austria) Linz (Turkey) Istanbul (Slovenia) Bled (Croatia) Zagreb (Germany) Chemnitz (Russia) Sochi
- Previous: 2011–12 ISU Junior Grand Prix
- Next: 2013–14 ISU Junior Grand Prix

The 2012–13 ISU Junior Grand Prix was the 16th season of the series of junior international competitions organized by the International Skating Union. It was the junior-level complement to the 2012–13 ISU Grand Prix of Figure Skating contested by senior-level skaters. Skaters competed in the disciplines of men's singles, ladies' singles, pair skating, and ice dance.

Skaters earned points toward qualifying for the final at each of the seven Junior Grand Prix events. The top six skaters or teams from each discipline met at the 2012–13 Junior Grand Prix Final, which was held concurrently with the senior final.

== Competitions ==
The locations of the JGP events change yearly. In the 2012–13 season, the series was composed of the following events in autumn 2012:

Date	Event	Location	Details	Other notes
August 23–25	2012 JGP Courchevel	Courchevel, France	Results, Details	No pairs
August 30 – Sept. 1	2012 JGP Lake Placid	Lake Placid, USA	Results, Details	
September 13–15	2012 JGP Austria	Linz, Austria	Results, Details	
September 22–24	2012 JGP Bosphorus	Istanbul, Turkey	Results, Details	No pairs
September 27–29	2012 JGP Sencila Bled Cup	Bled, Slovenia	Results, Details	No pairs
October 4–6	2012 JGP Croatia Cup	Zagreb, Croatia	Results, Details	
October 11–13	2012 JGP Pokal der Blauen Schwerter	Chemnitz, Germany	Results, Details	Venue changed from Dresden on 2 August 2012.
December 6–9	2012–13 Junior Grand Prix Final	Sochi, Russia	Results, Details	Held with senior GPF

== Qualifying ==
Skaters who reached the age of 13 by July 1, 2012 but had not turned 19 (singles and females of the other two disciplines) or 21 (male pair skaters and ice dancers) were eligible to compete on the junior circuit. Unlike the senior Grand Prix, skaters for the JGP are not seeded by the ISU. The number of entries allotted to each ISU member federation is determined by their skaters' placements at the previous season's Junior World Championships in each respective discipline.

A possibility for pairs to compete on both the junior and senior Grand Prix series in the same season was removed before the 2012–2013 season.

== Overview ==
ISU abbreviations: Jumps
T	Toe loop
S	Salchow
Lo	Loop
F	Flip
Lz	Lutz
A	Axel

=== Series ===
The 2012–2013 ISU Junior Grand Prix season began in August 2012 in Courchevel, France. Russia's Elena Radionova and China's Jin Boyang, both making their JGP debut, won gold in the ladies' and men's event respectively, while France's Gabriella Papadakis / Guillaume Cizeron won gold in ice dance.

The next event was held in Lake Placid, USA. Joshua Farris of the United States won his fourth JGP title, while Japan's Satoko Miyahara, Canadian pair Margaret Purdy / Michael Marinaro, and American ice dancers Alexandra Aldridge / Daniel Eaton all recorded their first wins on the circuit.

The series then moved to Linz, Austria, where Radionova and Papadakis / Cizeron took their second titles and qualified for the JGP Final. Making their debuts, Nathan Chen of the United States and Brittany Jones / Ian Beharry of Canada won gold in the men's and pairs' events respectively.

The next event was held in Istanbul, Turkey, where reigning JGP Final champion Jason Brown won his second JGP title and qualified for his second final. This made it three for four for the American men and golds. Leah Keiser of the United States won gold in the ladies' event in her first JGP event. Satoko Miyahara of Japan won the bronze and qualified for the JGP Final. Alexandra Stepanova / Ivan Bukin won the ice dance event, winning their fifth JGP title.

Bled, Slovenia hosted the next event. Americans Joshua Farris and Aldridge / Eaton picked up their second wins of the season and qualified for the JGP Final, ahead of the silver medalists by 24 and 9 points respectively, while South Korea's Kim Hae-jin took her first JGP title.

The Junior Grand Prix series continued in Zagreb, Croatia. Canada's Purdy and Marinaro won their second title and qualified for the Final. In the free skate, fourth-place finishers Kamilla Gainetdinova / Ivan Bich became the first pair to land a side-by-side 3Lz+2T combination in a junior competition. Russia's Maxim Kovtun won the men's event. Russians Valeria Zenkova / Valerie Sinitsin and American Angela Wang won their first JGP titles, in ice dance and ladies' singles respectively. Nathan Chen, who had earlier won the Austrian event, withdrew due to a lower leg injury and thus did not qualify for the Final.

The final qualifying event was held in Chemnitz, Germany. Russians won all four disciplines – Anna Pogorilaya and Lina Fedorova / Maxim Miroshkin won their first JGP titles, while Alexandra Stepanova / Ivan Bukin won their sixth and Maxim Kovtun his third. All qualified for the JGP Final in Sochi.

=== Final ===
Russia swept all four gold medals at the JGP Final and the entire pairs' podium.

The United States' Joshua Farris won the men's short program ahead of Russia's Maxim Kovtun and the 2011 JGP Final champion Jason Brown. Kovtun won the free skate with a program that included a 4T-3T, 3A+3T, and 3A. He won the title by 11 points over the silver medalist, Farris, while Japan's Ryuju Hino moved ahead of Brown to take the bronze.

Russia's Elena Radionova was first in the ladies' short program, with the United States' Hannah Miller in second and Russia's Anna Pogorilaya in third. Radionova also placed first in the free skate and won the junior ladies' title by 11 points ahead of silver medalist Miller, who placed fourth in the segment, and bronze medalist Pogorilaya. Angela Wang of the United States was second in the free skate but remained in fourth overall.

Russia's Lina Fedorova / Maxim Miroshkin took the lead in the pair's short program, followed by Canada's Margaret Purdy / Michael Marinaro and Russia's Vasilisa Davankova / Andrei Deputat. Fedorova / Miroshkin were also first in the free skate and won gold with a total score slightly over five points ahead of the silver medalists, Davankova / Deputat, while Maria Vigalova / Egor Zakroev rose to take the bronze, producing a Russian sweep of the podium. Davankova / Deputat were the only junior pairs' medalists to attempt (and complete) side-by-side triple jumps. Vigalova (born 29 June 1999) was the youngest skater at the JGP Final.

Russia's Alexandra Stepanova / Ivan Bukin won the short dance ahead of France's Gabriella Papadakis / Guillaume Cizeron and 2011 JGP Final silver medalists Anna Yanovskaia / Sergey Mozgov. Stepanova / Bukin also placed first in the free dance and won gold by ten points ahead of Papadakis / Cizeron, while the United States' Alexandra Aldridge / Daniel Eaton moved past Yanovskaia / Mozgov to take the bronze.

== Medalists ==
=== Men ===
Competition	Gold	Silver	Bronze	Details
JGP France	(China) Jin Boyang	(United States) Jason Brown	(Japan) Ryuju Hino	Details
JGP United States	(United States) Joshua Farris	(Japan) Keiji Tanaka	(Canada) Roman Sadovsky	Details
JGP Austria	(United States) Nathan Chen	(Japan) Ryuju Hino	(South Korea) Kim Jin-seo	Details
JGP Turkey	(United States) Jason Brown	(Russia) Alexander Petrov	(Canada) Nam Nguyen	Details
JGP Slovenia	(United States) Joshua Farris	(China) Jin Boyang	(Russia) Alexander Samarin	Details
JGP Croatia	(Russia) Maxim Kovtun	(China) Yan Han	(United States) Harrison Choate	Details
JGP Germany	(Russia) Maxim Kovtun	(Japan) Shoma Uno	(Russia) Alexander Samarin	Details
JGP Final	(Russia) Maxim Kovtun	(United States) Joshua Farris	(Japan) Ryuju Hino	Details

=== Ladies ===
Competition	Gold	Silver	Bronze	Details
JGP France	(Russia) Elena Radionova	(Japan) Rika Hongo	(Russia) Uliana Titushkina	Details
JGP United States	(Japan) Satoko Miyahara	(United States) Courtney Hicks	(United States) Angela Wang	Details
JGP Austria	(Russia) Elena Radionova	(United States) Hannah Miller	(United States) Samantha Cesario	Details
JGP Turkey	(United States) Leah Keiser	(South Korea) Park So-youn	(Japan) Satoko Miyahara	Details
JGP Slovenia	(South Korea) Kim Hae-jin	(United States) Barbie Long	(Russia) Evgenia Gerasimova	Details
JGP Croatia	(United States) Angela Wang	(United States) Hannah Miller	(Russia) Anna Pogorilaya	Details
JGP Germany	(Russia) Anna Pogorilaya	(Japan) Miyabi Oba	(Russia) Maria Stavitskaia	Details
JGP Final	(Russia) Elena Radionova	(United States) Hannah Miller	(Russia) Anna Pogorilaya	Details

=== Pairs ===
Competition	Gold	Silver	Bronze	Details
JGP United States	(Canada) Margaret Purdy / Michael Marinaro	(Russia) Vasilisa Davankova / Andrei Deputat	(United States) Madeline Aaron / Max Settlage	Details
JGP Austria	(Canada) Brittany Jones / Ian Beharry	(Russia) Lina Fedorova / Maxim Miroshkin	(Russia) Maria Vigalova / Egor Zakroev	Details
JGP Croatia	(Canada) Margaret Purdy / Michael Marinaro	(China) Yu Xiaoyu / Jin Yang	(Russia) Vasilisa Davankova / Andrei Deputat	Details
JGP Germany	(Russia) Lina Fedorova / Maxim Miroshkin	(Russia) Maria Vigalova / Egor Zakroev	(Canada) Brittany Jones / Ian Beharry	Details
JGP Final	(Russia) Lina Fedorova / Maxim Miroshkin	(Russia) Vasilisa Davankova / Andrei Deputat	(Russia) Maria Vigalova / Egor Zakroev	Details

=== Ice dance ===
Competition	Gold	Silver	Bronze	Details
JGP France	(France) Gabriella Papadakis / Guillaume Cizeron	(Russia) Valeria Zenkova / Valerie Sinitsin	(Canada) Madeline Edwards / Zhao Kai Pang	Details
JGP United States	(United States) Alexandra Aldridge / Daniel Eaton	(Russia) Evgenia Kosigina / Nikolai Moroshkin	(Canada) Andréanne Poulin / Marc-André Servant	Details
JGP Austria	(France) Gabriella Papadakis / Guillaume Cizeron	(Russia) Anna Yanovskaia / Sergey Mozgov	(Canada) Mackenzie Bent / Garrett MacKeen	Details
JGP Turkey	(Russia) Alexandra Stepanova / Ivan Bukin	(Germany) Shari Koch / Christian Nüchtern	(Canada) Madeline Edwards / Zhao Kai Pang	Details
JGP Slovenia	(United States) Alexandra Aldridge / Daniel Eaton	(Russia) Anna Yanovskaia / Sergey Mozgov	(Canada) Andréanne Poulin / Marc-André Servant	Details
JGP Croatia	(Russia) Valeria Zenkova / Valerie Sinitsin	(Russia) Evgenia Kosigina / Nikolai Moroshkin	(United States) Rachel Parsons / Michael Parsons	Details
JGP Germany	(Russia) Alexandra Stepanova / Ivan Bukin	(United States) Kaitlin Hawayek / Jean-Luc Baker	(Russia) Daria Morozova / Mikhail Zhirnov	Details
JGP Final	(Russia) Alexandra Stepanova / Ivan Bukin	(France) Gabriella Papadakis / Guillaume Cizeron	(United States) Alexandra Aldridge / Daniel Eaton	Details

== Medals table ==
Rank	Nation	Gold	Silver	Bronze	Total
1	Russia (RUS)	13	10	11	34
2	United States (USA)	8	8	6	22
3	Canada (CAN)	3	0	8	11
4	France (FRA)	2	1	0	3
5	Japan (JPN)	1	5	3	9
6	China (CHN)	1	3	0	4
7	South Korea (KOR)	1	1	1	3
8	Germany (GER)	0	1	0	1
Totals (8 entries)		29	29	29	87

== Junior Grand Prix Final qualification and qualifiers ==
=== Qualification rules ===
At each event, skaters earn points toward qualification for the Junior Grand Prix Final. Following the 7th event, the top six highest scoring skaters/teams advance to the Final. The points earned per placement are as follows:

Placement	Points (Singles/Dance)	Points (Pairs)
1st	15	15
2nd	13	13
3rd	11	11
4th	9	9
5th	7	7
6th	5	5
7th	4	4
8th	3	3
9th	2	–
10th	1	–

There are seven tie-breakers in cases of a tie in overall points:

1. Highest placement at an event. If a skater placed 1st and 3rd, the tiebreaker is the 1st place, and that beats a skater who placed 2nd in both events.
2. Highest combined total scores in both events. If a skater earned 200 points at one event and 250 at a second, that skater would win in the second tie-break over a skater who earned 200 points at one event and 150 at another.
3. Participated in two events.
4. Highest combined scores in the free skating/free dance portion of both events.
5. Highest individual score in the free skating/free dance portion from one event.
6. Highest combined scores in the short program/short dance of both events.
7. Highest number of total participants at the events.

If there is still a tie, the tie is considered unbreakable and the tied skaters all advance to the Junior Grand Prix Final.

=== Qualifiers ===
	Men	Ladies	Pairs	Ice dance
1	(United States) Joshua Farris	(Russia) Elena Radionova	(Canada) Margaret Purdy / Michael Marinaro	(Russia) Alexandra Stepanova / Ivan Bukin
2	(Russia) Maxim Kovtun	(United States) Angela Wang	(Russia) Lina Fedorova / Maxim Miroshkin	(United States) Alexandra Aldridge / Daniel Eaton
3	(United States) Jason Brown	(Russia) Anna Pogorilaya	(Canada) Brittany Jones / Ian Beharry	(France) Gabriella Papadakis / Guillaume Cizeron
4	(China) Jin Boyang	(Japan) Satoko Miyahara	(Russia) Maria Vigalova / Egor Zakroev	(Russia) Valeria Zenkova / Valerie Sinitsin
5	(Japan) Ryuju Hino	(United States) Hannah Miller	(Russia) Vasilisa Davankova / Andrei Deputat	(Russia) Evgenia Kosigina / Nikolai Moroshkin
6	(Japan) Keiji Tanaka	(United States) Leah Keiser	(China) Yu Xiaoyu / Jin Yang	(Russia) Anna Yanovskaia / Sergey Mozgov
Alternates
1st	(Russia) Alexander Samarin	(South Korea) Kim Hae-jin	(United States) Madeline Aaron / Max Settlage	(Germany) Shari Koch / Christian Nüchtern
2nd	(China) Yan Han	(United States) Courtney Hicks	(Germany) Annabelle Prölss / Ruben Blommaert	(Canada) Madeline Edwards / Zhao Kai Pang
3rd	(Russia) Alexander Petrov	(Japan) Miyabi Oba	(United States) Britney Simpson / Matthew Blackmer	(Canada) Andreanne Poulin / Marc-Andre Servant

== Top JGP scores ==
Top scores attained in Junior Grand Prix competitions.

=== Men ===
Rank	Name	Nation	Score	Event
1	Maxim Kovtun	Russia	222.31	2012–13 JGP Final
2	Nathan Chen	United States	222.00	2012 JGP Austria
3	Joshua Farris	United States	218.69	2012 JGP United States
4	Han Yan	China	212.10	2012 JGP Croatia
5	Ryuju Hino	Japan	198.92	2012–13 JGP Final
6	Jason Brown	United States	198.32	2012–13 JGP Final
7	Boyang Jin	China	194.13	2012 JGP France
8	Shoma Uno	Japan	188.48	2012 JGP Germany
9	Harrison Choate	United States	185.39	2012 JGP Croatia
10	Alexander Samarin	Russia	183.03	2012 JGP Slovenia

=== Ladies ===
Rank	Name	Nation	Score	Event
1	Elena Radionova	Russia	182.86	2012 JGP Austria
2	Hannah Miller	United States	168.41	2012–13 JGP Final
3	Anna Pogorilaya	Russia	167.40	2012–13 JGP Final
4	Angela Wang	United States	162.65	2012 JGP Croatia
5	Satoko Miyahara	Japan	161.65	2012 JGP United States
6	Samantha Cesario	United States	157.72	2012 JGP Austria
7	Leah Keiser	United States	156.33	2012 JGP Turkey
8	Courtney Hicks	United States	153.77	2012 JGP United States
9	Rika Hongo	Japan	149.38	2012 JGP France
10	Kim Hae-jin	South Korea	147.30	2012 JGP Slovenia

=== Pairs ===
Rank	Name	Nation	Score	Event
1	Lina Fedorova / Maxim Miroshkin	Russia	161.11	2012–13 JGP Final
2	Vasilisa Davankova / Andrei Deputat	Russia	155.96	2012–13 JGP Final
3	Maria Vigalova / Egor Zakroev	Russia	153.56	2012–13 JGP Final
4	Brittany Jones / Ian Beharry	Canada	152.78	2012 JGP Austria
5	Margaret Purdy / Michael Marinaro	Canada	149.94	2012–13 JGP Final
6	Yu Xiaoyu / Jin Yang	China	149.20	2012–13 JGP Final
7	Kamilla Gainetdinova / Ivan Bich	Russia	142.26	2012 JGP Croatia
8	Evgenia Tarasova / Vladimir Morozov	Russia	137.29	2012 JGP Croatia
9	Annabelle Prölß / Ruben Blommaert	Germany	133.48	2012 JGP Germany
10	Britney Simpson / Matthew Blackmer	United States	133.05	2012 JGP Austria

=== Ice dance ===
Rank	Name	Nation	Score	Event
1	Alexandra Stepanova / Ivan Bukin	Russia	149.57	2012–13 JGP Final
2	Gabriella Papadakis / Guillaume Cizeron	France	142.08	2012 JGP Austria
3	Kaitlin Hawayek / Jean-Luc Baker	United States	138.61	2012 JGP Germany
4	Alexandra Aldridge / Daniel Eaton	United States	138.43	2012 JGP Slovenia
5	Shari Koch / Christian Nüchtern	Germany	136.21	2012 JGP Turkey
6	Evgenia Kosigina / Nikolai Moroshkin	Russia	135.24	2012 JGP United States
7	Anna Yanovskaia / Sergey Mozgov	Russia	135.02	2012 JGP Austria
8	Madeline Edwards / Zhao Kai Pang	Canada	135.01	2012 JGP Turkey
9	Valeria Zenkova / Valerie Sinitsin	Russia	134.63	2012 JGP Croatia
10	Rachel Parsons / Michael Parsons	United States	134.09	2012 JGP Croatia
