= 2013 U.S. Figure Skating Championships =

Figure skating competition

- Type: National Championship
- Date: January 20 – 27
- Season: 2012–13
- Location: Omaha, Nebraska
- Venue: CenturyLink Center Omaha

Champions
- Men's singles: Max Aaron (S); Vincent Zhou (J)
- Women's singles: Ashley Wagner (S); Polina Edmunds (J)
- Pairs: Marissa Castelli / Simon Shnapir (S); Britney Simpson / Matthew Blackmer (J)
- Ice dance: Meryl Davis / Charlie White (S); Alexandra Aldridge / Daniel Eaton (J)
- Previous: 2012 U.S. Championships
- Next: 2014 U.S. Championships

The 2013 U.S. Figure Skating Championships was the national figure skating championships of the United States for the 2012–13 season.

The event was held at the CenturyLink Center Omaha in Omaha, Nebraska on January 19–27, 2013. Medals were awarded in the disciplines of men's singles, ladies' singles, pair skating, and ice dancing at the senior, junior and novice levels. For the first time, the event was expanded to include juvenile and intermediate level competitions, previously held at a separate event. The results are part of the U.S. selection criteria for the 2013 World Junior Championships, 2013 Four Continents Championships and 2013 World Championships.

== Overview ==
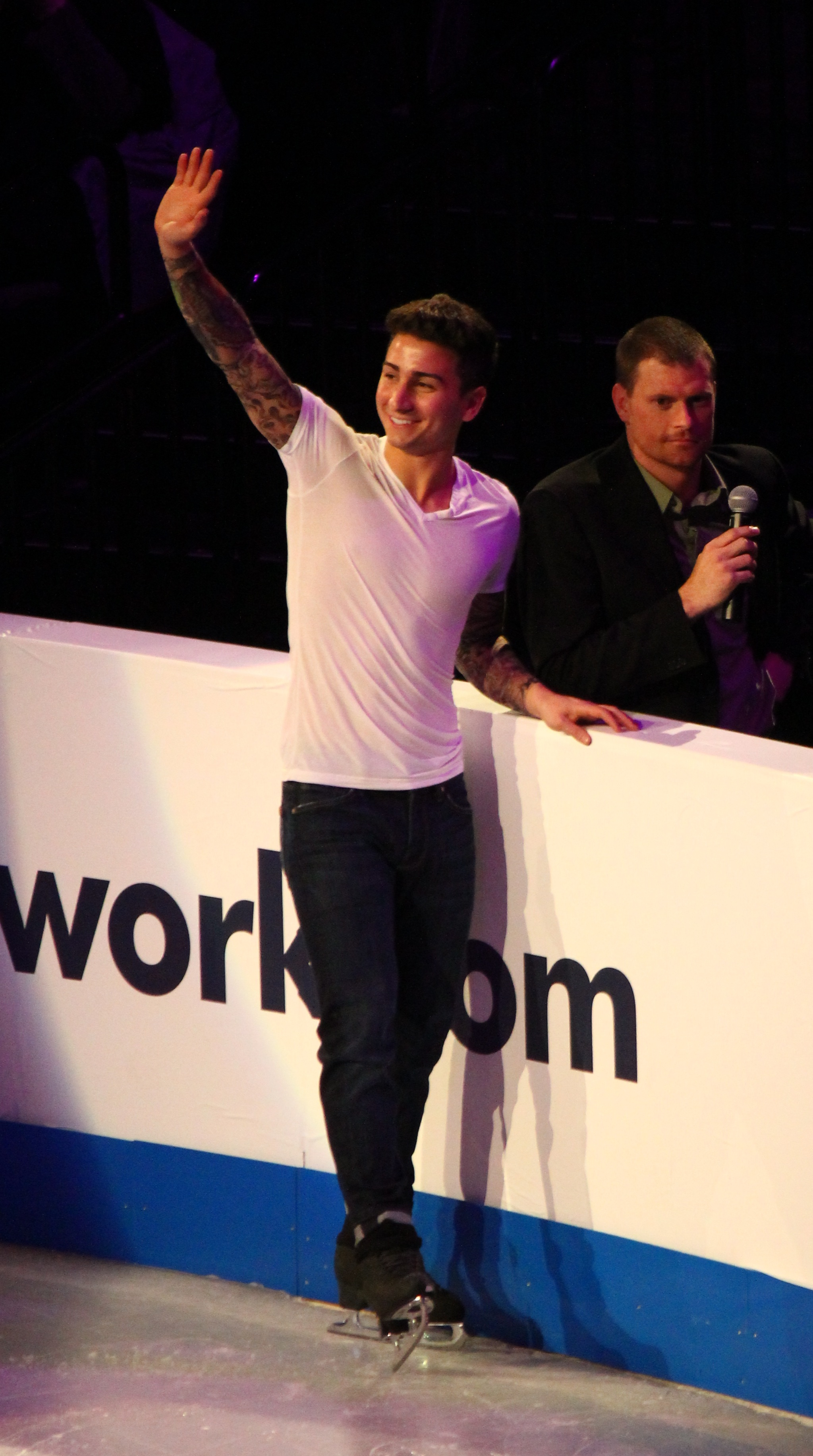
Max Aaron

The 2013 event was the second time that Omaha hosted the U.S. Championships. Competitors qualified at the Eastern, Midwestern, or Pacific Coast Sectional Championships or earned a bye.

Defending champion Jeremy Abbott won the men's short program, with Ross Miner in second and Joshua Farris in third. Max Aaron placed first in the free skate, Miner was second, and Abbott third. Aaron won gold, his first senior national medal, Miner took silver, Abbott the bronze, and Farris the pewter medal.

Defending champion Ashley Wagner was first in the ladies' short program, followed by Agnes Zawadzki and Mirai Nagasu. Gracie Gold won the long program and rose from 9th to claim the silver medal, while Wagner was second in the segment but first overall and won her second national title. Bronze medalist Zawadzki's combined score kept her on the podium and Courtney Hicks took the pewter medal.

None of the top three partnerships from 2012 competed in the pairs event, Denney / Coughlin being absent due to Coughlin's surgery and the other two pairs having split. Longtime pair Marissa Castelli / Simon Shnapir won the short program ahead of relatively new teams Felicia Zhang / Nathan Bartholomay and Alexa Scimeca / Christopher Knierim. Castelli / Shnapir were third in the free skate but remained first in the overall standings and took their first national title, while silver went to Scimeca / Knierim and bronze to Zhang / Bartholomay.

Defending champions Meryl Davis / Charlie White were first in the short dance ahead of Madison Chock / Evan Bates and Maia Shibutani / Alex Shibutani. The standings were the same in the free dance. Davis / White won their fifth national title, Chock / Bates took silver, their first time on the podium as a team, the Shibutanis settled for bronze, and Madison Hubbell / Zachary Donohue took the pewter medal.

Vincent Zhou, Shotaro Omori, Nathan Chen, and Jimmy Ma were the medalists in the junior men's event. Polina Edmunds, Mariah Bell, Barbie Long, and Karen Chen were the junior ladies' medalists. Britney Simpson / Matthew Blackmer, Jessica Calalang / Zack Sidhu, Madeline Aaron / Max Settlage, and Chelsea Liu / Devin Perini were the junior pairs' medalists. Alexandra Aldridge / Daniel Eaton, Kaitlin Hawayek / Jean-Luc Baker, Lorraine McNamara / Quinn Carpenter, and Holly Moore / Daniel Klaber were the medalists in the junior ice dancing event.

Attendance was 90,760.

== Senior results ==
=== Senior men ===
Rank	Name	Total points	SP		FS	
1	Max Aaron	255.00	4	79.13	1	175.87
2	Ross Miner	251.29	2	80.99	2	170.30
3	Jeremy Abbott	249.33	1	84.10	3	165.23
4	Joshua Farris	244.82	3	79.78	4	165.04
5	Adam Rippon	229.87	6	76.65	6	153.22
6	Richard Dornbush	228.81	5	77.66	7	151.15
7	Alexander Johnson	224.49	12	65.20	5	159.29
8	Jason Brown	223.29	7	74.05	8	149.24
9	Brandon Mroz	202.42	10	66.06	10	136.36
10	Stephen Carriere	201.30	17	62.77	9	138.53
11	Jonathan Cassar	196.49	8	67.03	14	129.46
12	Douglas Razzano	192.99	14	63.31	13	129.68
13	Armin Mahbanoozadeh	192.77	16	62.85	12	129.92
14	Wesley Campbell	191.75	20	57.24	11	134.51
15	Grant Hochstein	188.57	11	65.68	17	122.89
16	Keegan Messing	187.34	13	64.06	16	123.28
17	Harrison Choate	187.11	19	57.66	15	129.45
18	Philip Warren	183.27	9	66.48	19	116.79
19	Sean Rabbitt	181.66	15	62.87	18	118.79
20	William Brewster	170.13	18	58.62	20	111.51

=== Senior ladies ===
Rank	Name	Total points	SP		FS	
1	Ashley Wagner	188.84	1	67.57	2	121.27
2	Gracie Gold	186.57	9	54.08	1	132.49
3	Agnes Zawadzki	179.63	2	65.31	7	114.32
4	Courtney Hicks	177.92	4	59.72	3	118.20
5	Christina Gao	176.28	5	58.74	4	117.54
6	Yasmin Siraj	175.07	6	57.88	5	117.19
7	Mirai Nagasu	173.75	3	64.39	11	109.36
8	Samantha Cesario	170.15	7	55.74	6	114.41
9	Angela Wang	164.76	10	52.06	8	112.70
10	Hannah Miller	164.68	8	54.47	10	110.21
11	Caroline Zhang	161.89	12	49.99	9	111.90
12	Ashley Cain	150.79	11	50.83	12	99.96
13	Kiri Baga	138.14	13	46.66	13	91.48
14	Haley Dunne	127.73	15	44.96	15	82.77
15	Joelle Forte	124.95	14	45.82	16	79.13
16	Becky Bereswill	123.57	17	38.46	14	85.11
17	Amanda Hofmann	119.14	16	42.25	17	76.89
18	Morgan Bell	107.65	18	37.78	20	69.87
19	Sophia Adams	107.50	19	37.54	19	69.96
20	Laney Diggs	102.80	20	28.57	18	74.23

=== Senior pairs ===
Rank	Name	Total points	SP		FS	
1	Marissa Castelli / Simon Shnapir	180.61	1	62.27	3	118.34
2	Alexa Scimeca / Christopher Knierim	172.75	3	52.79	1	119.96
3	Felicia Zhang / Nathan Bartholomay	172.02	2	53.19	2	118.83
4	Lindsay Davis / Mark Ladwig	165.08	5	51.65	4	113.43
5	Haven Denney / Brandon Frazier	162.27	4	52.48	6	109.79
6	Gretchen Donlan / Andrew Speroff	159.67	7	49.81	5	109.86
7	Tarah Kayne / Daniel O'Shea	148.32	9	47.74	7	100.58
8	Kiri Baga / Taylor Toth	148.08	8	48.13	8	99.95
9	DeeDee Leng / Timothy LeDuc	143.71	6	50.84	10	92.87
10	Tiffany Vise / Don Baldwin	143.35	10	44.41	9	98.94

=== Senior ice dancing ===
Rank	Name	Total points	SD		FD	
1	Meryl Davis / Charlie White	197.44	1	79.02	1	118.42
2	Madison Chock / Evan Bates	175.91	2	70.80	2	105.11
3	Maia Shibutani / Alex Shibutani	174.21	3	69.63	3	104.58
4	Madison Hubbell / Zachary Donohue	167.86	4	67.75	4	100.11
5	Lynn Kriengkrairut / Logan Giulietti-Schmitt	160.01	5	64.69	5	95.32
6	Anastasia Cannuscio / Colin McManus	142.32	6	56.33	6	85.99
7	Anastasia Olson / Keiffer Hubbell	130.67	7	54.68	9	75.99
8	Alissandra Aronow / Collin Brubaker	130.55	9	50.35	7	80.20
9	Isabella Cannuscio / Michael Bramante	129.08	8	52.51	8	76.57
10	Ginna Hoptman / Pavel Filchenkov	119.77	10	47.03	10	72.74
11	Danielle Gamelin / Alexander Gamelin	113.34	11	45.76	12	67.58
12	Kristen Nardozzi / Nick Traxler	113.18	12	41.87	11	71.31
13	Taylor Tran / Sam Kaplun	106.09	13	39.51	13	66.58
14	Kseniya Ponomaryova / Oleg Altukhov	78.03	14	30.06	14	47.97
15	Katie Donaldson / Brock Jacobs	62.34	15	23.72	15	38.62

== Junior results ==
=== Junior men ===
Rank	Name	Total points	SP		FS	
1	Vincent Zhou	205.26	2	66.31	1	138.95
2	Shotaro Omori	189.25	1	69.87	2	119.38
3	Nathan Chen	181.31	3	63.60	4	117.71
4	Jimmy Ma	176.09	4	57.88	3	118.21
5	Jordan Moeller	161.02	5	57.21	7	103.81
6	Jay Yostanto	159.25	6	55.05	6	104.20
7	Nix Phengsy	152.73	9	51.30	8	101.43
8	Brian Krentz	151.44	10	50.90	9	100.54
9	Marcus Mimdis	150.11	11	45.85	5	104.26
10	Troy Tomasello	147.11	7	53.77	10	93.34
11	Lukas Kaugars	145.20	8	53.04	11	92.16
12	James Schetelich	122.64	12	43.14	12	79.50

=== Junior ladies ===
Rank	Name	Total points	SP		FS	
1	Polina Edmunds	159.87	1	58.17	1	101.70
2	Mariah Bell	152.80	2	56.63	3	96.17
3	Barbie Long	152.53	4	51.05	2	101.48
4	Karen Chen	144.56	3	54.34	4	90.22
5	Amber Glenn	131.70	7	45.28	6	86.42
6	Madison Vinci	131.64	11	42.82	5	88.82
7	Dyllan McIntee	116.03	10	43.19	8	72.84
8	Brianna Laxson	115.29	12	40.89	7	74.40
9	Maria Yang	115.00	5	48.75	10	66.25
10	Olivia Serafini	114.85	8	44.15	9	70.70
11	Amanda Gelb	107.04	9	43.65	11	63.39
12	Katia Shpilband	102.28	6	46.04	12	56.24

=== Junior pairs ===
Rank	Name	Total points	SP		FS	
1	Britney Simpson / Matthew Blackmer	146.44	2	50.25	1	96.19
2	Jessica Calalang / Zack Sidhu	141.52	3	48.32	2	93.20
3	Madeline Aaron / Max Settlage	138.41	1	52.94	4	85.47
4	Chelsea Liu / Devin Perini	138.31	4	47.20	3	91.11
5	Briana de la Mora / Taylor Wilson	120.84	6	42.31	6	78.53
6	Jessica Pfund / AJ Reiss	120.81	7	40.93	5	79.88
7	Caitlin Fields / Jason Pacini	116.43	5	43.79	11	72.64
8	Cali Fujimoto / Nicholas Barsi-Rhyne	115.49	8	38.61	7	76.88
9	Caitlin Belt / Michael Johnson	111.95	9	38.02	9	73.93
10	Alexandria Shaughnessy / James Morgan	110.68	10	37.45	10	73.23
11	Olivia Oltmanns / Joshua Santillan	110.25	11	35.19	8	75.06
12	Brenna Doherty / Craig Norris	95.16	12	26.40	12	68.76

=== Junior ice dancing ===
Rank	Name	Total points	SD		FD	
1	Alexandra Aldridge / Daniel Eaton	159.85	1	66.11	1	93.74
2	Kaitlin Hawayek / Jean-Luc Baker	149.74	3	60.72	2	89.02
3	Lorraine McNamara / Quinn Carpenter	149.25	2	63.67	3	85.58
4	Holly Moore / Daniel Klaber	141.23	4	58.39	4	82.94
5	Elliana Pogrebinsky / Ross Gudis	127.77	5	54.28	5	73.49
6	Whitney Miller / Kyle MacMillian	112.82	6	45.72	6	67.10
7	Madeline Heritage / Nathaniel Fast	106.47	8	42.98	7	63.49
8	Hannah Rosinski / Jacob Jaffe	104.86	7	43.72	8	61.14
9	Julia Biechler / Damian Dodge	95.90	9	41.19	12	54.71
10	MacKenzie Reed / Christian Erwin	94.98	10	37.14	9	57.84
11	Yura Min / Igor Ogay	89.63	12	32.45	10	57.18
12	Stacey Siddon / Jared Weiss	86.33	11	34.23	11	55.10

== International assignments ==
U.S. Figure Skating announced international assignments on January 27, 2013.

=== Four Continents Championships ===
	Men	Ladies	Pairs	Ice dancing
1	Max Aaron	Christina Gao	Marissa Castelli / Simon Shnapir	Madison Chock / Evan Bates
2	Ross Miner	Gracie Gold	Alexa Scimeca / Christopher Knierim	Meryl Davis / Charlie White
3	Adam Rippon	Agnes Zawadzki	Felicia Zhang / Nathan Bartholomay	Maia Shibutani / Alex Shibutani
1st alt.	Richard Dornbush	Mirai Nagasu	Lindsay Davis / Mark Ladwig	Madison Hubbell / Zachary Donohue
2nd alt.	Brandon Mroz	Caroline Zhang	Gretchen Donlan / Andrew Speroff	Lynn Kriengkrairut / Logan Giulietti-Schmitt
3rd alt.	Stephen Carriere	Ashley Cain	Haven Denney / Brandon Frazier	Anastasia Cannuscio / Colin McManus

=== World Junior Championships ===
	Men	Ladies	Pairs	Ice dancing
1	Jason Brown	Samantha Cesario	Jessica Calalang / Zack Sidhu	Alexandra Aldridge / Daniel Eaton
2	Joshua Farris	Courtney Hicks	Haven Denney / Brandon Frazier	Kaitlin Hawayek / Jean-Luc Baker
3	Shotaro Omori	Yasmin Siraj	Britney Simpson / Matthew Blackmer	Lorraine McNamara / Quinn Carpenter
1st alt.	Harrison Choate	Angela Wang	Madeline Aaron / Max Settlage	Holly Moore / Daniel Klaber
2nd alt.	Jay Yostanto	Hannah Miller	Jessica Pfund / AJ Reiss	Elliana Pogrebinsky / Ross Gudis
3rd alt.		Leah Keiser		Whitney Miller / Kyle MacMillan

=== World Championships ===
	Men	Ladies	Pairs	Ice dancing
1	Max Aaron	Gracie Gold	Marissa Castelli / Simon Shnapir	Madison Chock / Evan Bates
2	Ross Miner	Ashley Wagner	Caydee Denney / John Coughlin	Meryl Davis / Charlie White
3				Maia Shibutani / Alex Shibutani
1st alt.	Jeremy Abbott	Agnes Zawadzki	Alexa Scimeca / Chris Knierim	Madison Hubbell / Zachary Donohue
2nd alt.	Adam Rippon	Christina Gao	Felicia Zhang / Nathan Bartholomay	Lynn Kriengkrairut / Logan Giulietti-Schmitt
3rd alt.	Joshua Farris	Mirai Nagasu	Lindsay Davis / Mark Ladwig	
