= Dalilah Sappenfield =

American figure skating coach

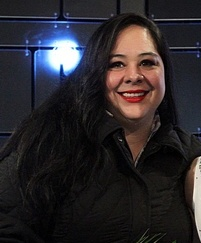
- Dalilah Sappenfield in 2011
- Born: Miami, Florida
- Occupations: figure skating coach and choreographer; specialized in pair skating
- Known for: permanently banned by the United States Center for SafeSport
- Awards: USFSA/PSA Coach of the Year (2008)

Dalilah Sappenfield is an American former figure skating coach and choreographer who specialized in pair skating. She started working as a coach in 1993, and was named the 2008 USFSA/PSA Coach of the Year, after her pair teams won the gold medals at the novice, junior, and senior levels at the 2008 U.S. Figure Skating Championships. Her pair Alexa Scimeca Knierim and Chris Knierim competed at the 2018 Winter Olympics. She is the adoptive mother of Laureano Ibarra, and he and his first partner were her first pair team.

In May 2024, Sappenfield was permanently banned by the United States Center for SafeSport for physical and emotional misconduct, retaliation, abuse of process, and failure to report a potential SafeSport violation.

== Early life ==
Sappenfield was born in Miami, Florida, to Cuban parents. She was the fifth of 10 children. She described it as "a strict, Hispanic family" with "a lot of discipline."

== Coaching career ==
At 19 years of age, Sappenfield switched from skating to coaching. Sappenfield coached in Monument, Colorado at the Monument Ice Rinks. She coached Alexa Scimeca Knierim & Chris Knierim to two U.S. National titles (2015, 2018), Keauna McLaughlin & Rockne Brubaker to two U.S. National titles (2008, 2009), Caydee Denney & John Coughlin to the 2012 National title and Caitlin Yankowskas & John Coughlin to the 2011 National title. She also coached McLaughlin & Brubaker to the 2007 World Junior title and the 2006 Junior Grand Prix Final title. Her pair teams have won several medals on the ISU Grand Prix and the ISU Junior Grand Prix. Additional skaters she has coached include Jessica Rose Paetsch & Jon Nuss, Meeran Trombley & Laureano Ibarra, Brittany Vise & Nicholas Kole, Igor Macypura, and Austin Kanallakan.

U.S. National Champions coached by Sappenfield include:

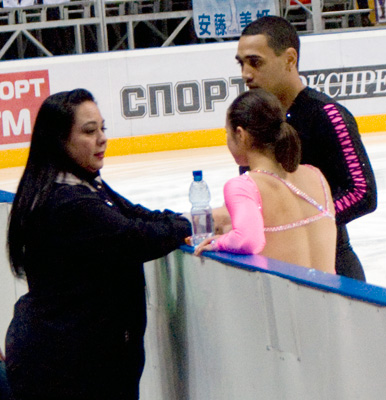
Dalilah Sappenfield (left) with Britney Simpson and Nathan Miller in 2010

- Alexa Scimeca Knierim & Chris Knierim – 2018, 2015
- Caydee Denney & John Coughlin – 2012
- Caitlin Yankowskas & John Coughlin – 2011
- Keauna McLaughlin & Rockne Brubaker – 2009, 2008
- Nica Digerness & Danny Neudecker – 2017 (junior)
- Madeline Aaron & Max Settlage – 2014 (junior)
- Britney Simpson & Matthew Blackmer – 2013 (junior)
- Haven Denney & Brandon Frazier – 2012 (junior)
- Jessica Rose Paetsch & Jon Nuss – 2008 (junior)
- Keauna McLaughlin & Rockne Brubaker – 2007 (junior)
- Mariel Miller & Rockne Brubaker – 2005 (junior)
- Kate Finster & Eric Hartley – 2015 (novice)
- Madeline Aaron & Max Settlage – 2011 (novice)
- Brynn Carman & Chris Knierim – 2008 (novice)
- Jessica Rose Paetsch & Jon Nuss – 2006 (novice)
- Claire Davis & Nathan Miller – 2005 (novice)

== Allegations of abuse; permanent suspension by SafeSport ==
On October 8, 2021, USA Today published an exposé in which former pairs skater Tarah Kayne detailed emotional and psychological abuse she alleged she suffered while being coached by Sappenfield. Kayne ultimately left Sappenfield with her skating partner, Danny O'Shea, in September 2020, before Kayne retired in December that same year. Kayne stated that Sappenfield's abuse prompted her to engage in self-harm behavior, and that she had been afraid to seek mental health treatment out of concern that Sappenfield would find out. She said, "These awful experiences forced me out of the sport I love. Dalilah said multiple times that she wanted to end my career, and she succeeded." O'Shea expressed his support for Kayne on social media. Kayne was one of several skaters to file complaints against Sappenfield with the United States Center for SafeSport, leading to Sappenfield's initial suspension pending further investigation.

In 2021, Sappenfield was banned temporarily by SafeSport from contacting a dozen figure skaters and from coaching athletes without another adult around, during an investigation by Safesport into misconduct allegations against her.

On May 29, 2024, Sappenfield was permanently banned for "physical and emotional misconduct," retaliation, abuse of process, and failure to report a potential SafeSport violation.

== See also ==
- Mauro Hamza (born 1965 or 1966), Egyptian fencing coach; lifetime ban
- Alen Hadzic (born 1991), fencer, lifetime ban
- Ross Miner (born 1991), figure skater and coach
- George H. Morris (born 1938), equestrian and coach; lifetime ban
- Alberto Salazar (born 1958), track coach; lifetime ban
