= Leah Keiser =

American figure skater

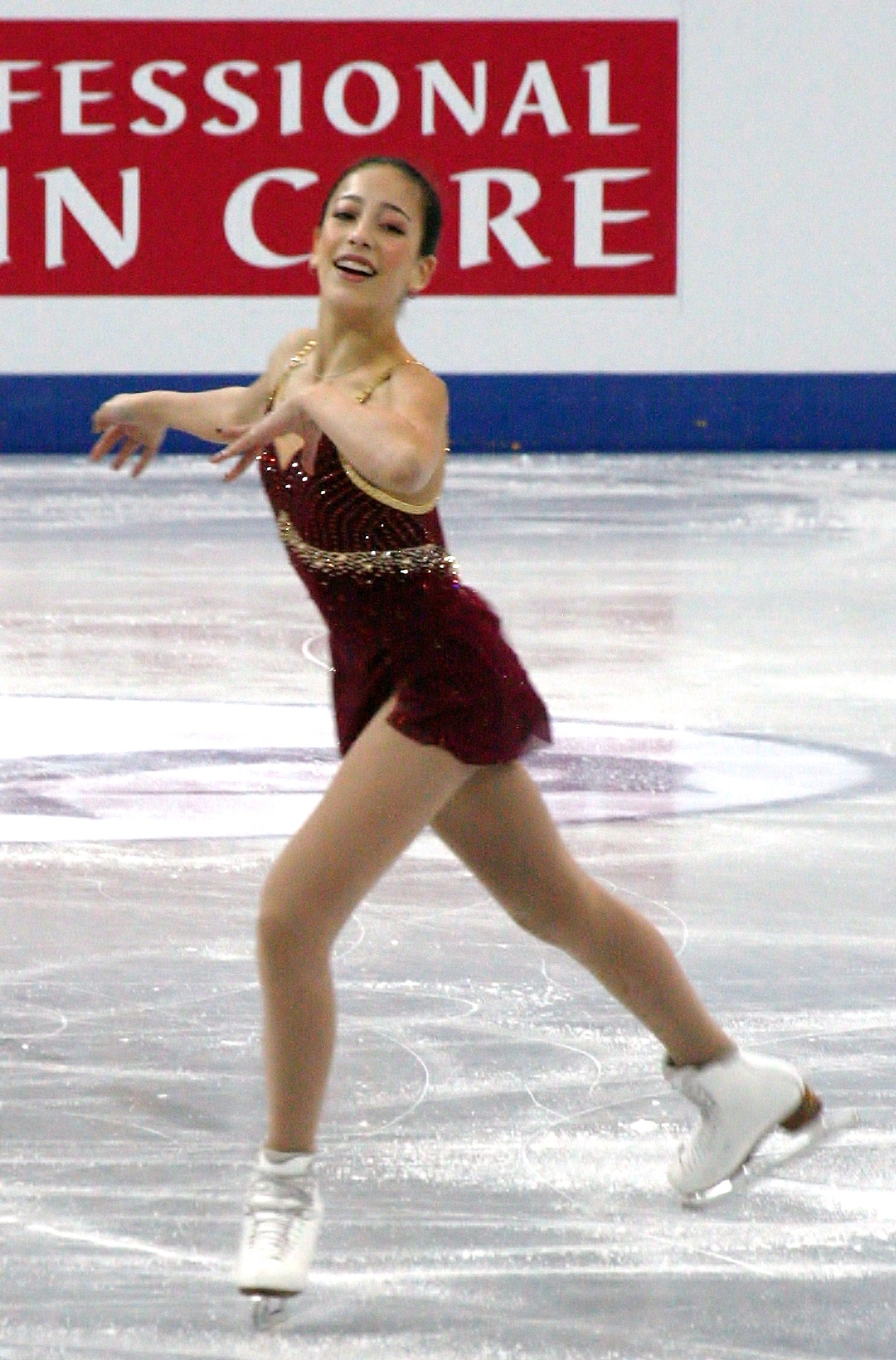
- Keiser in December 2013

Personal information
- Born: September 13, 1997 (age 28) Pittsburgh, Pennsylvania, U.S.
- Home town: Irvine, California, U.S.
- Height: 5 ft 8 in (1.72 m)

Figure skating career
- Country: United States
- Coach: Tammy Gambill
- Skating club: All Year FSC Ontario
- Began skating: 2001

Leah Keiser (born September 13, 1997) is an American former figure skater. She is the 2012 JGP Turkey gold medalist.

== Personal life ==
Leah Keiser was born in Pittsburgh, Pennsylvania. She has a sister, Emily, a half-sister, Stephanie, and two half-brothers, Alex and Thomas, who play in the NFL for the San Diego Chargers. Leah now attends Northwestern University studying chemical engineering with plans to graduate in the spring of 2020.

== Career ==
Keiser debuted on the ISU Junior Grand Prix series in the 2012–13 season. She won gold in Istanbul, Turkey and placed fourth in her next event, in Chemnitz, Germany. She qualified for the JGP Final in Sochi, Russia, where she finished 6th. She withdrew from the 2013 U.S. Championships.

Keiser finished tenth at the 2014 U.S. Championships. During the 2014–15 JGP series, she won a bronze medal in Ljubljana, Slovenia and then competed in Dresden, Germany.

== Programs ==
Season	Short program	Free skating	Exhibition
2014–2015	Clair de Lune by Claude Debussy	Hungarian Dances by Johannes Brahms	
2013–2014	Concierto de Aranjuez by Joaquín Rodrigo	Scheherazade by Nikolai Rimsky-Korsakov	
2012–2013	Intro. and Rondo Capriccioso by Camille Saint-Saëns	Seasons by Alexander Glazunov	
2011–2012	Intro. and Rondo Capriccioso by Camille Saint-Saëns	Dr. Zhivago by Maurice Jarre	
2010–2011	Asturias by Isaac Albéniz	Alexander by Vangelis	
2009–2010	Art On Ice by Edvin Marton	Carmen performed by the British Symphony Orchestra	

== Competitive highlights ==
=== 2009–present ===
International: Junior
Event	09–10	10–11	11–12	12–13	13–14	14–15
JGP Final				6th		
JGP Germany				4th		8th
JGP Slovenia						3rd
JGP Turkey				1st		
Int. Challenge Cup			1st J.			
National
U.S. Champ.	1st N		12th	WD	10th	12th
Pacific Coast	3rd N.	6th J.	1st		3rd	2nd
Southwest Pacific	2nd N.	3rd J.	1st			
WD = Withdrew; Levels: N. = Novice; J. = Junior

=== 2007–2009 ===
National
Event	2007–08	2008–09
U.S. Junior Championships	1st Jv.	
Southwest Pacific Regionals	2nd Jv.	6th I.
Jv. = Juvenile; I. = Intermediate

== Detailed results ==
2014–15 season
Date	Event	Level	SP	FS	Total
November 19–22, 2014	2015 Pacific Coast	Senior	1; 59.57	2; 102.77	2; 162.34
October 1–4, 2014	2014 JGP Germany	Junior	7; 49.66	9; 78.97	8; 128.63
August 27–30, 2014	2014 JGP Slovenia	Junior	8; 47.66	3; 101.58	3; 149.24
2013–14 season
Date	Event	Level	SP	FS	Total
January 5–12, 2014	2014 U.S. Championships	Senior	8; 57.41	9; 102.92	10; 160.33
November 19–23, 2013	2014 Pacific Coast	Senior	1; 56.92	3; 89.71	3; 146.63
2012–13 season
Date	Event	Level	SP	FS	Total
December 6–9, 2012	2012-13 JGP Final	Junior	6; 47.23	6; 90.21	6; 137.44
October 10–13, 2012	2012 JGP Germany	Junior	2; 55.14	7; 86.01	4; 141.15
September 19–22, 2012	2012 JGP Turkey	Junior	3; 50.70	1; 105.63	1; 156.33
2011–12 season
Date	Event	Level	SP	FS	Total
March 8–11, 2012	2012 Challenge Cup	Junior	1; 51.64	1; 93.63	1; 145.27
January 22–29, 2012	2012 U.S. Championships	Senior	10; 52.44	11; 93.11	12; 145.55
