= Britney Simpson =

American pair skater (born 1996)

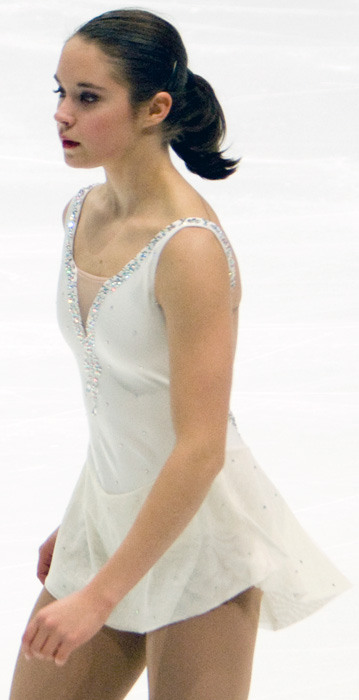
- Simpson in 2010

Personal information
- Born: May 5, 1996 (age 30) Denver, Colorado, U.S.
- Height: 5 ft 3 in (1.60 m)

Figure skating career
- Country: United States
- Partner: Matthew Blackmer
- Coach: Dalilah Sappenfield; Laureano Ibarra
- Skating club: Broadmoor SC
- Began skating: 2001
Medal record
Pairs' figure skating
Representing United States
Junior Grand Prix Final
Bronze medal – third place	2011–2012 Quebec	Pairs

Britney Simpson (born May 5, 1996) is an American pair skater. With current partner Matthew Blackmer, she is the 2011 Junior Grand Prix Final bronze medalist, the 2012 U.S. Junior silver medalist and the 2013 U.S. Junior Champion. With former partner Nathan Miller, she is the 2010 U.S. junior silver medalist.

== Career ==
Simpson was born in Denver, Colorado, and teamed up with Nathan Miller in April 2008. Their partnership ended in 2011.

Simpson teamed up with Blackmer in February 2011 after Miller's retirement. They train in Colorado Springs under coach Dalilah Sappenfield.

In the 2011–2012 season, Simpson and Blackmer won gold at their first Junior Grand Prix event, 2011 JGP Poland, and silver at their second event, 2011 JGP Estonia. They won the bronze medal at the 2011–2012 Junior Grand Prix Final. They competed at the 2012 World Junior Championships and finished 10th.

== Programs ==
=== With Blackmer ===
Season	Short program	Free skating	Exhibition
2013–2014	Flamenco by Didulia	Beethoven's Five Secrets by The Piano Guys	
2012–2013	The Mask of Zorro by James Horner	Henry V by Patrick Doyle	You Should Be Dancing by Bee Gees
2011–2012	Crouching Tiger, Hidden Dragon by Tan Dun	Titanic by James Horner	

== Competitive highlights ==
=== With Blackmer ===
Results
International
Event	2011–2012	2012–2013
Junior Worlds	10th	10th
JGP Final	3rd	
JGP Austria		5th
JGP Estonia	2nd	
JGP Poland	1st	
JGP Germany		5th
National
U.S. Championships	2nd J.	1st J.
J. = Junior level; JGP = Junior Grand Prix

=== With Miller ===
Results
International
Event	2008–2009	2009–2010	2010–2011
GP Skate Canada			6th
GP Cup of Russia			7th
International: Junior
JGP Final		6th	
JGP Germany		3rd	
JGP United States		4th	
National
U.S. Championships	4th J.	2nd J.	
Midwestern Sectionals	4th J.		
GP = Grand Prix; JGP = Junior Grand Prix; J. = Junior level
