= ISU Junior Grand Prix in Austria =

International figure skating competition

Junior Grand Prix in Austria
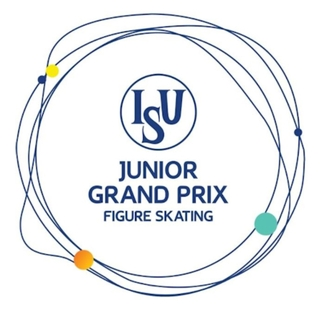
- Status: Inactive
- Genre: ISU Junior Grand Prix
- Frequency: Occasional
- Country: Austria
- Inaugurated: 2007
- Most recent: 2023
- Organizer: Skate Austria

The ISU Junior Grand Prix in Austria – also known as the Cup of Austria – is an international figure skating competition sanctioned by the International Skating Union (ISU), organized and hosted by Skate Austria. It is held periodically as an event of the ISU Junior Grand Prix of Figure Skating (JGP), a series of international competitions exclusively for junior-level skaters. Medals may be awarded in men's singles, women's singles, pair skating, and ice dance. Skaters earn points based on their results at the qualifying competitions each season, and the top skaters or teams in each discipline are invited to then compete at the Junior Grand Prix of Figure Skating Final.

== History ==
The ISU Junior Grand Prix of Figure Skating (JGP) was established by the International Skating Union (ISU) in 1997 and consists of a series of seven international figure skating competitions exclusively for junior-level skaters. The locations of the Junior Grand Prix events change every year. While all seven competitions feature the men's, women's, and ice dance events, only four competitions each season feature the pairs event. Skaters earn points based on their results each season, and the top skaters or teams in each discipline are then invited to compete at the Junior Grand Prix of Figure Skating Final.

Skaters are eligible to compete on the junior-level circuit if they are at least 13 years old before 1 July of the respective season, but not yet 19 (for single skaters), 21 (for men and women in ice dance and women in pair skating), or 23 (for men in pair skating). Competitors are chosen by their respective skating federations. The number of entries allotted to each ISU member nation in each discipline is determined by their results at the prior World Junior Figure Skating Championships.

Austria hosted its first Junior Grand Prix competition – called the Vienna Cup – in 2007 in Vienna. Brandon Mroz and Rachael Flatt won the men's and women's events, respectively, while Emily Samuelson and Evan Bates won the ice dance event. All champions were from the United States.

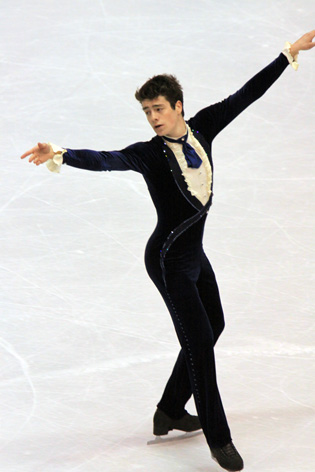
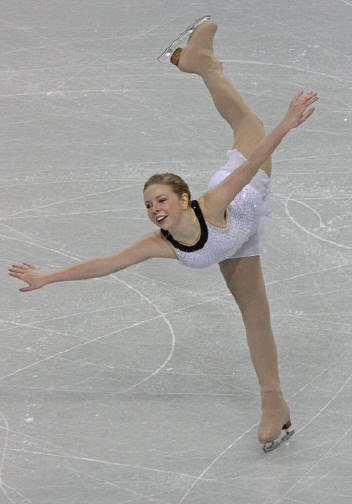
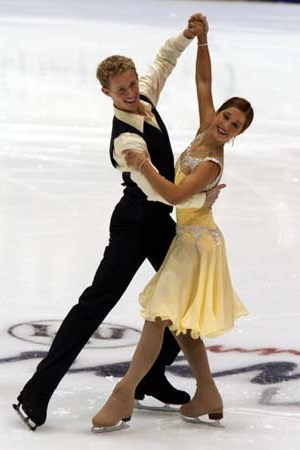
The 2007 Vienna Cup champions (all from the United States): Brandon Mroz (men's singles); Rachael Flatt (women's singles); and Emily Samuelson and Evan Bates (ice dance)

The event has been held every few years in different cities: Graz (2010), Innsbruck (2011), Linz (2012, 2015, 2018, 2021, 2023), and Salzburg (2017). The most recent iteration of this competition took place in 2023.

== Medalists ==
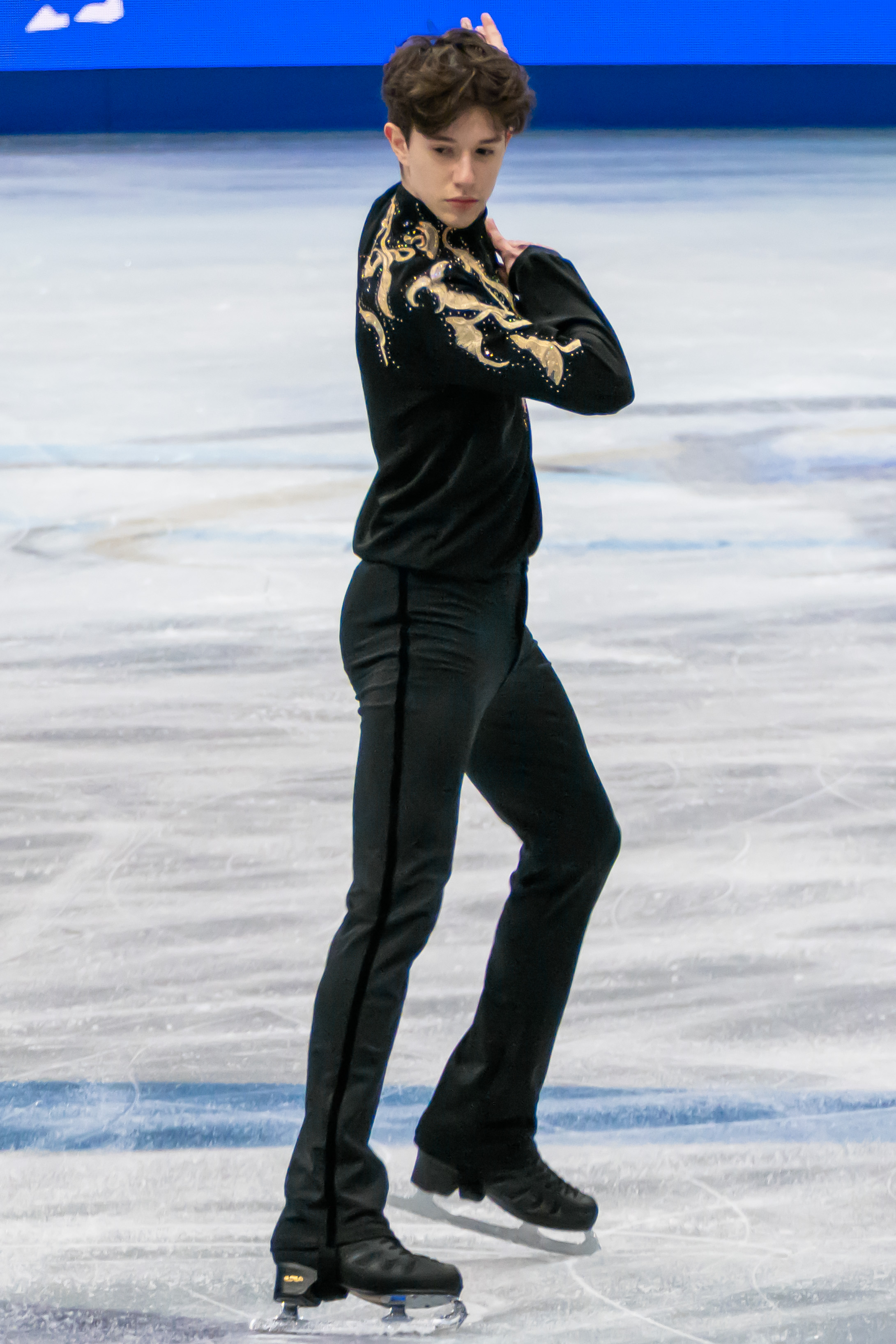
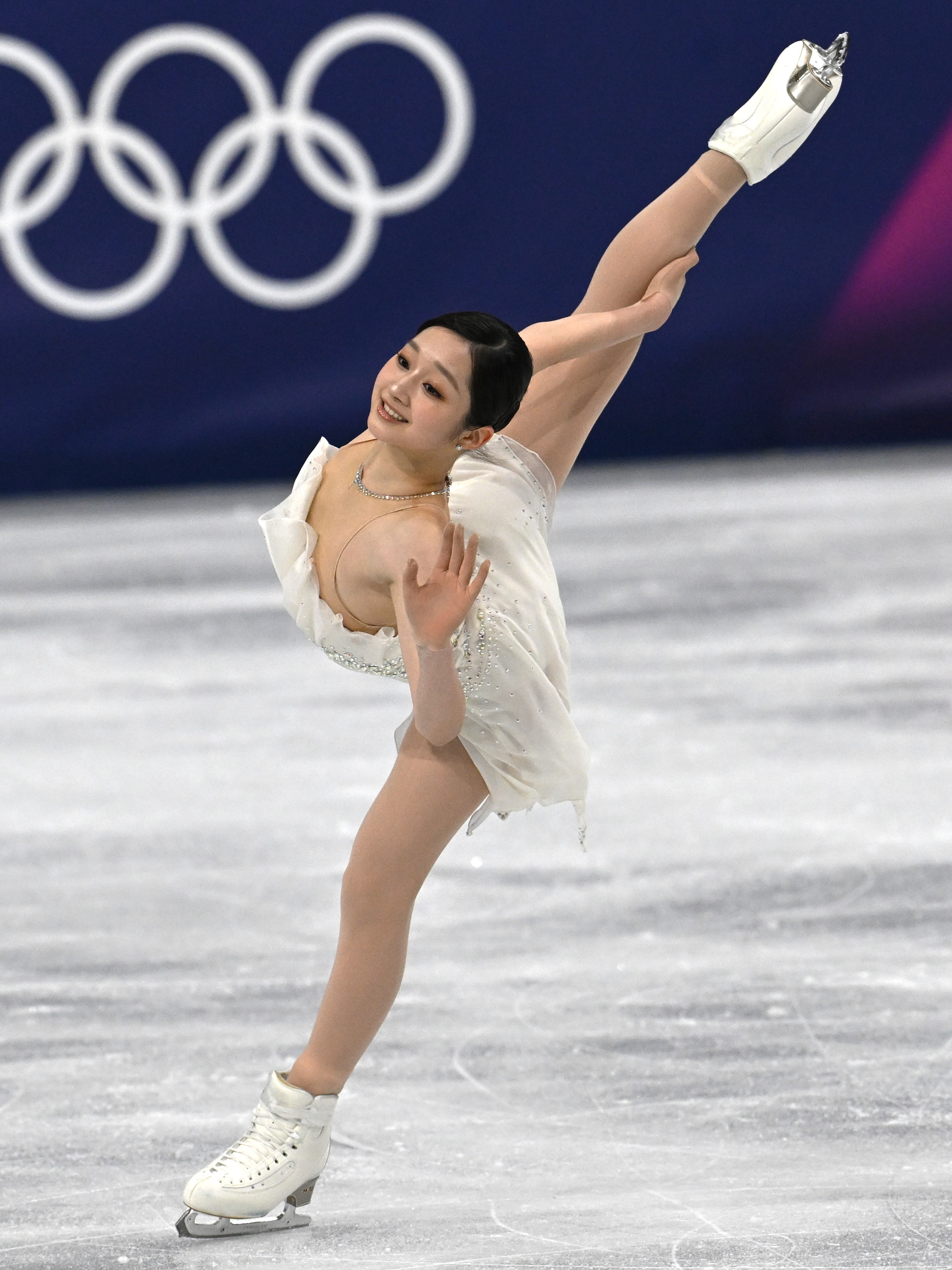
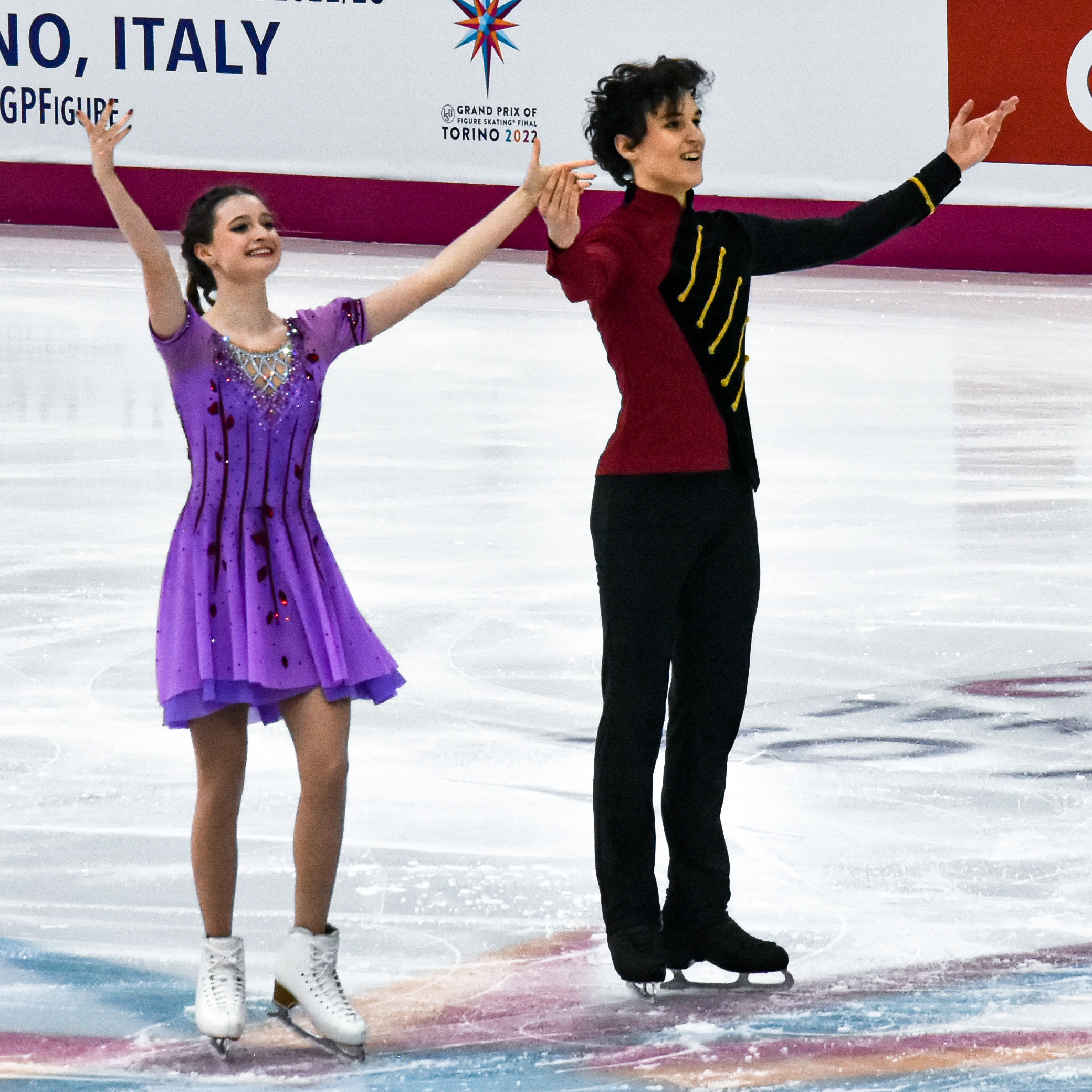
The 2023 Cup of Austria champions: Adam Hagara of Slovakia (men's singles); Shin Ji-a of South Korea (women's singles); and Darya Grimm and Michail Savitskiy of Germany (ice dance)
Not pictured: Martina Ariano Kent and Charly Laliberté Laurent of Canada (pair skating)

=== Men's singles ===
Men's event medalists
Year	Location	Gold	Silver	Bronze	Ref.
2007	Vienna	(United States) Brandon Mroz	(China) Guan Jinlin	(Russia) Artem Borodulin	
2010	Graz	(China) Yan Han	(Russia) Artem Grigoriev	(Russia) Zhan Bush	
2011	Innsbruck	(China) Yan Han	(Russia) Gordei Gorshkov	(Japan) Keiji Tanaka	
2012	Linz	(United States) Nathan Chen	(Japan) Ryuju Hino	(South Korea) Kim Jin-seo	
2015	Linz	(Russia) Dmitri Aliev	(United States) Vincent Zhou	(Ukraine) Ivan Pavlov	
2017	Salzburg	(United States) Camden Pulkinen	(France) Luc Economides	(Russia) Egor Murashov	
2018	Linz	(United States) Camden Pulkinen	(Japan) Koshiro Shimada	(Russia) Roman Savosin	
2021	Linz	(United States) Ilia Malinin	(Russia) Artem Kovalev	(Russia) Kirill Sarnovskiy	
2023	Linz	(Slovakia) Adam Hagara	(South Korea) Kim Hyun-gyeom	(United States) Beck Strommer	

=== Women's singles ===
Women's event medalists
Year	Location	Gold	Silver	Bronze	Ref.
2007	Vienna	(United States) Rachael Flatt	(United States) Kristine Musademba	(Finland) Jenni Vähämaa	
2010	Graz	(Russia) Adelina Sotnikova	(United States) Christina Gao	(China) Li Zijun	
2011	Innsbruck	(United States) Vanessa Lam	(China) Li Zijun	(Russia) Polina Agafonova	
2012	Linz	(Russia) Elena Radionova	(United States) Hannah Miller	(United States) Samantha Cesario	
2015	Linz	(Russia) Maria Sotskova	(Japan) Mai Mihara	(South Korea) Choi Da-bin	
2017	Salzburg	(Russia) Anastasia Tarakanova	(South Korea) Lim Eun-soo	(Japan) Mako Yamashita	
2018	Linz	(Russia) Alena Kostornaia	(Russia) Alena Kanysheva	(Japan) Shiika Yoshioka	
2021	Linz	(Russia) Sofia Muravieva	(United States) Isabeau Levito	(Russia) Anastasia Zinina	
2023	Linz	(South Korea) Shin Ji-a	(Japan) Haruna Murakami	(South Korea) Kwon Min-sol	

=== Pairs ===
Pairs event medalists
Year	Location	Gold	Silver	Bronze	Ref.
2007	Vienna	No pairs competition			
2010	Graz	(Russia); Ksenia Stolbova; Fedor Klimov	(China); Sui Wenjing; Han Cong	(China); Yu Xiaoyu; Jin Yang	
2011	Innsbruck	(China); Sui Wenjing; Han Cong	(China); Yu Xiaoyu; Jin Yang	(Russia); Ekaterina Petaikina; Maxim Kurdyukov	
2012	Linz	(Canada); Brittany Jones; Ian Beharry	(Russia); Lina Fedorova; Maxim Miroshkin	(Russia); Maria Vigalova; Egor Zakroev	
2015	Linz	(Russia); Amina Atakhanova; Ilia Spiridonov	(Czech Republic); Anna Dušková; Martin Bidař	(Ukraine); Renata Oganesian; Mark Bardei	
2017	Salzburg	No pairs competition			
2018	Linz	(Russia); Polina Kostiukovich; Dmitrii Ialin	(Russia); Anastasia Poluianova; Dmitry Sopot	(Russia); Alina Pepeleva; Roman Pleshkov	
2021	Linz	(Russia); Natalia Khabibullina; Ilya Knyazhuk	(Russia); Anastasia Mukhortova; Dmitry Evgenyev	(Georgia (country)); Karina Safina; Luka Berulava	
2023	Linz	(Canada); Martina Ariano Kent; Charly Laliberté Laurent	(United States); Olivia Flores; Luke Wang	(China); Shi Wenning; Wang Zhiyu	

=== Ice dance ===
Ice dance event medalists
Year	Location	Gold	Silver	Bronze	Ref.
2007	Vienna	(United States); Emily Samuelson; Evan Bates	(Russia); Maria Monko; Ilia Tkachenko	(Italy); Isabella Pajardi; Stefano Caruso	
2010	Graz	(United States); Charlotte Lichtman; Dean Copely	(Russia); Victoria Sinitsina; Ruslan Zhiganshin	(France); Gabriella Papadakis; Guillaume Cizeron	
2011	Innsbruck	(Russia); Victoria Sinitsina; Ruslan Zhiganshin	(United States); Alexandra Aldridge; Daniel Eaton	(Ukraine); Maria Nosulia; Yevhen Kholoniuk	
2012	Linz	(France); Gabriella Papadakis; Guillaume Cizeron	(Russia); Anna Yanovskaya; Sergey Mozgov	(Canada); Mackenzie Bent; Garrett MacKeen	
2015	Linz	(Russia); Alla Loboda; Pavel Drozd	(France); Marie-Jade Lauriault; Romain Le Gac	(United States); Julia Biechler; Damian Dodge	
2017	Salzburg	(United States); Christina Carreira; Anthony Ponomarenko	(Russia); Ksenia Konkina; Grigory Yakushev	(France); Natacha Lagouge; Corentin Rahier	
2018	Linz	(Russia); Sofia Shevchenko; Igor Eremenko	(Canada); Marjorie Lajoie; Zachary Lagha	(Russia); Eva Kuts; Dmitrii Mikhailov	
2021	Linz	(Russia); Sofya Tyutyunina; Alexander Shustitskiy	(United States); Oona Brown; Gage Brown	(Canada); Nadiia Bashynska; Peter Beaumont	
2023	Linz	(Germany); Darya Grimm; Michail Savitskiy	(Canada); Chloe Nguyen; Brendan Giang	(United States); Elliana Peal; Ethan Peal	
