= 2011–12 ISU Junior Grand Prix =

Figure skating competition

- Type: ISU Junior Grand Prix
- Date: August 31 – December 11, 2011
- Season: 2011–12
- Location: (Latvia) Riga (Australia) Brisbane (Poland) Gdańsk (Romania) Braşov (Austria) Innsbruck (Italy) Milan (Estonia) Tallinn (Canada) Quebec City
- Previous: 2010–11 ISU Junior Grand Prix
- Next: 2012–13 ISU Junior Grand Prix

The 2011–12 ISU Junior Grand Prix was the 15th season of the series of junior international competitions organized by the International Skating Union. It was the junior-level complement to the 2011–12 ISU Grand Prix of Figure Skating contested by senior-level skaters. Skaters competed in the disciplines of men's singles, ladies' singles, pair skating, and ice dance.

Skaters earned points towards qualifying for the final at each of the seven Junior Grand Prix events. The top six skaters/teams in the series from each discipline met at the 2011–12 Junior Grand Prix Final, which was held concurrently with the senior final.

== Competitions ==
The locations of the JGP events change yearly. In the 2011–12 season, the series was composed of the following events in autumn 2011:

Date	Event	Location	Other notes
September 1–3	2011 JGP Volvo Cup	Riga, Latvia	
September 8–10	2011 JGP Brisbane	Brisbane, Australia	No pair competition
September 15–17	2011 JGP Baltic Cup	Gdańsk, Poland	
September 22–24	2011 JGP Brasov Cup	Braşov, Romania	No pair competition
Sept. 29 – Oct. 1	2011 JGP Cup of Austria	Innsbruck, Austria	
October 6–8	2011 JGP Trofeo W. Lombardi	Milan, Italy	No pair competition
October 13–15	2011 JGP Tallinn Cup	Tallinn, Estonia	
December 8–11	2011–12 Junior Grand Prix Final	Quebec City, Canada	

The JGP Final was held in conjunction with the senior-level version.

== Qualifying ==
Skaters who reached the age of 13 by July 1, 2011, but had not turned 19 (singles and females of the other two disciplines) or 21 (male pair skaters and ice dancers) were eligible to compete on the junior circuit. Unlike the senior Grand Prix, skaters for the JGP were not seeded by the ISU. The number of entries allotted to each ISU member federation was determined by their skaters' placements at the previous season's Junior World Championships in each respective discipline.

For the 2011–2012 season, in singles, the three best placed member nations at the 2011 Junior Worlds were allowed to enter two skaters in all seven events. Member nations which placed 4th through 6th were allowed to enter one skater in all seven events, those which placed 7th through 12th were allowed one skater in six of the seven events, and those with a skater who qualified for the free skate were allowed one skater in five of the events. Member nations which did not qualify for the free skate but placed 25th through 30th in the short program were allowed to enter one skater in four of the events, those which placed 31st and lower in the short program were allowed one skater in three of the events, and those countries which did not participate in the 2011 Junior Worlds were allowed one skater in two events. There were provisions for additional entries per member country if another country did not use all of its allotted entries.

In pairs, member nations which placed in the top five at the 2011 World Junior Championships were allowed to enter three entries in all four events which included pairs. Member nations which qualified for the free skate were allowed two entries in all four events, and all others were allowed one entry in all four events. There was no limit on host nation pair entries.

In ice dance, the multiple spots allowance was the same as for singles, through one entry in five events.

The host country was allowed to enter up to three skaters/teams in singles and dance, with no limit for pair teams from the host nation.

The general spots allowance for the 2011–2012 Junior Grand Prix events was as follows:

Entries	Men	Ladies	Pairs	Ice dance
3 per event			Canada; China; Japan; Russia; United States	
2 per event	Canada; Japan; Sweden	Japan; Russia; United States	Austria; Czech Republic; Hungary; Italy; Poland; Switzerland; Ukraine	France; Russia; United States
1 per event	China; Russia; United States	Belgium; China; France		Canada; Spain; Slovakia
1 in six events	Belgium; Czech Republic; Estonia; France; Kazakhstan; Ukraine	Austria; Estonia; Finland; Italy; Switzerland; Slovakia		Estonia; United Kingdom; Germany; Kazakhstan; Switzerland; Ukraine
1 in five events	Belarus; Finland; Germany; Poland	Australia; Germany; South Korea; Slovenia; Sweden		Italy
1 in four events	Italy; South Korea; Spain; Switzerland; Chinese Taipei	Canada; Denmark; Latvia; Poland; Turkey		Austria; Uzbekistan; China; Switzerland; Estonia; Belarus; Romania
1 in three events	Armenia; Australia; Brazil; Bulgaria; United Kingdom; Georgia; Hong Kong; Latvia; Lithuania; Malaysia; Netherlands; Romania; Thailand; Turkey	Armenia; Belarus; Brazil; Bulgaria; United Kingdom; Hong Kong; Hungary; Israel; Kazakhstan; Lithuania; Malaysia; Mexico; Mongolia; Netherlands; Norway; New Zealand; Philippines; South Africa; Singapore; Serbia; Spain; Thailand; Chinese Taipei; Ukraine		Australia; Finland; Israel; Japan; Latvia; Lithuania; New Zealand; Turkey

All other member nations had one entry per discipline in two of the seven events in singles and ice dance and one entry in all four events in pairs.

== Junior Grand Prix Final qualification and qualifiers ==
=== Qualification rules ===
At each event, skaters/teams earned points toward qualification for the Junior Grand Prix Final. Following the 7th event, the top six highest scoring skaters/teams advanced to the Final. The points earned per placement was as follows:

Placement	Points (Singles/Dance)	Points (Pairs)
1st	15	15
2nd	13	13
3rd	11	11
4th	9	9
5th	7	7
6th	5	5
7th	4	4
8th	3	3
9th	2	–
10th	1	–

There were seven tie-breakers in cases of a tie in overall points:

1. Highest placement at an event. If a skater placed 1st and 3rd, the tiebreaker was the 1st place, and that beat a skater who placed 2nd in both events.
2. Highest combined total scores in both events. If a skater earned 200 points at one event and 250 at a second, that skater would win in the second tie-break over a skater who earned 200 points at one event and 150 at another.
3. Participated in two events.
4. Highest combined scores in the free skating/free dance portion of both events.
5. Highest individual score in the free skating/free dance portion from one event.
6. Highest combined scores in the short program/short dance of both events.
7. Highest number of total participants at the events.

If there was still a tie, the tie was considered unbreakable and the tied skaters all advanced to the Junior Grand Prix Final.

=== Qualifiers ===
The following skaters qualified for the 2011–2012 Junior Grand Prix Final.

	Men	Ladies	Pairs	Ice dance
1	(China) Yan Han	(Russia) Yulia Lipnitskaya	(China) Sui Wenjing / Han Cong	(Russia) Victoria Sinitsina / Ruslan Zhiganshin
2	(United States) Joshua Farris	(Russia) Polina Shelepen	(United States) Britney Simpson / Matthew Blackmer	(Russia) Alexandra Stepanova / Ivan Bukin
3	(United States) Jason Brown	(United States) Vanessa Lam	(Canada) Katherine Bobak / Ian Beharry	(Russia) Anna Yanovskaia / Sergey Mozgov
4	(Russia) Maxim Kovtun	(Japan) Risa Shoji	(China) Yu Xiaoyu / Jin Yang	(Ukraine) Maria Nosulia / Evgen Kholoniuk
5	(Japan) Ryuju Hino	(China) Zijun Li	(Russia) Ekaterina Petaikina / Maxim Kurduykov	(Ukraine) Anastasia Galyeta / Alexei Shumski
6	(Japan) Keiji Tanaka	(Russia) Polina Korobeynikova	(United States) ~~Jessica Calalang / Zack Sidhu~~ (withdrew)	(United States) Alexandra Aldridge / Daniel Eaton
Alternates
1st	(Russia) Artur Dmitriev, Jr.	(United States) Samantha Cesario	(Russia) Tatiana Tudvaseva / Sergei Lisiev (called up)	(United States) Lauri Bonacorsi / Travis Mager
2nd	(China) Zhang He	(Russia) Polina Agafonova	(Canada) Margaret Purdy / Michael Marinaro	(Russia) Valeria Zenkova / Valerie Sinitsin
3rd	(South Korea) Lee June-hyoung	(Japan) Satoko Miyahara	(Czech Republic) Klára Kadlecová / Petr Bidař	(Russia) Evgenia Kosigina / Nikolai Moroshkin

== Medalists ==
=== Men ===
In Milan, Italy, Lee June-hyoung became the first Korean male skater to medal at an ISU competition.

Competition	Gold	Silver	Bronze	Details
JGP Latvia	(Japan) Ryuju Hino	(China) Zhang He	(United States) Timothy Dolensky	Details
JGP Australia	(United States) Jason Brown	(Japan) Keiji Tanaka	(Canada) Liam Firus	Details
JGP Poland	(United States) Joshua Farris	(Russia) Artur Dmitriev, Jr.	(Japan) Ryuichi Kihara	Details
JGP Romania	(Russia) Maxim Kovtun	(Japan) Ryuju Hino	(Canada) Nam Nguyen	Details
JGP Austria	(China) Han Yan	(Russia) Gordei Gorshkov	(Japan) Keiji Tanaka	Details
JGP Italy	(China) Han Yan	(United States) Jason Brown	(South Korea) Lee June-hyoung	Details
JGP Estonia	(United States) Joshua Farris	(Russia) Maxim Kovtun	(Japan) Shoma Uno	Details
JGP Final	(United States) Jason Brown	(China) Yan Han	(United States) Joshua Farris	Details

=== Ladies ===
Competition	Gold	Silver	Bronze	Details
JGP Latvia	(Russia) Polina Shelepen	(China) Li Zijun	(Russia) Polina Agafonova	Details
JGP Australia	(United States) Courtney Hicks	(Japan) Risa Shoji	(United States) Vanessa Lam	Details
JGP Poland	(Russia) Yulia Lipnitskaya	(Japan) Satoko Miyahara	(United States) Samantha Cesario	Details
JGP Romania	(Russia) Polina Shelepen	(Russia) Polina Korobeynikova	(South Korea) Kim Hae-jin	Details
JGP Austria	(United States) Vanessa Lam	(China) Li Zijun	(Russia) Polina Agafonova	Details
JGP Italy	(Russia) Yulia Lipnitskaya	(Russia) Anna Shershak	(United States) Hannah Miller	Details
JGP Estonia	(United States) Gracie Gold	(Japan) Risa Shoji	(United States) Samantha Cesario	Details
JGP Final	(Russia) Yulia Lipnitskaya	(Russia) Polina Shelepen	(Russia) Polina Korobeynikova	Details

=== Pairs ===
Competition	Gold	Silver	Bronze	Details
JGP Latvia	(China) Sui Wenjing / Han Cong	(China) Yu Xiaoyu / Jin Yang	(Canada) Margaret Purdy / Michael Marinaro	Details
JGP Australia	No pairs competition held			
JGP Poland	(United States) Britney Simpson / Matthew Blackmer	(Canada) Katherine Bobak / Ian Beharry	(Russia) Tatiana Tudvaseva / Sergei Lisiev	Details
JGP Romania	No pairs competition held			
JGP Austria	(China) Sui Wenjing / Han Cong	(China) Yu Xiaoyu / Jin Yang	(Russia) Ekaterina Petaikina / Maxim Kurduykov	Details
JGP Italy	No pairs competition held			
JGP Estonia	(Canada) Katherine Bobak / Ian Beharry	(United States) Britney Simpson / Matthew Blackmer	(United States) Jessica Calalang / Zack Sidhu	Details
JGP Final	(China) Sui Wenjing / Han Cong	(Canada) Katherine Bobak / Ian Beharry	(United States) Britney Simpson / Matthew Blackmer	Details

=== Ice dance ===
Competition	Gold	Silver	Bronze	Details
JGP Latvia	(Ukraine) Maria Nosulia / Evgeni Kholoniuk	(Russia) Evgenia Kosigina / Nikolai Moroshkin	(United States) Alexandra Aldridge / Daniel Eaton	Details
JGP Australia	(Canada) Nicole Orford / Thomas Williams	(United States) Lauri Bonacorsi / Travis Mager	(Russia) Valeria Zenkova / Valerie Sinitsin	Details
JGP Poland	(Russia) Victoria Sinitsina / Ruslan Zhiganshin	(Ukraine) Anastasia Galyeta / Alexei Shumski	(Russia) Anna Yanovskaia / Sergey Mozgov	Details
JGP Romania	(Russia) Alexandra Stepanova / Ivan Bukin	(Ukraine) Anastasia Galyeta / Alexei Shumski	(Canada) Mackenzie Bent / Garrett MacKeen	Details
JGP Austria	(Russia) Victoria Sinitsina / Ruslan Zhiganshin	(United States) Alexandra Aldridge / Daniel Eaton	(Ukraine) Maria Nosulia / Evgeni Kholoniuk	Details
JGP Italy	(Russia) Alexandra Stepanova / Ivan Bukin	(Russia) Valeria Zenkova / Valerie Sinitsin	(United States) Lauri Bonacorsi / Travis Mager	Details
JGP Estonia	(Russia) Anna Yanovskaia / Sergey Mozgov	(Estonia) Irina Shtork / Taavi Rand	(Russia) Evgenia Kosigina / Nikolai Moroshkin	Details
JGP Final	(Russia) Victoria Sinitsina / Ruslan Zhiganshin	(Russia) Anna Yanovskaia / Sergey Mozgov	(Russia) Alexandra Stepanova / Ivan Bukin	Details

== Medals table ==
The following is the table of total medals earned by each country on the 2011–2012 Junior Grand Prix. It can be sorted by country name, number of gold medals, number of silver medals, number of bronze medals, and total medals overall. The table is numbered by number of total medals.

Rank	Nation	Gold	Silver	Bronze	Total
1	Russia (RUS)	12	9	9	30
2	United States (USA)	8	4	10	22
3	China (CHN)	5	6	0	11
4	Canada (CAN)	2	2	4	8
5	Japan (JPN)	1	5	3	9
6	Ukraine (UKR)	1	2	1	4
7	Estonia (EST)	0	1	0	1
8	South Korea (KOR)	0	0	2	2
Totals (8 entries)		29	29	29	87

== Top scores ==
=== Men's singles ===
Top 10 best scores in the men's combined total
No.	Skater	Nation	Score	Event
1	Han Yan	China	219.37	2011 JGP Italy
2	Jason Brown	United States	208.41	2011–12 JGP Final
3	Joshua Farris	United States	207.67	2011 JGP Estonia
4	Artur Dmitriev, Jr.	Russia	197.09	2011 JGP Poland
5	Maxim Kovtun	Russia	193.76	2011–12 Junior Grand Prix Final
6	Keiji Tanaka	Japan	192.36	2011 JGP Australia
7	Ryuju Hino	Japan	182.71	2011 JGP Latvia
8	Zhang He	China	182.38	2011 JGP Latvia
9	Gordei Gorshkov	Russia	180.25	2011 JGP Austria
10	Liam Firus	Canada	180.00	2011 JGP Australia

=== Women's singles ===
Top 10 best scores in the women's combined total
No.	Skater	Nation	Score	Event
1	Yulia Lipnitskaya	Russia	183.05	2011 JGP Italy
2	Gracie Gold	United States	172.69	2011 JGP Estonia
3	Polina Shelepen	Russia	162.34	2011–12 Junior Grand Prix Final
4	Satoko Miyahara	Japan	162.20	2011 JGP Poland
5	Risa Shoji	Japan	157.83	2011 JGP Estonia
6	Vanessa Lam	United States	156.58	2011 JGP Austria
7	Li Zijun	China	156.40	2011 JGP Austria
8	Samantha Cesario	United States	153.84	2011 JGP Poland
9	Courtney Hicks	United States	151.91	2011 JGP Australia
10	Polina Korobeynikova	Russia	151.18	2011–12 JGP Final

=== Pairs ===
Top 10 best scores in the pairs' combined total
No.	Team	Nation	Score	Event
1	Sui Wenjing / Han Cong	China	167.14	2011 JGP Austria
2	Yu Xiaoyu / Jin Yang	China	154.37	2011 JGP Austria
3	Katherine Bobak / Ian Beharry	Canada	152.65	2011–12 Junior Grand Prix Final
4	Britney Simpson / Matthew Blackmer	United States	146.35	2011–12 Junior Grand Prix Final
5	Ekaterina Petaikina / Maxim Kurduykov	Russia	146.17	2011–12 Junior Grand Prix Final
6	Jessica Calalang / Zack Sidhu	United States	139.32	2011 JGP Estonia
7	Li Meiyi / Jiang Bo	China	138.92	2011 JGP Austria
8	Lina Fedorova / Maxim Miroshkin	Russia	134.88	2011 JGP Austria
9	Margaret Purdy / Michael Marinaro	Canada	134.46	2011 JGP Latvia
10	Tatiana Tudvaseva / Sergei Lisiev	Russia	133.79	2011–12 Junior Grand Prix Final

=== Ice dance ===
Top 10 season's best scores in the combined total (ice dance)
No.	Team	Nation	Score	Event
1	Victoria Sinitsina / Ruslan Zhiganshin	Russia	151.10	2011 JGP Austria
2	Alexandra Stepanova / Ivan Bukin	Russia	149.98	2011 JGP Italy
3	Anna Yanovskaia / Sergey Mozgov	Russia	142.72	2011 JGP Estonia
4	Alexandra Aldridge / Daniel Eaton	United States	136.85	2011 JGP Austria
5	Valeria Zenkova / Valerie Sinitsin	Russia	130.58	2011 JGP Italy
6	Lauri Bonacorsi / Travis Mager	United States	129.63	2011 JGP Italy
7	Maria Nosulia / Evgen Kholoniuk	Ukraine	128.34	2011 JGP Austria
8	Nicole Orford / Thomas Williams	Canada	127.21	2011 JGP Australia
9	Irina Shtork / Taavi Rand	Estonia	126.51	2011 JGP Estonia
10	Shari Koch / Christian Nüchtern	Germany	124.35	2011 JGP Italy
