= Lauri Bonacorsi =

American ice dancer

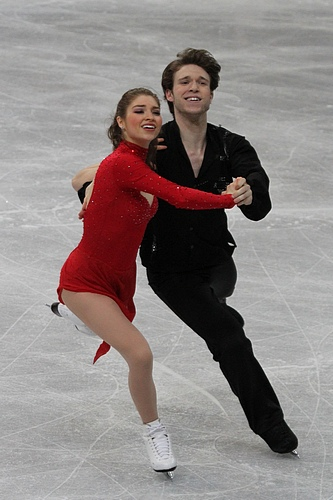
- Bonacorsi and Mager in 2012

Personal information
- Born: January 17, 1993 (age 33) St. Louis, Missouri, U.S.
- Height: 5 ft 3 in (1.61 m)

Figure skating career
- Country: United States
- Coach: Natalia Linichuk, Valter Rizzo, Massimo Scali, Brunhilde Bianchi
- Began skating: 1997

Lauri Bonacorsi (born January 17, 1993) is an American ice dancer. With former partner Travis Mager, she is the 2011 and 2012 U.S. Junior silver medalist.

== Career ==
Bonacorsi began skating at age four. She moved from St. Louis, Missouri, to Plano, Texas, in 2007. She spent the 2007–08 season in search of a partner. Travis Mager found her on IcePartnerSearch and they tried out together in February and April 2008. Bonacorsi and Mager officially teamed up in late May 2008. She relocated to Maryland to train with him.

Bonacorsi and Mager won the 2009 U.S. novice ice dancing title. They won the bronze medal at the 2009 JGP Lake Placid. In May 2010, they changed coaches to Natalia Linichuk and Gennadi Karponosov at the IceWorks Skating Complex in Aston, Pennsylvania.

In the 2010–11 season, Bonacorsi and Mager won the bronze medal at the 2010 JGP Brasov Cup in Romania. They won silver on the junior level at the U.S. Championships and placed 11th at the 2011 World Junior Championships.

Bonacorsi and Mager won the silver medal at the 2011 Junior Grand Prix event in Brisbane, Australia, and bronze at another JGP event, the Walter Lombardi Trophy in Milan, Italy. They were the first alternates to the 2011 Junior Grand Prix Final in Quebec City, Canada in December 2011. Bonacorsi and Mager finished 7th at the 2012 World Junior Championships. They announced the end of their partnership in April 2012.

Bonacorsi tried out with Francesco Fioretti of Milan, Italy, in May, 2014, and upon receiving her release from United States Figure Skating, began representing Italy with Fioretti in June, 2014. They worked with choreographer Massimo Scali, and coaches Johnny Johns, Maurizio Margaglio, and Marina Zoueva before Bonacorsi moved to Italy to train with their main coaches, Valter Rizzo and Brunhilde Bianchi.

== Personal life ==
Bonacorsi took time off from skating to pursue an Ivy League education, studying International Relations and Political Science at the University of Pennsylvania. She graduated from Radnor High School in Radnor, PA in June 2011. She attended law school at Northwestern University and graduated in 2021.

== Programs ==
(with Mager)

| Season | Short dance | Free dance |
|---|---|---|
| 2011–2012 | Cha Cha: Chilly Cha Cha by Jessica Jay; Rhumba: Bésame Mucho performed by Nana Mouskouri | Close to You by Sandra and Tony Alessi |
| 2010–2011 | My Sweet and Tender Beast by Eugen Doga | The Mask: Cuban Pete by José Norman; This Business of Love by Howie Hersh; Hey Pachuco Royal Crown Revue |
| 2009–2010 | Tarantella medley (Italian folk) by Al Caiola | River Flows in You by Yiruma; I Giorni by Ludovico Einaudi |
| 2008–2009 | | The Last Emperor; Merry Christmas, Mr. Lawrence by Ryuichi Sakamoto |

== Competitive highlights ==
=== With Fioretti for Italy ===
International
| Event | 2014–15 |
|---|---|
| CS Nebelhorn Trophy | 10th |

=== With Mager for the United States ===
Results
International
| Event | 2009–10 | 2010–11 | 2011–12 |
|---|---|---|---|
| World Junior Championships | | 11th | 7th |
| JGP Australia | | | 2nd |
| JGP Germany | 9th | | |
| JGP Great Britain | | 5th | |
| JGP Italy | | | 3rd |
| JGP Romania | | 3rd | |
| JGP United States | 3rd | | |
National
| U.S. Championships | 6th J. | 2nd J. | 2nd J. |
