= Katherine Bobak =

Canadian pair skater

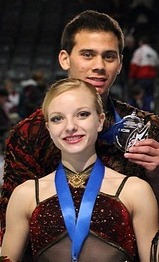
- Bobak and Beharry in 2011

Personal information
- Born: August 8, 1994 (age 32) Guelph, Ontario
- Home town: Guelph, Ontario
- Height: 1.56 m (5 ft 1 1/2 in)

Figure skating career
- Country: Canada
- Coach: Lee Barkell, Doug Leigh, Kevin Wheeler
- Skating club: Preston Figure Skating Club
- Began skating: 1997
Medal record
Representing Canada
Figure skating: Pairs
Junior Grand Prix Final
| Silver medal – second place | 2011–12 Quebec | Pairs |

Katherine Bobak (born August 8, 1994) is a Canadian pair skater. With Ian Beharry, she is the 2011 JGP Final silver medalist and the 2012 Canadian national junior champion. With Matthew Penasse, she is the 2009 Canadian national novice champion and two-time (2010–2011) Canadian junior bronze medalist.

== Career ==
Early in her career, Bobak competed with Matthew Penasse. They competed once on the JGP series, are the 2009 Canadian National Novice Pair Champions and won two national bronze medals on the junior level.

Bobak teamed up with Ian Beharry on February 12, 2011. In the 2011–12 season, they won silver at their first Junior Grand Prix event in Poland and gold at their second event in Estonia, earning a berth to the 2011–12 Junior Grand Prix Final. They won the silver medal at the event and set a new Canadian junior pair record with their score of 152.65 points. Bobak and Beharry then won the 2012 Canadian Junior Championships. They finished 7th at the 2012 World Junior Championships. In April 2012, Bobak and Beharry ended their partnership.

== Programs ==
=== With Beharry ===
| Season | Short program | Free skating | Exhibition |
|---|---|---|---|
| 2011–2012 | I Had a Farm in Africa (from Out of Africa) by John Barry | Adagio of Spartacus and Phrygia by Aram Khachaturian | Who Wants To Live Forever by Queen |

=== With Penasse ===
| Season | Short program | Free skating |
|---|---|---|
| 2009–2010 | Molitva by Vladimir Graić | Bram Stoker's Dracula by Wojciech Kilar |

== Competitive highlights ==
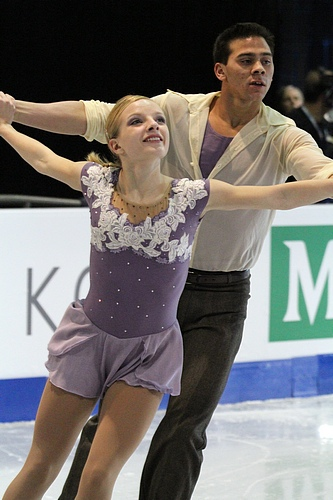
Bobak and Beharry in 2011

=== With Beharry ===
International
| Event | 2011–2012 |
|---|---|
| World Junior Championships | 7th |
| ISU Junior Grand Prix Final | 2nd |
| ISU Junior Grand Prix in Estonia | 1st |
| ISU Junior Grand Prix in Poland | 2nd |
National
| Canadian Championships | 1st J. |
J. = Junior level

=== With Penasse ===
International
| Event | 2008–09 | 2009–10 | 2010–11 |
|---|---|---|---|
| JGP United States | | 8th | |
National
| Canadian Championships | 1st N. | 3rd J. | 3rd J. |
Levels: N. = Novice; J. = Junior
