= 2012 U.S. Figure Skating Championships =

Figure skating competition

2012 United States Figure Skating Championships
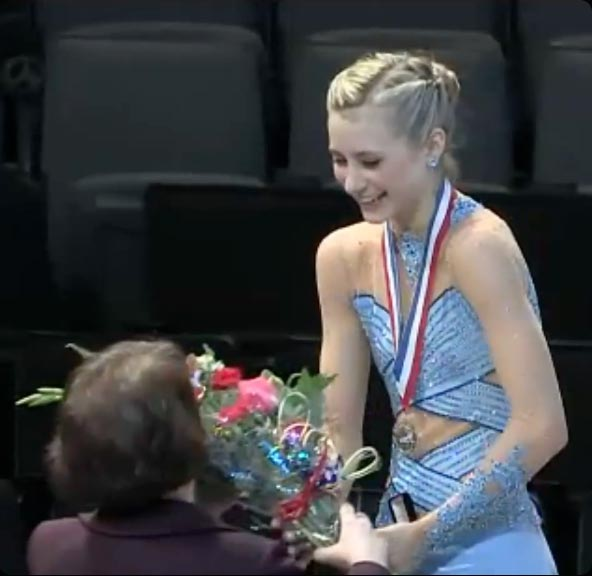
- Ashley Cain Silver Nationals
- Type: National Championship
- Date: January 22 – 29
- Season: 2011–12
- Location: San Jose, California
- Venue: HP Pavilion

Champions
- Men's singles: Jeremy Abbott (S); Nathan Chen (J); Vincent Zhou (N)
- Ladies' singles: Ashley Wagner (S); Gracie Gold (J); Karen Chen (N)
- Pairs: Caydee Denney / John Coughlin (S); Haven Denney / Brandon Frazier (J); Chelsie Liu / Devin Perini (N)
- Ice dance: Meryl Davis / Charlie White (S); Alexandra Aldridge / Daniel Eaton (J); Holly Moore / Daniel Klaber (N)
- Previous: 2011 U.S. Championships
- Next: 2013 U.S. Championships

The 2012 U.S. Figure Skating Championships was a figure skating national championship during the 2011–12 season. Medals were awarded in the disciplines of men's singles, ladies' singles, pair skating and ice dancing on the senior, junior, and novice levels. The competition was part of the selection process for several international events, including the 2012 World Championships.

The event was held at the HP Pavilion in San Jose, California on January 22–29, 2012.

== Senior results ==
=== Senior men ===
Rank	Name	Total points	SP		FS	
1	Jeremy Abbott	273.58	1	90.23	1	183.35
2	Adam Rippon	240.87	2	82.94	2	157.93
3	Ross Miner	230.32	4	78.90	3	151.42
4	Armin Mahbanoozadeh	224.63	3	80.66	6	143.97
5	Douglas Razzano	223.38	8	72.50	4	150.88
6	Stephen Carriere	213.41	9	71.82	7	141.59
7	Keegan Messing	212.47	5	76.66	12	135.81
8	Max Aaron	211.15	6	76.01	13	135.14
9	Jason Brown	209.16	7	75.68	14	133.48
10	Scott Dyer	207.97	13	66.49	9	141.48
11	Jonathan Cassar	207.75	11	67.86	10	139.89
12	Grant Hochstein	206.23	10	67.89	11	138.34
13	Richard Dornbush	200.59	17	51.59	5	149.00
14	Brandon Mroz	200.14	12	67.47	15	132.67
15	Alexander Johnson	199.23	15	57.73	8	141.50
16	Joshua Farris	197.98	14	65.43	16	132.55
17	Wesley Campbell	166.94	20	45.93	17	121.01
18	William Brewster	156.48	16	55.70	19	100.78
19	Alexander Aiken	152.44	18	49.05	18	103.39
20	Daniel Raad	147.37	19	47.11	20	100.26

=== Senior ladies ===
Rank	Name	Total points	SP		FS	
1	Ashley Wagner	187.02	3	63.06	1	123.96
2	Alissa Czisny	180.00	2	63.14	2	116.86
3	Agnes Zawadzki	174.10	1	66.24	7	107.86
4	Caroline Zhang	173.19	4	60.18	3	113.01
5	Christina Gao	166.36	6	54.83	5	111.53
6	Rachael Flatt	164.98	9	52.71	4	112.27
7	Mirai Nagasu	163.99	5	59.02	8	104.97
8	Angela Wang	158.66	16	48.98	6	109.68
9	Vanessa Lam	157.62	7	54.57	9	103.05
10	Kiri Baga	149.38	14	50.15	10	99.23
11	Nina Jiang	146.42	8	53.66	12	92.76
12	Leah Keiser	145.55	10	52.44	11	93.11
13	McKinzie Daniels	140.42	15	49.96	14	90.46
14	Joelle Forte	139.82	17	48.13	13	91.69
15	Yasmin Siraj	138.83	11	51.96	15	86.87
16	Haley Dunne	136.28	12	51.41	16	84.87
17	Sophia Adams	125.22	13	51.40	18	73.82
18	Morgan Bell	112.48	18	38.55	17	73.93
19	Aimee Buchanan	101.89	19	37.77	19	64.12

=== Senior pairs ===
Rank	Name	Total points	SP		FS	
1	Caydee Denney / John Coughlin	189.70	3	60.88	1	128.82
2	Mary Beth Marley / Rockne Brubaker	186.07	1	65.80	2	120.27
3	Amanda Evora / Mark Ladwig	178.98	2	61.27	3	117.71
4	Gretchen Donlan / Andrew Speroff	171.61	5	57.77	4	113.84
5	Marissa Castelli / Simon Shnapir	168.81	4	60.56	7	108.25
6	Ashley Cain / Joshua Reagan	166.65	7	53.04	5	113.61
7	Andrea Poapst / Christopher Knierim	166.38	6	53.43	6	112.95
8	Felicia Zhang / Nathan Bartholomay	156.57	9	49.57	8	107.00
9	Tiffany Vise / Don Baldwin	140.97	10	45.65	9	95.32
10	Alexa Scimeca / Ivan Dimitrov	132.62	8	51.93	11	80.69
11	Cassie Andrews / Timothy Leduc	128.52	11	45.35	10	83.17
12	Kloe Chanel Bautista / Tyler Harris	122.72	12	42.16	12	80.56
13	Rita Fehr / Peter Biver	85.05	13	31.37	13	53.68

=== Senior ice dancing ===
Rank	Name	Total points	SD		FD	
1	Meryl Davis / Charlie White	191.54	1	76.89	1	114.65
2	Maia Shibutani / Alex Shibutani	178.84	2	72.61	2	106.23
3	Madison Hubbell / Zachary Donohue	151.60	3	57.56	3	94.04
4	Lynn Kriengkrairut / Logan Giulietti-Schmitt	148.55	4	56.37	4	92.18
5	Madison Chock / Evan Bates	145.08	5	55.49	5	89.59
6	Anastasia Cannuscio / Colin McManus	137.37	6	53.82	7	83.55
7	Anastasia Olson / Jordan Cowan	137.08	7	53.44	6	83.64
8	Emily Samuelson / Todd Gilles	135.99	8	53.24	8	82.75
9	Isabella Cannuscio / Ian Lorello	130.35	10	50.03	9	80.32
10	Charlotte Lichtman / Dean Copely	129.22	9	52.55	10	76.67
11	Ginna Hoptman / Pavel Filchenkov	114.88	11	46.27	12	68.61
12	Brittany Schmucker / Adam Munday	113.54	12	43.18	11	70.36
13	Meredith Zuber / Kyle Herring	109.29	13	43.13	13	66.16
14	Carina Glastris / Kevin Allison	60.46	14	28.22	14	32.24

== Junior results ==
=== Junior men ===
Rank	Name	Total points	SP		FS	
1	Nathan Chen	193.90	2	63.15	1	130.75
2	Timothy Dolensky	187.84	1	63.20	3	124.64
3	Philip Warren	182.17	5	57.42	2	124.75
4	Harrison Choate	163.43	10	45.18	4	118.25
5	Lukas Kaugars	154.95	4	57.96	6	96.99
6	Timothy Koleto	149.01	3	59.18	10	89.83
7	Jay Yostanto	148.54	6	54.72	7	93.82
8	Troy Tomasello	147.36	7	53.90	8	93.46
9	Ryan Hartley	141.85	11	44.67	5	97.18
10	Andrew Nagode	134.99	9	47.91	11	87.08
11	David Wang	132.72	8	52.62	12	80.10
12	Emmanuel Savary	129.45	12	36.37	9	93.08

=== Junior ladies ===
Rank	Name	Total points	SP		FS	
1	Gracie Gold	178.92	1	60.21	1	118.71
2	Ashley Cain	155.48	3	51.80	2	103.68
3	Hannah Miller	149.68	2	54.44	4	95.24
4	Barbie Long	144.57	5	48.80	3	95.77
5	Mariah Bell	136.90	6	46.75	5	90.15
6	Polina Edmunds	134.06	4	51.02	6	83.04
7	Gwendolyn Prescott	119.53	8	44.84	9	74.69
8	Jenelle Herman	117.85	10	39.03	7	78.82
9	Katarina Kulgeyko	115.93	7	46.55	10	69.38
10	Allison Timlen	111.57	12	35.94	8	75.63
11	Jessica Hu	110.12	9	42.35	11	67.77
12	Camille Davis	102.67	11	37.43	12	65.24

=== Junior pairs ===
Rank	Name	Total points	SP		FS	
1	Haven Denney / Brandon Frazier	148.84	1	52.83	2	96.01
2	Britney Simpson / Matthew Blackmer	146.43	3	49.12	1	97.31
3	Kylie Duarte / Colin Grafton	144.35	4	48.83	3	95.52
4	Jessica Calalang / Zack Sidhu	134.84	2	50.84	4	84.00
5	Jessica Pfund / AJ Reiss	126.99	7	43.71	5	83.28
6	Madeline Aaron / Max Settlage	125.34	5	46.26	6	79.08
7	AnnaMarie Pearce / Craig Norris	122.21	6	45.54	7	76.67
8	Brianna de la Mora / Taylor Wilson	114.27	8	39.44	8	74.83
9	Olivia Oltmanns / Joshua Santillan	109.30	10	37.40	9	71.90
10	Audrey Goldberg / Joseph Dolkiewicz	108.99	11	37.15	10	71.84
11	Cali Fujimoto / Nicholas Barsi-Rhyne	107.44	9	38.45	11	68.99

=== Junior ice dancing ===
Rank	Name	Total points	SD		FD	
1	Alexandra Aldridge / Daniel Eaton	142.10	1	54.42	1	87.68
2	Lauri Bonacorsi / Travis Mager	133.73	2	53.39	2	80.34
3	Lorraine McNamara / Quinn Carpenter	126.10	4	49.11	3	76.99
4	Rachel Parsons / Michael Parsons	123.26	3	50.80	4	72.46
5	Madeline Heritage / Nathaniel Fast	118.17	5	48.82	7	69.35
6	Kaitlin Hawayek / Michael Bramante	116.77	6	46.85	5	69.92
7	Amanda Bertsch / Sam Kaplun	114.28	9	44.88	6	69.40
8	Elliana Pogrebinsky / Ross Gudis	111.52	7	46.67	10	64.85
9	Jessica Mancini / Tyler Brooks	110.89	8	45.81	9	65.08
10	Roxette Howe / Mark Jahnke	108.94	10	43.33	8	65.61
11	Cassandra Jeandell / Damian Dodge	99.37	11	37.54	11	61.83
12	Danielle Gamelin / Alexander Gamelin	96.74	12	36.32	12	60.42
13	Jenna Dzierzanowski / Vinny Dispenza	76.37	13	28.07	13	48.30

== International team selections ==
=== Four Continents Championships ===
The U.S. team to the 2012 Four Continents Championships: After Abbott withdrew from the Four Continents due to injury, the assignment was given to Richard Dornbush, who finished 13th at the U.S. Championships.

	Men	Ladies	Pairs	Ice dancing
1	Jeremy Abbott	Ashley Wagner	Caydee Denney / John Coughlin	Meryl Davis / Charlie White
2	Adam Rippon	Agnes Zawadzki	Amanda Evora / Mark Ladwig	Maia Shibutani / Alex Shibutani
3	Ross Miner	Caroline Zhang	Mary Beth Marley / Rockne Brubaker	Madison Hubbell / Zachary Donohue
1st alt.	Richard Dornbush	Rachael Flatt	Gretchen Donlan / Andrew Speroff	Lynn Kriengkrairut / Logan Giulietti-Schmitt
2nd alt.	Armin Mahbanoozadeh	Mirai Nagasu	Marissa Castelli / Simon Shnapir	Madison Chock / Evan Bates
3rd alt.	Douglas Razzano	Christina Gao	Ashley Cain / Joshua Reagan	Anastasia Olson / Jordan Cowan

=== World Junior Championships ===
The U.S. team to the 2012 World Junior Championships:

	Men	Ladies	Pairs	Ice dancing
1	Jason Brown	Gracie Gold	Haven Denney / Brandon Frazier	Alexandra Aldridge / Daniel Eaton
2	Timothy Dolensky	Christina Gao	Britney Simpson / Matthew Blackmer	Lauri Bonacorsi / Travis Mager
3	Joshua Farris	Vanessa Lam	Kylie Duarte / Colin Grafton	Rachel Parsons / Michael Parsons
1st alt.	Philip Warren	Ashley Cain	Jessica Calalang / Zack Sidhu	Madeline Heritage / Nathaniel Fast
2nd alt.	Harrison Choate	Hannah Miller	Jessica Pfund / AJ Reiss	Kaitlin Hawayek / Michael Bramante
3rd alt.	Jay Yostanto	Angela Wang	Madeline Aaron / Max Settlage	Amanda Bertsch / Sam Kaplun

=== World Championships ===
The U.S. team to the 2012 World Championships:

	Men	Ladies	Pairs	Ice dancing
1	Jeremy Abbott	Ashley Wagner	Caydee Denney / John Coughlin	Meryl Davis / Charlie White
2	Adam Rippon	Alissa Czisny	Mary Beth Marley / Rockne Brubaker	Maia Shibutani / Alex Shibutani
3				Madison Hubbell / Zachary Donohue
1st alt.	Ross Miner	Agnes Zawadzki	Amanda Evora / Mark Ladwig	Lynn Kriengkrairut / Logan Giulietti-Schmitt
2nd alt.	Armin Mahbanoozadeh	Caroline Zhang	Marissa Castelli / Simon Shnapir	Madison Chock / Evan Bates
3rd alt.	Douglas Razzano	Mirai Nagasu	Gretchen Donlan / Andrew Speroff	Anastasia Cannuscio / Colin McManus
