= Matthew Blackmer =

American pair skater

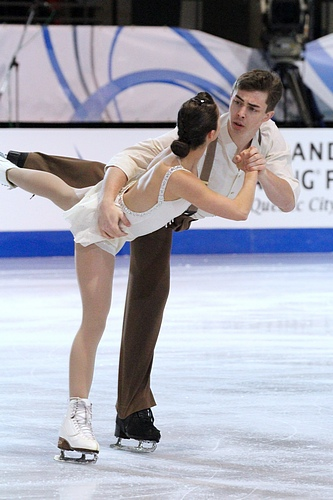
- Blackmer and Simpson in 2011

Personal information
- Born: December 12, 1991 (age 34) Findlay, Ohio, U.S.
- Home town: Detroit, Michigan, U.S.
- Height: 6 ft 0 in (1.82 m)

Figure skating career
- Country: United States
- Partner: Alexandra Aldridge
- Coach: Angelika Krylova, Pasquale Camerlengo, Natalia Denner
- Skating club: Detroit SC
- Began skating: 2003
- Retired: September 13, 2016
Medal record
Pairs' figure skating
Representing United States
Junior Grand Prix Final
Bronze medal – third place	2011–2012 Quebec	Pairs

Matthew Blackmer (born December 12, 1991, in Findlay, Ohio) is a retired American pair skater turned ice dancer. With former pairs partner Britney Simpson, he is the 2011 Junior Grand Prix Final bronze medalist, the 2012 U.S. Junior silver medalist and the 2013 U.S. Junior Champion. He also skated with ice dancer Alexandra Aldridge.

== Personal life ==
Blackmer began skating at the age of 12, having switched over from hockey. Blackmer is a graduate of Lake Orion High School in Lake Orion, Michigan.

== Career ==
Blackmer started out with Silver Blades, which is a figure skating club in Findlay, Ohio.

=== Partnership with Simpson ===
Blackmer teamed up with Simpson in February 2011 after his previous partner, Kaitlin Budd, quit. He moved from Michigan to Colorado Springs to train with Simpson under coach Dalilah Sappenfield.

In the 2011–2012 season, Simpson and Blackmer won gold at their first Junior Grand Prix event, 2011 JGP Poland, and silver at their second event, 2011 JGP Estonia. They won the bronze medal at the 2011–2012 Junior Grand Prix Final. They competed at the 2012 World Junior Championships and finished 10th.

On December 2, 2013, Simpson and Blackmer announced the end of their two-year partnership; both expressed an interest to compete with new partners.

=== Partnership with Aldridge ===
On July 31, 2015, IceNetwork announced that Blackmer had teamed up with ice dancer Alexandra Aldridge, though they had teamed up two months prior. They began work with coaches Anjelika Krylova, Pasquale Camerlengo, and Natalia Annenko-Deller, him moving to Detroit Skate Club in Bloomfield Hills, Michigan, from Broadmoor Skating Club in Colorado. He passed sixteen dance tests in one week in order to compete with her. Their first competition together was the Lake Placid Ice Dance Championships, where they placed third in the senior category, finishing fourth in the short dance and third in the free. They finished ninth at the 2016 United States National Championships.

On September 13, 2016, Blackmer and Aldridge announced the end of their one-year partnership; Aldridge looks to continue competing with a new partner while Blackmer decided to retire from competition.

== Programs ==
=== With Aldridge ===
Season	Short Dance	Free Dance	Exhibition
2015–2016	Waltz: Masquerade Waltz by Aram Khachaturian; March: Radetzky March by Johann Strauss I choreo. by Angelika Krylova, Pasquale Camerlengo	Oblivion by Astor Piazzolla; Tango de Amor (from The Addams Family) by Andrew Lippa choreo. by Angelika Krylova, Pasquale Camerlengo	Thinking Out Loud by Ed Sheeran

=== With Simpson ===
Season	Short program	Free skating	Exhibition
2013–2014	Flamenco by Didulia	Beethoven's Five Secrets by The Piano Guys	
2012–2013	The Mask of Zorro by James Horner	Henry V by Patrick Doyle	You Should Be Dancing by Bee Gees
2011–2012	Crouching Tiger, Hidden Dragon by Tan Dun	Titanic by James Horner	

== Competitive highlights ==
=== With Simpson ===
Results
International
Event	2011–2012	2012–2013
Junior Worlds	10th	10th
JGP Final	3rd	
JGP Austria		5th
JGP Estonia	2nd	
JGP Poland	1st	
JGP Germany		5th
National
U.S. Championships	2nd J.	1st J.
J. = Junior level; JGP = Junior Grand Prix
