= Ian Beharry =

Canadian pair skater

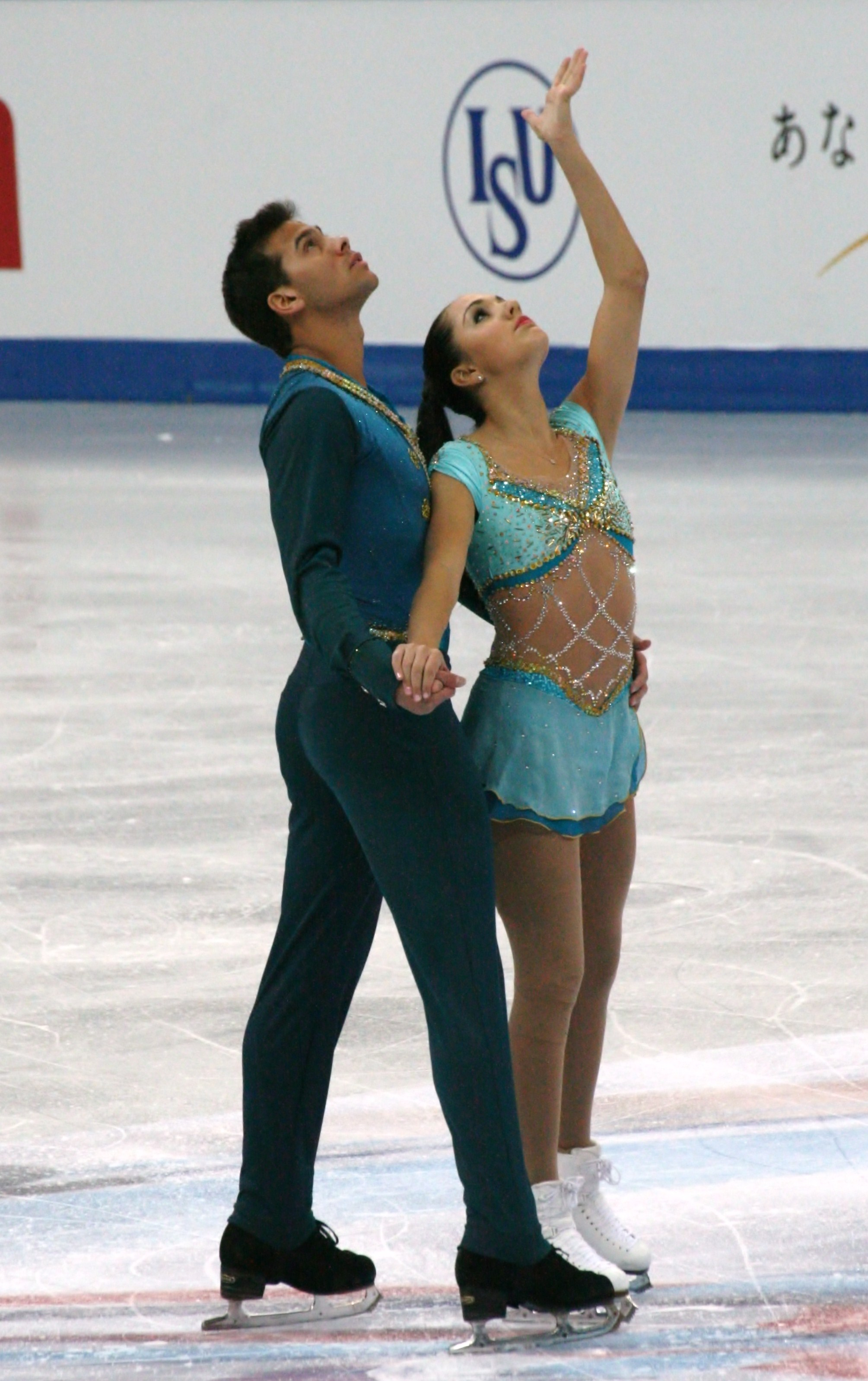
- Jones/Beharry in 2012

Personal information
- Born: November 28, 1991 (age 34) Scarborough, Ontario
- Home town: Guelph, Ontario
- Height: 1.78 m (5 ft 10 in)

Figure skating career
- Country: Canada
- Coach: Kristy Wirtz
- Skating club: Kitchener-Waterloo SC
- Began skating: 1994
Medal record
Representing Canada
Figure skating: Pairs
Junior Grand Prix Final
Silver medal – second place	2011–12 Quebec	Pairs

Ian Beharry (born November 28, 1991) is a Canadian pair skater. With former partner Katherine Bobak, he is the 2011 Junior Grand Prix Final silver medalist and the 2012 Canadian Junior champion. He then skated with Brittany Jones, finishing 6th at the 2013 World Junior Championships.

== Career ==
Early in his career, Beharry competed with Kristen Tikel and Zoey Brown.

Beharry teamed up with Katherine Bobak on February 12, 2011. In the 2011–2012 season, they won silver at their first Junior Grand Prix event in Poland and gold at their second event in Estonia, earning a berth to the 2011–12 Junior Grand Prix Final. They won the silver medal at the event and set a new Canadian junior pair record with their score of 152.65 points. Bobak and Beharry then won the 2012 Canadian Junior Championships. They finished 7th at the 2012 World Junior Championships. In April 2012, Bobak and Beharry ended their partnership.

Beharry teamed up with Brittany Jones before the 2012–13 season. They won gold and bronze medals on the JGP series and finished 6th at the JGP Final. They parted ways after finishing 6th at the 2013 World Junior Championships.

== Programs ==
=== With Jones ===
Season	Short program	Free skating
2012–2013	Black Magic Woman by Santana; Bombay Dreams by Andrew Lloyd Webber	Winter and Summer (from Four Seasons) by Antonio Vivaldi

=== With Bobak ===
Season	Short program	Free skating	Exhibition
2011–2012	I Had a Farm in Africa (from Out of Africa) by John Barry	Adagio of Spartacus and Phrygia by Aram Khachaturian	Who Wants To Live Forever by Queen

=== With Tikel ===
Season	Short program	Free skating
2010–2011	Munao Bizarro by Electro Club Tango	Warsaw Concerto by Richard Addinsell
2009–2010	Munao Bizarro by Electro Club Tango	Alexander by Vangelis: The Drums of Gaugamela; Tender Memories; Bagoa's Dance; Eternal Alexander

=== With Brown ===
Season	Short program	Free skating
2008–2009	Bari Phunky Bari by Sergio Percussions, Zulu	West Side Story by Leonard Bernstein

== Competitive highlights ==
=== With Jones ===
International
Event	2012–13
World Junior Championships	6th
ISU Junior Grand Prix Final	6th
ISU Junior Grand Prix in Austria	1st
ISU Junior Grand Prix in Germany	3rd
National
Canadian Championships	4th

=== With Bobak ===
International
Event	2011–2012
World Junior Championships	7th
ISU Junior Grand Prix Final	2nd
ISU Junior Grand Prix in Estonia	1st
ISU Junior Grand Prix in Poland	2nd
National
Canadian Championships	1st J.
J. = Junior level

=== With Tikel ===
International
Event	2009–10	2010–11
ISU Junior Grand Prix in Austria		10th
ISU Junior Grand Prix in Belarus	9th	
ISU Junior Grand Prix in Germany		5th
National
Canadian Championships	6th J.	8th J.
J. = Junior level

=== With Brown ===
International
Event	2008–09
ISU Junior Grand Prix in the Czech Republic	7th
ISU Junior Grand Prix in the United Kingdom	9th
National
Canadian Championships	5th J.
J. = Junior level
