= Alexandra Aldridge =

American ice dancer

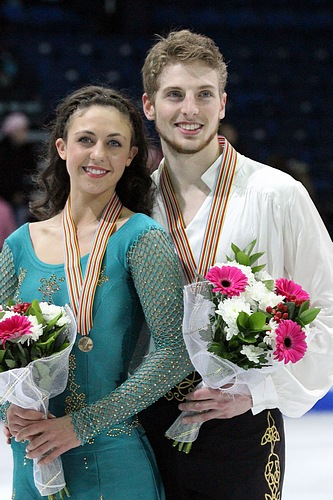
- Alexandra Aldridge and Daniel Eaton in 2012

Personal information
- Born: May 7, 1994 (age 32) Royal Oak, Michigan, U.S.
- Home town: Birmingham, Michigan, U.S.
- Height: 5 ft 5 in (1.65 m)

Figure skating career
- Country: United States
- Discipline: Ice dance
- Began skating: 1998

Medal record
Four Continents Championships
Bronze medal – third place	2014 Taipei	Ice dance
World Junior Championships
Bronze medal – third place	2012 Minsk	Ice dance
Bronze medal – third place	2013 Milan	Ice dance
Junior Grand Prix Final
Bronze medal – third place	2012–13 Sochi	Ice dance

Alexandra Aldridge (born May 7, 1994) is an American ice dancer. With former partner Daniel Eaton, she is the 2014 Four Continents bronze medalist, a two-time (2012, 2013) World Junior bronze medalist, the 2012 JGP Final bronze medalist, and a two-time U.S. national junior champion.

== Career ==
=== Partnership with Eaton ===
Aldridge/Eaton teamed up in May 2009. In their first season together, they won the U.S. novice title. The following season, they debuted on the Junior Grand Prix series, placing 6th and 4th in France and England, respectively. They finished 5th on the junior level at the 2011 U.S. Championships.

During the 2011–12 season, Aldridge/Eaton won bronze in Latvia and silver in Austria on the Junior Grand Prix circuit. They won the junior title at the 2012 U.S. Championships. They competed at the 2012 World Junior Championships and won the bronze medal ahead of Anna Yanovskaya / Sergey Mozgov.

In 2012–13, Aldridge/Eaton won gold medals at their JGP events in Lake Placid, USA and Slovenia. Their results qualified them for the 2012–13 JGP Final in Sochi, Russia, where they won the bronze medal. They won another bronze medal at the 2013 World Junior Championships.

Aldridge/Eaton placed sixth in their senior international debut at the 2013 Ondrej Nepela Trophy and then fifth in their sole GP event, the 2013 Cup of China. They finished 5th at the 2014 U.S. Championships and were assigned to the 2014 Four Continents where they won the bronze medal. Aldridge/Eaton joined the U.S. team to the 2014 World Championships as a result of the withdrawal of Meryl Davis / Charlie White and injury to Madison Hubbell (first alternate with Zachary Donohue). They trained at the Detroit Skating Club in Bloomfield Hills, Michigan, coached by Anjelika Krylova, until the end of the season.

Aldridge/Eaton made a coaching change in July 2014, joining Marina Zueva, Massimo Scali, Johnny Johns, and Oleg Epstein at Canton, Michigan's Arctic Edge. After winning gold at the U.S. Classic, they competed at two Grand Prix events, placing sixth at the 2014 Skate Canada International and seventh at the 2014 Rostelecom Cup. They finished sixth at the 2015 U.S. Championships. They announced the end of their partnership on January 30, 2015.

In August 2017, Aldridge/Eaton resumed training together at the Detroit Skating Club, coached by Krylova and Camerlengo.

=== Partnership with Blackmer ===
On July 31, 2015, IceNetwork.com announced that Aldridge had teamed up two months earlier with former pair skater Matthew Blackmer. Anjelika Krylova, Pasquale Camerlengo, and Natalia Annenko-Deller served as their coaches. Blackmer passed sixteen dance tests in one week in order to compete with her. Their first competition together was the Lake Placid Ice Dance Championships, where they placed third in the senior category, finishing fourth in the short dance and third in the free. They finished ninth at the 2016 U.S. Championships.

On September 13, 2016, Aldridge and Blackmer announced the end of their one-year partnership; she intended to continue competing with a new partner while he decided to retire from competition.

== Programs ==
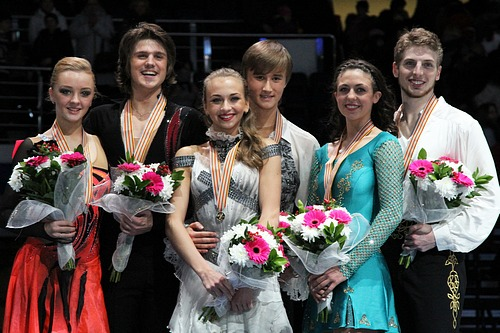
Aldrige/Eaton, bronze medalists at the 2012 World Junior Championships

=== With Blackmer ===
Season	Short Dance	Free Dance	Exhibition
2015–2016	Waltz: Masquerade Waltz by Aram Khachaturian; March: Radetzky March by Johann Strauss I choreo. by Angelika Krylova, Pasquale Camerlengo	Oblivion by Astor Piazzolla; Tango de Amor (from The Addams Family) by Andrew Lippa choreo. by Angelika Krylova, Pasquale Camerlengo	Thinking Out Loud by Ed Sheeran

=== With Eaton ===
Season	Short dance	Free dance	Exhibition
2017–2018	Volverás by Gloria Estefan; Let's Get Loud by Gloria Estefan, Kike Santander performed by Jennifer Lopez	Ain't That a Kick in the Head by Jimmy Van Heusen, Sammy Cahn performed by Robbie Williams; Mack the Knife by Kurt Weill, Bertolt Brecht performed by Robbie Williams	
2014–2015	Carmen: by Georges Bizet: Paso doble: Carmen Ouverture; Paso doble: Torreador March choreo. by Marina Zueva, Massimo Scali	Gone with the Wind: by Max Steiner: Tara's Theme performed by André Rieu; Atlanta Bazaar; Fleeing of Atlanta; Tara's Theme choreo. by Marina Zueva, Massimo Scali	
2013–2014	Quickstep: Man with the Hex; Foxtrot: The Business of Love; Swing: Hey Pachuco (from The Mask)	Secret Love by Nicos; Dhoom Taana (Om Shanti Om); Anarkli Disco (Houseful 2) Songs of 2012 Bollywood	
2012–2013	Pennsylvania 6-5000 by Brian Setzer; Down Home Blues by Gene Harris	Fiddler on the Roof by Isaac Stern	
2011–2012	I Need to Know by Marc Anthony; Mambo No. 8 performed by The Mambo Kings Orchestra	Lord of the Dance by Ronan Hardiman	Proud Mary performed by Ike & Tina Turner
2010–2011	Falling in Love with Love (from The Boys from Syracuse) by Richard Rodgers, Lorenz Hart; Let's Face the Music and Dance by Irving Berlin	Dramatico by Edvin Marton	
	Original dance		
2009–2010		The Man in the Iron Mask performed by Bruce Fowler, Suzette Moriarty, Ladd McIntosh and Walt Fowler	

== Competitive highlights ==
GP: Grand Prix; CS: Challenger Series; JGP: Junior Grand Prix

=== With Eaton ===
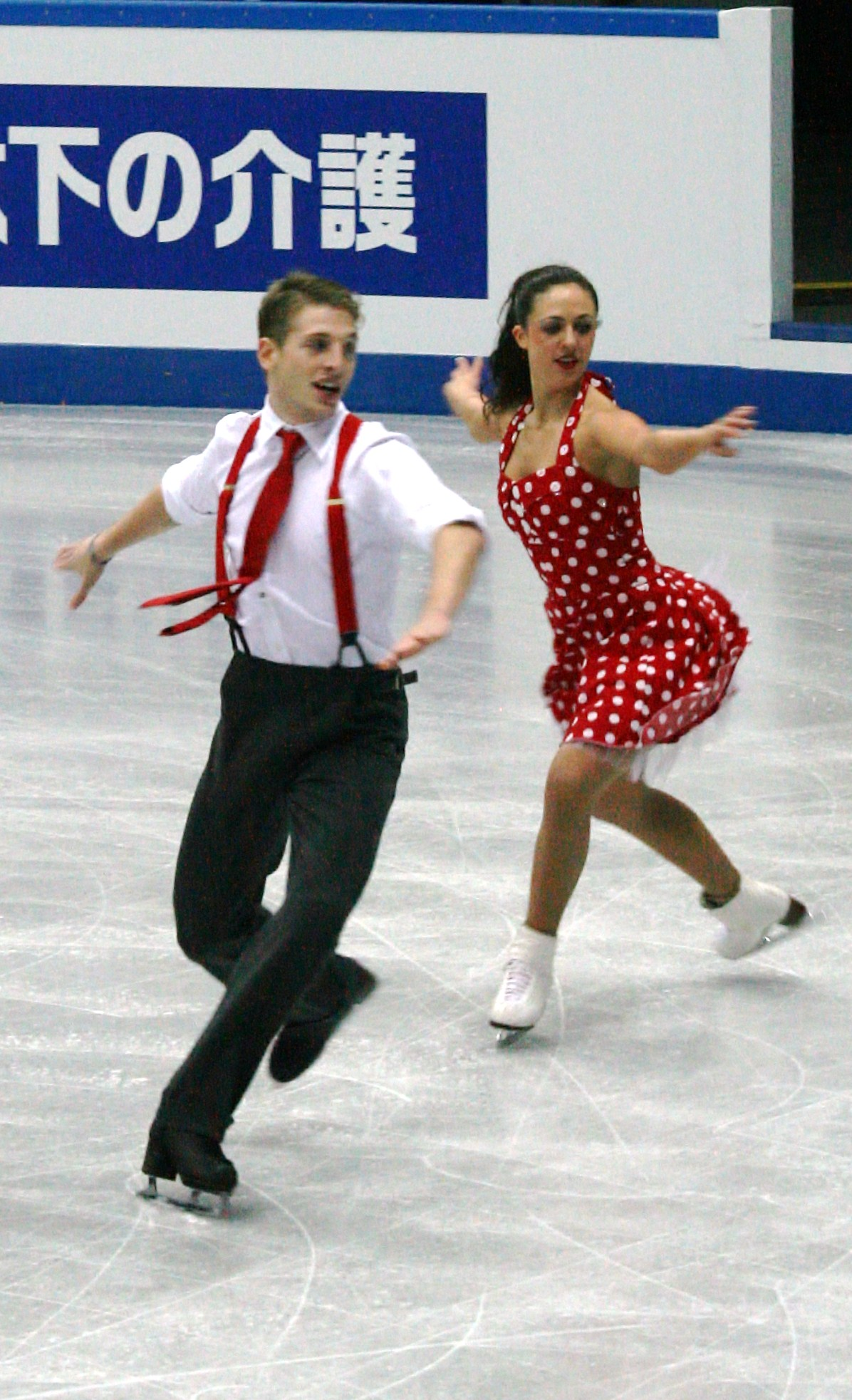
Aldridge/Eaton perform their short dance at the 2012–13 JGP Final

International
Event	10–11	11–12	12–13	13–14	14–15	17–18
Worlds				17th		
Four Continents				3rd		
GP Cup of China				5th		
GP Rostel. Cup					7th	
GP Skate Canada					6th	
CS U.S. Classic					1st	
Nepela Trophy				6th		
International: Junior
Junior Worlds		3rd	3rd			
JGP Final		4th	3rd			
JGP Austria		2nd				
JGP France	6th					
JGP Latvia		3rd				
JGP Slovenia			1st			
JGP U.K.	4th					
JGP U.S.			1st			
National
U.S. Champ.	5th J	1st J	1st J	5th	6th	8th
Levels: N = Novice; J = Junior

=== With Blackmer ===
National
Event	2015–2016
U.S. Championships	9th
