= Daniel Eaton (figure skater) =

American ice dancer (born 1992)

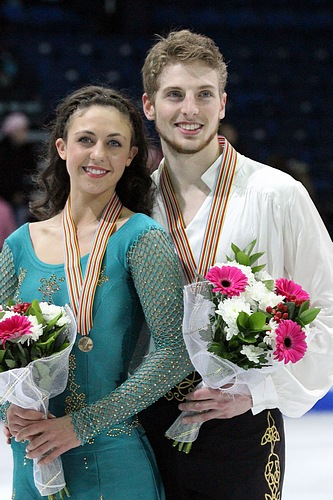
- Alexandra Aldridge and Daniel Eaton in 2012

Personal information
- Born: March 26, 1992 (age 34) Titusville, Florida, U.S.
- Home town: Bloomfield Hills, Michigan, U.S.
- Height: 5 ft 10 in (1.78 m)

Figure skating career
- Country: South Korea (since 2018); United States (2009–18)
- Discipline: Ice dance
- Partner: Yura Min
- Coach: Igor Shpilband; Pasquale Camerlengo; Adrienne Lenda; Natalia Deller; Charlie White
- Skating club: Detroit Skating Club
- Began skating: 1997
Representing South Korea
South Korean Championships
Gold medal – first place	2020 Uijeongbu	Ice dance
Representing United States
Four Continents Championships
Bronze medal – third place	2014 Taipei	Ice dance
World Junior Championships
Bronze medal – third place	2012 Minsk	Ice dance
Bronze medal – third place	2013 Milan	Ice dance
Junior Grand Prix Final
Bronze medal – third place	2012–13 Sochi	Ice dance

Daniel Eaton (born March 26, 1992) is an American ice dancer who now represents the Republic of Korea with his partner Yura Min, with whom he is the 2020 Korean National Champion. With former partner Alexandra Aldridge, he is the 2014 Four Continents bronze medalist, a two-time (2012, 2013) World Junior bronze medalist, the 2012 JGP Final bronze medalist, a two-time U.S. national junior champion and the 2010 U.S. national novice champion.

== Early years ==
Eaton competed on the novice level with Sameena Sheikh at the 2009 U.S. Championships. She retired after the event due to injury.

== Partnership with Aldridge ==
Eaton teamed up with Alexandra Aldridge in May 2009. In their first season together, they won the U.S. novice title. The following season, they debuted on the Junior Grand Prix series, placing 6th and 4th in France and England, respectively. They finished 5th on the junior level at the 2011 U.S. Championships.

During the 2011–12 season, Aldridge/Eaton won bronze in Latvia and silver in Austria on the Junior Grand Prix circuit. They won the junior title at the 2012 U.S. Championships. They competed at the 2012 World Junior Championships and won the bronze medal ahead of Anna Yanovskaya / Sergey Mozgov.

In 2012–13, Aldridge/Eaton won gold medals at their JGP events in Lake Placid, USA and Slovenia. Their results qualified them for the 2012–13 JGP Final in Sochi, Russia, where they won the bronze medal. They won another bronze medal at the 2013 World Junior Championships.

Aldridge/Eaton placed sixth in their senior international debut at the 2013 Ondrej Nepela Trophy and then fifth in their sole GP event, the 2013 Cup of China. They finished 5th at the 2014 U.S. Championships and were assigned to the 2014 Four Continents where they won the bronze medal. Aldridge/Eaton joined the U.S. team to the 2014 World Championships as a result of the withdrawal of Meryl Davis / Charlie White and injury to Madison Hubbell (first alternate with Zachary Donohue). They trained at the Detroit Skating Club in Bloomfield Hills, Michigan, coached by Anjelika Krylova, until the end of the season.

Aldridge/Eaton made a coaching change in July 2014, joining Marina Zueva, Massimo Scali, Johnny Johns, and Oleg Epstein at Canton, Michigan's Arctic Edge. After winning gold at the U.S. Classic, they competed at two Grand Prix events, placing sixth at the 2014 Skate Canada International and seventh at the 2014 Rostelecom Cup. They finished sixth at the 2015 U.S. Championships. They announced the end of their partnership on January 30, 2015.

In August 2017, Aldridge/Eaton resumed training together at the Detroit Skating Club, coached by Krylova and Camerlengo.

== Partnership with Thomas ==
In mid-March 2015, Eaton and Danielle Thomas announced they had formed a partnership, based in Canton, Michigan.

== Partnership with Min ==
On September 22, 2018, Eaton announced a new partnership with South Korean ice dancer Yura Min. Min/Eaton began their partnership competing in several minor competitions, and two Challengers, placing ninth at both the 2019 CS Nebelhorn Trophy and the 2019 CS Golden Spin of Zagreb. After winning the South Korean national title, they placed eighth at the 2020 Four Continents Championships. They were assigned to make their World Championship debut, but the COVID-19 pandemic resulted in that event's cancellation.

Due to Eaton suffering from back problems, Min and Eaton did not compete during the 2020–21 season.

Min/Eaton initially planned to skate their rhythm dance to a medley of Queen songs, but after receiving critiques from judges at the Lake Placid Ice Dance International as to whether it suited the street dance theme, they changed it to a Macklemore theme. They two competed at the 2021 CS Nebelhorn Trophy, seeking to qualify a place for South Korea at the 2022 Winter Olympics, but came seventh at the event and were named only the second reserve.

== Programs ==
=== With Yura Min ===
Season	Rhythm dance	Free dance
2021–2022	Blues: Down by Marian Hill; Hip Hop: Thrift Shop by Macklemore	I Dreamed a Dream; One Day More (from Les Misérables) by Claude-Michel Schönberg, Alain Boublil, Herbert Kretzmer
2019–2020	Quickstep: 42nd Street; Blues: 42nd Street; Quickstep: 42nd Street by Harry Warren	Love is a Bitch by Two Feet; Nemesis by Benjamin Clementine

=== With Thomas ===
Season	Short dance	Free dance
2015–2016	Cinderella by Rodgers and Hammerstein	Czardas by Zoltan Maga performed by Sonia Lee

=== With Aldridge ===
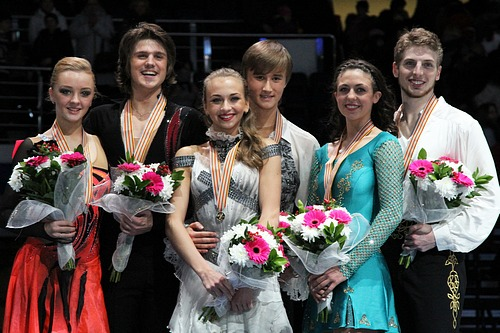
Aldridge/Eaton, bronze medalists at the 2012 World Junior Championships

Season	Short dance	Free dance	Exhibition
2017–2018	Volverás by Gloria Estefan; Let's Get Loud by Gloria Estefan, Kike Santander performed by Jennifer Lopez	Ain't That a Kick in the Head by Jimmy Van Heusen, Sammy Cahn performed by Robbie Williams; Mack the Knife by Kurt Weill, Bertolt Brecht performed by Robbie Williams	
2014–2015	Carmen by Georges Bizet; Paso doble: Carmen Ouverture; Paso doble: Torreador March choreo. by Marina Zueva, Massimo Scali	Gone with the Wind by Max Steiner; Tara's Theme performed by André Rieu; Atlanta Bazaar; Fleeing of Atlanta; Tara's Theme choreo. by Marina Zueva, Massimo Scali	
2013–2014	Quickstep: Man with the Hex; Foxtrot: The Business of Love; Swing: Hey Pachuco (from The Mask)	Secret Love by Nicos; Dhoom Taana (Om Shanti Om); Anarkli Disco (Houseful 2) Songs of 2012 Bollywood	
2012–2013	Pennsylvania 6-5000 by Brian Setzer; Down Home Blues by Gene Harris	Fiddler on the Roof by Isaac Stern	
2011–2012	I Need to Know by Marc Anthony; Mambo No. 8 performed by The Mambo Kings Orchestra	Lord of the Dance by Ronan Hardiman	Proud Mary performed by Ike & Tina Turner
2010–2011	Falling in Love with Love (from The Boys from Syracuse) by Richard Rodgers, Lorenz Hart; Let's Face the Music and Dance by Irving Berlin	Dramatico by Edvin Marton	
	Original dance		
2009–2010		The Man in the Iron Mask performed by Bruce Fowler, Suzette Moriarty, Ladd McIntosh and Walt Fowler	

== Competitive highlights ==
GP: Grand Prix; CS: Challenger Series; JGP: Junior Grand Prix

=== With Yura Min for South Korea ===
International
Event	19–20	20–21	21–22
Worlds	C	WD	
Four Continents	8th		
CS Lombardia Trophy			WD
CS Nebelhorn Trophy	9th		7th
CS Ondrej Nepela Trophy	9th		
Bosphorous Cup	5th		
Lake Placid IDI	7th		6th
Mezzaluna Cup	4th		
Santa Claus Cup	4th		
U.S. Classic			4th
National
South Korean Champ.	1st		
TBD = Assigned; WD = Withdrew; C = Event cancelled

=== With Aldridge for the United States ===
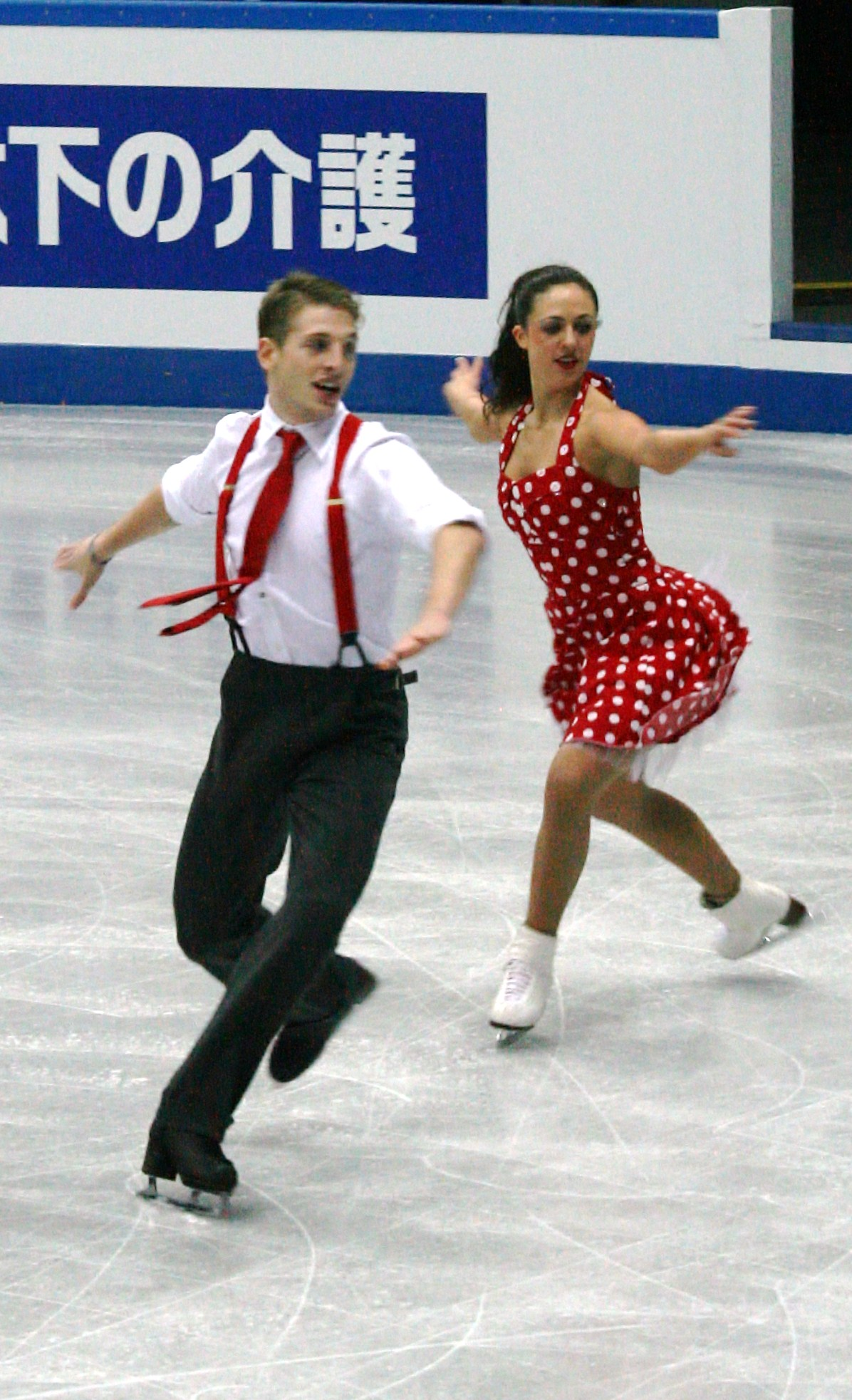
Aldridge/Eaton perform their short dance at the 2012–13 JGP Final

International
Event	10–11	11–12	12–13	13–14	14–15	17–18
Worlds				17th		
Four Continents				3rd		
GP Cup of China				5th		
GP Rostel. Cup					7th	
GP Skate Canada					6th	
CS U.S. Classic					1st	
Nepela Trophy				6th		
International: Junior
Junior Worlds		3rd	3rd			
JGP Final		4th	3rd			
JGP Austria		2nd				
JGP France	6th					
JGP Latvia		3rd				
JGP Slovenia			1st			
JGP U.K.	4th					
JGP U.S.			1st			
National
U.S. Champ.	5th J	1st J	1st J	5th	6th	8th
Levels – N: Novice; J: Junior

=== With Thomas ===
International
Event	2015–16	2016–17
CS Ice Challenge	1st	
CS U.S. Classic	5th	8th
Autumn Classic	4th	
Lake Placid IDI	2nd	
National
U.S. Championships	6th	
