= Figure skating at the 2014 Winter Olympics – Team event =

Team event at the XXII Olympic Winter Games
- Venue: Iceberg Skating Palace; Sochi, Russia
- Dates: 6–9 February 2014
- Competitors: 10 teams from 10 nations
- Winning score: 75 points

Medalists
1st place, gold medalist(s)		Russia; Evgeni Plushenko, Yulia Lipnitskaya, Tatiana Volosozhar, Maxim Trankov, Ksenia Stolbova, Fedor Klimov, Ekaterina Bobrova, Dmitri Soloviev, Elena Ilinykh, Nikita Katsalapov
2nd place, silver medalist(s)		Canada; Patrick Chan, Kevin Reynolds, Kaetlyn Osmond, Meagan Duhamel, Eric Radford, Kirsten Moore-Towers, Dylan Moscovitch, Tessa Virtue, Scott Moir
3rd place, bronze medalist(s)		United States; Jeremy Abbott, Jason Brown, Ashley Wagner, Gracie Gold, Marissa Castelli, Simon Shnapir, Meryl Davis, Charlie White

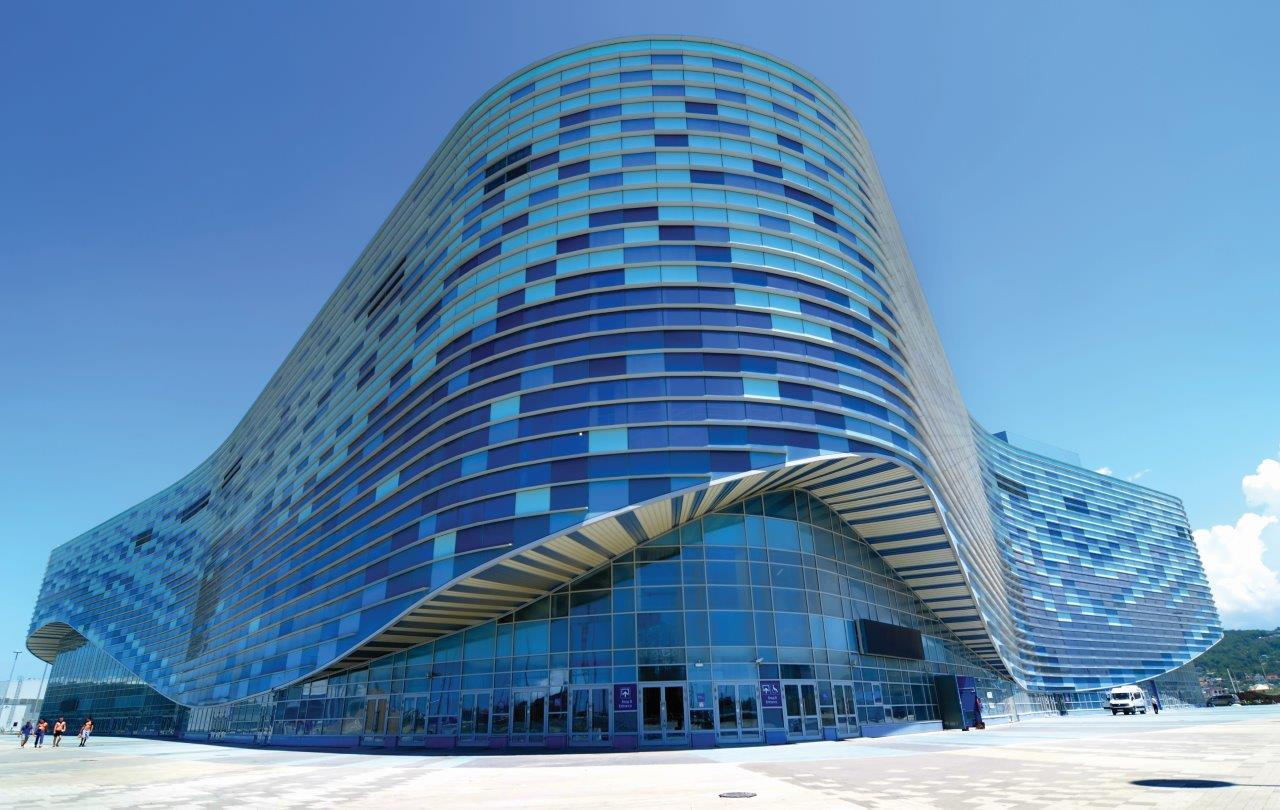
The figure skating events at the 2014 Winter Olympics were held at the Iceberg Skating Palace in Sochi, Russia.

The figure skating team event debuted at the 2014 Winter Olympics and was held from 6 to 9 February 2014 at the Iceberg Skating Palace in Sochi, Russia. The team event consisted of competitions in men's singles, women's singles, pair skating, and ice dance. Skaters and teams earned points based on their placements in each event, and the medalists were determined based on the total points earned. Ultimately, the team from Russia won the gold, the team from Canada won the silver, and the team from the United States won the bronze. During the course of the competition, Meryl Davis and Charlie White of the United States set a new world record score in the free dance.

== Background ==
The team event is the newest Olympic figure skating event and was first contested at the 2014 Winter Olympics. The event combines the four Olympic figure skating disciplines (men's singles, women's singles, pair skating, and ice dance) into a single event; skaters earn points based on their placement in each discipline, and the gold medals are awarded to the team that earns the most placement points.

The figure skating team event was one of five figure skating competitions contested at the 2014 Winter Olympics in Sochi, Russia. It was held at the Iceberg Skating Palace over three days between 6 and 9 February. The team from Canada was seen as likely medalists. With seventeen skaters, Canada sported the largest contingent of figure skaters at the 2014 Winter Olympics. The Canadian contingent included Tessa Virtue and Scott Moir, who had won the gold medals in ice dance at the 2010 Winter Olympics; Meagan Duhamel and Eric Radford in pairs, and Patrick Chan, a three-time world champion. Chan was also a two-time Four Continents champion and seven-time Canadian national champion. Duhamel and Radford had won the bronze at the 2013 World Championships, gold at the 2013 Four Continents Championships, and were three-time Canadian national champions. In addition to their 2010 Olympic victory, Virtue and Moir were two-time world champions, two-time Four Continents champions, and six-time Canadian national champions.

The team from Russia was seen as the Canadians' strongest competition. Evgeni Plushenko had won the gold medal at the 2006 Winter Olympics, silver medals at the 2002 and 2010 Winter Olympics, and was a three-time world champion, seven-time European champion, and ten-time Russian national champion. However, the decision to select Plushenko for the Olympic team was seen as controversial by many in Russia, especially as he had lost the 2014 Russian Figure Skating Championships to Maxim Kovtun. Russia only qualified one man to the 2014 Winter Olympics, and could not submit one skater to compete in the team event and another in the men's individual event. Plushenko was ultimately chosen for the Olympic team after skating for members of the selection committee behind closed doors.

== Qualification ==
For the team event, scores from the 2013 World Championships and the 2013–14 Grand Prix of Figure Skating season were tabulated to establish the top ten nations. For a nation to qualify for the team event, it had to have qualified entrants in at least three of the four disciplines (men's singles, women's singles, pair skating, or ice dance). If there were not ten nations that had qualified entrants in all four disciplines, nations with only three entrants could use the ISU's "Additional Athletes Quota" to complete their team. These additional athletes were eligible to compete in the team event but not in the individual Olympic figure skating events.

Qualification for figure skating team event
Pl.	Nation	M	W	P	D	Total
1	Canada	Yes	Yes	Yes	Yes	6053
2	Russia	Yes	Yes	Yes	Yes	5459
3	United States	Yes	Yes	Yes	Yes	5274
4	Japan	Yes	Yes	(Note: Japan did not originally qualify a pairs team for the 2014 Winter Olympics. However, when Estonia relinquished their quota spot, it was re-allocated to Japan, so Japan did not need to use an "Additional Athlete Quota" to complete their team.)	Yes	4062
5	Italy	Yes	Yes	Yes	Yes	3707
6	France	Yes	Yes	Yes	Yes	3626
7	China	Yes	Yes	Yes	Yes	3609
8	Germany	Yes	Yes	Yes	Yes	3596
9	Ukraine	Yes	Yes	Yes	Yes	1528
10	Great Britain	(Note: Matthew Parr of Great Britain competed in the team event, but not the men's individual event.)	Yes	Yes	Yes	1261

== Entries ==
Code key

- SP – Short program
- FS – Free skate
- SD – Short dance
- FD – Free dance

Member nations submitted the following entrants for the indicated segments in each discipline.

Team event entrants
Country	Men	Women	Pairs	Ice dance	Ref.
Canada	Patrick Chan (SP)	Kaetlyn Osmond (SP/FS)	Meagan Duhamel; Eric Radford; (SP)	Tessa Virtue; Scott Moir; (SD/FD)	
Canada	Kevin Reynolds (FS)	—N/a	Kirsten Moore-Towers; Dylan Moscovitch; (FS)	—N/a	
China	Yan Han (SP)	Zhang Kexin (SP)	Peng Cheng; Zhang Hao; (SP)	Huang Xintong; Zheng Xun; (SD)	
France	Florent Amodio (SP)	Maé-Bérénice Méité (SP)	Vanessa James; Morgan Ciprès; (SP)	Nathalie Péchalat; Fabian Bourzat; (SD)	
Germany	Peter Liebers (SP)	Nathalie Weinzierl (SP)	Maylin Wende; Daniel Wende; (SP)	Nelli Zhiganshina; Alexander Gazsi; (SD)	
Great Britain	Matthew Parr (SP)	Jenna McCorkell (SP)	Stacey Kemp; David King; (SP)	Penny Coomes; Nicholas Buckland; (SD)	
Italy	Paul Bonifacio Parkinson (SP/FS)	Carolina Kostner (SP)	Stefania Berton; Ondřej Hotárek; (SP/FS)	Anna Cappellini; Luca Lanotte; (SD)	
Italy	—N/a	Valentina Marchei (FS)	—N/a	Charlène Guignard; Marco Fabbri; (FD)	
Japan	Yuzuru Hanyu (SP)	Mao Asada (SP)	Narumi Takahashi; Ryuichi Kihara; (SP/FS)	Cathy Reed; Chris Reed; (SD/FD)	
Japan	Tatsuki Machida (FS)	Akiko Suzuki (FS)	—N/a		
Russia	Evgeni Plushenko (SP/FS)	Yulia Lipnitskaya (SP/FS)	Tatiana Volosozhar; Maxim Trankov; (SP)	Ekaterina Bobrova; Dmitri Soloviev; (SD)	
Russia	—N/a		Ksenia Stolbova; Fedor Klimov; (FS)	Elena Ilinykh; Nikita Katsalapov; (FD)	
Ukraine	Yakov Godorozha (SP)	Natalia Popova (SP)	Julia Lavrentieva; Yuri Rudyk; (SP)	Siobhan Heekin-Canedy; Dmitri Dun; (SD)	
United States	Jeremy Abbott (SP)	Ashley Wagner (SP)	Marissa Castelli; Simon Shnapir; (SP/FS)	Meryl Davis; Charlie White; (SD/FD)	
United States	Jason Brown (FS)	Gracie Gold (FS)	—N/a		

== Required performance elements ==
=== Single skating ===
Men competing in the team event performed their short programs on 6 February, while women performed theirs on 8 February. Lasting no more than 2 minutes 50 seconds, the short program had to include the following elements:

For men: one double or triple Axel; one triple or quadruple jump immediately preceded by connecting steps; one jump combination consisting of a double jump and a triple jump, two triple jumps, or a quadruple jump and a double or triple jump; one flying spin; one camel spin or sit spin with a change of foot; one spin combination with a change of foot; and a step sequence using the full ice surface.

For women: one double or triple Axel; one triple jump immediately preceded by connecting steps; one jump combination consisting of a double jump and a triple jump, or two triple jumps; one layback spin, sideways leaning spin, camel spin, or sit spin without a change of foot; one spin combination with a change of foot; and a step sequence using the full ice surface.

The five teams with the most points after the first round advanced to the final round. Regardless of their scores in the short program, the men and women from the top five teams performed their free skates on 9 February.

For men: Lasting 4 minutes 30 seconds (+/− 10 seconds), the free skate for men had to include the following: eight jump elements, of which one had to be an Axel-type jump; three spins, of which one had to be a spin combination, one a flying spin, and one a spin with only one position; a step sequence; and a choreographic sequence.

For women: Lasting 4 minutes (+/− 10 seconds), the free skate for women had to include the following: seven jump elements, of which one had to be an Axel-type jump; three spins, of which one had to be a spin combination, one a flying spin, and one a spin with only one position; a step sequence; and a choreographic sequence.

=== Pair skating ===
Pairs competing in the team event performed their short programs on 6 February. Lasting no more than 2 minutes 50 seconds, the short program had to include the following elements: one lasso lift, one double or triple twist lift, one double or triple throw jump, one double or triple solo jump, one pair spin combination with a change of foot, one death spiral, and a step sequence using the full ice surface.

The five teams with the most points after the first round advanced to the final round. Regardless of their scores in the short program, the couples from the top five teams performed their free skates on 8 February. Lasting 4 minutes 30 seconds (+/− 10 seconds), the free skate had to include the following: three pair lifts, one twist lift, two different throw jumps, one solo jump, one jump combination or sequence, one solo spin combination, one pair spin combination, one death spiral, and a choreographic sequence.

=== Ice dance ===
Ice dance couples competing in the team event performed their short dances on 8 February. The required rhythm was the quickstep, but teams could also include one or two of the following: the foxtrot, the Charleston, or the swing. Lasting 2 minutes 50 seconds (+/− 10 seconds), the short dance had to include the following elements: two sections of the Finnstep, one dance lift, one step sequence while not in hold, and one set of sequential twizzles.

The five teams with the most points after the first round advanced to the final round. Regardless of their scores in the short dance, the couples from the top five teams performed their free dances on 9 February. Lasting 4 minutes (+/− 10 seconds), the free dance had to include the following: two short lifts and one long lift, or four short lifts and one choreographic dance lift; one dance spin; one straight-line step sequence while in hold; one curved step sequence while in hold; and one set of synchronized twizzles.

== Judging ==
Skaters were judged according to the required technical elements of their program (such as jumps and spins), as well as the overall presentation of their program, based on five program components (skating skills, transitions, performance/execution, composition/choreography, and musical interpretation). Each technical element in a figure skating performance was assigned a predetermined base point value and scored by a panel of nine judges on a scale from –3 to +3 based on the quality of its execution. Each Grade of Execution (GOE) from –3 to +3 was assigned a value as indicated on the Scale of Values. For example, a triple Axel was worth a base value of 8.50 points, and a GOE of +3 was worth 3.00 points, so a triple Axel with a GOE of +3 earned 11.50 points. The judging panel's GOE for each element was determined by calculating the trimmed mean (the average after discarding the highest and lowest scores). The panel's scores for all elements were added together to generate a Total Elements Score. At the same time, the judges evaluated each performance based on the five aforementioned program components and assigned each a score from 0.25 to 10 in 0.25-point increments. The judging panel's final score for each program component was also determined by calculating the trimmed mean. Those scores were then multiplied by the factor shown on the chart below; the results were added together to generate a total Program Component Score.

Program component factoring
Component	Short program	Free skating
Men	1.00	2.00
Women	0.80	1.60
Pairs	0.80	1.60

Ice dance program component factoring
Component	Short dance	Free dance
Skating skills	0.80	1.25
Transitions/Footwork	0.70	1.75
Performance/ Execution	0.70	1.00
Composition/ Choreography	0.80	1.00
Musical interpretation/ Timing	1.00	1.00

Deductions were applied for certain violations, such as time infractions or falls. The Total Elements Score and Program Component Score were then added together, minus any deductions, to generate a final performance score for each skater or team.

== Team event scoring ==
The ten skaters or teams in each discipline performed their short programs and short dances first, and they were judged just as they would be at any other figure skating competition. The skater or team in each discipline who received the highest score earned ten points, the next highest score earned nine points, and so on. Once all four events were held, the points earned in each event were totaled, and the five teams with the highest totals moved on to the final round. Teams could elect to substitute up to two skaters or teams at this point. The five skaters or teams in each discipline then performed their free skates and free dances, and again received scores from the judges. The skater or team in each discipline who received the highest score earned ten points, and so on. Once all four events were held, the points earned over both rounds were totaled to determine the medalists.

== Medal summary ==
Medal summary
Gold	Silver	Bronze
Russia; Evgeni Plushenko; Yulia Lipnitskaya; Tatiana Volosozhar; Maxim Trankov; Ksenia Stolbova; Fedor Klimov; Ekaterina Bobrova; Dmitri Soloviev; Elena Ilinykh; Nikita Katsalapov	Canada; Patrick Chan; Kevin Reynolds; Kaetlyn Osmond; Meagan Duhamel; Eric Radford; Kirsten Moore-Towers; Dylan Moscovitch; Tessa Virtue; Scott Moir	United States; Jeremy Abbott; Jason Brown; Ashley Wagner; Gracie Gold; Marissa Castelli; Simon Shnapir; Meryl Davis; Charlie White

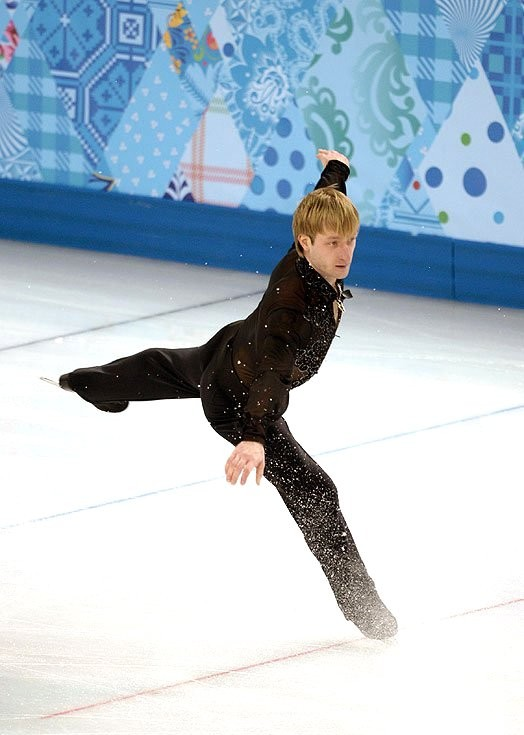
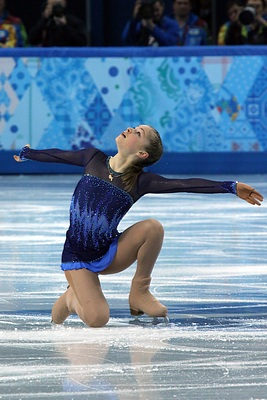
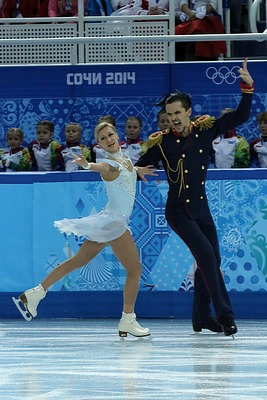
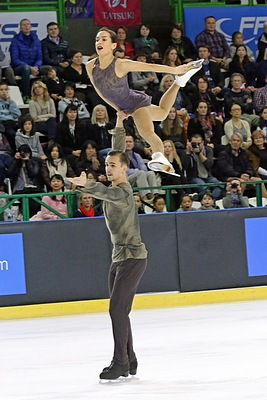
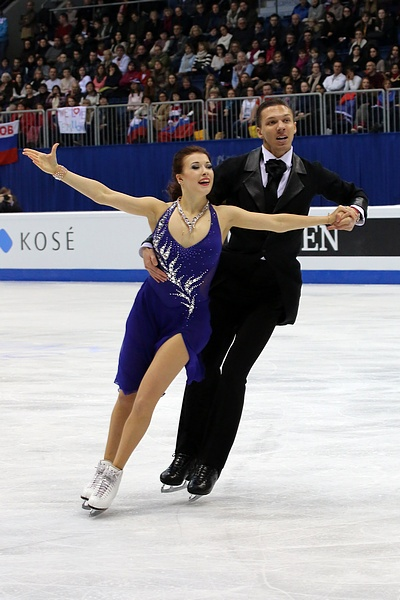
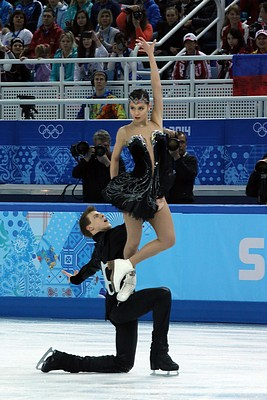
The Russian figure skating team and gold medalists from the 2014 Winter Olympics (from left to right):
Evgeni Plushenko; Yuliya Lipnitskaya; Tatiana Volosozhar and Maxim Trankov; Ksenia Stolbova and Fedor Klimov; Ekaterina Bobrova and Dmitri Soloviev; and Elena Ilinykh and Nikita Katsalapov

== Results (qualifying round) ==
Code key

- TSS – Total Segment Score
- TES – Total Elements Score
- PCS – Program Component Score
- SS – Skating skills
- TR – Transitions
- PE – Performance
- CH – Choreography/Composition
- IN – Musical interpretation
- DED – Deductions

=== Men's singles ===
The men's short program was held on 6 February 2014. Yuzuru Hanyu of Japan finished in first place, outscoring Evgeni Plushenko of Russia by over six points. The Associated Press described Hanyu's movements as more intricate, his jumps more massive, and his spins more exquisite. Plushenko opened his routine with a quadruple toe loop-triple toe loop jump combination, a triple Axel, and a triple Lutz, but slowed down considerably afterward. Plushenko spoke afterward about how much it meant for him to be able to compete at his fourth Olympics, and this time in front of a Russian audience. Patrick Chan of Canada finished in third place after struggling through his performance. Jeremy Abbott of the United States had what Philip Hersh of the Chicago Tribune described as a disastrous performance, falling to the ice and sliding into the wall on his opening quadruple jump, and landing his planned triple Axel as a single. He finished in seventh place. "This program was to be a run-through to get me ready for [the men's individual event] next week," Abbott said afterward. "I am torn up I didn't do [well] for the team.

Men's short program results
Pl.	Skater	Nation	TSS	TES	PCS	SS	TR	PE	CH	IN	DED	Pts.
1	Yuzuru Hanyu	Japan	97.98	52.55	45.43	9.18	8.96	9.11	9.04	9.14	0.00	10
2	Evgeni Plushenko	Russia	91.39	48.18	43.21	8.75	7.93	8.96	8.64	8.93	0.00	9
3	Patrick Chan	Canada	89.71	44.03	45.68	9.21	9.11	9.00	9.11	9.25	0.00	8
4	Yan Han	China	85.52	46.59	38.93	8.14	7.50	7.68	7.79	7.82	0.00	7
5	Florent Amodio	France	79.93	40.86	39.07	7.93	7.18	8.11	7.71	8.14	0.00	6
6	Peter Liebers	Germany	79.61	43.50	36.11	7.29	7.07	7.18	7.32	7.25	0.00	5
7	Jeremy Abbott	United States	65.65	27.22	39.43	8.00	7.75	7.64	8.11	7.93	1.00	4
8	Yakov Godorozha	Ukraine	60.51	32.26	28.25	5.82	5.46	5.68	5.61	5.68	0.00	3
9	Matthew Parr	Great Britain	57.40	29.71	27.69	5.68	5.36	5.61	5.54	5.50	0.00	2
10	Paul Bonifacio Parkinson	Italy	53.94	28.08	27.86	5.71	5.11	5.68	5.57	5.79	2.00	1

=== Pairs ===
The pairs short program was also held on 6 February, immediately following the men's event. Tatiana Volosozhar and Maxim Trankov of Russia delivered what Reuters described as a "rousing performance" set to Masquerade by Aram Khachaturian, scoring over ten points more than Meagan Duhamel and Eric Radford of Canada to finish in first place. Duhamel and Radford's performance was described as "nearly flawless" by Grant Robertson of The Globe and Mail. Peng Cheng and Zhang Hao of China finished in third place.

Pairs short program results
Pl.	Team	Nation	TSS	TES	PCS	SS	TR	PE	CH	IN	DED	Pts.
1	Tatiana Volosozhar; Maxim Trankov	Russia	83.79	45.10	38.69	9.57	9.39	9.68	9.86	9.86	0.00	10
2	Meagan Duhamel; Eric Radford	Canada	73.10	41.30	31.80	7.86	7.96	8.00	7.96	7.96	0.00	9
3	Peng Cheng; Zhang Hao	China	71.01	40.97	30.04	7.61	7.29	7.54	7.50	7.61	0.00	8
4	Stefania Berton; Ondřej Hotárek	Italy	70.31	38.43	31.88	7.89	7.75	8.04	8.00	8.18	0.00	7
5	Marissa Castelli; Simon Shnapir	United States	64.25	34.99	29.26	7.32	7.11	7.39	7.32	7.43	0.00	6
6	Maylin Wende; Daniel Wende	Germany	60.82	33.80	27.02	6.79	6.50	6.89	6.71	6.89	0.00	5
7	Vanessa James; Morgan Ciprès	France	57.45	30.36	28.09	7.11	6.89	6.93	7.11	7.07	1.00	4
8	Narumi Takahashi; Ryuichi Kihara	Japan	46.56	25.13	21.43	5.50	5.04	5.39	5.50	5.36	0.00	3
9	Julia Lavrentieva; Yuri Rudyk	Ukraine	46.34	25.27	21.07	5.32	5.04	5.32	5.36	5.29	0.00	2
10	Stacey Kemp; David King	Great Britain	44.70	24.44	21.26	5.32	5.14	5.36	5.36	5.39	1.00	1

=== Ice dance ===
The short dance was held on 8 February. The French newspaper L'Équipe published a story that morning citing an anonymous Russian official and alleging that the United States and Russia were in collusion to fix the results of the ice dance event in favor of Meryl Davis and Charlie White of the United States in exchange for the team event in favor of the Russians. U.S. Figure Skating categorically denied the allegation and the International Skating Union stated that it would not respond to allegations delivered anonymously and with no evidence presented. Michael Slipchuk, the high performance director for Skate Canada, responded that he was "confident that the results of the competition [would] be determined where they should be: on the ice."

Davis and White finished in first place, rescuing the American team from what had been a seventh-place standing after the first night of competition. They performed to music from My Fair Lady; their twizzles were described by Barry Wilner of the Associated Press as "so precise, it seemed as if they were one skater". Tessa Virtue and Scott Moir of Canada finished in second place after Virtue made an error on her twizzles. Marina Zoueva, the ice dance coach for both the American and Canadian teams felt the results were accurate, citing Virtue's technical error on her twizzles vis à vis Davis and White's relatively error-free performance.

Short dance results
Pl.	Team	Nation	TSS	TES	PCS	SS	TR	PE	CH	IN	DED	Pts.
1	Meryl Davis; Charlie White	United States	75.98	37.07	38.91	9.64	9.54	9.86	9.75	9.82	0.00	10
2	Tessa Virtue; Scott Moir	Canada	72.98	35.22	37.76	9.36	9.36	9.50	9.46	9.50	0.00	9
3	Ekaterina Bobrova; Dmitri Soloviev	Russia	70.27	34.22	36.05	9.00	8.75	9.18	8.89	9.18	0.00	8
4	Nathalie Péchalat; Fabian Bourzat	France	69.15	34.50	34.65	8.64	8.54	8.82	8.64	8.68	0.00	7
5	Anna Cappellini; Luca Lanotte	Italy	64.92	31.00	33.92	8.39	8.29	8.54	8.61	8.54	0.00	6
6	Nelli Zhiganshina; Alexander Gazsi	Germany	58.04	29.78	28.26	7.11	6.71	7.39	7.21	6.93	0.00	5
7	Penny Coomes; Nicholas Buckland	Great Britain	52.93	24.01	29.92	7.36	7.29	7.57	7.57	7.57	1.00	4
8	Cathy Reed; Chris Reed	Japan	52.00	25.86	26.14	6.57	6.29	6.75	6.43	6.61	0.00	3
9	Siobhan Heekin-Canedy; Dmitri Dun	Ukraine	49.19	25.79	23.40	5.93	5.75	5.75	6.11	5.71	0.00	2
10	Huang Xintong; Zheng Xun	China	47.88	23.64	24.24	6.21	5.86	6.14	6.14	5.96	0.00	1

=== Women's singles ===
The women's short program was also held on 8 February, immediately following the ice dance segment. Yulia Lipnitskaya of Russia performed what Wilner called a "near-perfect routine", writing that she "had the look of an Olympic champion". Lipnitskaya opened her routine with a triple Lutz-triple toe loop jump combination. Her performance showcased her flexibility and quick rotations on her jumps and spins. Hersh wrote that one of her spins "defied the limits of the human skeleton". Carolina Kostner of Italy finished in second place with a performance to "Ave Maria". Mao Asada of Japan finish in third place after falling on her triple Axel, while Ashley Wagner of the United States finished fourth. Wagner expressed satisfaction with her performance, feeling that she needed to prove herself after U.S. Figure Skating selected her for the Olympics despite finishing fourth at the 2014 U.S. Championships.

Women's short program results
Pl.	Skater	Nation	TSS	TES	PCS	SS	TR	PE	CH	IN	DED	Pts.
1	Yulia Lipnitskaya	Russia	72.90	39.39	33.51	8.43	8.07	8.43	8.54	8.43	0.00	10
2	Carolina Kostner	Italy	70.84	35.92	34.92	8.64	8.36	8.86	8.75	9.04	0.00	9
3	Mao Asada	Japan	64.07	31.25	33.82	8.54	8.14	8.39	8.50	8.71	1.00	8
4	Ashley Wagner	United States	63.10	32.16	30.94	7.86	7.46	7.68	7.75	7.93	0.00	7
5	Kaetlyn Osmond	Canada	62.54	33.86	28.68	7.04	6.96	7.21	7.18	7.46	0.00	6
6	Maé-Bérénice Méité	France	55.45	29.75	25.70	6.46	6.18	6.43	6.43	6.64	0.00	5
7	Zhang Kexin	China	54.58	31.75	22.83	6.04	5.39	5.71	5.79	5.61	0.00	4
8	Natalia Popova	Ukraine	53.44	27.95	25.49	6.54	6.11	6.30	6.32	6.39	0.00	3
9	Nathalie Weinzierl	Germany	52.16	28.21	24.95	6.36	5.93	6.25	6.29	6.36	1.00	2
10	Jenna McCorkell	Great Britain	50.09	26.48	23.61	5.93	5.57	6.11	5.86	6.04	0.00	1

=== Overall ===
Code key

- M-SP – Men's short program
- P-SP – Pairs short program
- D-SD – Short dance
- W-SP – Women's short program

Upon completion of the women's short program, the top five teams were cleared to move on to the second round of competition. The Russian team was in the lead with 37 points, followed by Canada, the United States, Italy, and Japan. The bottom five teams – France, China, Germany, Ukraine, and Great Britain – were eliminated from the competition.

Team event results after first round
Pl.	Nation	M-SP	P-SP	D-SD	W-SP	Pts.	Status
1	Russia	9	10	8	10	37	Advanced to final round
2	Canada	8	9	9	6	32	Advanced to final round
3	United States	4	6	10	7	27	Advanced to final round
4	Italy	1	7	6	9	23	Advanced to final round
5	Japan	10	3	3	8	24	Advanced to final round
6	France	6	4	7	5	22	Did not advance to final round
7	China	7	8	1	4	20	Did not advance to final round
8	Germany	5	5	5	2	17	Did not advance to final round
9	Ukraine	3	2	2	3	10	Did not advance to final round
10	Great Britain	2	1	4	1	8	Did not advance to final round

== Results (final round) ==
Code key

- TSS – Total Segment Score
- TES – Total Elements Score
- PCS – Program Component Score
- SS – Skating skills
- TR – Transitions
- PE – Performance
- CH – Choreography/Composition
- IN – Musical interpretation
- DED – Deductions

=== Pairs ===
The pairs free skate was also held on 8 February, immediately following the women's short program. Ksenia Stolbova and Fedor Klimov of Russia performed to music from The Addams Family and finished in first place. Kirsten Moore-Towers and Dylan Moscovitch of Canada finished in second place. The Russian team had a six-point lead over the Canadian team after the second day of competition, with the American team in third place.

Pairs free skate results
Pl.	Team	Nation	TSS	TES	PCS	SS	TR	PE	CH	IN	DED	Pts.
1	Ksenia Stolbova; Fedor Klimov	Russia	135.09	67.03	68.06	8.39	8.29	8.57	8.61	8.68	0.00	10
2	Kirsten Moore-Towers; Dylan Moscovitch	Canada	129.74	64.89	64.85	8.14	7.82	8.25	8.11	8.21	0.00	9
3	Stefania Berton; Ondřej Hotárek	Italy	120.82	60.45	61.37	7.71	7.46	7.61	7.75	7.82	1.00	8
4	Marissa Castelli; Simon Shnapir	United States	117.94	60.27	58.67	7.32	7.21	7.39	7.32	7.43	1.00	7
5	Narumi Takahashi; Ryuichi Kihara	Japan	86.33	43.86	42.47	5.54	5.04	5.36	5.29	5.32	0.00	6

=== Men's singles ===
The men's free skate was held on 9 February and was the first of three events held in a row. Vladimir Putin, the President of Russia, was present in the arena for the competition. Evgeni Plushenko of Russia finished in first place with a performance that included a quadruple toe loop. Fans showered the ice with so many bouquets and stuffed animals that it took twelve ice sweepers – the young skaters who collect gifts thrown on the ice after each performance – to collect them all. Kevin Reynolds of Canada finished in second place, successfully performing three quadruple jumps, although he had an error on his triple Axel.

Men's free skate results
Pl.	Name	Nation	TSS	TES	PCS	SS	TR	PE	CH	IN	DED	Pts.
1	Evgeni Plushenko	Russia	168.20	81.48	86.72	8.75	7.54	9.14	8.79	9.14	0.00	10
2	Kevin Reynolds	Canada	167.92	89.00	78.92	7.93	7.64	8.00	7.96	7.93	0.00	9
3	Tatsuki Machida	Japan	165.85	83.13	82.72	8.32	7.82	8.32	8.36	8.54	0.00	8
4	Jason Brown	United States	153.67	75.45	79.22	7.79	7.82	7.93	7.96	8.11	1.00	7
5	Paul Bonifacio Parkinson	Italy	121.23	66.97	56.26	5.89	5.21	5.75	5.57	5.71	2.00	6

=== Women's singles ===
The women's free skate was held on 9 February immediately following the men's event. Yulia Lipnitskaya of Russia finished in first place with her routine set to music from Schindler's List, while wearing a red coat evocative of the girl in red from Schindler's List. Michelle Kaufman of the Miami Herald wrote that Lipnitskaya demonstrated "unparalleled artistry, flexibility, and blurring spins". Lipnitskaya's routine featured ten jumps, seven in combination, and established her as the presumptive favorite heading into the women's individual event. Upon completion of the women's event, Russia's gold-medal victory was guaranteed regardless of the outcome of the ice dance event. Gracie Gold of the United States was second, and even though her routine was error-free, she still finished more than twelve points behind Lipnitskaya.

Women's free skate results
Pl.	Name	Nation	TSS	TES	PCS	SS	TR	PE	CH	IN	DED	Pts.
1	Yulia Lipnitskaya	Russia	141.51	71.69	69.82	8.64	8.43	8.86	8.82	8.89	0.00	10
2	Gracie Gold	United States	129.38	68.49	61.89	7.82	7.43	7.86	7.75	7.82	0.00	9
3	Valentina Marchei	Italy	112.51	54.00	58.51	7.21	7.04	7.50	7.32	7.50	0.00	8
4	Akiko Suzuki	Japan	112.33	49.32	63.01	8.07	7.75	7.71	7.89	7.96	0.00	7
5	Kaetlyn Osmond	Canada	110.73	54.53	57.20	7.11	6.89	7.25	7.21	7.29	1.00	6

=== Ice dance ===
The free dance was held on 9 February immediately following the women's event. Meryl Davis and Charlie White of the United States finished in first place, outscoring Tessa Virtue and Scott Moir of Canada by almost eight points. Jeff Seidel of the Detroit Free Press wrote that the matchup between the two teams offered an interesting preview of the upcoming ice dance event. Davis and White were already the reigning world champions, so their victory in the team event gave them even more momentum going into the ice dance event. Scott Hamilton, 1984 Olympic gold medalist and NBC Sports analyst, opined that Davis and White were "prepared and ready to take on anybody", and while he did not think Virtue and Moir skated their best, they would offer a stronger challenge in the ice dance event. Davis and White outscored Virtue and White in all elements, including skating skills, transitions, performance, choreography, and timing. At the same time, Virtue and Moir saw where their performance was lacking compared to that of Davis and White, and had time to make improvements.

Free dance results
Pl.	Team	Nation	TSS	TES	PCS	SS	TR	PE	CH	IN	DED	Pts.
1	Meryl Davis; Charlie White	United States	114.34	55.80	58.54	9.64	9.61	9.96	9.89	9.82	0.00	10
2	Tessa Virtue; Scott Moir	Canada	107.56	50.37	57.19	9.50	9.32	9.64	9.68	9.68	0.00	9
3	Elena Ilinykh; Nikita Katsalapov	Russia	103.48	50.36	54.12	9.00	8.68	9.25	9.25	9.18	1.00	8
4	Charlène Guignard; Marco Fabbri	Italy	81.25	41.33	39.92	6.71	6.43	6.75	6.82	6.71	0.00	7
5	Cathy Reed; Chris Reed	Japan	76.34	38.13	39.21	6.54	6.32	6.68	6.75	6.54	1.00	6

=== Overall ===
Code key

- M-SP – Men's short program
- P-SP – Pairs short program
- D-SD – Short dance
- W-SP – Women's short program
- P-FS – Pairs free skate
- M-FS – Men's free skate
- W-FS – Women's free skate
- D-FD – Free dance

Russia's gold-medal victory in the team event was its first gold medal of the 2014 Winter Olympics.

Team event results after second round
Pl.	Nation	M-SP	P-SP	D-SD	W-SP	P-FS	M-FS	W-FS	D-FD	Pts.
1st place, gold medalist(s)	Russia	9	10	8	10	10	10	10	8	75
2nd place, silver medalist(s)	Canada	8	9	9	6	9	9	6	9	65
3rd place, bronze medalist(s)	United States	4	6	10	7	7	7	9	10	60
4	Italy	1	7	6	9	8	6	8	7	52
5	Japan	10	3	3	8	6	8	7	6	51

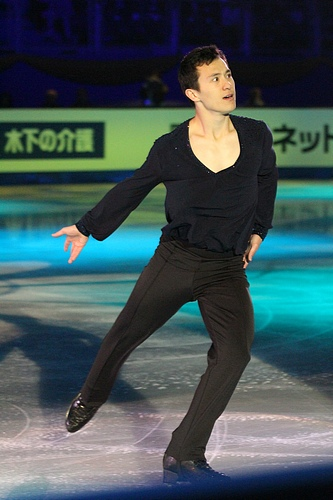
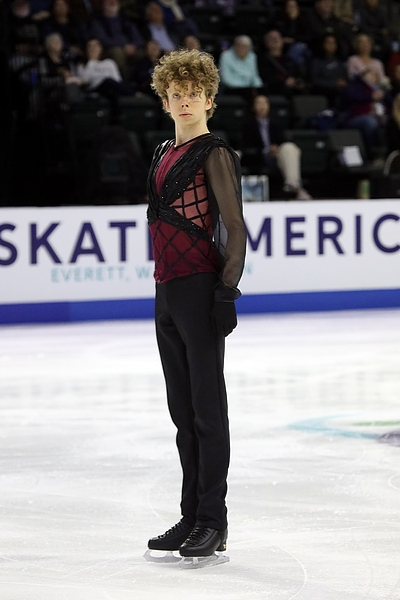
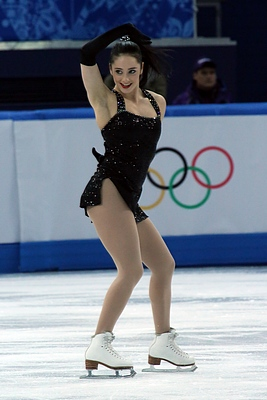
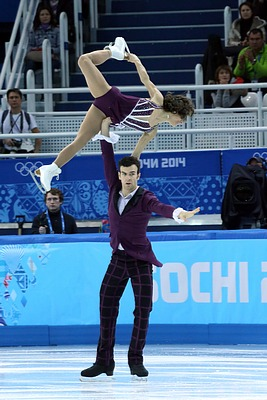
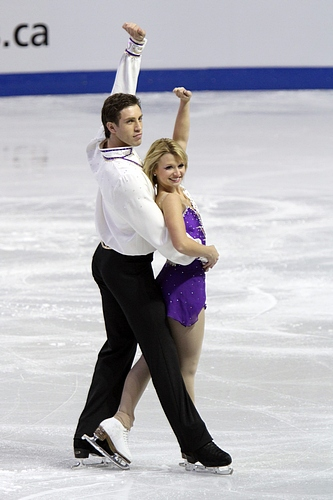
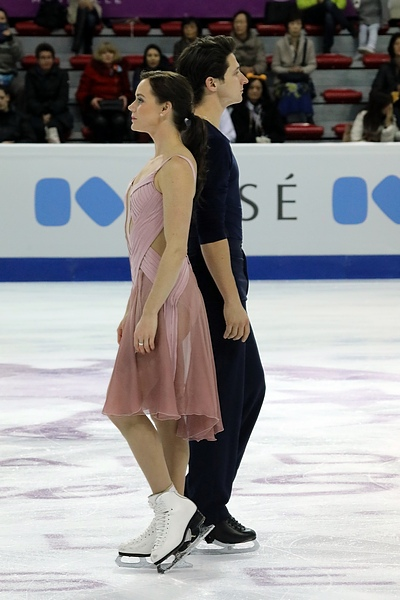
The Canadian figure skating team and silver medalists from the 2014 Winter Olympics (from left to right):
Patrick Chan; Kevin Reynolds; Kaetlyn Osmond; Meagan Duhamel and Eric Radford; Kirsten Moore-Towers and Dylan Moscovitch; and Tessa Virtue and Scott Moir
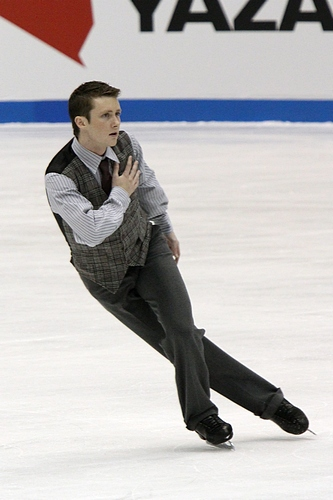
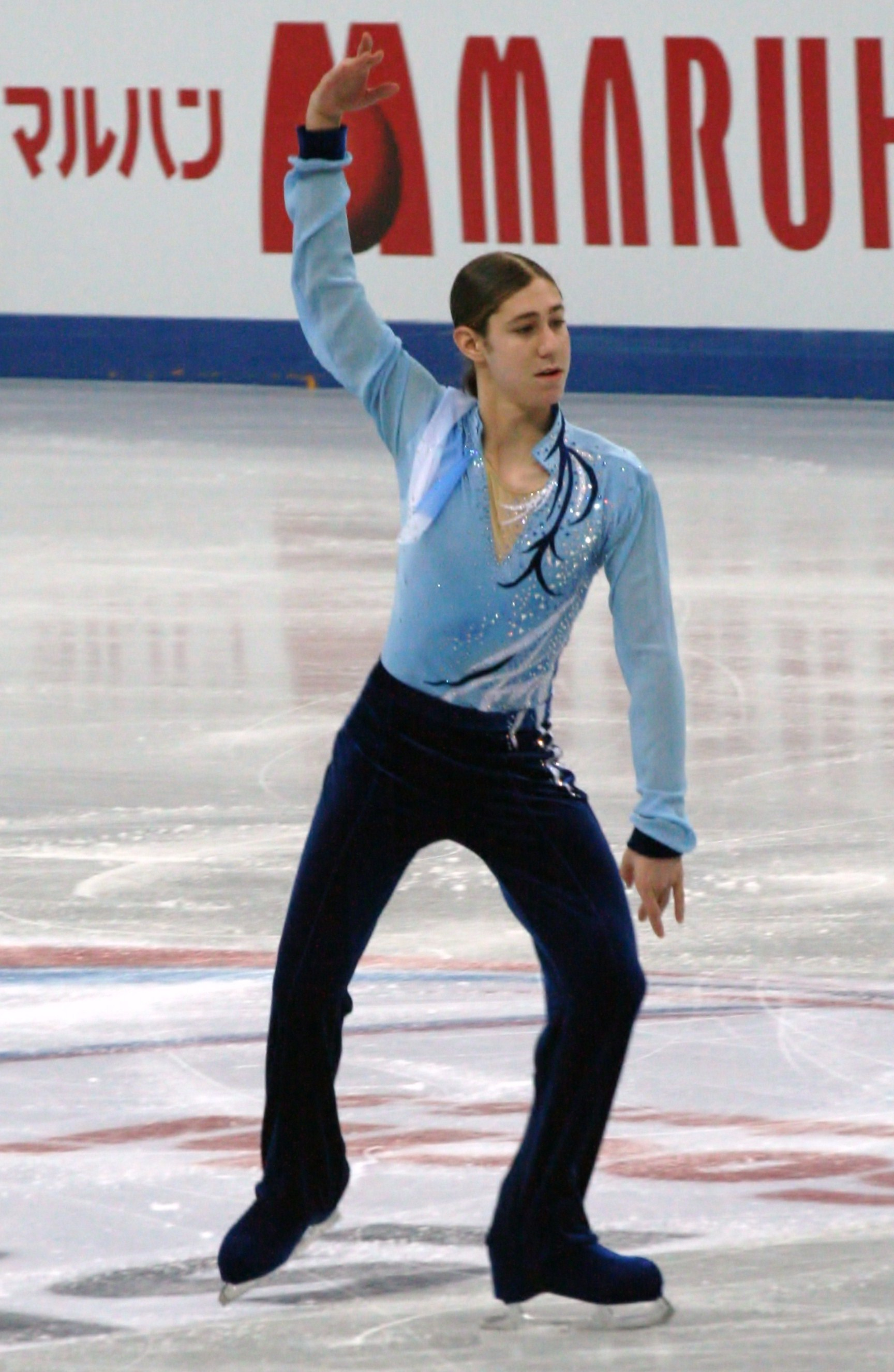
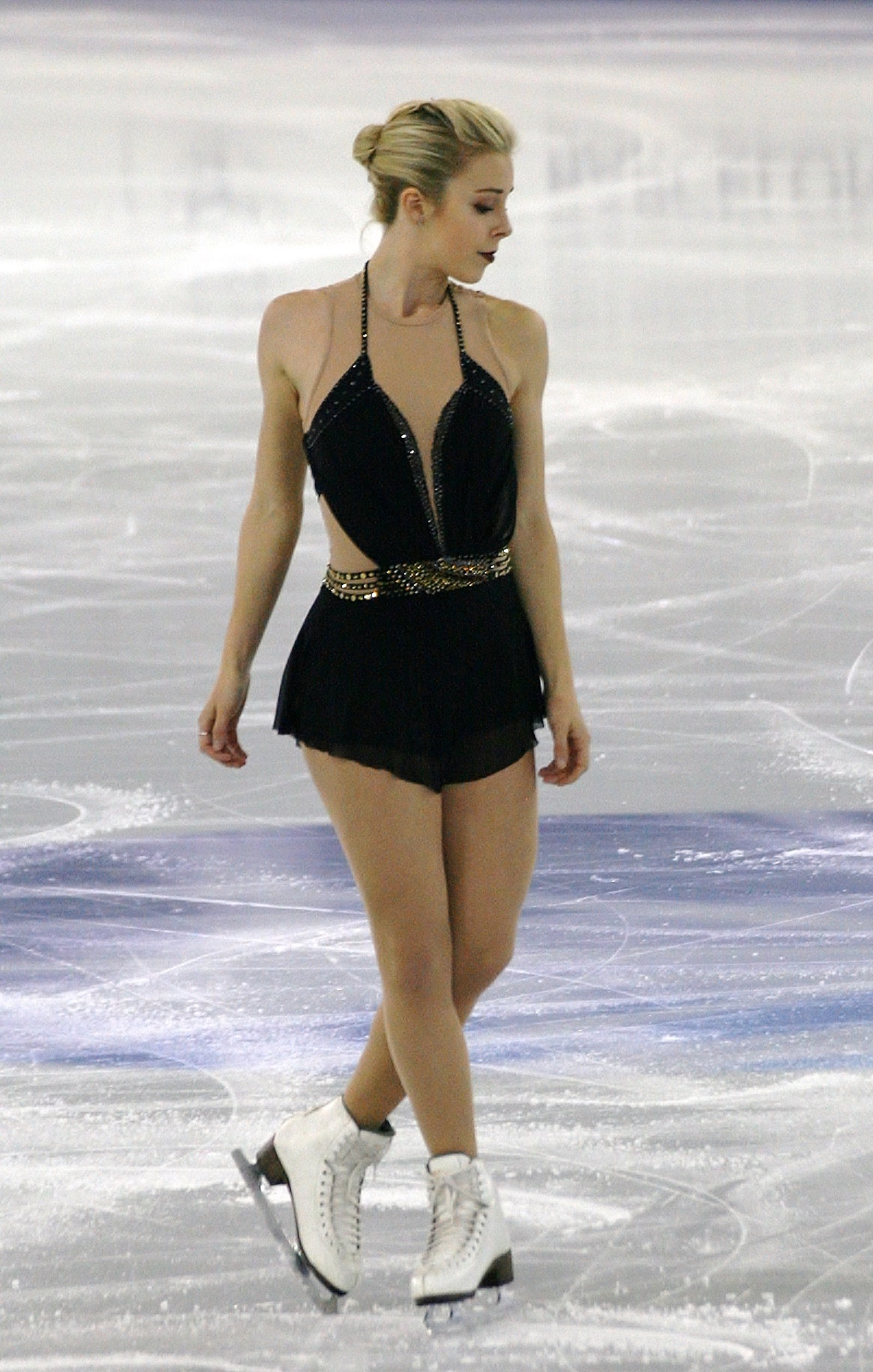
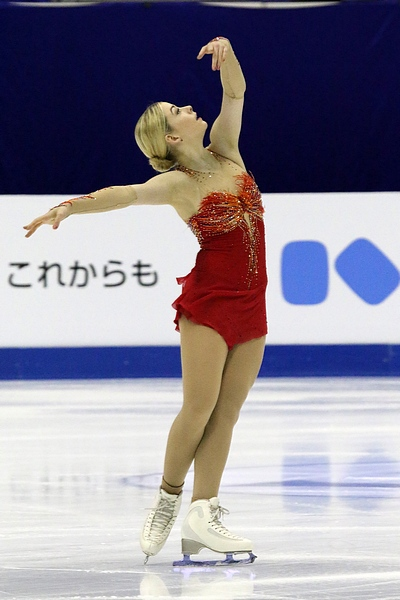
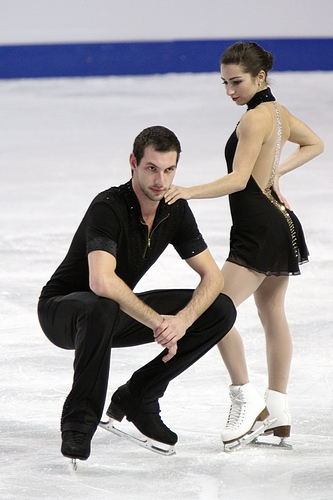
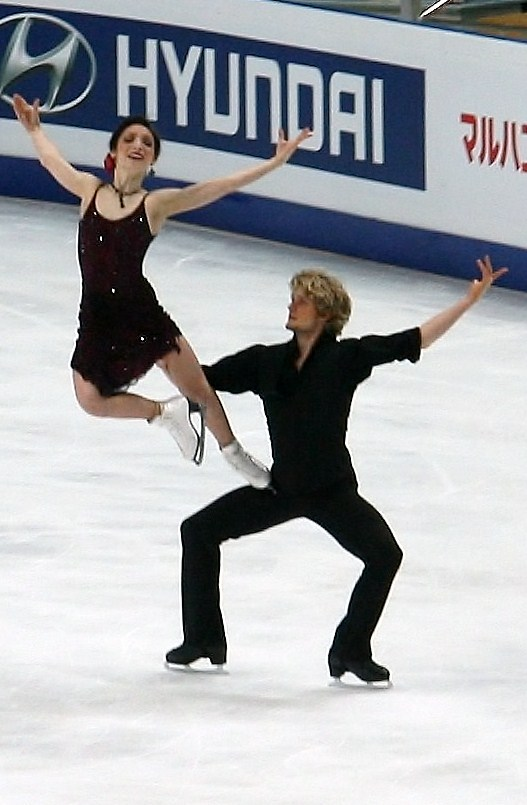
The U.S. figure skating team and bronze medalists from the 2014 Winter Olympics (from left to right):
Jeremy Abbott; Jason Brown; Ashley Wagner; Gracie Gold; Marissa Castelli and Simon Shnapir; and Meryl Davis and Charlie White

== Records ==
The following new record high score was set during this competition. Additionally, the Russian gold medal in the team event allowed Evgeni Plushenko to tie the record held by Gillis Grafström of Sweden for winning the most Olympic medals in figure skating (with four each).

Record high scores
Date	Skater(s)	Segment	Score	Ref.
9 February	(United States); Meryl Davis; Charlie White	Free dance	114.34	

== Works cited ==
- "International Skating Union – Special Regulations & Technical Rules – Single & Pair Skating and Ice Dance 2012" (PDF). International Skating Union. June 2012. Archived from the original (PDF) on 22 February 2014.
