= Melissa Bulanhagui =

American figure skater (born 1990)

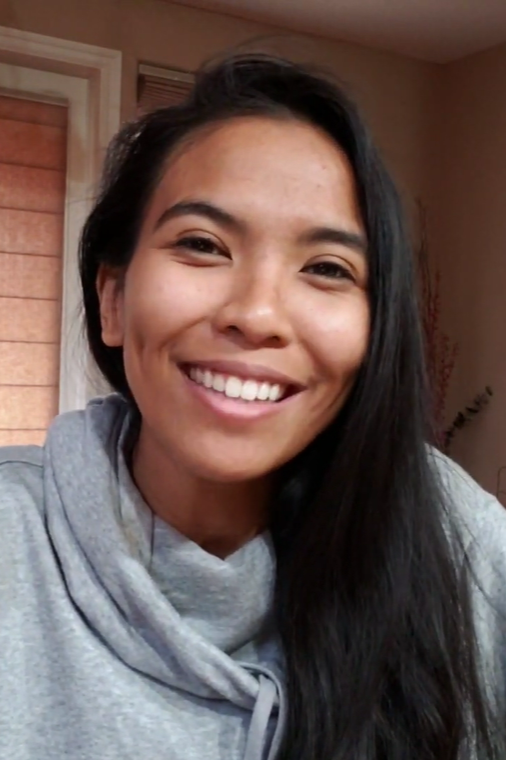
- Melissa Bulanhagui in 2019

Personal information
- Full name: Melissa Carmen Bulanhagui
- Born: August 16, 1990 (age 36) Philadelphia, Pennsylvania, U.S.
- Height: 5 ft 0 in (1.52 m)

Figure skating career
- Country: Philippines (2011–2015); United States (until 2011)
- Coach: Karen Ludington; Ron Ludington; Kat Arbour
- Skating club: University of Delaware FSC
- Retired: 2015

Melissa Carmen Bulanhagui (born August 16, 1990) is an American former figure skater. She represented the United States internationally from 2005 through 2010. She became the 2006 U.S. junior national bronze medalist and won two ISU Junior Grand Prix medals (gold at 2008 JGP Italy, silver at 2006 JGP Romania). After moving up to the senior ranks, she won bronze at the 2010 Nebelhorn Trophy. In 2011, she decided to compete for the Philippines. She would win bronze at the 2013 Asian Open Trophy and two Philippine national titles (2012, 2013). She also competed at two Four Continents Championships.

== Career ==
=== Figure skating ===
Bulanhagui won the junior bronze medal at the 2006 U.S. Championships. She made her ISU Junior Grand Prix debut the following season, winning a silver medal and placing 4th in her other event. She qualified for the Final where she finished 4th.

In 2007, Bulanhagui sprained her right ankle twice and tore a ligament while practicing triple lutzes. During the 2008–09 season, she won a gold medal at the Junior Grand Prix event in Italy and placed 9th in her other event. In September 2010, she won her first senior international medal – bronze at the Nebelhorn Trophy in Germany.

In September 2011, Bulanhagui announced that she would compete at the national championships of the Philippines in November 2011 and would become eligible for international events in the 2012–13 season. She placed 17th at the 2013 Four Continents Championships, which took place in February in Osaka, Japan. In August 2013, she won bronze at the Asian Open Figure Skating Trophy. She finished 15th at the 2015 Four Continents Championships in Seoul, South Korea.

=== Pornography ===
Since 2019, Bulanhagui works as a pornographic actress under the stage name Jada Kai.

== Personal life ==
Bulanhagui's parents are both from the Philippines. She speaks and understands some Tagalog although she is not fluent. She received her Philippine passport in October 2011.

== Programs ==
Season	Short program	Free skating
2013–2015	House of Flying Daggers by Shigeru Umebayashi	Angry and Dead Again by Rodrigo y Gabriela
2012–2013	Egyptian Disco	Symphony No. 2 by Sergei Rachmaninoff
2010–2011	Tango	Piano Concerto No. 2 by Sergei Rachmaninoff
2009–2010	Memoirs of a Geisha by John Williams	Les Misérables by Claude-Michel Schönberg
2008–2009	Memoirs of a Geisha by John Williams	Slow Dancing by Bill Conti
2007–2008	Pink Panther by Henry Mancini	Shall We Dance; Dirty Dancing: Havana Nights
2006–2007	House of Flying Daggers by Shigeru Umebayashi	Shall We Dance; Dirty Dancing: Havana Nights

== Competitive highlights ==
=== For the Philippines ===
International
Event	11–12	12–13	13–14	14–15
Four Continents		17th		15th
Asian Trophy			3rd	
U.S. Classic		7th		
National
Philippine Champ.	1st	1st		

=== For the United States ===
International
Event	05–06	06–07	07–08	08–09	09–10	10–11
Nebelhorn Trophy						3rd
International: Junior
JGP Final		4th				
JGP Belarus				9th		
JGP Bulgaria			5th			
JGP Czech Rep.		4th				
JGP Italy				1st		
JGP Romania		2nd				
Gardena Trophy	1st					
NACS	2nd					
National
U.S. Champ.	3rd J	12th	8th		12th	10th
