= Park Yeon-jun =

South Korean figure skater (born 1997)

Personal information
- Native name: 박연준
- Born: January 8, 1997 (age 29) Seoul, South Korea
- Home town: Seoul
- Height: 1.62 m (5 ft 4 in)

Figure skating career
- Country: South Korea
- Coach: Sung Man Cho

- Park Yeon-jun
- Hangul: 박연준
- RR: Bak Yeonjun
- MR: Pak Yŏnjun

Park Yeon-jun (born January 8, 1997) is a South Korean figure skater. She is the 2011 Asian Figure Skating Trophy champion and competed at the 2013 Four Continents Championships, placing 16th.

== Programs ==
Season	Short program	Free skating
2013–2015	Jumpin' Jack by Big Bad Voodoo Daddy	Bolero For Violin And Orchestra by Vanessa-Mae
2012–2013	Swan Lake by Pyotr Ilyich Tchaikovsky	Tango de Roxanne (from Moulin Rouge!)
2011–2012	Swan Lake by Pyotr Ilyich Tchaikovsky	Tango de Roxanne (from Moulin Rouge!)
2010–2011	Swan Lake by Pyotr Ilyich Tchaikovsky	Nocturne No. 20 in C-sharp minor by Frédéric Chopin

== Competitive highlights ==
International
Event	10–11	11–12	12–13	13–14
Four Continents Champ.			16th	
Asian Trophy		1st		
National
South Korean Champ.	8th J	WD	16th	24th
J = Junior level; WD = Withdrew
