= Dylan Moscovitch =

Canadian pair skater (born 1984)

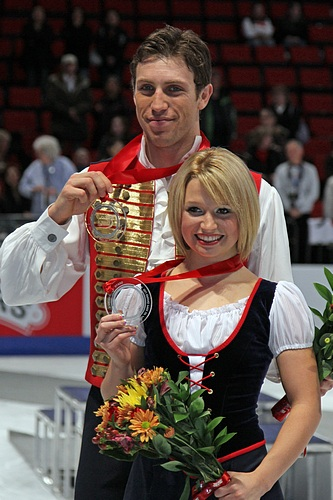
- Moore-Towers and Moscovitch in 2010

Personal information
- Full name: Dylan David Moscovitch
- Born: September 23, 1984 (age 42) Toronto, Ontario
- Height: 1.78 m (5 ft 10 in)

Figure skating career
- Country: Canada
- Coach: Lee Barkell, Bryce Davison, Tracy Wilson
- Skating club: Toronto Cricket, Skating and Curling Club
- Began skating: 1987
- Retired: April 10, 2018

Medal record
Olympic Games
Silver medal – second place	2014 Sochi	Team
Four Continents Championships
Silver medal – second place	2013 Osaka	Pairs
Bronze medal – third place	2017 Gangneung	Pairs
Canadian Championships
Gold medal – first place	2011 Victoria	Pairs
Silver medal – second place	2013 Mississauga	Pairs
Silver medal – second place	2014 Ottawa	Pairs
Silver medal – second place	2015 Kingston	Pairs
Silver medal – second place	2017 Ottawa	Pairs
Bronze medal – third place	2016 Halifax	Pairs

Dylan David Moscovitch (born 23 September 1984) is a retired Canadian pair skater. He competed with Liubov Ilyushechkina from 2014 to 2018. They were the 2017 Four Continents bronze medalists, two-time bronze medalists on the Grand Prix series, and three-time Canadian national medalists (silver in 2015 and 2017, bronze in 2016).

With former partner Kirsten Moore-Towers, he was the 2013 Four Continents silver medalist, 2014 Olympic team event silver medalist, and 2011 Canadian national champion.

== Personal life ==
Dylan David Moscovitch was born 23 September 1984 in Toronto, Ontario. He is Jewish. His mother is a midwife from South Africa, his father is an engineer designer from Montreal, and one of his grandfathers is from Romania. He has two younger sisters, Natasha and Kyra, and a younger brother, Mischa. He is a master of and teaches Krav Maga. He is an alumnus of Birthright Israel.

In 2021, Moscovitch was engaged to Canadian tennis player Sharon Fichman. They have now broken up and gone their separate ways.

In 2025, Moscovitch made a cameo appearance in the Canadian sports romance television series Heated Rivalry as a figure skater friend of one of the main characters who competes at the 2014 Winter Olympics.

== Early years ==
Moscovitch first stepped onto the ice at the age of 13 months, at an outdoor rink, and then took lessons at the West Toronto Skating Club. Early in his career, he was coached by Paul Wirtz at the Toronto Cricket, Skating and Curling Club.

Moscovitch began pair skating in June 2003, partnering his nine-year-old sister, Kyra. He also continued to compete in singles. Paul Wirtz and assistant coaches Kris Wirtz and Kristy Sargeant-Wirtz worked with the Moscovitches until January 2006, when the pair joined Lee Barkell in Barrie, Ontario. Kyra Moscovitch retired from competition after being diagnosed with scoliosis in October 2008.

== Partnership with Moore-Towers ==
=== 2009–10 season ===
In February 2009, Moscovitch teamed with Kirsten Moore-Towers, who had trained at the same rink for several years. Kris Wirtz and Kristy Sargeant-Wirtz coached the pair at the Kitchener-Waterloo Skating Club in Waterloo, Ontario.

Moore-Towers/Moscovitch debuted on the Grand Prix series at the 2009 Skate Canada International, placing sixth. They came fifth at the 2010 Canadian Championships, and thus did not qualify for the Canadian teams for the 2010 Winter Olympics and 2010 World Championships. They were instead sent to the 2010 Four Continents Championships in Jeonju, South Korea, where they placed ninth.

=== 2010–11 season: National champions ===
The pair initially received one Grand Prix assignment, the 2010 Skate America, but received a second, the 2010 Skate Canada International, after Jessica Dube / Bryce Davison withdrew. They won silver at both events and qualified for the Grand Prix Final, where they finished sixth.

At the 2011 Canadian Championships, Moore-Towers/Moscovitch placed first in both programs to win the Canadian national title, 16.29 points ahead of silver medalists Meagan Duhamel / Eric Radford. At the 2011 Four Continents Championships they placed fifth overall, after coming fifth in the short program and winning a small bronze medal for coming third in the free skate. In their debut at the 2011 World Championships, they placed eighth.

=== 2011–12 season ===
Assigned to two Grand Prix events, Moore-Towers/Moscovitch won bronze at both the 2011 Skate America and the 2011 Cup of China. At the 2012 Canadian Championships they placed third in the short program and fourth in the free skate, finishing off the podium in fourth despite being the defending champions. Moore-Towers fell on their three-jump combination, and both fell while exiting a lift, resulting in three fall deductions accrued during the free skate. She commented afterward: "I still love figure skating."

=== 2012–13 season: Silver at Four Continents ===
Moore-Towers/Moscovitch began the season at the 2012 U.S. Classic, where they won the gold medal. They came fourth at their first Grand Prix assignment, the 2012 Cup of China, but went on to win silver at the 2012 NHK Trophy. These results qualified them for the Grand Prix Final for the second time, where they finished fifth.

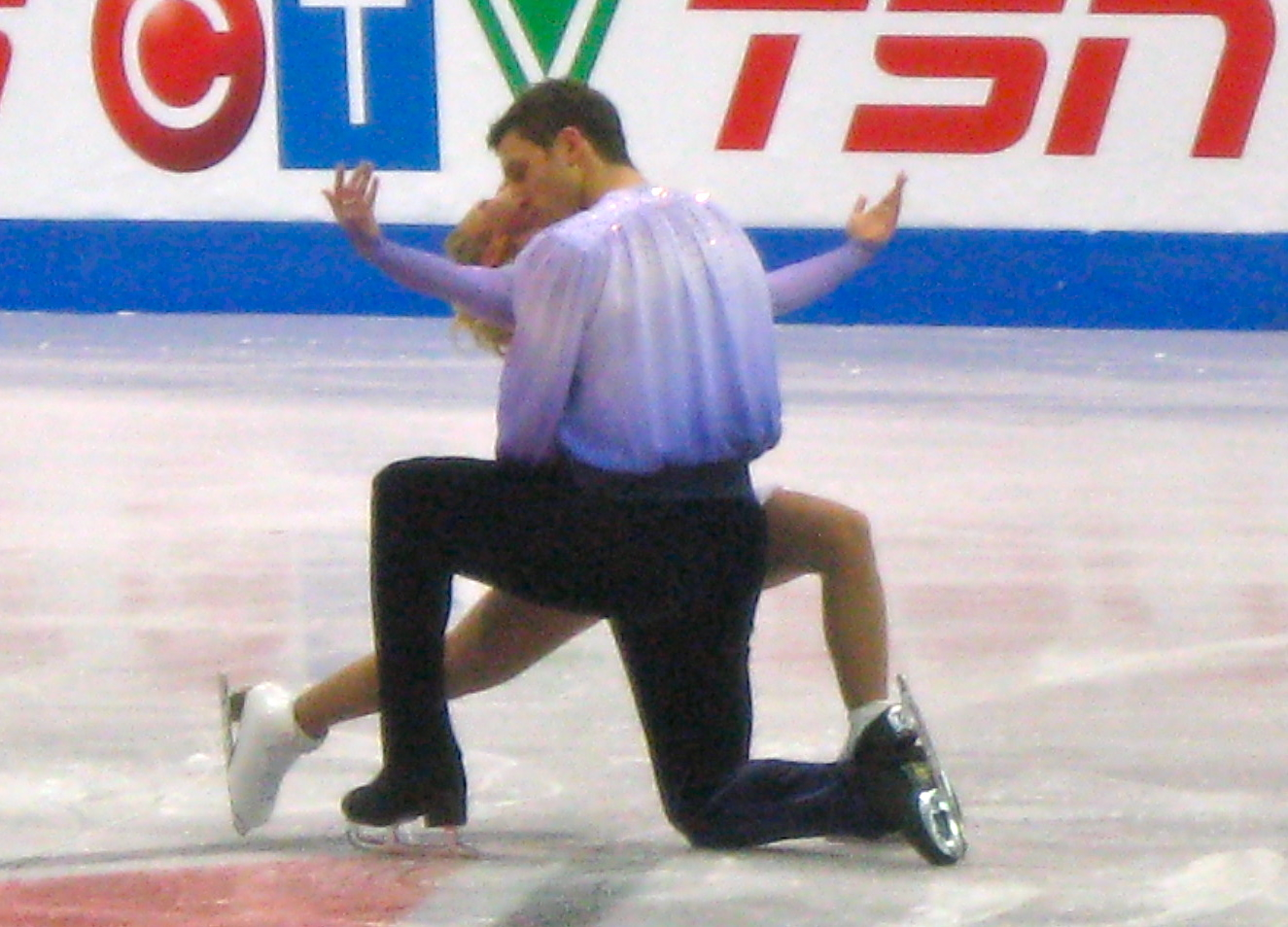
Moore-Towers and Moscovitch at the 2013 Canadian Championships

At the 2013 Canadian Championships, they placed second in both programs to win the silver medal, behind Duhamel/Radford. At the 2013 Four Continents Championships in Osaka, Japan, they placed second in the first program and first in the free skate, again winning the silver medal behind Duhamel/Radford. Moore-Towers' fall on a throw triple loop prevented them from winning the title outright, which she called "a bit unfortunate." This was the team's first (and only, as it would turn out) medal at a major international competition.

Moore-Towers/Moscovitch ended the season at the 2013 World Championships in London, Ontario, where they placed fourth after coming fifth in both segments.

=== 2013–14 season: Sochi Olympics ===
Moore-Towers/Moscovitch won their third gold at 2013 U.S. Classic, before turning to the Grand Prix series. They won a silver medal at the 2013 Skate America and bronze at the 2013 Rostelecom Cup, which qualified them for their third Grand Prix Final, where they again came sixth.

They won another silver medal at the 2014 Canadian Championships, and were named to the Canadian team for the 2014 Winter Olympics. Moore-Towers/Moscovitch were part of the Canadian team for the team event in Sochi, performing the pairs free skate portion, where they came second. Canada won the silver medal overall. In the pairs event, they came sixth in the short program and fifth in the free skate, to finish fifth overall.

In their final event together, the 2014 World Championships in Saitama, Japan, they were sixth after the short program, but came third in the free skate, winning a bronze small medal and finishing in fourth place overall for the second straight year. Moore-Towers and Moscovitch announced the end of their partnership on April 30, 2014, stating that they had different goals.

== Partnership with Iliushechkina ==
Moscovitch contacted Russian skater Liubov Ilyushechkina and arranged a tryout, which took place in Detroit in mid-May 2014. On June 3, 2014, a news report stated that they had decided to form a partnership coached by Lee Barkell and Bryce Davison at the Toronto Cricket, Skating and Curling Club. The pair continued training in Detroit until Ilyushechkina received a Canadian visa, in late June. Moscovitch stated, "We have different lifts and different throw and twist techniques. [...] We are still ironing everything out to see what works best for both of us as a team."

=== 2014–15 season ===
Ilyushechkina/Moscovitch started their career together by winning an ISU Challenger Series (CS) event, the 2014 Warsaw Cup. After winning the 2014 Skate Canada Challenge, they qualified for the 2015 Canadian Championships where they were awarded the silver medal behind defending champions Meagan Duhamel / Eric Radford. They were named in Canada's team to the 2015 Four Continents, where they finished seventh, and the 2015 World Championships, where they came in thirteenth.

=== 2015–16 season ===
Ilyushechkina/Moscovitch's first assignment of the 2015–16 season was the 2015 Ondrej Nepela Trophy, a CS event, where they finished fourth. They received two Grand Prix assignments, the 2015 Cup of China and 2015 NHK Trophy, where they respectively placed seventh and fifth. They won the bronze medal at the 2016 Canadian Championships.

In February, Ilyushechkina/Moscovitch placed fifth at the 2016 Four Continents Championships in Taipei, having ranked fifth in both segments. In April, they finished seventh at the 2016 World Championships in Boston after placing eighth in the short program and sixth in the free skate.

=== 2016–17 season: Bronze at Four Continents ===
Starting their season on the Challenger Series, Ilyushechkina/Moscovitch won silver at the 2016 CS Nebelhorn Trophy. In October 2016, they stepped onto their first Grand Prix podium, receiving bronze at the 2016 Skate Canada International. The following month, they won bronze at another Grand Prix event, the 2016 Cup of China.

In January 2017, the pair obtained silver at the Canadian Championships. In February, they won the bronze medal at the 2017 Four Continents Championships in Gangneung, South Korea. They reached a career-best sixth place at the 2017 World Championships in Helsinki, Finland. Their placement combined with the seven-place finish of Duhamel/Radford guaranteed Canada three spots at the 2018 Winter Olympics.

=== 2017–18 season ===
Ilyushechkina became a Canadian citizen in September 2017, which was necessary to qualify to attend to the Olympics. The pair began the season at the 2017 CS Finlandia Trophy, where they finished in fourth place. They finished sixth at the 2017 Skate Canada International and fourth at the 2017 Internationaux de France.

Three weeks before the 2018 Canadian Championships, the outcome of which would decide the composition of the Canadian Olympic team, Moscovitch suffered an accident where a door fell on him, leading to facial and hand lacerations, an injured hand, and a concussion, with the recovery diminishing his preparation time. As a result, Ilyushechkina/Moscovitch made errors in the free program, with Moscovitch stepping out of their side-by-side triple toe loop jump, and placed fourth in the competition. As a result, they were instead sent to the 2018 Four Continents Championships, where they also finished fourth. This would prove to be their last event together, as Moscovitch announced his retirement afterward.

== Programs ==
=== With Ilyushechkina ===
Season	Short program	Free skating	Exhibition
2017–2018	Tango Jalousie by Jacob Gade choreo. by David Wilson and Marie-France Dubreuil; In the Air Tonight by Phil Collins	At This Moment performed by Billy Vera & The Beaters	Black Velvet by Alannah Myles
2016–2017	Tango Jalousie by Jacob Gade choreo. by David Wilson and Marie-France Dubreuil	When You Say You Love Me by Darren Hayes performed by Josh Groban choreo. by David Wilson and Sandra Bezic	Black Velvet by Alannah Myles; When You Say You Love Me by Darren Hayes performed by Josh Groban choreo. by David Wilson and Sandra Bezic; Since I've Been Loving You by Led Zeppelin choreo. by David Wilson
2015–2016	Since I've Been Loving You by Led Zeppelin choreo. by David Wilson	Symphony No. 2 in E minor, Op. 27 by Sergei Rachmaninoff choreo. by David Wilson	Feeling Good performed by Michael Bublé choreo. by David Wilson
2014–2015	Feeling Good performed by Michael Bublé choreo. by David Wilson	From Russia with Love by John Barry choreo. by David Wilson	I Put a Spell on You

=== With Moore-Towers ===
Season	Short program	Free skating	Exhibition
2013–2014	A Motley Crew (from Micmacs) by Raphael Beau, Max Steiner	Fellini medley by Nino Rota	Everybody Hurts by R.E.M.; Skater's Waltz by Émile Waldteufel
2012–2013	Micmacs by Raphael Beau, Max Steiner	Medley by Queen	Inside Out by Imelda May
2011–2012	Borsalino by Claude Bolling	Henry V by Patrick Doyle	
2010–2011	Zorba's Dance by Mikis Theodorakis	Les Misérables by Claude-Michel Schönberg	Bring It On
2009–2010	Brazil by Michael Kamen: The Office; Jill Brazil/Power Station; Brazil	Leyenda performed by Vanessa-Mae; Romanza Concertino in A minor; Malaguena performed by Brian Setzer	Something by Jim Sturgess

=== With Kyra Moscovitch ===
Season	Short program	Free skating	Exhibition
2005–2006	Scott & Fran's Paso Doble (from Strictly Ballroom) by David Hirschfelder & The Bogo Pogo Orchestra	Samson and Delilah by Camille Saint-Saëns	Cotton-Eyed Joe

=== Single skating ===
Season	Short program	Free skating	Exhibition
2004–2005	Battle Without Honor or Humanity (from Kill Bill Vol. 1) by Tomoyasu Hotei	Son of Neck Bone by the Beastie Boys; Armageddon	

== Results ==
GP: Grand Prix; CS: Challenger Series; JGP: Junior Grand Prix

=== With Ilyushechkina ===
International
Event	2014–15	2015–16	2016–17	2017–18
Worlds	13th	7th	6th	
Four Continents	6th	5th	3rd	4th
GP Bompard				4th
GP Cup of China		7th	3rd	
GP NHK Trophy		5th		
GP Skate Canada			3rd	6th
CS Finlandia Trophy				4th
CS Nebelhorn Trophy			2nd	
CS Nepela Trophy		4th		
CS Warsaw Cup	1st			
National
Canadian Champ.	2nd	3rd	2nd	4th
SC Challenge	1st			
TBD = Assigned

=== With Moore-Towers ===
International
Event	09–10	10–11	11–12	12–13	13–14
Olympics					5th
Worlds		8th		4th	4th
Four Continents	9th	5th		2nd	
GP Final		6th		5th	6th
GP Cup of China			3rd	4th	
GP NHK Trophy				2nd	
GP Rostelecom Cup					3rd
GP Skate America		2nd	3rd		2nd
GP Skate Canada	6th	2nd			
U.S. Classic				1st	1st
National
Canadian Champ.	5th	1st	4th	2nd	2nd
Team events
Olympics					2nd T 2nd P
WD = Withdrew

=== With Moscovitch ===
International
Event	05–06	06–07	07–08	08–09
Nebelhorn Trophy				8th
National
Canadian Champ.	1st J	7th	4th	
J = Junior level

=== Men's singles ===
National
Event	02-03	03-04	04-05
Canadian Champ.	6th J	2nd J	14th
J = Junior level

== See also ==
- List of select Jewish figure skaters
- List of Jewish Olympic medalists
