= 2013 Four Continents Figure Skating Championships =

2013 Four Continents Championships
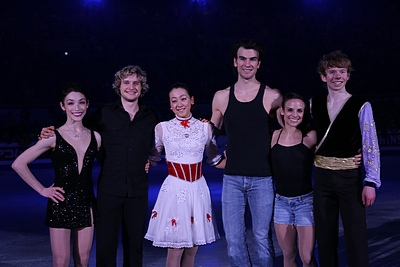
- Type: ISU Championship
- Date: February 6 – 11
- Season: 2012–13
- Location: Osaka, Japan
- Venue: Osaka Municipal Central Gymnasium

Champions
- Men's singles: (Canada) Kevin Reynolds
- Ladies' singles: (Japan) Mao Asada
- Pairs: (Canada) Meagan Duhamel / Eric Radford
- Ice dance: (United States) Meryl Davis / Charlie White
- Previous: 2012 Four Continents Championships
- Next: 2014 Four Continents Championships

The 2013 Four Continents Figure Skating Championships was a senior international figure skating competition in the 2012–13 season. It was held at the Osaka Municipal Central Gymnasium in Osaka, Japan on February 6–11. Medals were awarded in the disciplines of men's singles, ladies' singles, pair skating, and ice dancing.

== Qualification ==
The competition was open to skaters from a non-European member nation of the International Skating Union who reached the age of 15 before July 1, 2012. The corresponding competition for European skaters was the 2013 European Figure Skating Championships. Unlike the European event, national associations at Four Continents are all allowed up to three entries in each discipline, regardless of how their skaters placed at the previous year's event. Member nations select their entries based on their own national criteria. Entries were required to achieve a minimum technical elements score (TES) at an international event prior to the Four Continents Championships. The minimum TES for each discipline and segment were:

Minimum technical scores (TES)
Discipline	Short	Free
Men	25.00	45.00
Ladies	20.00	36.00
Pairs	20.00	36.00
Ice dancing	18.00	28.00
Must be achieved at an ISU-recognized international event in the ongoing or preceding season. SP and FS scores may be attained at different events.

== Entries ==
A total of 85 skaters from 13 nations participated at the event, including 23 in men's singles, 20 in ladies' singles, 8 pairs teams, and 13 ice dancing teams.

Country	Men	Ladies	Pairs	Ice dancing
Australia	Brendan Kerry; David Kranjec	Brooklee Han; Chantelle Kerry		Danielle O'Brien / Gregory Merriman
Canada	Elladj Balde; Kevin Reynolds; Andrei Rogozine	Amélie Lacoste; Kaetlyn Osmond; Julianne Séguin	Meagan Duhamel / Eric Radford; Paige Lawrence / Rudi Swiegers; Kirsten Moore-Towers / Dylan Moscovitch	Piper Gilles / Paul Poirier; Nicole Orford / Thomas Williams; Tessa Virtue / Scott Moir
China	Song Nan; Wang Yi; Yan Han	Li Zijun; Zhang Kexin	Peng Cheng / Zhang Hao; Wang Wenting / Zhang Yan	Yu Xiaoyang / Wang Chen
Chinese Taipei	Jordan Ju	Crystal Kiang; Melinda Wang		
India		Ami Parekh		
Japan	Yuzuru Hanyu; Takahito Mura; Daisuke Takahashi	Mao Asada; Kanako Murakami; Akiko Suzuki		Emi Hirai / Marien de la Asuncion; Bryna Oi / Taiyo Mizutani; Cathy Reed / Chris Reed
Kazakhstan	Abzal Rakimgaliev; Denis Ten			
Mexico		Reyna Hamui		Pilar Maekawa Moreno / Leonardo Maekawa Moreno
Philippines	Christopher Caluza; Michael Christian Martinez	Melissa Bulanhagui		
South Africa		Lejeanne Marais		
South Korea	Kim Jin-seo; Kim Min-seok; Lee June-hyoung	Park Yeon-jun		
United States	Max Aaron; Richard Dornbush; Ross Miner	Christina Gao; Gracie Gold; Agnes Zawadzki	Marissa Castelli / Simon Shnapir; Felicia Zhang / Nathan Bartholomay	Madison Chock / Evan Bates; Meryl Davis / Charlie White; Maia Shibutani / Alex Shibutani
Uzbekistan	Misha Ge			Anna Nagornyuk / Viktor Kovalenko
Total entries	23	20	8	13

=== Withdrawals ===
Two-time World champions and Olympic silver medalists Pang Qing / Tong Jian and ice dancers Huang Xintong / Zheng Xun withdrew from the pairs and ice dancing events respectively. China did not replace either team. On January 31, South Korea's Kim Hae-jin withdrew from the ladies' event and was not replaced. On February 1, Brazil's Isadora Williams withdrew from the ladies' event and Brazil did not replace her, leaving the country without any entries at the competition. On February 4, American Adam Rippon withdrew from the men's event and the U.S. called up Richard Dornbush to take his place. Ronald Lam from Hong Kong also withdrew from the men's event and was not replaced, leaving Hong Kong without an entry. Alexa Scimeca / Chris Knierim of the United States withdrew from the pairs' event a day before the start of the competition and were not replaced.

== Schedule ==
Official training sessions occurred at the Osaka Pool and the main venue from February 6 throughout the competition period.

All times are Japan Standard Time (UTC+9).

Date	Start	Discipline	Event
Friday, 8 February	13:20	Ice dance	Short dance
Friday, 8 February	16:00	Pairs	Short program
Friday, 8 February	18:00		Opening ceremony
Friday, 8 February	18:30	Men	Short program
Saturday, 9 February	13:40	Ladies	Short program
Saturday, 9 February	17:55	Men	Free skate
Sunday, 10 February	12:50	Pairs	Free skate
Sunday, 10 February	15:30	Ladies	Free skate
Sunday, 10 February	20:15	Ice dance	Free dance
Monday, 11 February	15:00		Exhibition gala

== Overview ==
Olympic and two time world ice dancing champions Tessa Virtue / Scott Moir were the only defending Four Continents champions entered in the 2013 event. 2012 men's champion Patrick Chan elected not to compete in order to prepare for the 2013 World Figure Skating Championships in London, Ontario, Canada as well as allowing his fellow Canadian skaters to compete. 2012 ladies' champion Ashley Wagner did not defend her title for the same reason. China's Sui Wenjing / Han Cong did not defend their pairs title due to injury.

== Competition recap ==
=== Short programs / Short dance ===
==== Ice dancing ====
The competition began with the short dance with Canada's Tessa Virtue / Scott Moir winning the segment with a score of 75.12 with a 0.44 point advantage over training partners from the United States Meryl Davis / Charlie White. Despite scoring higher in the presentation score and most of the elements, a small stutter in their non-touching step sequence from White allowed the Canadians, who earned a level four for the non-touching step sequence to edge ahead.

In an interview following the short dance, Moir commented that they were pleased with their performance to Anthony Hopkin's "The Waltz goes on".

"The biggest thing for us today was – it felt like the seasons best skate. So no matter what the score was, that's always the best feeling. Ever since we've been young that's really the feeling we chase. If we feel we are together, it feels like a strong performance, if the coaches are happy with it - that's the big thing", Moir remarked.

Davis / White too said that they were pleased but a little disappointed with their Giselle short dance.

"I think it was a really good performance today. It was a step up in a lot of aspects. Technically it wasn't what we were aiming for. We had a couple of little mistakes here and there which certainly you can't get away at this point. We're looking to execute everything perfectly at this point of the season, but I think we've made some improvement in a lot of other areas. Despite the little mistakes we are headed into the right direction and we're feeling good", Davis said.

American national silver medalists Madison Chock / Evan Bates scored 65.44, leaving them in third place, 2.18 points ahead of American bronze medalists, Maia Shibutani / Alex Shibutani. Japan's Cathy Reed / Chris Reed were the highest ranked home team, finishing in sixth place with 53.97, 0.27 points ahead of Canada's Nicole Orford / Thomas Williams.

==== Pairs ====
The short dance was followed by the pairs short program. Canadian champions Meagan Duhamel / Eric Radford successfully executed a side-by-side triple lutz and throw triple lutz in their La Bohème routine to take first place with 70.44, 4.11 points ahead of fellow skaters and Canadian silver medalists Kirsten Moore-Towers / Dylan Moscovitch.

"To break that 70 points barrier, not too many teams have done that, it feels incredible", Radford shared. "We kind of discovered especially after last Nationals the more pressure that's on, the better we seem to skate. Coming in here we knew that we have a great chance to finally have a gold medal after all these silver medals. We came in with a fighting attitude as opposed to trying to ride the wave from Nationals", he added.

Moore-Towers was also very pleased with their program but said the pair wished to clean up some small errors before the 2013 World Championships in London, Ontario.

American champions Marissa Castelli / Simon Shnapir had an error ridden program faulting on their triple twist, side by side spins and throw triple salchow to finish in third with 53.06, trailing second by 13.27 points. There were no Japanese teams in this event. China's highest ranking team was Peng Cheng / Zhang Hao in fifth place with 52.46 points, after doubling a side-by-side triple toe and making an error on the throw triple loop.

==== Men ====
The men's short program followed the pairs' short. Hometown favourite Yuzuru Hanyu won the short program, successfully executing a quadruple toe loop and a triple axel but singling his triple lutz in combination to earn 87.65 for his Parisian Walkways routine, 2.57 points in front of China's Yan Han who skated a technically flawless program.

In the interview after the short program, Hanyu expressed his disappointment.

"I do not feel good about my performance. I think I missed the Lutz because my timing was a bit fast. I did not feel the pressure from being the national champion. I did not focus on winning or losing to Daisuke (Takahashi) or Takahito (Mura), and I was focusing on my own performance."

China's Yan was greatly surprised by what he accomplished in the short program, considering that he did not assume that he would be a medal contender.

"I am very pleased with what I did. I did all my elements. I don't have a special goal for this event, this being my first (international) senior competition. I don't expect a medal or anything, I am here to learn. Today's result won't put pressure on me. I just want to show what I can do in practice in the free skating and want to do all my elements", Yan explained.

Despite American skater Richard Dornbush placing his hand down on the triple axel, his quadruple toe loop and triple lutz-triple toe loop combination earned him 83.01 points and a third-place finish for his "With or without you" program. Japan's Daisuke Takahashi had an error ridden program to be left in fourth place with 82.62. China's Song Nan finished fifth with 81.18. Kevin Reynolds was the highest ranked Canadian in the short program, under rotating his quadruple salchow and quadruple toe loop to lie in sixth with 78.34 points.

==== Ladies ====
The ladies' short program saw Japan's Mao Asada perfectly execute her triple axel, which has been absent since the previous Olympic season. The technical and artistic strength she displayed in her routine to the "I've got rhythm" variations by Gershwin propelled her into the lead with 74.49, 8.84 points clear of Akiko Suzuki, who scored 65.65.

"This is the first time I landed my triple Axel in my short program this season. I was in good condition since I came here. The moment I jumped I was 99 percent sure I was going to land it (triple Axel). My condition has been going up since Nationals. It is exactly one year till the Sochi Olympic Games, and I would like to skate my best there. I would like to bring this confidence into my free skating tomorrow", Asada said.

In the press conference, Suzuki expressed a sigh of relief that her "Kill Bill" routine was clean.

"I was able to feel like "I finally made it". I have been struggling with jumps this season, and I had tough time making my best towards the competitions. I didn't have 100% confidence in the triple-triple but my coach and I went through practices to make me strong mentally", the Grand Prix Final bronze medalist commented. "(In the Free Skating) I would like to skate like a "flying bird" and I hope my skate will make the audience smile", she added.

The Japanese ladies clean swept the short program with Kanako Murakami earning 64.04 and a third-place finish. Christina Gao was the highest of the American skaters, landing in fourth place with 62.34. China's Zhang Kexin was the highest ranked skater from her nation, earning 57.56 and a sixth-place finish.

=== Free skatings ===
==== Men ====
The first free skating of the competition was the men's free skating. The highly competitive segment of the competition saw as many as twelve of the skaters attempting or executing quadruple jumps. Taking advantage of his technical strength, Canadian skater Kevin Reynolds laid out three quadruple jumps and numerous triples jumps to cause a massive upset. His program, music from "Concerto No. 4 in E Minor for piano and orchestra" by Mathieu earned him an enormous 172.21 points to take the championship overall with 250.55. In his interview, Reynolds said that he was shocked that he actually won, even when he knew his skate was medal worthy.

"This was completely beyond anything that I would've expected. I knew I was in the range of medals if I do everything in my free skating. I had a couple of under-rotated quad jumps in my short program. I came back to the practice this morning and worked on them. Recently, I was able to do two strong performances at our national championships, so that gave me a lot of confidence, but being able to win this competition surpassed everything I could have expected."

Reynolds hopes he will skate a top six finish at the 2013 World Figure Skating Championships in London, Ontario.

Japan's Yuzuru Hanyu was unable to hold onto the lead, doubling a planned quadruple salchow, receiving an incorrect edge call on a triple flip and singling a triple lutz in his "Notre Dame de Paris" program to place third in the free skating with 158.73 points and finish second overall with 246.38.

At the press conference, Hanyu talked about his disappointment for not winning as expected and his optimism to peak at the World Championships.

He says, "I am full of disappointment, but after I was done, I felt refreshed and relieved. Regarding my performance, there is a lot of what I need to improve. But I have not lost my confidence and there are a lot of things I can do better."

Despite a fall and under rotation call on his quadruple toe loop, China's Yan Han was able to hold onto the podium with bronze medal finish, earning 150.14 points with a total of 235.22 points. Despite his errors, the sixteen-year-old said he was greatly satisfied of how he performed, especially when he did not expect to medal at all.

Despite finishing second in the free skating, America's Max Aaron was unable to make the podium with a fourth-place finish and a total of 234.65. Fellow skater Richard Dornbush slipped from third to fifth finishing 0.61 points behind Aaron. Japan's Daisuke Takahashi had another disappointing skate finishing overall in seventh place with 222.77 points. Kazakhstan's Denis Ten slipped from seventh to twelfth with a total of 197.26 after finishing seventeenth in the free skating.

==== Pairs ====
The final day of competition began with the pair's free skating. Canada's Meagan Duhamel / Eric Radford earned a seasons' best score of 128.74 to take their first international title with 199.18, however, errors on both side by side elements meant that fellow skaters Kirsten Moore-Towers / Dylan Moscovitch finished higher in the free skating. Despite a fall on the throw triple loop, the couple earned 130.45 with a total score of 196.78.

Following the event, Duhamel told reporters that they were disappointed with their performance, describing that their program to "Angel" was a struggle.

"We know we are capable of skating much better. We want to show an improved free skating at the world championships. We felt confident going in but once the music started it just became a struggle."

Moore-Towers / Moscovitch were pleased about their free skating to a Queen medley and said that they had the confidence to achieve a podium finish at the 2013 World figure skating championships.

"We feel great about our performance. It is a bit unfortunate that we lost the championship on an element we do easily all the time, but we don't intend on that happening next time", Moore-Towers said. "(At the ISU World Championships next month) we want to skate two clean programs. We want to better ourselves from here and from Nationals and we're really hoping that lands us on the podium. There are a lot of teams vying for the spot and we are trying to get it. If we keep working hard and skate the way we know we can it's attainable", she added.

American national champions Marissa Castelli / Simon Shnapir took the bronze medal. Despite making errors on both side by side elements and the side by side spins, they earned 117.04 with a safe total of 170.10, 2.80 points ahead of fellow skaters Felicia Zhang / Nathan Bartholomay. Despite China's Peng Cheng / Zhang Hao executing a quadruple twist, errors in their side by side elements meant that they only earned 112.36 to finish fifth with 164.82. Canada's Paige Lawrence / Rudi Swiegers bounced back from a poor short program to finish fifth in the free skating with 113.54 with a total score of 162.30 and a sixth-place finish. China's Wang Wenting / Zhang Yan rounded out the field finishing with 145.56.

Duhamel / Radford became the first Canadians to claim the pairs title since Jamie Sale and David Pelletier in 2002.

==== Ladies ====
Following that event was the ladies' free skating with Japan continuing to display their dominance in ladies' singles by clean sweeping the podium for the second time in the history of the Four Continents Championships.

Despite under rotating a triple axel and the ends of two combinations and receiving an incorrect edge call on a triple lutz, Mao Asada earned 130.96 for her "Swan Lake" performance with a winning total of 205.45.

"For the first time since the Olympic Games I went over 200 points, so I feel that I am coming back to my performance level. Today's performance was about in-line with my practice, so I need to practice more to exceed today's level", the two-time World Champion said. "Throughout this Four Continent Championship, I was able to have great performances on both short and free. My short program was beyond my practice level and free skating was within the range of my practice level. Lessons I learned from this competition are that I can push my level higher as long as I practice hard", she went on.

Fellow skater Akiko Suzuki consolidated her second placement in the short with a mostly error free skating. She landed six triples in her routine to "O" from Cirque du Soleil, earning 124.43 points with a total of 190.08.

"Overall it was okay, it was good, because in the competition just before that (a national event) I did very badly. My aim was to redeem myself in this competition. I talked to my coach a lot about how to become stronger mentally before the competition", the 27-year-old commented.

Kanako Murakami held onto third place with 116.99 for her tango themed program with a total of 181.03.

"The jumps were okay however my skating was not powerful enough. My coach told me that as well. I only focused on my jumps so that is the reason I could not care about the skating. I definitely got my confidence after my short program in this competition. But my task is to skate more powerfully in both short program and free skating. That is what I want to do at Worlds", the National silver medalist noted.

American skater Christina Gao was the highest ranked skater from her nation earning a fifth place rank in the free skating of 113.94 to finish fourth overall with 176.28. China's Li Zijun jumped from tenth to fifth earning 115.91 to finish fourth in the free skating and fifth overall all. Gracie Gold finished sixth with 166.66 points after making numerous errors. Canada's Kaetlyn Osmond was the highest of the Canadian ladies earning 103.16 points for a total of 159.38 and a seventh-place finish.

==== Ice dancing ====
The final event of the competition was the free dance and the battle for Gold and Bronze was fierce. Meryl Davis / Charlie White from the United States executed a solid program earning level fours in all but one of the elements and tens for performance, choreography and interpretation to earn a new personal best score for the Free Dance of 112.68 and earning a total competition score of 187.36. Skating to "Notre Dame de Paris", the new champions told of the work required to reclaim the Four Continents Championships Ice dancing title which they lost to Virtue and Moir in Colorado Springs.

"It was a really emotional skate. We gave it everything we had, literally, and that's all we can ask of ourselves. It's difficult coming off nationals so to be able to go out and perform the way we did is a monument to our preparation and I'm really proud", White said. "We would like to show our best skating yet. Charlie and I have been talking a lot this week about growth and improvement. That's always what we look back to ... how we can improve, how we can continue to grow throughout the season. We're in a great place but the sky's the limit", Davis added.

In the lead after the short dance, Olympic champions Tessa Virtue / Scott Moir began their Carmen routine with confidence until leg cramps from Tessa forced them to temporarily stop three minutes into their routine, just before their combination lift. They were allowed to continue and they finished the program with Tessa feeling unwell. Despite the incident, it was the downgrades in both the step sequences and not the interruption that cost Virtue / Moir points, dropping from the gold position with a second place score of 109.20 with a total of 184.32.

Despite feeling deflated, the Canadians talked to reporters about the positive achievements they accomplished this week.

"Tessa and I feel like as a team we have a lot of positive things this week, especially in our short dance. In the free dance, we were able to execute a lot of the elements that we've been struggling with in practice and a little bit at the National Championships. Obviously there are a couple of things we want to work on going into the World Championships. We know what we have to do, luckily", Moir told the press. "I just had some cramp in my legs to deal with. I'm glad we collected ourselves and kept pushing through the program", Virtue explained when asked about the interruption.

American skaters Madison Chock / Evan Bates held of a strong field to finish in third with 160.42 total, despite finishing fifth in the free dance.

"As the season has progressed, we have gotten stronger and stronger. Worlds is the culmination of the full season and all of our hard work. Our goal is to have the best two performances we have had all season and carry that momentum into the Olympic year", Bates noted.

Siblings Maia Shibutani / Alex Shibutani earned 96.71 in the free dance to finish fourth overall with 159.97 points, 0.45 behind Chock and Bates. Piper Gilles / Paul Poirier finished third in the free dance with 97.93 to finish fifth overall with 157.83. Japan's Cathy Reed / Chris Reed were the highest ranked Japanese team. A fall on the diagonal step sequence dropped them from sixth to seventh place, earning 77.07 with a total of 131.04. Australia's Danielle O'Brien / Gregory Merriman cleanly skated an engaging circus themed free dance to earn a personal best score of 75.07 to finish in eighth place on 123.88, a personal best ranking and score.

== Results ==
=== Men ===
==== Final results ====
Rank	Name	Nation	Total points	SP		FS	
1	Kevin Reynolds	Canada	250.55	6	78.34	1	172.21
2	Yuzuru Hanyu	Japan	246.38	1	87.65	3	158.73
3	Yan Han	China	235.22	2	85.08	5	150.14
4	Max Aaron	United States	234.65	10	72.46	2	162.19
5	Richard Dornbush	United States	234.04	3	83.01	4	151.03
6	Song Nan	China	228.46	5	81.16	6	147.30
7	Daisuke Takahashi	Japan	222.77	4	82.62	8	140.15
8	Takahito Mura	Japan	218.08	8	78.03	9	140.05
9	Ross Miner	United States	214.36	9	74.01	7	140.35
10	Andrei Rogozine	Canada	201.99	11	70.58	11	131.41
11	Misha Ge	Uzbekistan	201.71	12	70.26	10	131.45
12	Denis Ten	Kazakhstan	197.26	7	78.05	17	119.21
13	Wang Yi	China	195.01	13	68.24	13	126.77
14	Christopher Caluza	Philippines	186.79	16	58.53	12	128.26
15	Abzal Rakimgaliev	Kazakhstan	185.81	15	60.83	14	124.98
16	Michael Christian Martinez	Philippines	178.08	14	64.02	18	113.46
17	Lee June-hyoung	South Korea	176.39	18	55.63	16	120.76
18	Elladj Balde	Canada	176.33	20	51.91	15	124.42
19	Kim Jin-seo	South Korea	171.01	17	58.04	19	112.97
20	Kim Min-seok	South Korea	137.63	21	51.43	20	86.20
21	Brendan Kerry	Australia	134.26	19	53.37	21	80.89
22	Jordan Ju	Chinese Taipei	121.11	22	42.78	22	78.33
23	David Kranjec	Australia	115.82	23	40.51	23	75.31

==== Short program ====
Pl.	Name	Nation	TSS	TES	PCS	SS	TR	PE	CH	IN	Ded.	StN.
1	Yuzuru Hanyu	Japan	87.65	44.22	43.43	8.75	8.43	8.75	8.68	8.82	0.00	#23
2	Yan Han	China	85.08	47.30	37.78	7.82	7.25	7.64	7.57	7.50	0.00	#19
3	Richard Dornbush	United States	83.01	45.48	37.53	7.50	7.32	7.75	7.50	7.46	0.00	#14
4	Daisuke Takahashi	Japan	82.62	41.98	41.64	8.39	8.11	8.18	8.46	8.50	1.00	#22
5	Song Nan	China	81.16	44.83	36.33	7.29	6.96	7.43	7.29	7.36	0.00	#16
6	Kevin Reynolds	Canada	78.34	40.27	38.07	7.54	7.43	7.71	7.71	7.68	0.00	#21
7	Denis Ten	Kazakhstan	78.05	40.81	37.24	7.46	7.25	7.57	7.46	7.50	0.00	#18
8	Takahito Mura	Japan	78.03	41.64	36.39	7.32	7.00	7.46	7.36	7.25	0.00	#17
9	Ross Miner	United States	74.01	37.91	36.10	7.32	6.96	7.36	7.25	7.21	0.00	#12
10	Max Aaron	United States	72.46	38.54	34.92	7.21	6.64	7.07	7.07	6.93	1.00	#15
11	Andrei Rogozine	Canada	70.58	39.36	31.22	6.36	5.93	6.50	6.25	6.18	0.00	#2
12	Misha Ge	Uzbekistan	70.26	33.83	36.43	7.04	7.00	7.36	7.32	7.71	0.00	#20
13	Wang Yi	China	68.24	37.77	30.47	6.25	5.68	6.36	6.25	5.93	0.00	#11
14	Michael Christian Martinez	Philippines	64.62	36.05	28.57	5.50	5.46	5.93	5.75	5.93	0.00	#5
15	Abzal Rakimgaliev	Kazakhstan	60.83	31.43	29.40	5.86	5.54	5.96	6.00	6.04	0.00	#13
16	Christopher Caluza	Philippines	58.53	28.39	30.14	5.93	6.11	5.82	6.14	6.14	0.00	#7
17	Kim Jin-seo	South Korea	58.04	32.23	25.81	5.43	4.71	5.39	5.21	5.07	0.00	#8
18	Lee June-hyoung	South Korea	55.63	29.66	25.97	5.25	4.93	5.21	5.29	5.29	0.00	#9
19	Brendan Kerry	Australia	53.37	28.06	25.31	5.25	4.96	5.07	5.14	4.89	0.00	#1
20	Elladj Balde	Canada	51.91	23.98	28.93	5.89	5.57	5.79	5.86	5.82	1.00	#6
21	Kim Min-seok	South Korea	51.43	26.11	25.32	5.32	4.79	5.14	5.14	4.93	0.00	#3
22	Jordan Ju	Chinese Taipei	42.78	19.32	23.46	4.86	4.43	4.71	4.82	4.64	0.00	#10
23	David Kranjec	Australia	40.51	17.68	23.83	4.93	4.61	4.75	4.79	4.75	1.00	#4

==== Free skating ====
Pl.	Name	Nation	TSS	TES	PCS	SS	TR	PE	CH	IN	Ded.	StN.
1	Kevin Reynolds	Canada	172.21	92.21	80.00	7.82	7.75	8.11	8.14	8.18	0.00	#21
2	Max Aaron	United States	162.19	89.63	72.56	7.64	6.79	7.50	7.21	7.14	0.00	#17
3	Yuzuru Hanyu	Japan	158.73	76.95	81.78	8.39	8.07	8.00	8.29	8.14	0.00	#19
4	Richard Dornbush	United States	151.03	75.39	75.64	7.75	7.46	7.57	7.50	7.54	0.00	#18
5	Yan Han	China	150.14	75.78	75.36	7.82	7.32	7.61	7.57	7.36	1.00	#20
6	Song Nan	China	147.30	74.72	72.58	7.32	7.11	7.36	7.36	7.14	0.00	#23
7	Ross Miner	United States	140.35	68.77	72.58	7.43	7.07	7.18	7.32	7.29	1.00	#13
8	Daisuke Takahashi	Japan	140.15	58.81	82.34	8.32	8.18	7.96	8.25	8.46	1.00	#22
9	Takahito Mura	Japan	140.05	70.05	70.00	7.36	6.71	7.11	7.00	6.82	0.00	#15
10	Misha Ge	Uzbekistan	131.45	64.09	68.36	6.46	6.50	6.89	7.04	7.29	1.00	#12
11	Andrei Rogozine	Canada	131.41	64.63	66.78	6.82	6.61	6.64	6.71	6.61	0.00	#16
12	Christopher Caluza	Philippines	128.26	62.56	65.70	6.32	6.39	6.75	6.64	6.75	0.00	#10
13	Wang Yi	China	126.77	67.49	59.28	6.21	5.82	5.93	5.89	5.79	0.00	#7
14	Abzal Rakimgaliev	Kazakhstan	124.98	66.34	58.64	5.82	5.64	5.89	6.04	5.93	0.00	#6
15	Elladj Balde	Canada	124.42	66.26	59.16	6.00	5.54	5.86	6.04	6.14	1.00	#4
16	Lee June-hyoung	South Korea	120.76	64.82	55.94	5.68	5.43	5.68	5.64	5.54	0.00	#9
17	Denis Ten	Kazakhstan	119.21	50.73	70.48	7.11	6.89	6.89	7.21	7.14	2.00	#14
18	Michael Christian Martinez	Philippines	113.46	59.44	54.02	5.36	5.29	5.57	5.36	5.43	0.00	#8
19	Kim Jin-seo	South Korea	112.97	59.75	54.22	5.61	5.04	5.50	5.46	5.50	1.00	#11
20	Kim Min-seok	South Korea	86.20	40.42	45.78	5.00	4.46	4.54	4.64	4.25	0.00	#1
21	Brendan Kerry	Australia	80.89	38.03	43.86	4.64	4.36	4.18	4.54	4.21	1.00	#2
22	Jordan Ju	Chinese Taipei	78.33	38.91	41.42	4.36	3.96	4.14	4.25	4.00	2.00	#5
23	David Kranjec	Australia	75.31	34.37	43.94	4.61	4.43	4.21	4.43	4.29	3.00	#3

=== Ladies ===
==== Final results ====
Rank	Name	Nation	Total points	SP		FS	
1	Mao Asada	Japan	205.45	1	74.49	1	130.96
2	Akiko Suzuki	Japan	190.08	2	65.65	2	124.43
3	Kanako Murakami	Japan	181.03	3	64.04	3	116.99
4	Christina Gao	United States	176.28	4	62.34	5	113.94
5	Zijun Li	China	170.42	10	54.51	4	115.91
6	Gracie Gold	United States	166.66	5	60.36	6	106.30
7	Kaetlyn Osmond	Canada	159.38	8	56.22	7	103.16
8	Agnes Zawadzki	United States	158.99	7	57.45	8	101.54
9	Amélie Lacoste	Canada	155.08	9	54.74	9	100.34
10	Zhang Kexin	China	148.34	6	57.56	11	90.78
11	Julianne Séguin	Canada	146.58	12	46.82	10	99.76
12	Brooklee Han	Australia	134.90	11	48.54	12	86.36
13	Reyna Hamui	Mexico	123.69	14	43.72	13	79.97
14	Chantelle Kerry	Australia	118.11	13	43.93	14	74.18
15	Crystal Kiang	Chinese Taipei	109.15	18	37.99	15	71.16
16	Park Yeon-jun	South Korea	106.79	15	39.78	18	67.01
17	Melissa Bulanhagui	Philippines	106.36	17	38.58	17	67.78
18	Lejeanne Marais	South Africa	105.06	19	34.28	16	70.78
19	Melinda Wang	Chinese Taipei	96.95	16	39.75	20	57.20
20	Ami Parekh	India	88.39	20	30.07	19	58.32

==== Short program ====
Pl.	Name	Nation	TSS	TES	PCS	SS	TR	PE	CH	IN	Ded.	StN.
1	Mao Asada	Japan	74.49	40.63	33.86	8.50	8.04	8.61	8.50	8.68	0.00	#20
2	Akiko Suzuki	Japan	65.65	34.71	30.94	7.82	7.39	7.89	7.75	7.82	0.00	#18
3	Kanako Murakami	Japan	64.04	34.77	29.27	7.50	7.07	7.32	7.36	7.32	0.00	#17
4	Christina Gao	United States	62.34	33.59	28.75	7.11	7.00	7.29	7.29	7.25	0.00	#12
5	Gracie Gold	United States	60.36	32.11	28.25	7.14	6.89	7.04	7.07	7.18	0.00	#19
6	Zhang Kexin	China	57.56	33.14	24.42	6.43	5.89	6.07	6.14	6.00	0.00	#19
7	Agnes Zawadzki	United States	57.45	31.44	27.01	6.86	6.57	6.71	6.86	6.75	1.00	#15
8	Kaetlyn Osmond	Canada	56.22	28.68	28.54	7.04	7.04	7.18	7.21	7.21	1.00	#13
9	Amélie Lacoste	Canada	54.74	29.27	26.47	6.68	6.43	6.64	6.68	6.68	1.00	#11
10	Li Zijun	China	54.51	29.25	25.26	6.46	6.11	6.39	6.32	6.29	0.00	#14
11	Brooklee Han	Australia	48.54	27.74	20.80	5.21	5.00	5.36	5.21	5.21	0.00	#9
12	Julianne Séguin	Canada	46.82	25.82	21.00	5.43	4.93	5.32	5.21	5.36	0.00	#4
13	Chantelle Kerry	Australia	43.93	25.31	18.62	4.79	4.46	4.68	4.68	4.68	0.00	#7
14	Reyna Hamui	Mexico	43.72	24.76	18.96	4.89	4.43	4.93	4.71	4.75	0.00	#8
15	Park Yeon-jun	South Korea	39.78	22.24	17.54	4.57	4.14	4.43	4.54	4.25	0.00	#1
16	Melinda Wang	Chinese Taipei	39.75	22.12	18.63	4.54	4.46	4.82	4.71	4.75	1.00	#3
17	Melissa Bulanhagui	Philippines	38.58	19.75	18.83	4.82	4.50	4.75	4.68	4.79	0.00	#10
18	Crystal Kiang	Chinese Taipei	37.99	21.07	16.92	4.04	3.96	4.36	4.32	4.46	0.00	#5
19	Lejeanne Marais	South Africa	34.28	18.13	17.15	4.43	4.04	4.29	4.36	4.32	1.00	#6
20	Ami Parekh	India	30.07	14.33	15.74	4.18	3.57	4.07	3.93	3.93	0.00	#2

==== Free skating ====
Pl.	Name	Nation	TSS	TES	PCS	SS	TR	PE	CH	IN	Ded.	StN.
1	Mao Asada	Japan	130.96	63.20	67.76	8.43	8.07	8.57	8.57	8.71	0.00	#19
2	Akiko Suzuki	Japan	124.43	60.10	64.33	8.14	7.68	8.18	8.07	8.14	0.00	#20
3	Kanako Murakami	Japan	116.99	55.83	61.16	7.68	7.36	7.68	7.71	7.79	0.00	#17
4	Li Zijun	China	115.91	61.69	54.22	6.86	6.46	6.96	6.89	6.71	0.00	#11
5	Christina Gao	United States	113.94	57.06	57.88	7.29	7.07	7.25	7.32	7.25	1.00	#18
6	Gracie Gold	United States	106.30	50.57	56.73	7.29	7.00	6.96	7.14	7.07	1.00	#16
7	Kaetlyn Osmond	Canada	103.16	48.72	55.44	6.93	6.86	6.82	7.00	7.04	1.00	#14
8	Agnes Zawadzki	United States	101.54	47.53	55.01	6.96	6.64	6.82	7.00	6.96	1.00	#13
9	Amélie Lacoste	Canada	100.34	46.50	53.84	6.79	6.54	6.75	6.79	6.79	0.00	#15
10	Julianne Séguin	Canada	99.76	53.88	45.88	5.79	5.54	5.89	5.71	5.75	0.00	#10
11	Zhang Kexin	China	90.78	46.89	43.89	6.04	5.29	5.39	5.54	5.18	0.00	#12
12	Brooklee Han	Australia	86.36	46.85	40.51	5.18	4.82	5.11	5.07	5.14	1.00	#6
13	Reyna Hamui	Mexico	79.97	43.18	38.79	5.11	4.46	4.96	4.82	4.89	2.00	#9
14	Chantelle Kerry	Australia	74.18	37.57	37.61	4.75	4.46	4.86	4.75	4.68	1.00	#7
15	Crystal Kiang	Chinese Taipei	71.16	36.36	34.80	4.14	4.11	4.50	4.39	4.61	0.00	#2
16	Lejeanne Marais	South Africa	70.78	37.37	34.41	4.43	3.96	4.36	4.36	4.39	1.00	#1
17	Melissa Bulanhagui	Philippines	67.78	36.56	34.22	4.57	4.07	4.21	4.29	4.25	3.00	#5
18	Park Yeon-jun	South Korea	67.01	31.89	36.12	4.89	4.21	4.61	4.50	4.36	1.00	#8
19	Ami Parekh	India	58.32	27.37	31.95	4.32	3.54	4.18	4.00	3.93	1.00	#3
20	Melinda Wang	Chinese Taipei	57.20	28.23	32.97	4.36	3.93	3.89	4.14	4.29	4.00	#4

=== Pairs ===
==== Final results ====
Rank	Name	Nation	Total points	SP		FS	
1	Meagan Duhamel / Eric Radford	Canada	199.18	1	70.44	2	128.74
2	Kirsten Moore-Towers / Dylan Moscovitch	Canada	196.78	2	66.33	1	130.45
3	Marissa Castelli / Simon Shnapir	United States	170.10	3	53.06	3	117.04
4	Felicia Zhang / Nathan Bartholomay	United States	167.30	4	52.98	4	114.32
5	Peng Cheng / Zhang Hao	China	164.82	5	52.46	6	112.36
6	Paige Lawrence / Rudi Swiegers	Canada	162.30	7	48.76	5	113.54
7	Wang Wenting / Zhang Yan	China	145.56	6	51.26	7	94.30
WD	Alexa Scimeca / Chris Knierim	United States		WD			

==== Short program ====
Pl.	Name	Nation	TSS	TES	PCS	SS	TR	PE	CH	IN	Ded.	StN.
1	Meagan Duhamel / Eric Radford	Canada	70.44	40.33	30.11	7.50	7.14	7.71	7.57	7.71	0.00	#6
2	Kirsten Moore-Towers / Dylan Moscovitch	Canada	66.33	36.47	29.86	7.32	7.11	7.50	7.64	7.75	0.00	#8
3	Marissa Castelli / Simon Shnapir	United States	53.06	28.06	26.00	6.46	6.36	6.43	6.54	6.71	1.00	#5
4	Felicia Zhang / Nathan Bartholomay	United States	52.98	29.60	24.38	6.07	5.86	6.11	6.25	6.18	1.00	#4
5	Peng Cheng / Zhang Hao	China	52.46	27.95	24.51	6.39	5.93	5.96	6.29	6.07	0.00	#1
6	Wang Wenting / Zhang Yan	China	51.26	28.87	22.39	5.68	5.43	5.54	5.68	5.68	0.00	#2
7	Paige Lawrence / Rudi Swiegers	Canada	48.76	25.13	25.63	6.61	6.25	6.18	6.54	6.46	2.00	#7
WD	Alexa Scimeca / Chris Knierim	United States										#3

==== Free skating ====
Pl.	Name	Nation	TSS	TES	PCS	SS	TR	PE	CH	IN	Ded.	StN.
1	Kirsten Moore-Towers / Dylan Moscovitch	Canada	130.45	68.14	63.31	7.75	7.61	7.93	8.14	8.14	1.00	#7
2	Meagan Duhamel / Eric Radford	Canada	128.74	68.06	60.68	7.54	7.43	7.50	7.82	7.64	0.00	#4
3	Marissa Castelli / Simon Shnapir	United States	117.04	59.03	58.01	7.21	7.11	7.14	7.36	7.43	0.00	#6
4	Felicia Zhang / Nathan Bartholomay	United States	114.32	61.27	54.05	6.64	6.43	6.75	6.96	7.00	1.00	#5
5	Paige Lawrence / Rudi Swiegers	Canada	113.54	61.15	52.39	6.61	6.39	6.57	6.71	6.46	0.00	#1
6	Peng Cheng / Zhang Hao	China	112.36	62.67	50.69	6.46	6.11	6.32	6.54	6.25	1.00	#3
7	Wang Wenting / Zhang Yan	China	94.30	51.96	42.34	5.54	5.14	5.21	5.36	5.21	0.00	#2

=== Ice dancing ===
==== Final results ====
Rank	Name	Nation	Total points	SD		FD	
1	Meryl Davis / Charlie White	United States	187.36	2	74.68	1	112.68
2	Tessa Virtue / Scott Moir	Canada	184.32	1	75.12	2	109.20
3	Madison Chock / Evan Bates	United States	160.42	3	65.44	5	94.98
4	Maia Shibutani / Alex Shibutani	United States	159.97	4	63.26	4	96.71
5	Piper Gilles / Paul Poirier	Canada	157.83	5	60.20	3	97.63
6	Nicole Orford / Thomas Williams	Canada	139.10	7	53.70	6	85.40
7	Cathy Reed / Chris Reed	Japan	131.04	6	53.97	7	77.07
8	Danielle O'Brien / Gregory Merriman	Australia	123.88	8	48.81	8	75.07
9	Yu Xiaoyang / Wang Chen	China	108.82	11	43.17	9	65.65
10	Anna Nagornyuk / Viktor Kovalenko	Uzbekistan	107.02	10	43.32	10	63.70
11	Emi Hirai / Marien de la Asuncion	Japan	105.56	9	44.72	11	60.84
12	Bryna Oi / Taiyo Mizutani	Japan	89.80	12	33.90	12	55.90
13	Pilar Maekawa Moreno / Leonardo Maekawa Moreno	Mexico	85.02	13	33.37	13	51.65

==== Short dance ====
Pl.	Name	Nation	TSS	TES	PCS	SS	TR	PE	CH	IN	Ded.	StN.
1	Tessa Virtue / Scott Moir	Canada	75.12	37.50	37.62	9.29	9.19	9.50	9.50	9.54	0.00	#7
2	Meryl Davis / Charlie White	United States	74.68	36.86	37.82	9.32	9.43	9.39	9.61	9.50	0.00	#12
3	Madison Chock / Evan Bates	United States	65.44	33.79	31.65	7.82	7.46	7.96	8.07	8.14	0.00	#11
4	Maia Shibutani / Alex Shibutani	United States	63.26	32.07	31.19	7.82	7.54	7.86	7.86	7.86	0.00	#10
5	Piper Gilles / Paul Poirier	Canada	60.20	30.50	29.70	7.36	7.25	7.43	7.54	7.50	0.00	#6
6	Cathy Reed / Chris Reed	Japan	53.97	28.79	25.18	6.21	6.07	6.29	6.50	6.36	0.00	#9
7	Nicole Orford / Thomas Williams	Canada	53.70	26.79	26.91	6.68	6.46	6.93	6.86	6.71	0.00	#13
8	Danielle O'Brien / Gregory Merriman	Australia	48.81	27.00	21.81	5.46	5.25	5.36	5.64	5.50	0.00	#4
9	Emi Hirai / Marien de la Asuncion	Japan	44.72	24.43	20.29	5.00	4.82	4.96	5.25	5.25	0.00	#3
10	Anna Nagornyuk / Viktor Kovalenko	Uzbekistan	43.32	22.14	21.18	5.54	5.07	5.36	5.25	5.25	0.00	#5
11	Yu Xiaoyang / Wang Chen	China	43.17	20.57	22.60	5.71	5.61	5.54	5.68	5.68	0.00	#8
12	Bryna Oi / Taiyo Mizutani	Japan	33.90	16.79	17.11	4.32	4.18	4.36	4.36	4.18	0.00	#1
13	Pilar Maekawa Moreno / Leonardo Maekawa Moreno	Mexico	33.37	16.35	17.02	4.39	4.07	4.39	4.00	4.39	0.00	#2

==== Free dance ====
Pl.	Name	Nation	TSS	TES	PCS	SS	TR	PE	CH	IN	Ded.	StN.
1	Meryl Davis / Charlie White	United States	112.68	54.94	57.74	9.54	9.43	9.71	9.71	9.89	0.00	#9
2	Tessa Virtue / Scott Moir	Canada	109.20	52.73	56.47	9.39	9.25	9.25	9.75	9.54	0.00	#10
3	Piper Gilles / Paul Poirier	Canada	97.63	50.35	47.28	7.89	7.71	7.89	8.04	8.00	0.00	#11
4	Maia Shibutani / Alex Shibutani	United States	96.71	47.07	49.64	8.39	7.96	8.43	8.36	8.43	0.00	#13
5	Madison Chock / Evan Bates	United States	94.98	47.30	47.68	8.00	7.68	7.96	8.14	8.14	0.00	#12
6	Nicole Orford / Thomas Williams	Canada	85.40	44.30	41.10	6.75	6.75	6.68	7.21	6.96	0.00	#6
7	Cathy Reed / Chris Reed	Japan	77.07	39.70	38.37	6.46	6.04	6.43	6.68	6.61	1.00	#7
8	Danielle O'Brien / Gregory Merriman	Australia	75.07	40.99	34.08	5.50	5.46	5.71	6.07	5.86	0.00	#5
9	Yu Xiaoyang / Wang Chen	China	65.65	35.21	30.44	5.25	4.93	5.11	5.18	4.96	0.00	#1
10	Anna Nagornyuk / Viktor Kovalenko	Uzbekistan	63.70	32.18	32.52	5.46	5.21	5.39	5.57	5.61	1.00	#3
11	Emi Hirai / Marien de la Asuncion	Japan	60.84	30.51	30.33	5.25	4.79	5.07	5.25	5.07	0.00	#8
12	Bryna Oi / Taiyo Mizutani	Japan	55.90	29.60	27.30	4.61	4.39	4.50	4.79	4.57	1.00	#4
13	Pilar Maekawa Moreno / Leonardo Maekawa Moreno	Mexico	51.65	26.28	25.37	4.21	4.18	4.07	4.36	4.36	0.00	#2

== Medals summary ==
=== Medalists ===
Medals awarded to the skaters who achieve the highest overall placements in each discipline:

Discipline	Gold	Silver	Bronze
Men	(Canada) Kevin Reynolds	(Japan) Yuzuru Hanyu	(China) Yan Han
Ladies	(Japan) Mao Asada	(Japan) Akiko Suzuki	(Japan) Kanako Murakami
Pair skating	(Canada) Meagan Duhamel / Eric Radford	(Canada) Kirsten Moore-Towers / Dylan Moscovitch	(United States) Marissa Castelli / Simon Shnapir
Ice dancing	(United States) Meryl Davis / Charlie White	(Canada) Tessa Virtue / Scott Moir	(United States) Madison Chock / Evan Bates

Small medals awarded to the skaters who achieve the highest short program or short dance placements in each discipline:

Discipline	Gold	Silver	Bronze
Men	(Japan) Yuzuru Hanyu	(China) Yan Han	(United States) Richard Dornbush
Ladies	(Japan) Mao Asada	(Japan) Akiko Suzuki	(Japan) Kanako Murakami
Pair skating	(Canada) Meagan Duhamel / Eric Radford	(Canada) Kirsten Moore-Towers / Dylan Moscovitch	(United States) Marissa Castelli / Simon Shnapir
Ice dancing	(Canada) Tessa Virtue / Scott Moir	(United States) Meryl Davis / Charlie White	(United States) Madison Chock / Evan Bates

Medals awarded to the skaters who achieve the highest free skating or free dance placements in each discipline:

Discipline	Gold	Silver	Bronze
Men	(Canada) Kevin Reynolds	(United States) Max Aaron	(Japan) Yuzuru Hanyu
Ladies	(Japan) Mao Asada	(Japan) Akiko Suzuki	(Japan) Kanako Murakami
Pair skating	(Canada) Kirsten Moore-Towers / Dylan Moscovitch	(Canada) Meagan Duhamel / Eric Radford	(United States) Marissa Castelli / Simon Shnapir
Ice dancing	(United States) Meryl Davis / Charlie White	(Canada) Tessa Virtue / Scott Moir	(Canada) Piper Gilles / Paul Poirier

=== Medals by country ===
Table of medals for overall placement:

Rank	Nation	Gold	Silver	Bronze	Total
1	Canada (CAN)	2	2	0	4
2	Japan (JPN)	1	2	1	4
3	United States (USA)	1	0	2	3
4	China (CHN)	0	0	1	1
Totals (4 entries)		4	4	4	12
