= Simon Shnapir =

American pair skater

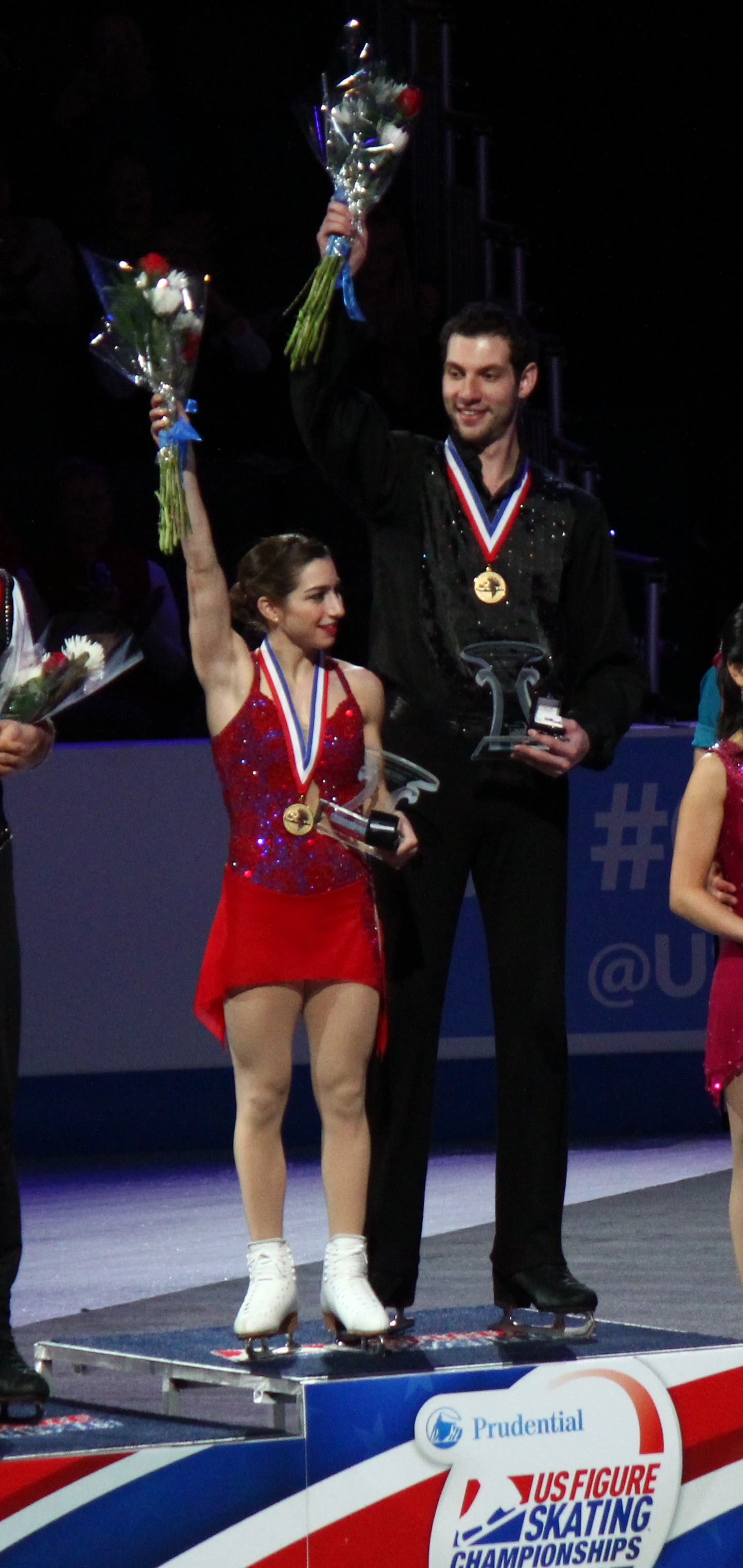
- Castelli and Shnapir atop the medal podium at the 2013 U.S. Championships

Personal information
- Born: August 20, 1987 (age 39) Moscow, Russian SFSR, Soviet Union
- Home town: Sudbury, Massachusetts
- Height: 6 ft 4 in (193 cm)

Figure skating career
- Country: United States
- Partner: DeeDee Leng, Marissa Castelli, Tanya Aziz, Courtney Gill
- Coach: Robert Martin, Carrie Wall, Mark Mitchell
- Skating club: SC of Boston
- Began skating: 1993
- Retired: June 30, 2015
Olympic Games
Bronze medal – third place	2014 Sochi	Team
Four Continents Championships
Bronze medal – third place	2013 Osaka	Pairs
U.S. Championships
Gold medal – first place	2013 Omaha	Pairs
Gold medal – first place	2014 Boston	Pairs
World Team Trophy
Gold medal – first place	2013 Tokyo	Team
World Junior Championships
Bronze medal – third place	2009 Sofia	Pairs

Simon Shnapir (born August 20, 1987) is an American former competitive pair skater. With Marissa Castelli, he is the 2013 Four Continents bronze medalist, the 2009 World Junior bronze medalist, and a two-time U.S. national champion (2013 & 2014). The pair won a bronze medal in the team event at the 2014 Winter Olympics. After their split in May 2014, Shnapir teamed up with DeeDee Leng and competed in the 2014–15 season.

== Personal life ==
Shnapir was born to Jewish parents, both chemical engineering graduates, in Moscow, Russian SFSR, Soviet Union. He arrived in the United States with his family when he was 16 months old. After living in Brighton, Boston for a few years, the family moved to Sudbury, Massachusetts.

Shnapir graduated from Lincoln-Sudbury Regional High School in 2005, and went on to major in marketing at Emerson College.

== Career ==
Shnapir began learning to skate in 1993. Early in his pairs career, he skated with Tanya Aziz and Courtney Gill. Bobby Martin became his coach in around 2000.

=== Partnership with Castelli ===
Shnapir and Marissa Castelli teamed up in April 2006 and began training together in earnest in June. They trained in Boston, coached by Bobby Martin, Carrie Wall (technical), Mark Mitchell (in-betweens, polishing), and Peter Johansson (throws). Castelli broke Shnapir's nose once while they were practicing the twist.

Castelli/Shnapir qualified for the 2008 Junior Grand Prix Final and placed sixth. The pair won the bronze medal at the 2009 World Junior Championships.

In the 2009–10 season, Castelli was off the ice for a month after a collision with an Italian skater resulting in 15 stitches to her inner thigh. The pair placed tenth on the senior level at the 2010 U.S. Championships and were sent to the 2010 Four Continents Championships where they also finished tenth.

In 2012, Castelli/Shnapir split up for a month but decided to recommit to their partnership. They won gold at the 2012 Ice Challenge and then won bronze, their first Grand Prix medal, at the 2012 NHK Trophy. They won their first national title at the 2013 U.S. Championships. They were assigned to the 2013 Four Continents and won the bronze medal.

Castelli/Shnapir won their second national title at the 2014 U.S. Championships and were named in the U.S. team to the 2014 Winter Olympics, held in February in Sochi, Russia. They won a bronze medal in the team event and placed 9th in the pairs event. In March, Castelli/Shnapir finished 11th at the 2014 World Championships in Saitama, Japan. They announced the end of their partnership on May 7, 2014.

=== Partnership with Leng ===
On May 28, 2014, the Associated Press reported that Shnapir had teamed up with DeeDee Leng. They were coached by Bobby Martin and Carrie Wall at the Skating Club of Boston. For the 2014-2015 Grand Prix season, they were assigned to Rostelecom Cup and NHK Trophy. After having placed 6th and 8th at these competitions, respectively, Leng and Shnapir placed 8th at the 2015 U.S. Championships.

In April 2015, Leng suffered a season-ending concussion during a practice session. On June 30, 2015, Shnapir announced his retirement from competitions. In November 2016, he became the director of the high performance program at the Skating Club of Boston.

== Programs ==
=== With Leng ===
Season	Short program	Free skating
2014–2015	Carmina Burana by Carl Orff performed by Edvin Marton choreo. by Julie Marcotte	Miss Saigon by Claude-Michel Schönberg performed by Sean Alderking choreo. by Julie Marcotte

=== With Castelli ===
Season	Short program	Free skating	Exhibition
2013–2014	Black Magic Woman; Smooth by Santana choreo. by Julie Marcotte	Skyfall by Thomas Newman choreo. by Julie Marcotte	Royals by Lorde; Feeling Good performed by Michael Bublé
2012–2013	Stray Cat Strut by Brian Setzer Orchestra; Pink Panther by Henry Mancini choreo. by Julie Marcotte	Payadora by Julian Plaza choreo. by Julie Marcotte	Feeling Good performed by Michael Bublé
2011–2012	Phantom of the Opera by Andrew Lloyd Webber	Piano Concerto No. 2 by Sergei Rachmaninov	Feeling Good performed by Michael Bublé
2010–2011	Money by Pink Floyd; For the Love of Money by the O'Jays	Avatar by James Horner	
2009–2010	Prelude; Quadukka-l-Mayyas by Jesse Cook	Freedom Battle by Michael W. Smith; Elizabeth: The Golden Age by A. R. Rahman, Craig Armstrong	
2008–2009	Survivor: Guatemala by Russ Landau; Wild Dogs; The Gathering; Ancient Voices of Guatemala	Gladiator by Hans Zimmer, Lisa Gerrard	
2007–2008	Battle Without Honor or Humanity (from Kill Bill Vol. 1) by Tomoyasu Hotei	Gladiator by Hans Zimmer, Lisa Gerrard	
2006–2007	Mon Enfant by George Winston	Salome by Richard Strauss	

== Competitive highlights ==
GP: Grand Prix; JGP: Junior Grand Prix

=== With Leng ===
International
Event	2014–15
GP NHK Trophy	6th
GP Rostelecom Cup	8th
National
U.S. Championships	8th

=== With Castelli ===
International
Event	06–07	07–08	08–09	09–10	10–11	11–12	12–13	13–14
Olympics								9th
Worlds							13th	11th
Four Continents				10th			3rd	
GP Bompard				7th				
GP NHK Trophy						7th	3rd	4th
GP Skate America					6th		5th	6th
GP Skate Canada					4th			
Ice Challenge							1st	
Nepela Memorial						4th		
U.S. Classic								4th
International: Junior
Junior Worlds			3rd					
JGP Final			6th					
JGP Czech Rep.			4th					
JGP Estonia		10th						
JGP United Kingdom			4th					
National
U.S. Champ.	9th N	3rd N	3rd J	10th	5th	5th	1st	1st
East. Sectionals	4th N	1st N		1st				
Team events
Olympics								3rd T
World Team; Trophy							1st T 5th P	
Levels: N = Novice; J = Junior; T = Team result; P = Personal result; Medals awarded for team result only.

== See also ==
- List of select Jewish figure skaters
- List of Jewish Olympic medalists
