= Ami Parekh =

Indian-American figure skater

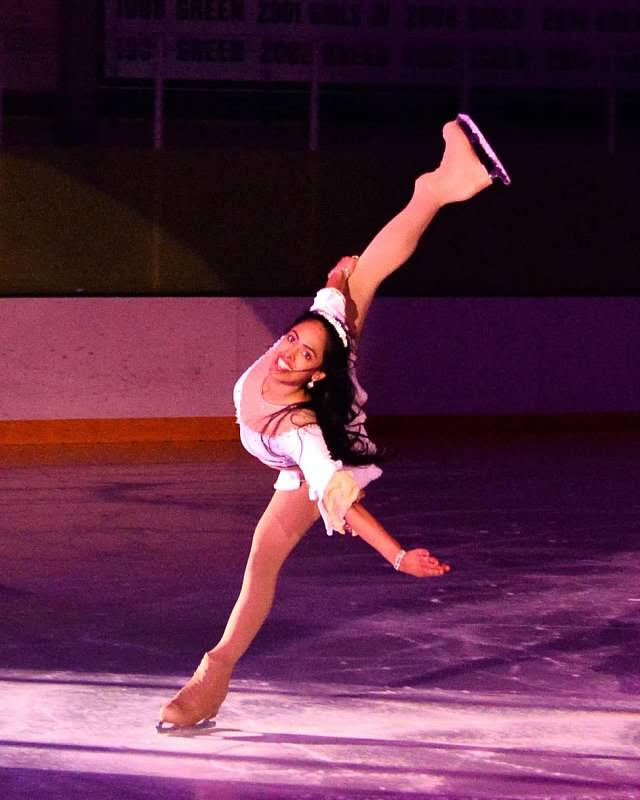
- Parekh at a 2015 Ice Show in Chicago

Personal information
- Born: January 10, 1988 (age 38) Trenton, New Jersey, U.S.
- Home town: Bear, Delaware, U.S.
- Height: 5 ft 6 in (1.68 m)

Figure skating career
- Country: India (2006–2014); United States (until 2004)
- Coach: Jeremy Allen
- Skating club: Skating Club of India
- Began skating: 1997

Ami Parekh (born January 10, 1988) is an Indian-American former competitive figure skater who represented India in international competitions. She is an eight-time Indian ladies' champion. In 2007, she became the first figure skater representing India to compete in a senior ISU event and has competed twice in the World Figure Skating Championships and three times at the Four Continents Figure Skating Championships.

== Personal life ==
She currently practices medicine in the USA as Physical Medicine & Rehabilitation Physician focusing on Sports Medicine & Neuro-Musculoskeletal Medicine.

== Programs ==
Season	Short program	Free skating
2013–2014	Raga-Jazz Style by Shankar Jaikishan	Fantaisie Impromptu by Frédéric Chopin
2012–2013	Nyah (from Mission Impossible 2) by Hans Zimmer	Fantaisie Impromptu by Frédéric Chopin
2011–2012	Nyah (from Mission Impossible 2) by Hans Zimmer	La Bayadere by Ludwig Minkus
2006–2007	Bollywood Mix	La Bayadere by Ludwig Minkus

== Competitive highlights ==
Results
International
Event	03–04	04–05	05–06	06–07	07–08	08–09	09–10	10–11	11–12	12–13	13–14
Worlds				44th					46th		
Four Continents				20th						20th	18th
NRW Trophy											16th
Denkova-Staviski Cup											7th
Nebelhorn Trophy											30th
Golden Spin										15th	
Int. Challenge Cup									20th		5th
U.S. Classic									15th		
International: Junior
JGP Norway				17th							
National
Indian Champs.	1st	1st	1st	1st				1st	1st	1st	1st
JGP = Junior Grand Prix, PR = Preliminary round
