= Marissa Castelli =

American pair skater

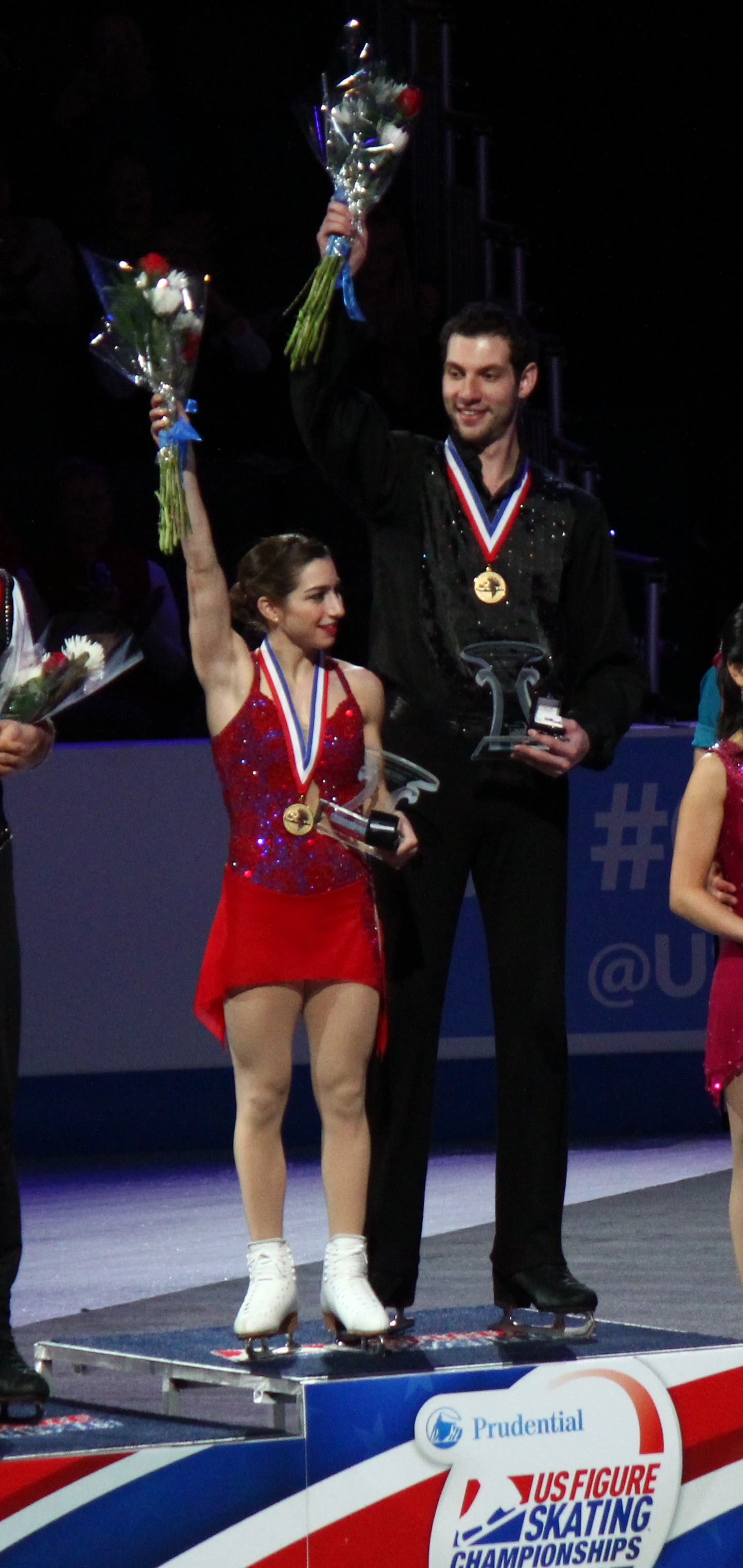
- Castelli and Shnapir atop the medal podium at the 2013 U.S. Championships

Personal information
- Born: August 20, 1990 (age 35) Providence, Rhode Island
- Home town: Cranston, Rhode Island
- Height: 5 ft 0 in (152 cm)

Figure skating career
- Country: United States
- Partner: Mervin Tran
- Coach: Bruno Marcotte, Richard Gauthier, Sylvie Fullum, Bobby Martin
- Skating club: SC of Boston
- Began skating: 1994
- Retired: January 7, 2019
Medal record
Olympic Games
Bronze medal – third place	2014 Sochi	Team
Four Continents Championships
Bronze medal – third place	2013 Osaka	Pairs
U.S. Championships
Gold medal – first place	2013 Omaha	Pairs
Gold medal – first place	2014 Boston	Pairs
Silver medal – second place	2017 Kansas City	Pairs
Bronze medal – third place	2016 Saint Paul	Pairs
World Team Trophy
Gold medal – first place	2013 Tokyo	Team
World Junior Championships
Bronze medal – third place	2009 Sofia	Pairs

Marissa Castelli (born August 20, 1990) is an American retired pair skater. With her skating partner, Mervin Tran, she is the 2017 U.S. national silver medalist.

With her former partner, Simon Shnapir, she is the 2013 Four Continents bronze medalist, the 2009 World Junior bronze medalist, and a two-time U.S. national champion (2013 & 2014). The pair won a bronze medal in the team event at the 2014 Winter Olympics.

== Personal life ==
Castelli was born in Providence, Rhode Island, and graduated from Cranston High School West. She was enrolled at the Community College of Rhode Island before deciding to study sales and marketing at DeVry University. Her brother, Anthony Castelli, played football at Bryant University and her mother, Lori Castelli, is a figure skating coach.

== Early career ==
Castelli began skating at age three and enrolled in U.S. Figure Skating's Basic Skills program when she was about five. Early in her career, she competed as a single skater and also skated pairs with Brad Vigorito.

== Partnership with Shnapir ==
Castelli and Simon Shnapir teamed up in April 2006 and began training together in earnest in June. They trained in Boston, coached by Bobby Martin, Carrie Wall (technical), Mark Mitchell (in-betweens, polishing), and Peter Johansson (throws). Castelli broke Shnapir's nose once while they were practicing the twist.

Castelli/Shnapir qualified for the 2008 Junior Grand Prix Final and placed sixth. The pair won the bronze medal at the 2009 World Junior Championships.

=== 2009–2010 season ===
In the 2009–2010 season, Castelli was off the ice for a month after she collided with an Italian while she was skating backwards and landed on his blade, resulting in 15 stitches to her inner thigh. The pair placed tenth on the senior level at the 2010 U.S. Championships and were sent to the 2010 Four Continents Championships where they also finished tenth.

=== 2012–2013 season ===
In 2012, Castelli/Shnapir split up for a month but decided to recommit to their partnership. They won gold at the 2012 Ice Challenge and then won bronze, their first Grand Prix medal, at the 2012 NHK Trophy. They won their first national title at the 2013 U.S. Championships. They were assigned to the 2013 Four Continents and won the bronze medal.

=== 2013–2014 season ===
Castelli/Shnapir won their second national title at the 2014 U.S. Championships and were named in the U.S. team to the 2014 Winter Olympics, held in February in Sochi, Russia. They won a bronze medal in the team event and placed 9th in the pairs event. In March, Castelli/Shnapir finished 11th at the 2014 World Championships in Saitama, Japan. They announced the end of their partnership on May 7, 2014.

== Partnership with Tran ==
On June 10, 2014, Castelli announced that she and Canada's Mervin Tran had formed a partnership which would train mainly in Montreal under Bruno Marcotte and to a lesser extent at the Skating Club of Boston under Bobby Martin. It was also announced that he was awaiting release from Skate Canada, indicating that they might compete for the United States.

=== 2016–2017 season ===
Tran sustained a concussion in August 2016. After winning bronze at the 2016 CS Autumn Classic International, the pair appeared at two Grand Prix events, placing 7th at the 2016 Skate America and 5th at the 2016 Trophée de France. Castelli accidentally struck Tran with her elbow during training in late December.

== Programs ==
=== With Tran ===
Season	Short program	Free skating	Exhibition
2017–2018	Fallin' by Alicia Keys choreo. by Julie Marcotte	Woman by Shawn Phillips	Groove Is in the Heart by Deee-Lite
2016–2017	Fallin' by Alicia Keys choreo. by Julie Marcotte	Journey medley: Don't Stop Believin'; Open Arms; Any Way You Want It choreo. by Julie Marcotte	Groove Is in the Heart by Deee-Lite
2015–2016	Summertime by George Gershwin choreo. by Julie Marcotte	Journey medley: Don't Stop Believin'; Open Arms; Any Way You Want It choreo. by Julie Marcotte	Try by Pink
2014–2015	Summertime by George Gershwin choreo. by Julie Marcotte	Adiós Nonino by Astor Piazzolla choreo. by Julie Marcotte	Try by Pink

=== With Shnapir ===
Season	Short program	Free skating	Exhibition
2013–2014	Black Magic Woman; Smooth by Santana choreo. by Julie Marcotte	Skyfall by Thomas Newman choreo. by Julie Marcotte	Royals by Lorde; Feeling Good performed by Michael Bublé
2012–2013	Stray Cat Strut by Brian Setzer Orchestra; Pink Panther by Henry Mancini choreo. by Julie Marcotte	Payadora by Julian Plaza choreo. by Julie Marcotte	Feeling Good performed by Michael Bublé
2011–2012	Phantom of the Opera by Andrew Lloyd Webber	Piano Concerto No. 2 by Sergei Rachmaninov	Feeling Good performed by Michael Bublé
2010–2011	Money by Pink Floyd; For the Love of Money by the O'Jays	Avatar by James Horner	
2009–2010	Prelude; Quadukka-l-Mayyas by Jesse Cook	Freedom Battle by Michael W. Smith; Elizabeth: The Golden Age by A.R. Rahman, Craig Armstrong	Billie Jean by Michael Jackson
2008–2009	Survivor: Guatemala by Russ Landau; Wild Dogs; The Gathering; Ancient Voices of Guatemala	Gladiator by Hans Zimmer, Lisa Gerrard	
2007–2008	Battle Without Honor or Humanity (from Kill Bill Vol. 1) by Tomoyasu Hotei	Gladiator by Hans Zimmer, Lisa Gerrard	
2006–2007	Mon Enfant by George Winston	Salome by Richard Strauss	

== Competitive highlights ==
GP: Grand Prix; CS: Challenger Series; JGP: Junior Grand Prix

=== With Tran ===
International
Event	14–15	15–16	16–17	17–18
Four Continents		6th		
GP France		6th	5th	6th
GP Rostelecom Cup				7th
GP Skate America			7th	
GP Skate Canada		4th		
CS Autumn Classic			3rd	4th
CS Golden Spin		5th		
CS U.S. Classic		2nd		
Autumn Classic		2nd		
National
U.S. Championships	6th	3rd	2nd	6th

=== Pairs career with Shnapir ===
International
Event	06–07	07–08	08–09	09–10	10–11	11–12	12–13	13–14
Olympics								9th
Worlds							13th	11th
Four Continents				10th			3rd	
GP Bompard				7th				
GP NHK Trophy						7th	3rd	4th
GP Skate America					6th		5th	6th
GP Skate Canada					4th			
Ice Challenge							1st	
Nepela Memorial						4th		
U.S. Classic								4th
International: Junior
Junior Worlds			3rd					
JGP Final			6th					
JGP Czech Rep.			4th					
JGP Estonia		10th						
JGP United Kingdom			4th					
National
U.S. Champ.	9th N	3rd N	3rd J	10th	5th	5th	1st	1st
East. Sectionals	4th N	1st N		1st				
Team events
Olympics								3rd T
World Team; Trophy							1st T 5th P	
Levels: N = Novice; J = Junior; T = Team result; P = Personal result; Medals awarded for team result only.
