= Elena Radionova =

Russian figure skater

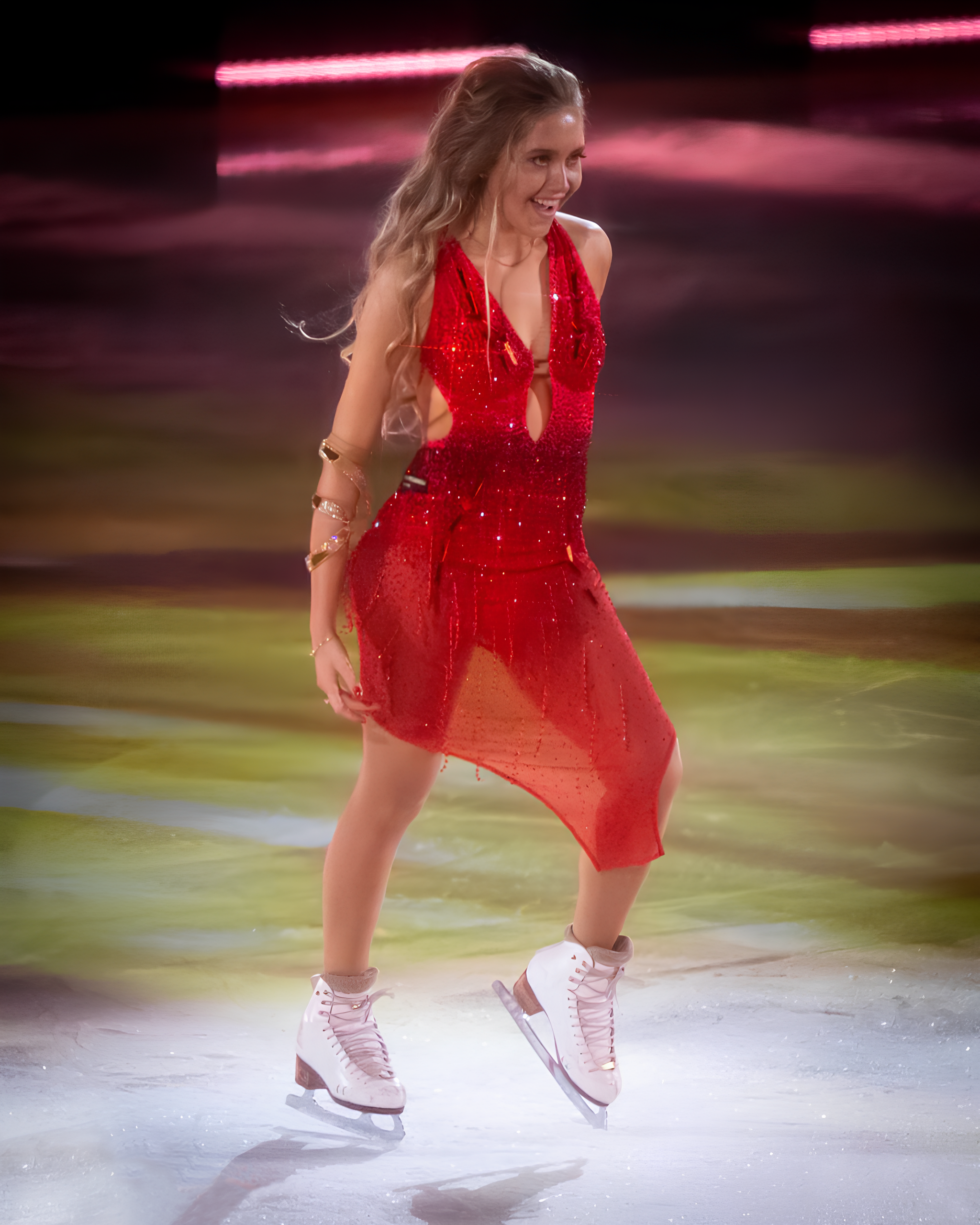
- Radionova in 2023, in a pose for her gala routine

Personal information
- Native name: Елена Игоревна Радионова
- Full name: Elena Igorevna Radionova
- Other names: Yelena Igorevna Radionova
- Born: 6 January 1999 (age 27) Moscow, Russia
- Home town: Moscow, Russia
- Height: 1.67 m (5 ft 5 1/2 in)

Figure skating career
- Country: Russia
- Coach: Elena Buianova
- Skating club: CSKA Moscow
- Began skating: 2002
- Retired: 22 September 2020
Medal record
Representing Russia
Figure skating: Ladies' singles
World Championships
Bronze medal – third place	2015 Shanghai	Ladies' singles
Grand Prix Final
Silver medal – second place	2014–15 Barcelona	Ladies' singles
Bronze medal – third place	2015–16 Barcelona	Ladies' singles
Russian Championships
Gold medal – first place	2015 Sochi	Ladies' singles
Silver medal – second place	2013 Sochi	Ladies' singles
Silver medal – second place	2016 Yekaterinburg	Ladies' singles
Bronze medal – third place	2014 Sochi	Ladies' singles
World Team Trophy
Silver medal – second place	2015 Tokyo	Team
Silver medal – second place	2017 Tokyo	Team
World Junior Championships
Gold medal – first place	2013 Milan	Ladies' singles
Gold medal – first place	2014 Sofia	Ladies' singles
Junior Grand Prix Final
Gold medal – first place	2012–13 Sochi	Ladies' singles

Elena Igorevna Radionova (Russian: Елена Игоревна Радионова; born 6 January 1999) is a former Russian competitive figure skater. She is the 2015 World bronze medalist, two-time (2015–2016) European silver medalist, two-time Grand Prix Final medalist, 2017 Winter Universiade champion and the 2015 Russian national champion. On the junior level, she is the first ladies skater to win two World Junior titles (2013 and 2014). She won the 2012–13 JGP Final.

== Personal life ==
Radionova was born on 6 January 1999 in Moscow, Russia. She is the only child in her family. Her interests include writing lyrics, ballet, modern dancing, and singing. She married football player Konstantin Kuchaev on 5 June 2023.

== Career ==
Radionova's father introduced her to skating when she was three years and nine months old, seeking to align her club foot. Since the age of four, she has been coached by Inna Goncharenko at CSKA Moscow. The People that Radionova look up to are Yuna Kim, Mao Asada, and Carolina Kostner.

=== Early career ===
In the 2010–11 season, Radionova finished 4th at the 2011 Russian Junior Championships. She won 1st place in the Zhuk Memorial kids' competition.

In the 2011–12 season, Radionova appeared at her first senior Russian Championships, finishing 5th, and went on to win the bronze medal at the Russian Junior Championships that same season. Not yet age-eligible for junior ISU events, she competed in the novice event at the 2012 Triglav Trophy, winning the gold medal.

=== 2012–13 season: Junior international debut ===
In the 2012–13 season, Radionova made her ISU Junior Grand Prix debut and won her events in France and Austria. She qualified for the JGP Final in Sochi, where she won the gold medal, finishing more than eleven points ahead of American silver medalist, Hannah Miller.

At the 2013 Russian Championships, Radionova won the silver medal in the senior event ahead of defending champion Adelina Sotnikova and then took the junior title. She placed fifth in the short program and first in the free skate at the 2013 World Junior Championships in Milan, Italy. She was awarded the gold medal, while defending champion Yulia Lipnitskaya took silver and Anna Pogorilaya the bronze — resulting in a Russian sweep of the podium. Radionova later won gold in the junior event at the 2013 Triglav Trophy.

=== 2013–14 season: Senior international debut ===
In an interview before the 2013–14 season, Radionova said, "I don't think that I am such a great athlete that won a lot. I just won the smallest one, Junior Worlds. In reality, there are competitions that are much more serious and more difficult. I don't feel any pressure yet. I just think I have to work harder and more, because there is no limit to perfection."

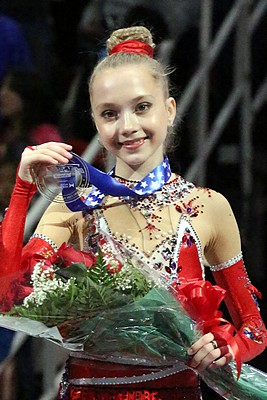
Radionova at the 2013 Skate America, winning bronze for the Russian Federation

Radionova made her senior international debut at the 2013 Nebelhorn Trophy. Placing first in both programs, she won the gold medal by a margin of more than 25 points over two-time world champion Miki Ando from Japan. The 2013 Skate America was Radionova's first senior Grand Prix event. She was awarded the bronze medal at Skate America and then silver at the 2013 NHK Trophy, while gold at both events went to Japan's Mao Asada, whose skating Radionova admires. Radionova's results qualified her to her first Grand Prix Final. At the event in Fukuoka, Japan, she finished fourth overall.

Radionova won the bronze medal at the 2014 Russian Championships after placing third in both the short and long program. Though an injury caused her to miss the Russian junior nationals, she was later added to the Russian team for the 2014 World Junior Championships. At the event, she became the first ladies' single skater to repeat as World Junior champion. Scoring 66.90 points in the short program, 127.39 in the free skate, and 194.29 for the combined total, she broke junior-level ladies' records previously held by Mirai Nagasu and Yulia Lipnitskaya. Radionova, Serafima Sakhanovich, and Evgenia Medvedeva produced Russia's second consecutive sweep of the World Junior ladies' podium. During the off-season, she performed in various Russian cities with Show of the Champions and in Korea with Igor Bobrin's Theatre on Ice.

=== 2014–15 season: World bronze medal ===
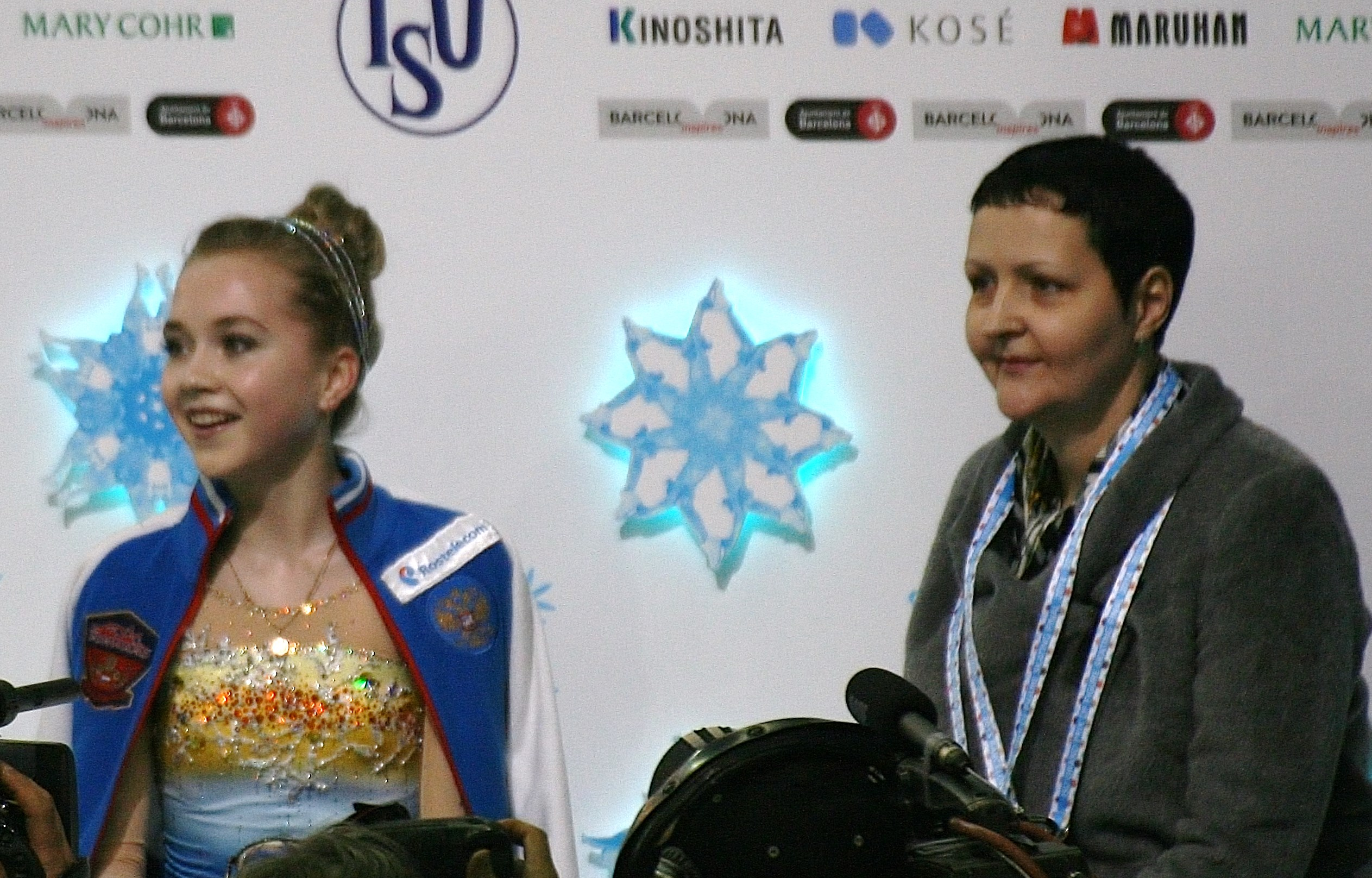
Radionova with her coach Inna Goncharenko at an ISU Championship

Radionova made her season debut at the 2014 Japan Open where she placed first in the ladies' free skate and helped Team Europe win the gold medal. Her Grand Prix assignments were the 2014 Skate America and 2014 Trophée Éric Bompard. At Skate America, Radionova ranked second in the short program, first in the free skate, and won the gold medal by a margin of 5.85 points over compatriot Elizaveta Tuktamysheva. At the Trophée Bompard, Yelena Radionova won gold and set personal best scores. She scored a total of 203.92 points, making her the first ladies' singles skater to score over 200 points this season. The results qualified Radionova for the 2014–15 Grand Prix Final. Although a fever prior to the event reduced her training time, she took the silver medal in Barcelona, finishing behind former teammate Elizaveta Tuktamysheva. At the 2015 Russian Championships, she was first in both segments and won her first national title. Radionova was the silver medalist at the 2015 European Championships where she placed 1st in the short program and second in the free skate. During the 2015 World Championships, she stated that she was feeling ill and weak, having picked up a virus, but would compete anyway. Ranked second in the short program and sixth in the free skate, Radionova won the bronze medal in her world debut. She concluded her season at the 2015 World Team Trophy, placing third in the short program and second in the free skate. Both Radionova's and Tuktamysheva's efforts would aid Team Russia to earn a silver medal.

=== 2015–16 season ===
Radionova intended to begin her season at the 2015 Finlandia Trophy but withdrew due to health problems. Although she wasn’t fully recovered from a high fever and virus, she insisted on competing at her first Grand Prix event of the season, the 2015 Cup of China; she won the bronze medal behind Mao Asada and Rika Hongo. At the 2015 Rostelecom Cup, annually hosted in late November in Moscow, she won the gold ahead of former teammates Evgenia Medvedeva and Adelina Sotnikova. It was Russia's first sweep of a Grand Prix ladies' podium since the 1999 Cup of Russia. With this victory, Radionova was once the only competitor who had defeated Evgenia Medvedeva since her arrival in the senior level until Alina Zagitova in 2018.

Radionova qualified for the 2015–16 Grand Prix Final, held in December in Barcelona. She won the bronze medal in Spain, having ranked second in the short and fourth in the free skate after falling from her triple loop, a scratchy triple lutz and two footing her last toe loop combination. Later that month, she won the silver medal behind Medvedeva at the 2016 Russian Championships, having placed second in both segments.

On 27 to 30 January, Radionova competed at the 2016 European Championships in Bratislava, Slovakia. She repeated as the European silver medalist while her teammates completed the podium, with Medvedeva winning the gold and Anna Pogorilaya taking the bronze. In April, she finished sixth at the 2016 World Championships in Boston after placing fifth in both segments. Radionova was then invited to the 2016 Team Challenge Cup where she finished 7th in the short after singling her axel but moved up to 5th in the free. Team Europe eventually finished in second place with Radionova taking a Team silver medal and prize money.

=== 2016–17 season ===
Radionova's Grand Prix assignments for the 2016–17 season, her first event was at the 2016 Rostelecom Cup where she finished second in both the short and free skating, winning the silver medal overall behind teammate Anna Pogorilaya. Then in her next event at the 2016 Cup of China, Radionova finished second at the short program and won the free skating, winning the gold medal with a total of 205.90 points qualifying to her fourth consecutive Grand Prix Final, to be held in December in Marseille, France.

Radionova participated in the 2017 Winter Universiade in Almaty, Kazakhstan from 1 to 5 February. She finished first in both the short and the long programs, with a total of 196.61 points earning her the gold medal.

On 28 April 2017, it was reported that Radionova would train under Elena Buianova under the same club in CSKA. Her split with her former coach Goncharenko was amicable.

=== 2017–18 season ===
Radionova finished 4th at the 2017 Rostelecom Cup and took bronze at the 2017 Cup of China. She finished a disappointing 10th place at the 2018 Russian Figure Skating Championships.

=== 2018–19 season and onward ===
Radionova withdrew from the 2018 Skate America and 2018 NHK Trophy due to a back injury.

On 22 September 2020, she announced her retirement from competition.

== Records and achievements ==
- First ladies' skater in history to win two World Junior titles (2013 & 2014).
- Former world record holder for the junior ladies' short program (66.90 points), set at the 2014 World Junior Championships on 14 March 2014. The record was broken nine months later on 11 December 2014 by Evgenia Medvedeva (Russia).
- Former world record holder for the junior ladies' free program (127.39 points), set at the 2014 World Junior Championships on 14 March 2014. The record was broken on 12 December 2015 by Polina Tsurskaya (Russia).
- Former world record holder for the junior ladies' combined total score (194.29 points), set at the 2014 World Junior Championships on 14 March 2014. The record was broken on 12 December 2015 by Polina Tsurskaya (Russia).

=== List of Radionova's junior world record scores ===
Junior ladies' combined total records
Date	Score	Event	Note
16 March 2014	194.29	2014 World Junior Championships	Radionova became the first junior lady to score above 190 points. The record was broken by Polina Tsurskaya on 13 December 2015.
Junior ladies' short program records
Date	Score	Event	Note
15 March 2014	66.90	2014 World Junior Championships	The record was broken by Evgenia Medvedeva on 13 December 2014. Radionova broke Mirai Nagasu's junior record which had lasted since 1 March 2008.
Junior ladies' free skating records
Date	Score	Event	Note
16 March 2014	127.39	2014 World Junior Championships	The record was broken by Polina Tsurskaya on 13 December 2015.

== Endorsements ==
Radionova signed a sponsorship deal with American skating boots manufacturer Riedell Skates.

== Programs ==
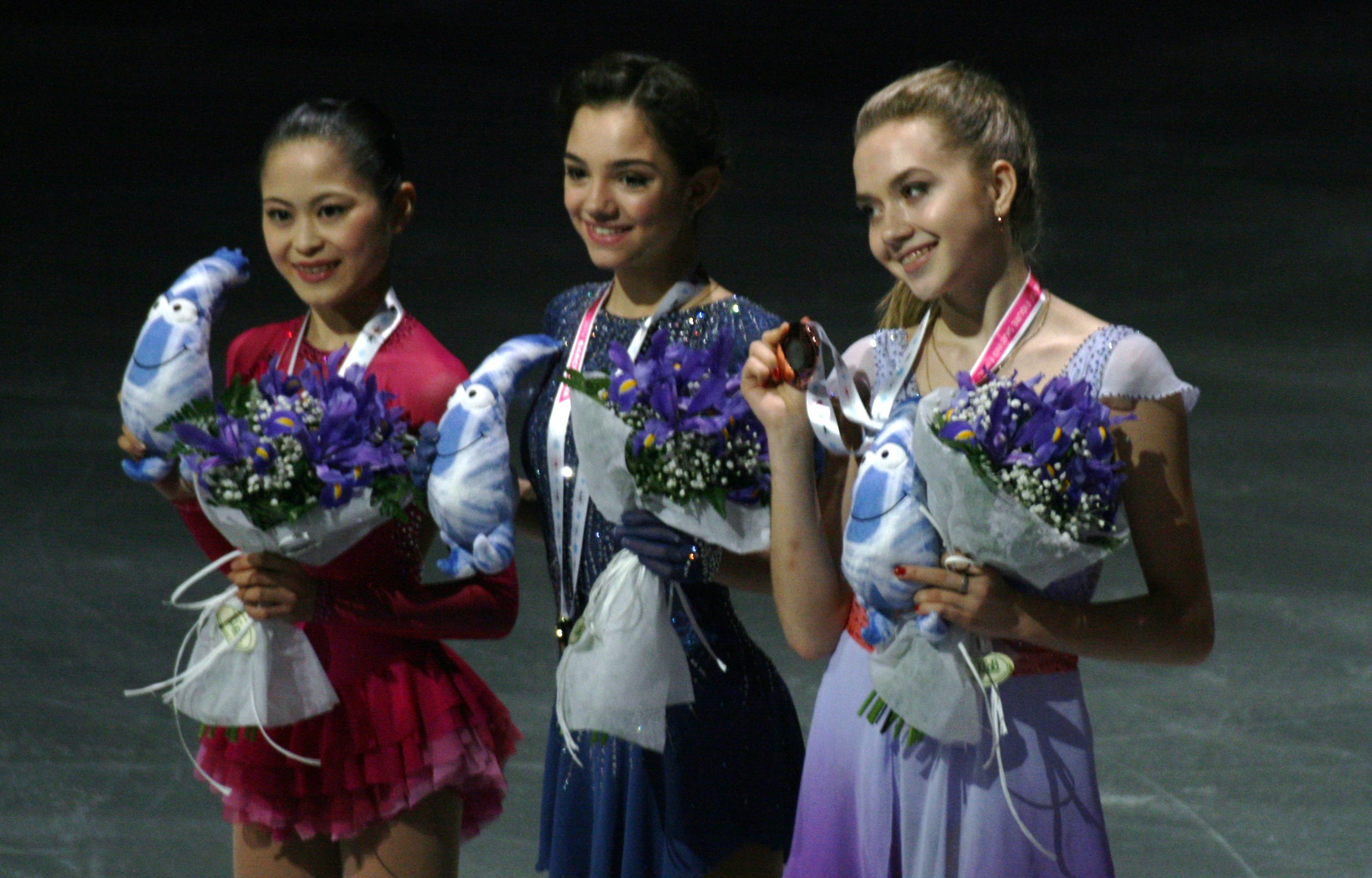
Radionova at the 2015–16 Grand Prix Final podium, winning bronze, next to gold medalist Evgenia Medvedeva

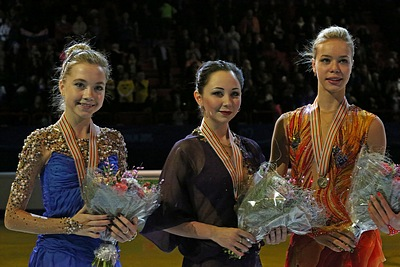
Radionova at the 2015 European Championships podium

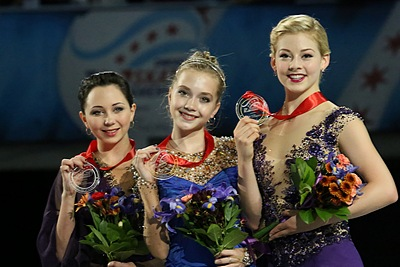
Radionova at the 2014 Skate America podium, in 1st place

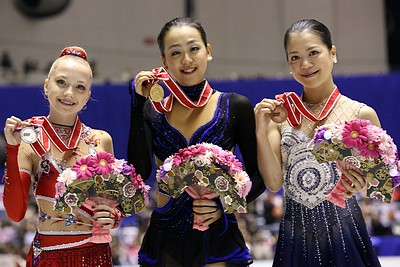
Radionova at the 2013 NHK Trophy podium, in 2nd place

Season	Short program	Free skating	Exhibition
2020-2021	Did not compete this season		It Doesn't Hurt performed by Katie Thompson
2019-2020	Did not compete this season		Alien performed live by Natalia Podolskaya; Carpe Omnis performed live by Aida Garifullina and Igor Krutoy; Sometimes performed live by Diana Makina; Mi Mancherai performed by Josh Groban; Blizzard again (Russian: Опять Метель) soundtrack to the film The Irony of Fate 2performed by Alla Pugacheva and Kristina Orbakaitė; It Doesn't Hurt performed by Katie Thompson
2018–2019	You Know I'm No Good by Amy Winehouse choreo. by Peter Tchernyshev	Cinema Paradiso (from Cinema Paradiso) by Ennio Morricone and Andrea Morricone choreo. by Peter Tchernyshev	Bonfire Heart by James Blunt; Sometimes; Tribute to Denis Ten; It Doesn't Hurt by Katie Thompson
2017–2018	It Ain't Necessarily So (from Porgy and Bess) by George Gershwin choreo. by Shae-Lynn Bourne	Historia de un Amor by Carlos Eleta Almarán choreo. by Shae-Lynn Bourne	It Doesn't Hurt by Katie Thompson
2016–2017	It Ain't Necessarily So (from Porgy and Bess) by George Gershwin choreo. by Shae-Lynn Bourne	Violin Fantasy on Puccini's Turandot by Vanessa-Mae; Nessun dorma performed by Sarah Brightman choreo. by Nadia Kanaeva	Imagine performed by Emeli Sandé; Crazy In Love performed by Beyoncé choreo. by Misha Ge
2015–2016	Je t'aime by Lara Fabian choreo. by Nikolai Morozov	My Heart Will Go On (from Titanic) by James Horner performed by Celine Dion choreo. by Nikolai Morozov	Imagine performed by Emeli Sandé; I Will Always Love You) by Whitney Houston; Worth It by Fifth Harmony feat. Kid Ink
2014–2015	De mi vera te fuistes (Seguiriyas) by Pepe Romero; Ain't It Funny by Jennifer Lopez choreo. by Ilia Averbukh, Elena Maslennikova	Piano Concerto No. 3; Trio Elegiaque No. 2 by Sergei Rachmaninoff choreo. by Ilia Averbukh, Elena Maslennikova	I Will Always Love You by Whitney Houston; Queen of the Night; I Will Always Love You by Whitney Houston; Amies-ennemies by Nâdiya
2013–2014	Nero by Two Steps from Hell choreo. by Ilia Averbukh, Elena Maslennikova	Spanish Swat; Frida (from Have You Met Miss Bates?) by Rope choreo. by Ilia Averbukh, Elena Maslennikova	Korobeiniki; Zombie Dance choreo. by Elena Maslennikova
2012–2013	Carmenita Lounging by Claude Challe; The Diva Dance (from The Fifth Element) performed by Inva Mula	And Finally I Love You (Russian: И всё-таки я люблю…) by Dmitry Malikov; Country of the Deaf by Alexei Aygi	Rolling in the Deep by Adele
2011–2012	Carmenita Lounging by Claude Challe; The Diva Dance (from The Fifth Element) performed by Inva Mula	Pulmón by Bajofondo; Sentimientos by Andres Linetzky, Ernesto Romeo	Nostalgia by Igor Butman
2010–2011	The Blue Kerchief (Russian: Синий платочек: Sinii Platochek) composed by Jerzy Petersburski performed by Jozsef Lendvay; Dorogoi dlinnoyu (Russian: Дорогой длинною) composed by Boris Fomin	Pulmón by Bajofondo; Sentimientos by Andres Linetzky, Ernesto Romeo	The Blue Kerchief composed by Jerzy Petersburski performed by Jozsef Lendvay; Dorogoi dlinnoyu composed by Boris Fomin
2009–2010	The Blue Kerchief (Russian: Синий платочек: Sinii Platochek) composed by Jerzy Petersburski performed by Jozsef Lendvay; Dorogoi dlinnoyu (Russian: Дорогой длинною) composed by Boris Fomin	Aliscia by Richard Clayderman	Candyman by Christina Aguilera
2008–2009	unknown	Aliscia by Richard Clayderman	Mein Herr from Cabaret by Liza Minnelli

== Competitive highlights ==
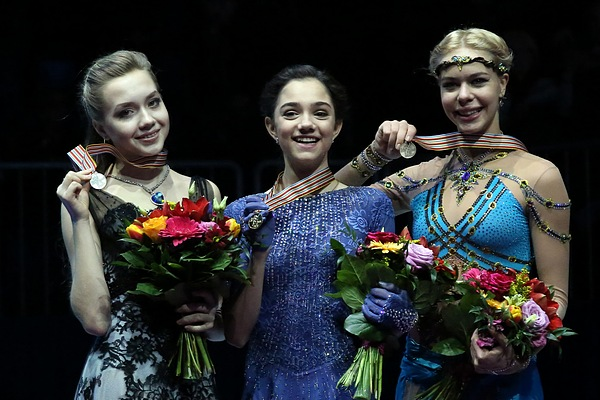
Radionova at the 2016 European Championships podium winning silver, next to former teammate and Olympian Evgenia Medvedeva

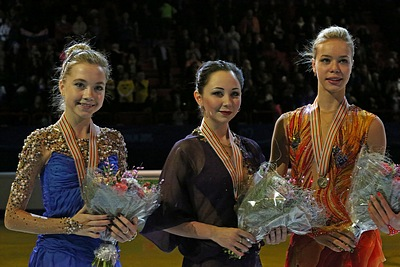
Radionova at the 2015 European Championships podium

GP: Grand Prix; CS: Challenger Series; JGP: Junior Grand Prix

International
Event	10–11	11–12	12–13	13–14	14–15	15–16	16–17	17–18	18–19
Worlds					3rd	6th			
Europeans					2nd	2nd			
GP Final				4th	2nd	3rd	6th		
GP Cup of China						3rd	1st	3rd	
GP France					1st				
GP NHK Trophy				2nd					WD
GP Rostelecom Cup						1st	2nd	4th	
GP Skate America				3rd	1st				WD
CS Ondrej Nepela								3rd	
Nebelhorn Trophy				1st					
Shanghai Trophy								1st	
Winter Universiade							1st		
International: Junior
Junior Worlds			1st	1st					
JGP Final			1st						
JGP Austria			1st						
JGP France			1st						
Triglav Trophy		1st N	1st J						
National
Russian Champ.		5th	2nd	3rd	1st	2nd	5th	10th	WD
Russian Junior Champ.	4th	3rd	1st						
Team events
World Team; Trophy					2nd T 2nd P		2nd T 5th P		
Team Challenge; Cup						2nd T 5th P			
Japan Open					1st T 1st P				
TBD = Assigned; WD = Withdrew; Levels: N = Novice; J = Junior; T = Team result; P = Personal result. Medals awarded for team result only.

== Detailed results ==
=== Senior level ===
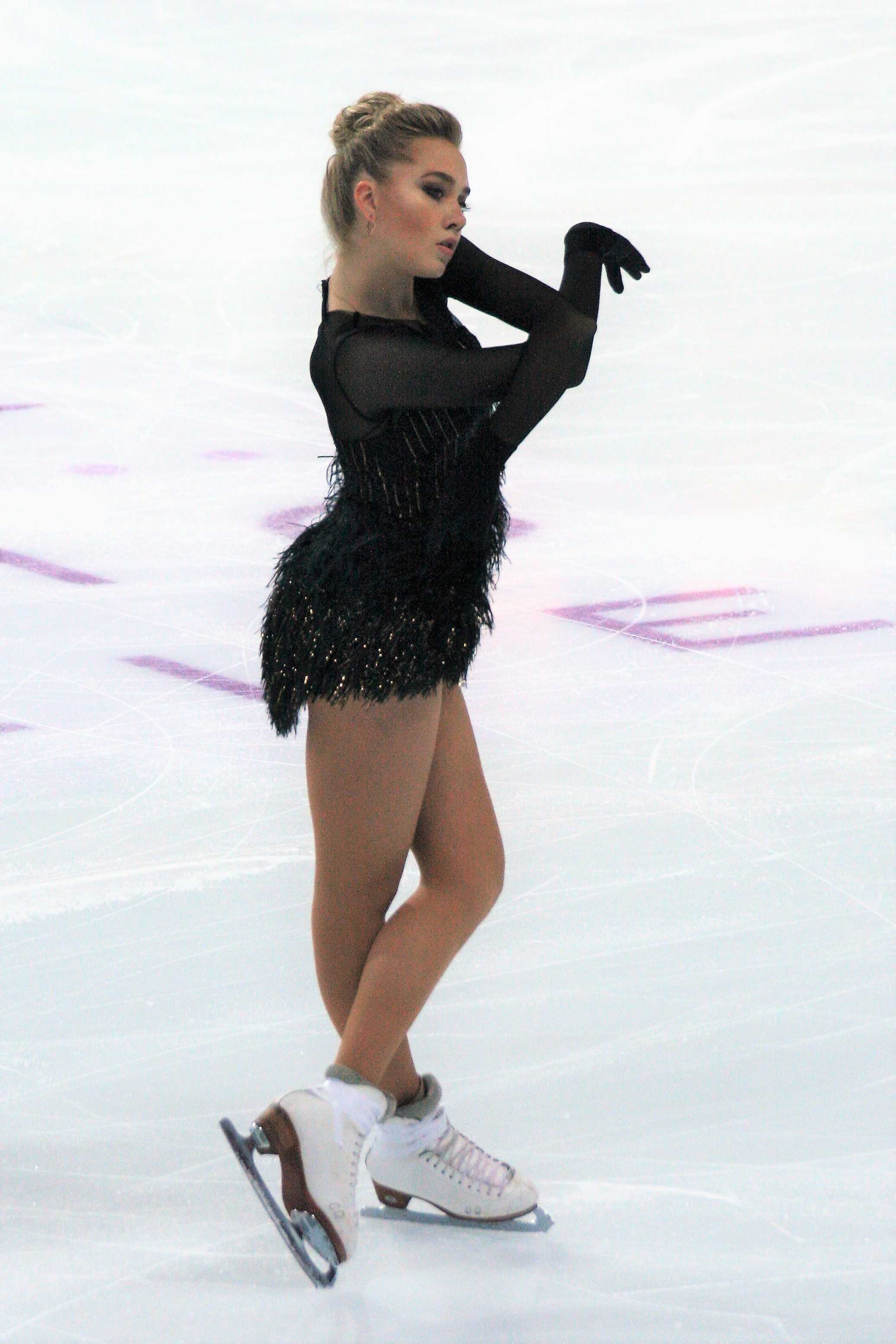
Radionova at the 2016–17 Grand Prix Final

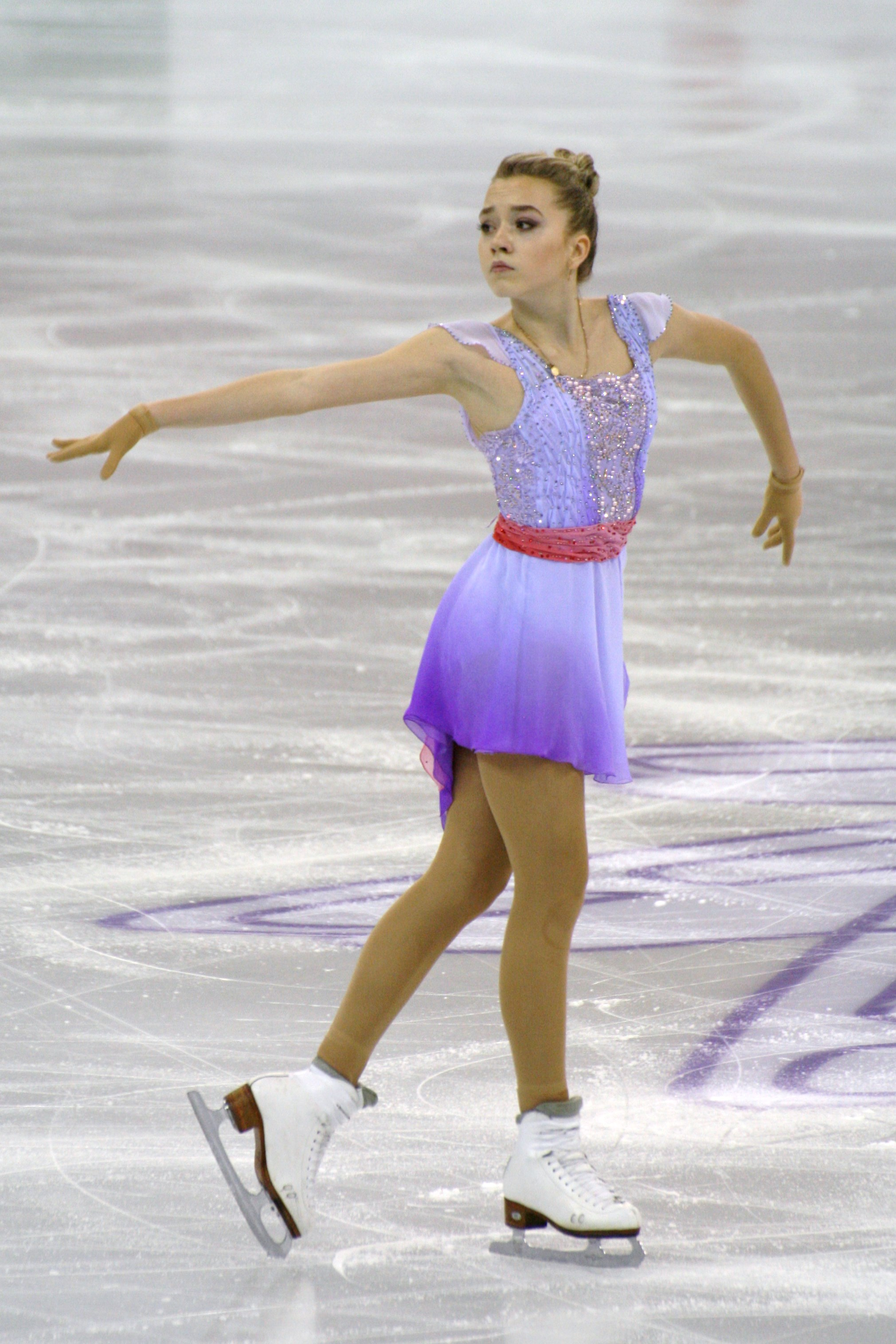
Radionova at the 2015–16 Grand Prix Final

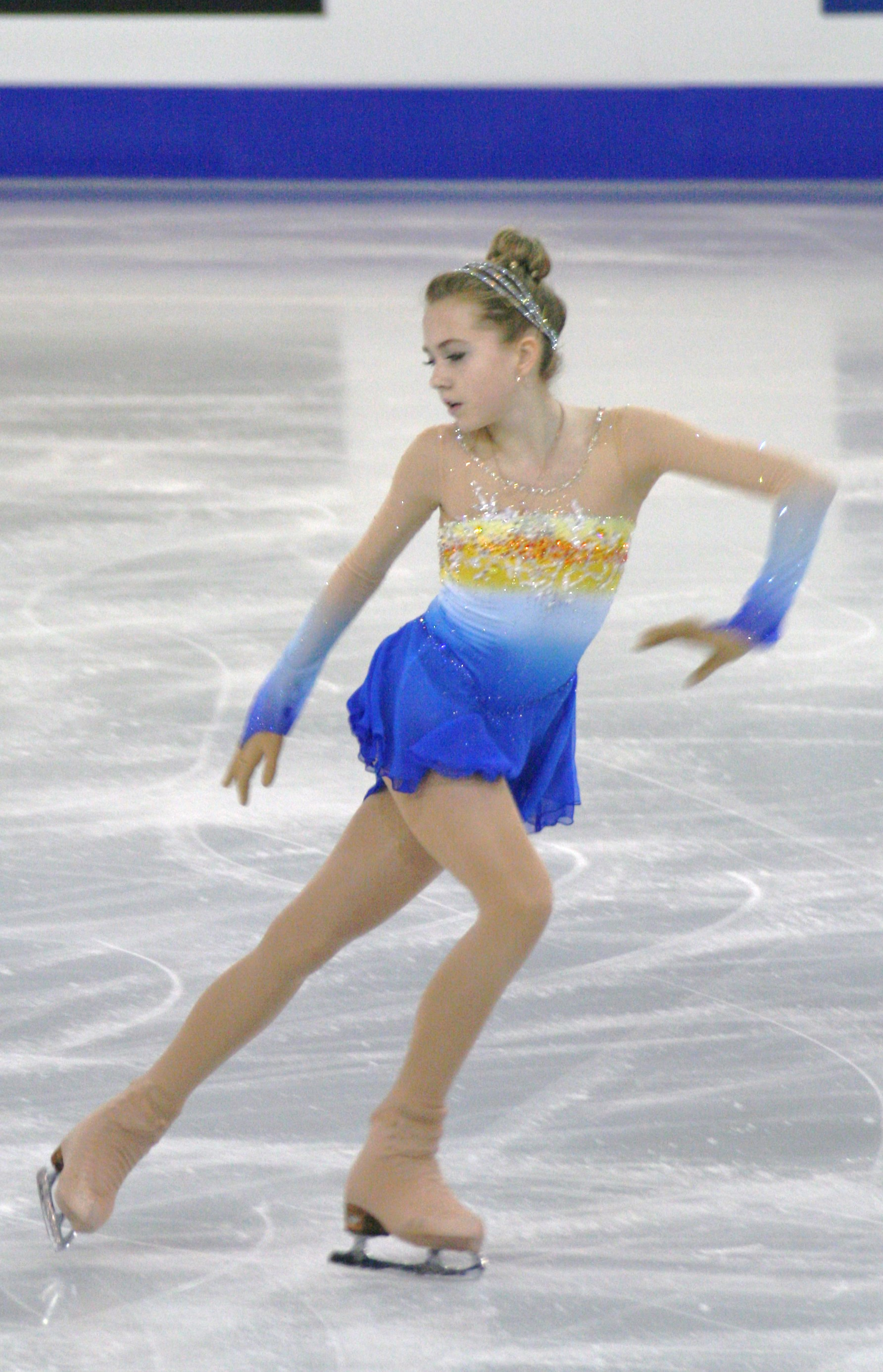
Radionova at the 2014–15 Grand Prix Final

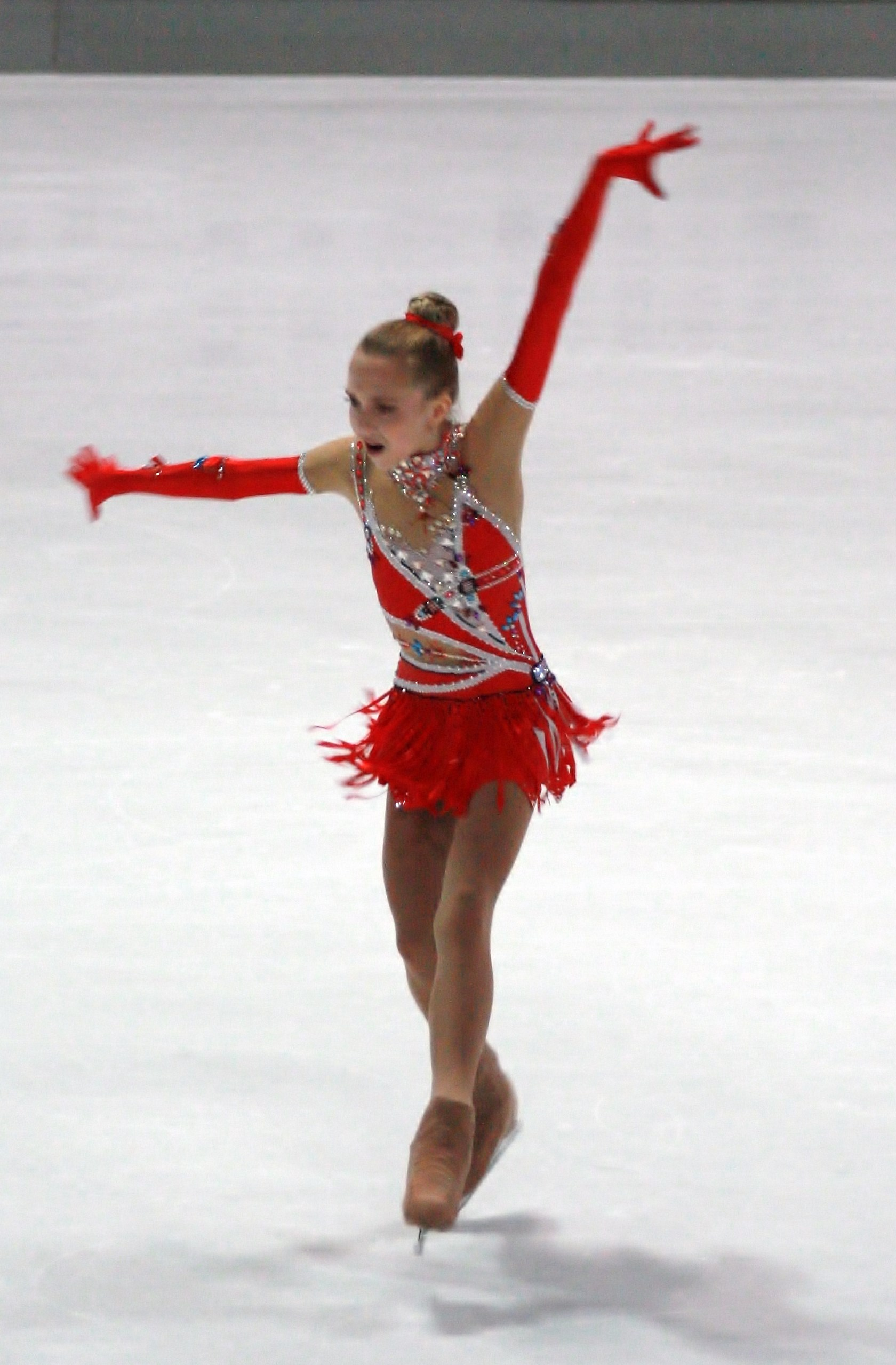
Radionova at the 2013 Nebelhorn Trophy

Small medals for short and free programs awarded only at ISU Championships. At team events, medals awarded for team results only.

**2017–18 season**
Date	Event	SP	FS	Total
21–24 December 2017	2018 Russian Championships	13; 66.16	9; 130.62	10; 196.78
24–26 November 2017	2017 Shanghai Trophy	–	1; 131.06	1; 131.06
3–5 November 2017	2017 Cup of China	3; 70.48	4; 136.34	3; 206.82
20–22 October 2017	2017 Rostelecom Cup	5; 68.75	4; 126.77	4; 195.52
21–23 September 2017	2017 CS Ondrej Nepela Trophy	3; 64.42	4; 117.79	3; 182.21
2016–17 season
Date	Event	SP	FS	Total
20–23 April 2017	2017 World Team Trophy	2; **72.21**	5; 137.08	2T/5P; 209.29
1–5 February 2017	2017 Winter Universiade	1; 69.02	1; 127.59	1; 196.61
20–26 December 2016	2017 Russian Championships	5; 70.19	5; 139.05	5; 209.24
8–11 December 2016	2016–17 Grand Prix Final	5; 68.98	6; 119.83	6; 188.81
18–20 November 2016	2016 Cup of China	2; 70.75	1; 135.15	1; 205.90
4–6 November 2016	2016 Rostelecom Cup	2; 71.93	2; 123.67	2; 195.60
2015–16 season
Date	Event	SP	FS	Total
22–24 April 2016	2016 Team Challenge Cup	7; 61.36	5; 133.31	2^{T}
28 March – 3 April 2016	2016 World Championships	5; 71.70	5; 138.11	6; 209.81
26–31 January 2016	2016 European Championships	2; 70.96	2; 139.03	2; 209.99
24–27 December 2015	2016 Russian Championships	2; 76.69	2; 145.88	2; 222.57
10–13 December 2015	2015–16 Grand Prix Final	2; 69.43	4; 131.70	3; 201.13
20–22 November 2015	2015 Rostelecom Cup	1; 71.79	2; **139.53**	1; **211.32**
6–8 November 2015	2015 Cup of China	6; 58.51	2; 125.77	3; 184.28
2014–15 season
Date	Event	SP	FS	Total
15–19 April 2015	2015 World Team Trophy	3; 68.77	2; 129.73	2; 198.50
23–29 March 2015	2015 World Championships	2; 69.51	6; 121.96	3; 191.47
26 Jan. – 1 Feb. 2015	2015 European Championships	1; 70.46	2; 139.08	2; 209.54
24–28 December 2014	2015 Russian Championships	1; 74.13	1; 143.32	1; 217.45
11–14 December 2014	2014–15 Grand Prix Final	3; 63.89	2; 134.85	2; 198.74
21–23 November 2014	2014 Trophée Éric Bompard	1; 67.28	1; 136.64	1; 203.92
24–26 October 2014	2014 Skate America	2; 65.57	1; 129.90	1; 195.47
2–4 October 2014	2014 Japan Open	–	1; 136.46	1
2013–14 season
Date	Event	SP	FS	Total
25–26 December 2013	2014 Russian Championships	3; 67.76	3; 134.25	3; 202.01
5–8 December 2013	2013–14 Grand Prix Final	5; 64.38	4; 118.64	4; 183.02
8–10 November 2013	2013 NHK Trophy	3; 62.83	2; 128.98	2; 191.81
19–20 October 2013	2013 Skate America	3; 67.01	4; 116.94	3; 183.95
26–28 September 2013	2013 Nebelhorn Trophy	1; 64.69	1; 123.52	1; 188.21

=== Junior level ===
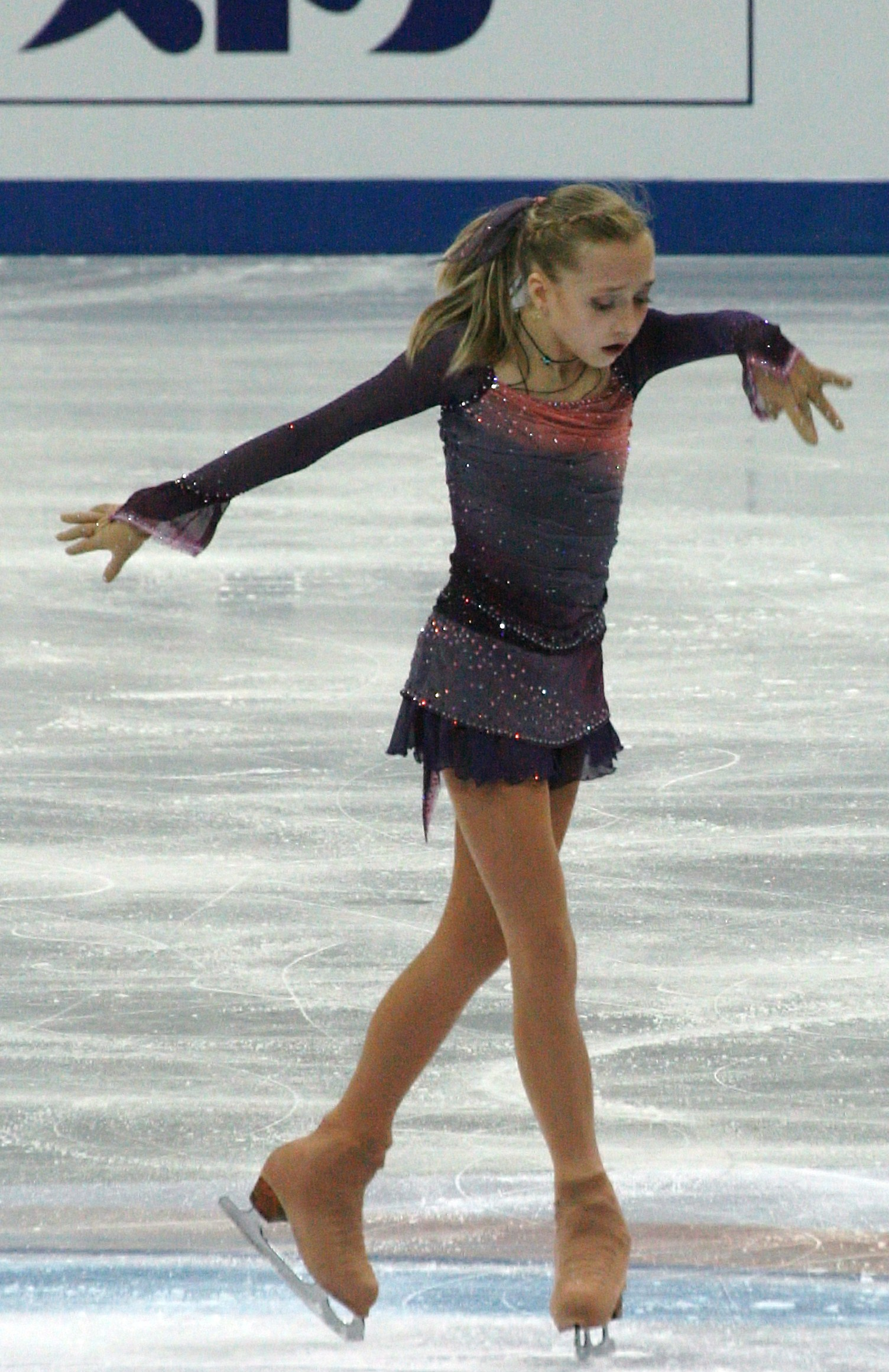
Radionova at the 2012–13 Junior Grand Prix Final

Small medals for short and free programs awarded only at ISU Championships. Previous ISU world best highlighted in bold.

2013–14 season
Date	Event	Level	SP	FS	Total
10–16 March 2014	2014 World Junior Championships	Junior	1; **66.90**	1; **127.39**	1; **194.29**
2012–13 season
Date	Event	Level	SP	FS	Total
29–31 March 2013	2013 Triglav Trophy	Junior	1; 62.34	1; 110.43	1; 172.77
1–2 March 2013	2013 World Junior Championships	Junior	5; 53.48	1; 116.23	1; 169.71
2–3 February 2013	2013 Russian Junior Championships	Junior	1; 68.45	1; 131.74	1; 200.19
25–28 December 2012	2013 Russian Championships	Senior	3; 64.58	2; 126.68	2; 191.26
6–9 December 2012	2012–13 Junior Grand Prix Final	Junior	1; 60.90	1; 118.50	1; 179.40
13–15 September 2012	2012 JGP Austria	Junior	1; 62.71	1; 120.15	1; 182.86
23–24 August 2012	2012 JGP France	Junior	1; 61.15	1; 116.64	1; 177.79
2011–12 season
Date	Event	Level	SP	FS	Total
5–7 April 2012	2012 Triglav Trophy	Novice	1; 47.27	1; 88.91	1; 136.18
5–7 February 2012	2012 Russian Junior Championships	Junior	4; 57.19	2; 121.75	3; 178.94
26–27 December 2011	2012 Russian Championships	Senior	6; 59.10	6; 115.71	5; 174.81
2010–11 season
Date	Event	Level	SP	FS	Total
2–4 February 2011	2011 Russian Junior Championships	Junior	5; 54.75	4; 104.22	4; 158.97
24–25 April 2010	Rostelecom Crystal Skate	Novice	1; 49.08	1; 90.54	1; 139.62

Historical World Junior Record Holders (before season 2018–19)
Preceded by (United States) Mirai Nagasu	Ladies' Junior Short Program; 15 March 2014 – 13 December 2014	Succeeded by (Russia) Evgenia Medvedeva
Preceded by (Russia) Yulia Lipnitskaya	Ladies' Junior Free Skating; 16 March 2014 – 13 December 2015	Succeeded by (Russia) Polina Tsurskaya
Preceded by (Russia) Yulia Lipnitskaya	Ladies' Junior Total Score; 16 March 2014 – 13 December 2015	Succeeded by (Russia) Polina Tsurskaya
