= 2013 NHK Trophy =

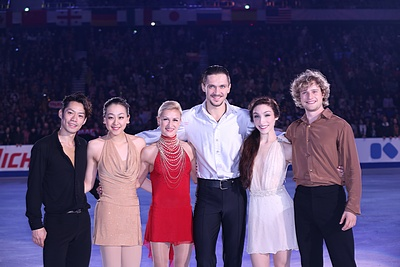
- Type: Grand Prix
- Date: November 8 – 10
- Season: 2013–14
- Location: Tokyo
- Host: Japan Skating Federation
- Venue: Yoyogi National Gymnasium

Champions
- Men's singles: (Japan) Daisuke Takahashi
- Ladies' singles: (Japan) Mao Asada
- Pairs: (Russia) Tatiana Volosozhar / Maxim Trankov
- Ice dance: (United States) Meryl Davis / Charlie White
- Previous: 2012 NHK Trophy
- Next: 2014 NHK Trophy
- Previous Grand Prix: 2013 Cup of China
- Next Grand Prix: 2013 Trophée Éric Bompard

The 2013 NHK Trophy was the fourth event of six in the 2013–14 ISU Grand Prix of Figure Skating, a senior-level international invitational competition series. It was held at the Yoyogi National Gymnasium in Tokyo on November 8–10. Medals were awarded in the disciplines of men's singles, ladies' singles, pair skating, and ice dancing. Skaters earned points toward qualifying for the 2013–14 Grand Prix Final.

== Eligibility ==
Skaters who reached the age of 14 by July 1, 2013 were eligible to compete on the senior Grand Prix circuit.

== Entries ==
The entries were as follows.

Country	Men	Ladies	Pairs	Ice dancing
Canada			Paige Lawrence / Rudi Swiegers	Piper Gilles / Paul Poirier
China			Peng Cheng / Zhang Hao; Sui Wenjing / Han Cong	
Germany				Tanja Kolbe / Stefano Caruso
Georgia		Elene Gedevanishvili		
Italy		Valentina Marchei		Anna Cappellini / Luca Lanotte
Japan	Takahito Mura; Nobunari Oda; Daisuke Takahashi	Mao Asada; Akiko Suzuki; Satoko Miyahara	Narumi Takahashi / Ryuichi Kihara	Cathy Reed / Chris Reed
Russia	Konstantin Menshov; Sergei Voronov	Alena Leonova; Elena Radionova	Tatiana Volosozhar / Maxim Trankov; Anastasia Martiusheva / Alexei Rogonov	Elena Ilinykh / Nikita Katsalapov; Victoria Sinitsina / Ruslan Zhiganshin
Spain	Javier Fernández			
United States	Max Aaron; Jeremy Abbott; Adam Rippon	Gracie Gold; Mirai Nagasu	Marissa Castelli / Simon Shnapir; Haven Denney / Brandon Frazier	Meryl Davis / Charlie White; Maia Shibutani / Alex Shibutani

=== Changes to initial lineup ===
In the pairs' event, Yuko Kavaguti / Alexander Smirnov withdrew due to an injury to Smirnov. Anastasia Martiusheva / Alexei Rogonov were named as their replacements. In the ladies event, Li Zijun withdrew and was not replaced. In the men's event, Chafik Besseghier withdrew and was not replaced.

== Results ==
=== Men ===
Rank	Name	Nation	Total points	SP		FS	
1	Daisuke Takahashi	Japan	268.31	1	95.55	1	172.76
2	Nobunari Oda	Japan	253.16	3	82.70	2	170.46
3	Jeremy Abbott	United States	237.41	7	78.78	3	158.63
4	Adam Rippon	United States	233.71	4	82.25	4	151.46
5	Javier Fernández	Spain	230.45	2	84.78	8	145.67
6	Takahito Mura	Japan	227.22	5	79.97	6	147.25
7	Max Aaron	United States	223.35	8	76.21	7	147.14
8	Konstantin Menshov	Russia	221.32	9	73.57	5	147.75
9	Sergei Voronov	Russia	221.18	6	79.80	9	141.38

=== Ladies ===
Rank	Name	Nation	Total points	SP		FS	
1	Mao Asada	Japan	207.59	1	71.26	1	136.33
2	Elena Radionova	Russia	191.81	3	62.83	2	128.98
3	Akiko Suzuki	Japan	179.32	2	66.03	4	113.29
4	Gracie Gold	United States	177.81	4	62.83	3	114.98
5	Satoko Miyahara	Japan	170.21	6	58.39	5	111.82
6	Valentina Marchei	Italy	168.95	5	61.90	6	107.05
7	Alena Leonova	Russia	161.94	7	55.86	7	106.08
8	Mirai Nagasu	United States	141.71	8	51.01	8	90.70
9	Elene Gedevanishvili	Georgia	129.24	9	45.14	9	84.10

=== Pairs ===
Rank	Name	Nation	Total points	SP		FS	
1	Tatiana Volosozhar / Maxim Trankov	Russia	236.49	1	82.03	1	154.46
2	Peng Cheng / Zhang Hao	China	182.18	3	65.09	2	117.09
3	Sui Wenjing / Han Cong	China	171.32	2	70.13	5	101.19
4	Marissa Castelli / Simon Shnapir	United States	168.89	5	58.60	3	110.29
5	Haven Denney / Brandon Frazier	United States	167.85	4	58.67	4	109.18
6	Paige Lawrence / Rudi Swiegers	Canada	153.55	6	52.78	6	100.77
7	Anastasia Martiusheva / Alexei Rogonov	Russia	145.37	8	48.97	7	96.40
8	Narumi Takahashi / Ryuichi Kihara	Japan	136.13	7	49.54	8	86.59

=== Ice dancing ===
Rank	Name	Nation	Total points	SD		FD	
1	Meryl Davis / Charlie White	United States	186.65	1	73.70	1	112.95
2	Anna Cappellini / Luca Lanotte	Italy	160.06	2	64.58	2	95.48
3	Maia Shibutani / Alex Shibutani	United States	157.58	3	63.09	3	94.49
4	Elena Ilinykh / Nikita Katsalapov	Russia	155.37	4	61.35	4	94.02
5	Piper Gilles / Paul Poirier	Canada	144.07	5	55.20	5	88.87
6	Cathy Reed / Chris Reed	Japan	133.76	7	51.91	6	81.85
7	Tanja Kolbe / Stefano Caruso	Germany	130.51	6	52.39	8	78.12
8	Victoria Sinitsina / Ruslan Zhiganshin	Russia	124.23	8	44.34	7	79.89
