= 2013–14 Grand Prix of Figure Skating Final =

Figure skating event

2013–14 Grand Prix Final
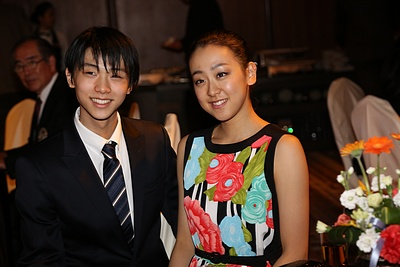
- Hanyu and Asada at the 2013 Grand Prix Final.
- Type: Grand Prix
- Date: December 5 – 8, 2013
- Season: 2013–14
- Location: Fukuoka, Japan
- Host: Japan Skating Federation
- Venue: Marine Messe

Champions
- Men's singles: (Japan) Yuzuru Hanyu (S) (China) Jin Boyang (J)
- Ladies' singles: (Japan) Mao Asada (S) (Russia) Maria Sotskova (J)
- Pairs: (Germany) Aliona Savchenko / Robin Szolkowy (S) (China) Yu Xiaoyu / Jin Yang (J)
- Ice dance: (United States) Meryl Davis / Charlie White (S) (Russia) Anna Yanovskaya / Sergey Mozgov (J)
- Previous: 2012–13 Grand Prix Final
- Next: 2014–15 Grand Prix Final
- Previous Grand Prix: 2013 Rostelecom Cup

The 2013–14 Grand Prix of Figure Skating Final was an international figure skating competition in the 2013–14 season, held together with the ISU Junior Grand Prix Final. The combined event was the culmination of two international series — the Grand Prix of Figure Skating and the Junior Grand Prix.

The competition was held in Fukuoka, Japan from 5 to 8 December 2013, with medals awarded in the disciplines of men's singles, ladies' singles, pair skating, and ice dancing on the senior and junior levels.

== Medalists ==
=== Senior ===
Discipline	Gold	Silver	Bronze
Men	(Japan) Yuzuru Hanyu	(Canada) Patrick Chan	(Japan) Nobunari Oda
Ladies	(Japan) Mao Asada	(Russia) Yulia Lipnitskaya	(United States) Ashley Wagner
Pairs	(Germany) Aliona Savchenko / Robin Szolkowy	(Russia) Tatiana Volosozhar / Maxim Trankov	(China) Pang Qing / Tong Jian
Ice dancing	(United States) Meryl Davis / Charlie White	(Canada) Tessa Virtue / Scott Moir	(France) Nathalie Péchalat / Fabian Bourzat

=== Junior ===
Discipline	Gold	Silver	Bronze
Men	(China) Jin Boyang	(Russia) Adian Pitkeev	(United States) Nathan Chen
Ladies	(Russia) Maria Sotskova	(Russia) Serafima Sakhanovich	(Russia) Evgenia Medvedeva
Pairs	(China) Yu Xiaoyu / Jin Yang	(Russia) Maria Vigalova / Egor Zakroev	(Russia) Lina Fedorova / Maxim Miroshkin
Ice dancing	(Russia) Anna Yanovskaya / Sergey Mozgov	(United States) Kaitlin Hawayek / Jean-Luc Baker	(United States) Lorraine McNamara / Quinn Carpenter

== Medals table ==
=== Senior ===
Rank	Nation	Gold	Silver	Bronze	Total
1	Japan (JPN)	2	0	1	3
2	United States (USA)	1	0	1	2
3	Germany (GER)	1	0	0	1
4	Canada (CAN)	0	2	0	2
4	Russia (RUS)	0	2	0	2
6	China (CHN)	0	0	1	1
6	France (FRA)	0	0	1	1
Totals (7 entries)		4	4	4	12

=== Junior ===
Rank	Nation	Gold	Silver	Bronze	Total
1	Russia (RUS)	2	3	2	7
2	China (CHN)	2	0	0	2
3	United States (USA)	0	1	2	3
Totals (3 entries)		4	4	4	12

== Qualifiers ==
=== Senior-level qualifiers ===
Skaters who reached the age of 14 by 1 July 2013 were eligible to compete at two senior 2013–14 Grand Prix events – including the 2013 Skate America, 2013 Skate Canada International, 2013 Cup of China, 2013 NHK Trophy, 2013 Trophée Éric Bompard, and 2013 Rostelecom Cup – where they earned points according to their results. The six highest ranking skaters in each discipline qualified for the senior Grand Prix Final.

	Men	Ladies	Pairs	Ice dancing
1	(Canada) Patrick Chan	(Japan) Mao Asada	(Russia) Tatiana Volosozhar / Maxim Trankov	(United States) Meryl Davis / Charlie White
2	(Japan) Tatsuki Machida	(Russia) Yulia Lipnitskaya	(Germany) Aliona Savchenko / Robin Szolkowy	(Canada) Tessa Virtue / Scott Moir
3	(Japan) Yuzuru Hanyu	(United States) Ashley Wagner	(China) Pang Qing / Tong Jian	(Russia) Ekaterina Bobrova / Dmitri Soloviev
4	(Russia) Maxim Kovtun	(Russia) Anna Pogorilaya	(Canada) Kirsten Moore-Towers / Dylan Moscovitch	(France) Nathalie Péchalat / Fabian Bourzat
5	(Japan) ~~Daisuke Takahashi~~ (withdrew)	(Russia) Adelina Sotnikova	(Canada) Meagan Duhamel / Eric Radford	(Canada) Kaitlyn Weaver / Andrew Poje
6	(China) Yan Han	(Russia) Elena Radionova	(China) Peng Cheng / Zhang Hao	(Italy) Anna Cappellini / Luca Lanotte
Alternates
1st	(Japan) Nobunari Oda (called up)	(Japan) Akiko Suzuki	(China) Sui Wenjing / Han Cong	(Russia) Elena Ilinykh / Nikita Katsalapov
2nd	(United States) Adam Rippon	(Italy) Carolina Kostner	(Italy) Stefania Berton / Ondrej Hotarek	(United States) Maia Shibutani / Alex Shibutani
3rd	(United States) Jason Brown	(United States) Gracie Gold	(Russia) Vera Bazarova / Yuri Larionov	(United States) Madison Chock / Evan Bates

Changes to initial lineup: Daisuke Takahashi withdrew due to a leg injury. He was replaced by countryman Nobunari Oda.

=== Junior-level qualifiers ===
Skaters who reached the age of 13 by 1 July 2013 but had not turned 19 (singles and females of the other two disciplines) or 21 (male pair skaters and ice dancers) were eligible to compete at two 2013–14 ISU Junior Grand Prix events, earning points according to their results. The six highest-ranking skaters in each discipline qualified for the JGP Final.

	Men	Ladies	Pairs	Ice dancing
1	(United States) Nathan Chen	(Russia) Evgenia Medvedeva	(China) Yu Xiaoyu / Jin Yang	(Russia) Anna Yanovskaya / Sergey Mozgov
2	(Japan) Keiji Tanaka	(United States) Polina Edmunds	(Russia) Lina Fedorova / Maxim Miroshkin	(United States) Kaitlin Hawayek / Jean-Luc Baker
3	(China) Jin Boyang	(Russia) Alexandra Proklova	(Russia) Maria Vigalova / Egor Zakroev	(United States) Lorraine McNamara / Quinn Carpenter
4	(Russia) Adian Pitkeev	(United States) ~~Karen Chen~~ (withdrew)	(Russia) Kamilla Gainetdinova / Ivan Bich	(Russia) Betina Popova / Yuri Vlasenko
5	(Russia) Alexander Petrov	(Russia) Maria Sotskova	(Russia) Vasilisa Davankova / Andrei Deputat	(Ukraine) Oleksandra Nazarova / Maxim Nikitin
6	(Japan) Ryuju Hino	(Russia) Serafima Sakhanovich	(Russia) Evgenia Tarasova / Vladimir Morozov	(United States) Rachel Parsons / Michael Parsons
Alternates
1st	(Russia) Mikhail Kolyada	(United States) Angela Wang (called up)	(United States) Madeline Aaron / Max Settlage	(Canada) Madeline Edwards / Zhao Kai Pang
2nd	(China) Zhang He	(Kazakhstan) Elizabet Tursynbayeva	(Russia) Arina Cherniavskaia / Antonio Souza-Kordeyru	(Russia) Alla Loboda / Pavel Drozd
3rd	(Japan) Shoma Uno	(Japan) Riona Kato	(Russia) Oksana Nagalati / Maxim Bobrov	(Russia) Daria Morozova / Mikhail Zhirnov

Changes to initial lineup: Karen Chen withdrew due to an ankle injury and was replaced by fellow American Angela Wang.

== Senior-level results ==
=== Men ===
Yuzuru Hanyu set a new world record for the short program (99.84).

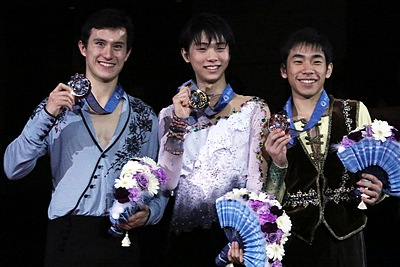
The men's medalists

Rank	Name	Nation	Total points	SP		FS	
1	Yuzuru Hanyu	Japan	293.25	1	99.84	1	193.41
2	Patrick Chan	Canada	280.08	2	87.47	2	192.61
3	Nobunari Oda	Japan	255.96	3	80.94	3	175.02
4	Tatsuki Machida	Japan	236.03	6	65.66	4	170.37
5	Maxim Kovtun	Russia	233.24	5	68.92	5	164.32
6	Yan Han	China	232.55	4	77.75	6	154.80

=== Ladies ===
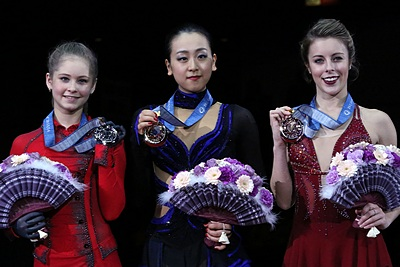
The ladies' medalists

Rank	Name	Nation	Total points	SP		FS	
1	Mao Asada	Japan	204.02	1	72.36	1	131.66
2	Yulia Lipnitskaya	Russia	192.07	4	66.62	2	125.45
3	Ashley Wagner	United States	187.61	3	68.14	3	119.47
4	Elena Radionova	Russia	183.02	5	64.38	4	118.64
5	Adelina Sotnikova	Russia	173.30	2	68.38	6	104.92
6	Anna Pogorilaya	Russia	171.88	6	59.81	5	112.07

=== Pairs ===
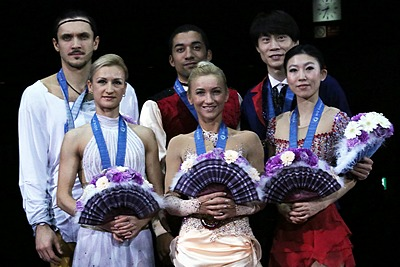
The pairs' medalists

Rank	Name	Nation	Total points	SP		FS	
1	Aliona Savchenko / Robin Szolkowy	Germany	227.03	2	79.46	1	147.57
2	Tatiana Volosozhar / Maxim Trankov	Russia	223.83	1	82.65	2	141.18
3	Pang Qing / Tong Jian	China	213.98	3	75.40	3	138.58
4	Peng Cheng / Zhang Hao	China	197.37	5	68.87	4	128.50
5	Meagan Duhamel / Eric Radford	Canada	193.38	4	73.07	6	120.31
6	Kirsten Moore-Towers / Dylan Moscovitch	Canada	189.11	6	68.77	5	120.34

=== Ice dancing ===
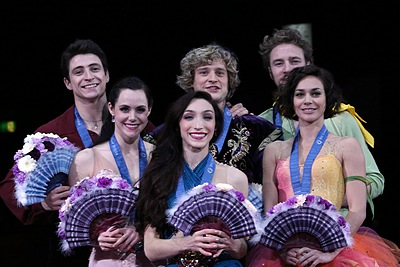
The ice dancing medalists

Rank	Name	Nation	Total points	SD		FD	
1	Meryl Davis / Charlie White	United States	191.35	1	77.66	1	113.69
2	Tessa Virtue / Scott Moir	Canada	190.00	2	77.59	2	112.41
3	Nathalie Péchalat / Fabian Bourzat	France	169.11	5	66.63	3	102.48
4	Ekaterina Bobrova / Dmitri Soloviev	Russia	166.72	3	68.90	4	97.82
5	Kaitlyn Weaver / Andrew Poje	Canada	165.04	4	67.68	5	97.36
6	Anna Cappellini / Luca Lanotte	Italy	156.58	6	61.57	6	95.01

== Junior-level results ==
=== Junior men ===
Rank	Name	Nation	Total points	SP		FS	
1	Jin Boyang	China	218.73	5	68.42	1	150.31
2	Adian Pitkeev	Russia	216.24	2	72.24	2	144.00
3	Nathan Chen	United States	214.61	3	71.52	3	143.09
4	Keiji Tanaka	Japan	205.71	1	73.63	4	132.08
5	Alexander Petrov	Russia	198.63	4	70.92	5	127.71
6	Ryuju Hino	Japan	182.39	6	58.56	6	123.83

=== Junior ladies ===
Rank	Name	Nation	Total points	SP		FS	
1	Maria Sotskova	Russia	176.75	1	61.29	1	115.46
2	Serafima Sakhanovich	Russia	172.86	2	60.56	3	112.30
3	Evgenia Medvedeva	Russia	163.68	3	58.75	5	104.93
4	Polina Edmunds	United States	161.71	5	48.20	2	113.51
5	Alexandra Proklova	Russia	157.77	4	51.27	4	106.50
6	Angela Wang	United States	131.58	6	44.69	6	86.89

=== Junior pairs ===
Rank	Name	Nation	Total points	SP		FS	
1	Yu Xiaoyu / Jin Yang	China	163.52	1	61.10	2	102.42
2	Maria Vigalova / Egor Zakroev	Russia	161.57	3	55.07	1	106.50
3	Lina Fedorova / Maxim Miroshkin	Russia	156.55	2	58.58	3	97.97
4	Evgenia Tarasova / Vladimir Morozov	Russia	152.01	4	54.91	4	97.10
5	Vasilisa Davankova / Andrei Deputat	Russia	151.02	5	54.82	5	96.20
6	Kamilla Gainetdinova / Ivan Bich	Russia	140.65	6	48.40	6	92.25

=== Junior ice dancing ===
Rank	Name	Nation	Total points	SD		FD	
1	Anna Yanovskaya / Sergey Mozgov	Russia	152.48	1	63.71	1	88.77
2	Kaitlin Hawayek / Jean-Luc Baker	United States	139.42	2	58.05	2	81.37
3	Lorraine McNamara / Quinn Carpenter	United States	135.89	3	55.14	3	80.75
4	Betina Popova / Yuri Vlasenko	Russia	129.47	4	52.50	4	76.97
5	Oleksandra Nazarova / Maxim Nikitin	Ukraine	123.17	5	51.32	5	71.85
6	Rachel Parsons / Michael Parsons	United States	116.60	6	46.11	6	70.49
