= Tatiana Volosozhar =

Ukrainian-born Russian pair skater (born 1986)

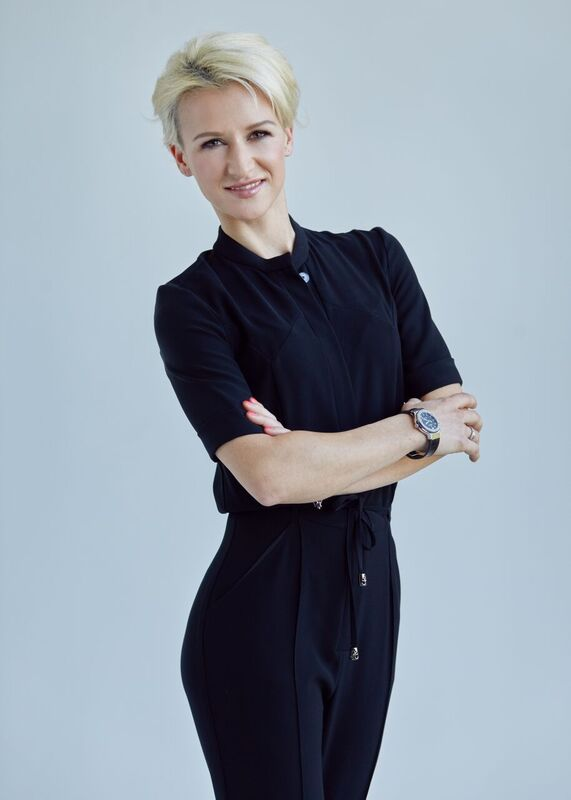

Personal information
- Full name: Tatiana Andreyеvna Volosozhar
- Born: 22 May 1986 (age 40) Dnipropetrovsk, Ukrainian SSR, Soviet Union
- Height: 1.60 m (5 ft 3 in)

Figure skating career
- Country: Russia (since 2011); Ukraine (2003–10)
- Partner: Maxim Trankov
- Coach: Nina Mozer, Stanislav Morozov
- Skating club: Vorobyovy Gory
- Began skating: 1991
Medal record
Representing Russia
Pairs' Figure skating
Olympic Games
Gold medal – first place	2014 Sochi	Pairs
Gold medal – first place	2014 Sochi	Team
World Championships
Gold medal – first place	2013 London	Pairs
Silver medal – second place	2011 Moscow	Pairs
Silver medal – second place	2012 Nice	Pairs
European Championships
Gold medal – first place	2012 Sheffield	Pairs
Gold medal – first place	2013 Zagreb	Pairs
Gold medal – first place	2014 Budapest	Pairs
Gold medal – first place	2016 Bratislava	Pairs
Grand Prix Final
Gold medal – first place	2012–2013 Sochi	Pairs
Silver medal – second place	2011–2012 Quebec	Pairs
Silver medal – second place	2013–2014 Fukuoka	Pairs
Russian Championships
Gold medal – first place	2011 Saransk	Pairs
Gold medal – first place	2013 Sochi	Pairs
Gold medal – first place	2016 Yekaterinburg	Pairs
Representing Ukraine
Pairs' Figure skating
Winter Universiade
Silver medal – second place	2005 Innsbruck	Pairs
Silver medal – second place	2007 Turin	Pairs

Tatiana Andreyеvna Volosozhar (Russian: Татьяна Андреевна Волосожар, Ukrainian: Тетяна Андріївна Волосожар; born 22 May 1986) is a Ukrainian-born Russian pair skater. With Maxim Trankov, she is the two-time 2014 Olympic champion in the pairs and in team events, the 2013 World champion, a four-time (2012, 2013, 2014 and 2016) European champion, the 2012 Grand Prix Final champion, and a three-time (2011, 2013 and 2016) Russian national champion. They have also won six events on the Grand Prix series.

Volosozhar competed for Ukraine with Petr Kharchenko in 2000–04 and with Stanislav Morozov in 2004–10. She and Morozov are four-time Ukrainian national champions (2005, 2007, 2008 and 2010) and finished as high as fourth at the World Championships. In December 2010 she was granted expedited Russian citizenship, as both her parents are Russian.

Volosozhar and Trankov are the historic World record holders for the short program, before the scoring change in the 2018–19 season. They are the first figure skaters to win two gold medals at the same Olympics, having taken gold in pairs and in the inaugural team event.

== Early years ==
Volosozhar began skating at the age of four. The instructors at her skating class were initially dismissive, saying she was overweight, but gave her three months and eventually agreed to keep her. At age 14, she switched from singles to pairs, to her father's dismay.

As a junior, Volosozhar skated for four years with Petr Kharchenko. They trained in Dnipropetrovsk in very poor conditions until they were able to move to Kyiv in 2003; Volosozhar was accompanied by her mother. Their coach in Kyiv was Galina Kukhar. The pair won several medals on the Junior Grand Prix circuit and were the Ukrainian national champions in 2004. That same season, they finished fifth at Junior Worlds and 14th at senior Worlds. They split at the end of the 2003–04 season.

== Partnership with Morozov ==
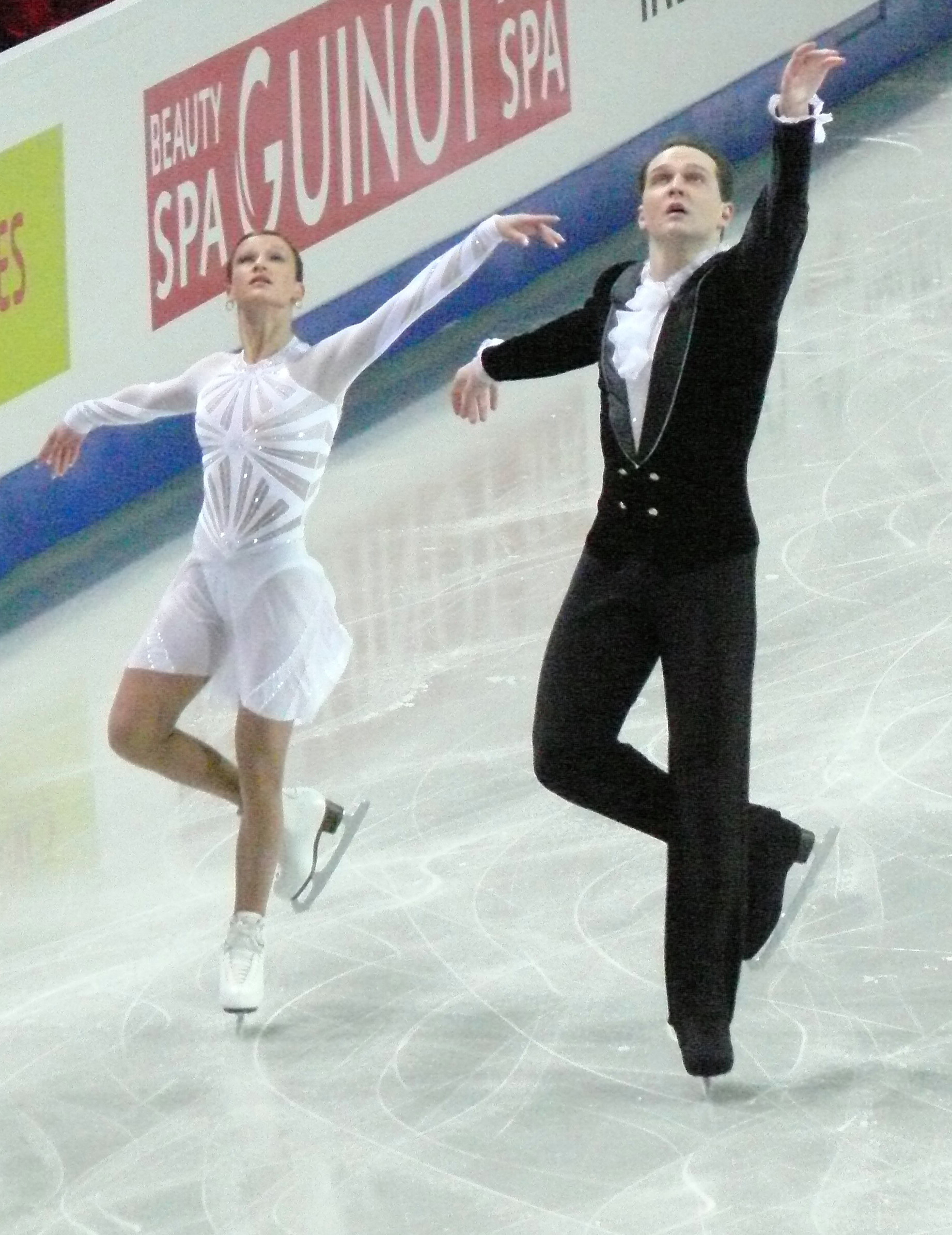
Volosozhar with Morozov at the 2007 European Championships

Volosozhar and Stanislav Morozov teamed up prior to the 2004–05 season and were coached by Galina Kukhar. In their first season together, they were silver medalists at the Winter Universiade and finished fifth at the European Championships. Volosozhar/Morozov began the 2005–06 season with a win at the 2005 Karl Schäfer Memorial and placed 12th at the 2006 Winter Olympics. In 2006–07, the pair finished fifth again at the European Championships and fourth at the World Championships.

During the 2007–08 season, Volosozhar/Morozov came close to winning a medal at the European Championships but placed ninth at the World Championships. At the end of the season, the pair changed coaches and began working with Ingo Steuer in Chemnitz, Germany. Conditions in Ukraine had steadily deteriorated until there was only one good rink, although Morozov said reaching it was not simple, "You can't get to the entrance; you need to jump over holes, it's like a precipice." After moving to train in Chemnitz, they won their first Grand Prix medals—silver at the 2008 Cup of China and bronze at the 2008 Cup of Russia—and qualified for the 2008–09 Grand Prix Final, where they placed fourth. They also placed fourth at the 2009 European Championships and were sixth at the 2009 World Championships.

In the 2009–10 season, Volosozhar/Morozov won a bronze medal at the 2009 Cup of China and silver at the 2009 Skate America. They again placed fourth at the European Championships and then came in eighth at the 2010 Winter Olympics. Morozov retired from competition before the 2010 World Championships. The pair performed in shows together in the spring of 2010.

== Partnership with Trankov ==
=== Beginnings ===
Volosozhar decided to continue her competitive career. In March 2010, rumors emerged that she might team up with Maxim Trankov. Trankov later said that he had been interested in skating with Volosozhar since 2006.

The head of the Ukrainian trainers' council admitted there were no partners for her in the country who could compete at a high level, and on 14 May 2010, it was reported that Ukraine would not interfere with her decision to compete for Russia. Russian coach Ludmila Velikova confirmed that Russia had attempted years earlier to persuade Volosozhar to skate under its colors, however, the Ukrainian skating federation believed she would be successful with Stanislav Morozov.

Volosozhar left her previous training base in Germany to train in Moscow, beginning training with Trankov the week of 17 May. They are coached by Nina Mozer. Stanislav Morozov is their assistant coach, helping them with their elements. Igor Tchinaev was their short program choreographer, with Nikolai Morozov choreographing the long program. Nikolai Morozov also worked with them on their stroking to reduce energy loss. The pair had some differences in technique—Volosozhar had to change pace on the entry to the twist as well as adapt to a different hold during throw jumps, while Trankov had to adjust his jumps to match his new partner.

=== 2010–2011 season ===
Volosozhar/Trankov initially performed in domestic Russian cup events and other tests. In late December 2010, they won gold at the 2011 Russian Championships, defeating Yuko Kavaguti / Alexander Smirnov, the reigning national champions and World bronze medalists.

Per ISU regulations, Volosozhar was barred from international competition for one year from her last event representing Ukraine, the 2010 Winter Olympics. As a result, the pair missed much of the 2010–11 season, including the Grand Prix series and the European Championships. She became eligible for international competition on 16 February 2011, in time for the Mont Blanc Trophy, where the pair competed to meet the ISU's minimum technical score requirements for the World Championships. They did so easily and won the event by a sizable margin. The pair decided to fly in early for the World Championships and landed in Tokyo three hours before the earthquake. The event was rescheduled and moved to Moscow.

At the 2011 World Championships, Volosozhar/Trankov placed third in the short program, second in the free skate, and won the silver medal behind 2009 champions Aliona Savchenko / Robin Szolkowy and ahead of the defending champions, Qing Pang / Jian Tong. It was the first World medal for both partners. The pair are one of few in modern times to reach the World podium in their first season together and in their first appearance at a major international event. Media coverage of the event noted their fast development and their potential for the future. Volosozhar said, "We didn't even think about the silver medal (before Worlds). We thought, maybe we can get the bronze. The result was completely unexpected for us. The most impressive moment of the championships was how enthusiastic the spectators were even before our short program, and I'll never forget how they gave us a standing ovation after the free program."

=== 2011–2012 season ===
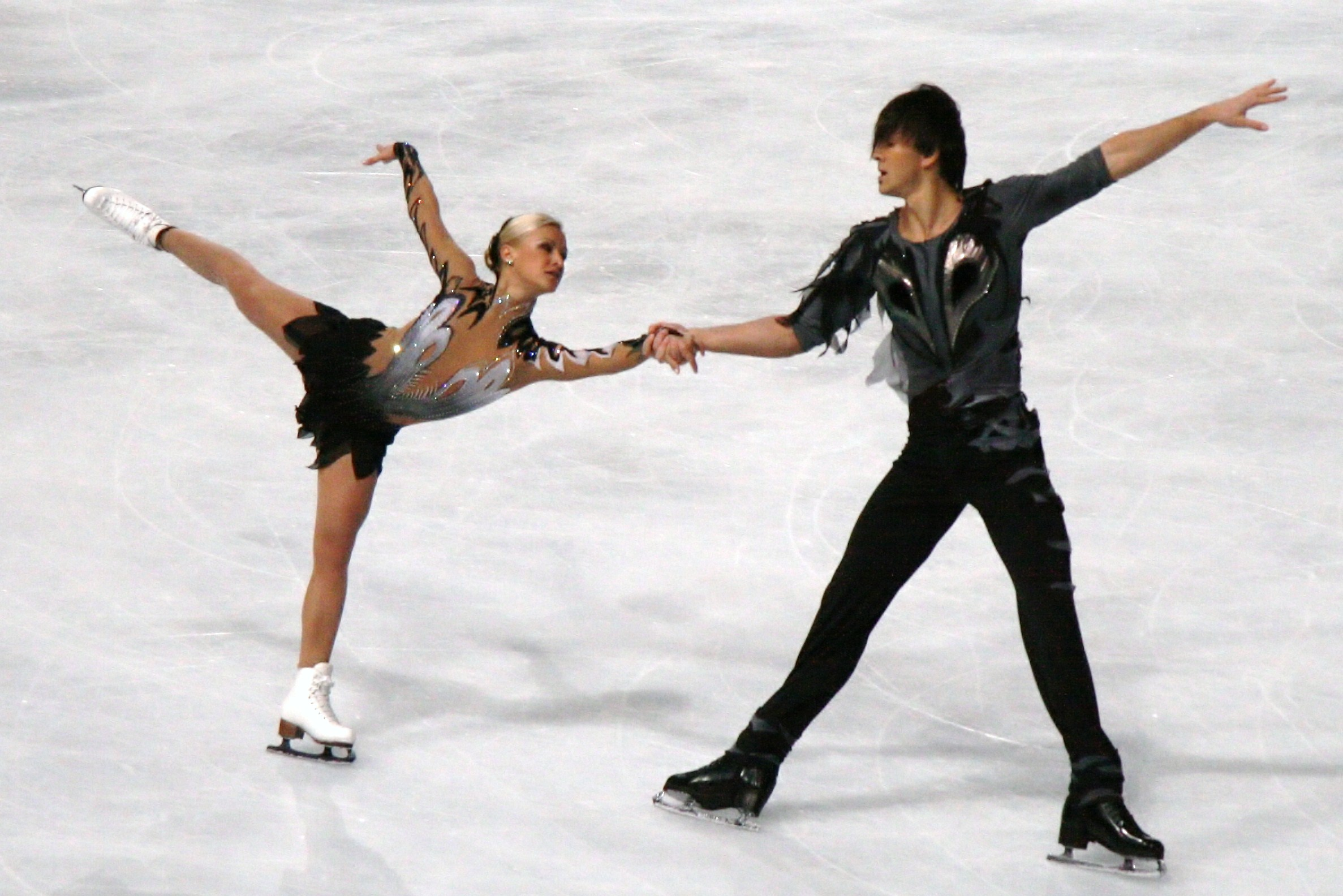
Volosozhar and Trankov at the 2011 Trophée Bompard

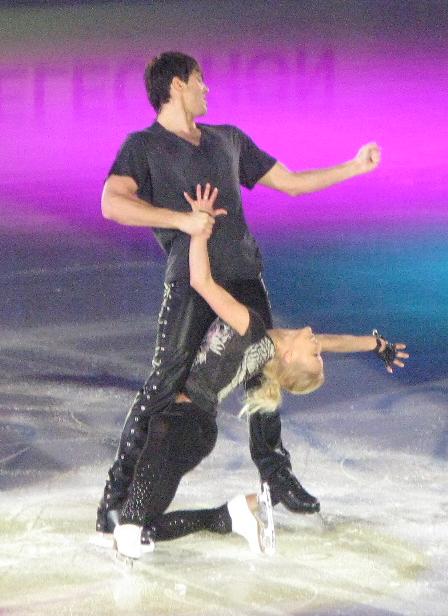
Volosozhar/Trankov at 2012 World Championships.

During the off-season, Volosozhar/Trankov performed in shows and prepared for the new season in Novogorsk, as well as a few weeks in New Jersey. In the summer, Trankov sustained a shoulder injury while skating on unsharpened blades since no one with the expertise was available at the time; As a result, they stopped working on lifts for a while.

Volosozhar/Trankov began the 2011–12 season with wins at their two September competitions, the 2011 Nebelhorn Trophy and the 2011 Ondrej Nepela Memorial. Trankov partly tore a groin tendon at the Nepela Memorial. On the Grand Prix series, the pair won Skate Canada with a combined score of 201.38 points and then won the 2011 Trophée Eric Bompard to qualify for the Grand Prix Final. Trankov's inguinal rings (groin) injury caused them to change a pair spin at the Grand Prix Final. Volosozhar/Trankov were the leaders after the short program but placed second to Savchenko/Szolkowy in the free skate and were awarded the silver medal – only 0.18 of a point separating the two teams at the end of the competition. At the post-event press conference, they said they would miss Russian Nationals to recover fully from their injuries.

At the 2012 European Championships, Volosozhar/Trankov placed first in both programs and won their first European title. They were eighth in the short program at the 2012 World Championships in Nice, France, after both fell on a death spiral. Trankov commented on the ice quality, saying "It is soft in some places, brittle in others. I guess it is ok if you skate right after ice resurfacing, but if you are the last one to skate in the second group, it is quite another story." Volosozhar/Trankov rebounded to place first in the free skate with a new personal best score of 140.90 in the segment. With a total score 0.11 points less than Savchenko/Szolkowy, they won their second World silver medal and received a small gold medal for the free skate.

=== 2012–2013 season ===
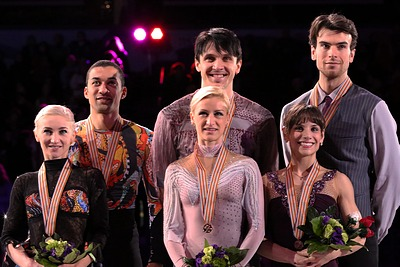
Volosozhar and Trankov at the 2013 World Championships podium.

In preparation for the 2012–13 season, the pair spent nearly three months in the U.S. in the summer of 2012 and then spent some time training in Italy. Volosozhar/Trankov won both of their Grand Prix assignments, the 2012 Skate America and the 2012 Cup of Russia, and qualified for the 2012–13 Grand Prix Final in Sochi, Russia. At the Final, they were first in the short program, second in the long program, and won the gold medal ahead of Russian teammates Vera Bazarova / Yuri Larionov. Volosozhar/Trankov then won their second national title, at the 2013 Russian Championships.

Trankov's father died of a sudden heart attack on 20 January 2013, a few days before the 2013 European Championships; an official confirmed the pair would compete at the event. They placed first in both programs and won the gold medal with a total score of 212.45—more than seven points ahead of silver medalists Aliona Savchenko / Robin Szolkowy. At the post-event press conference, Volosozhar said, "It is difficult to raise the mood at this time, but I am glad we made the decision to compete here." Volosozhar/Trankov spent some time training in West Orange, New Jersey just prior to the 2013 World Championships in London, Ontario. In March, the pair won their first World title, placing first in both programs and finishing 20.15 points overall ahead of Savchenko/Szolkowy. They set a new pairs' world record in the free skate and combined score (225.71 points) and became Russia's first pairs gold medalists since 2005 when Totmianina/Marinin won the World title. At their first team event, the 2013 World Team Trophy, Volosozhar/Trankov placed first in pairs and Team Russia finished fourth overall.

=== 2013–2014 season ===
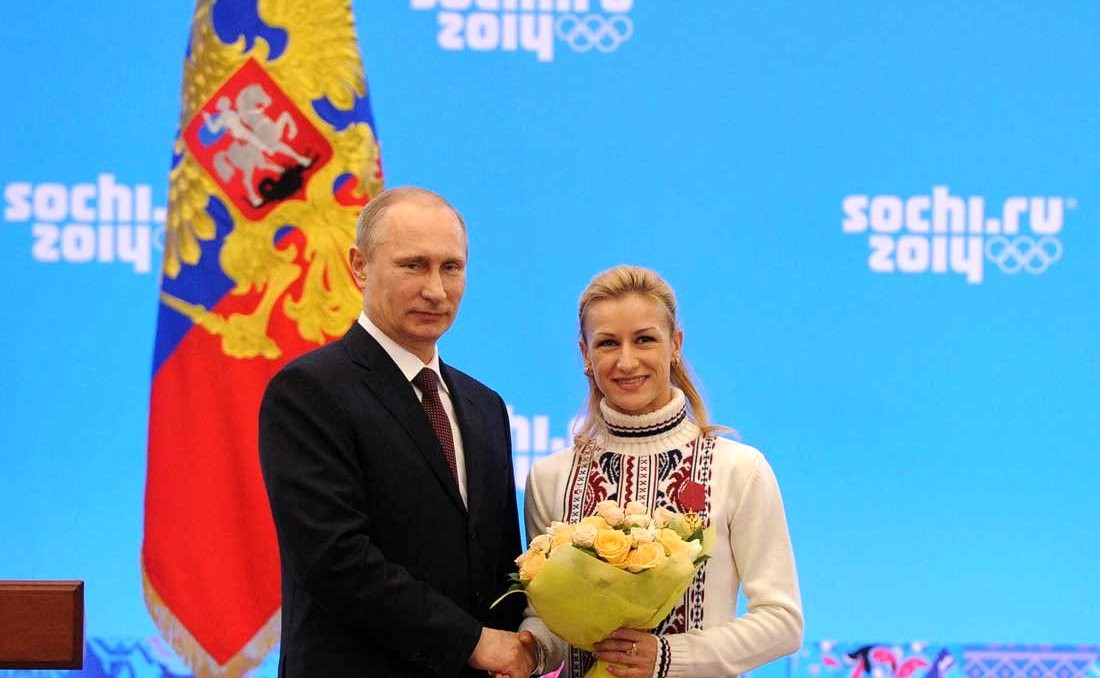
Volosozhar at the awarding ceremony for Russian athletes with President Vladimir Putin

Volosozhar/Trankov trained in Moscow, Sochi, West Orange, New Jersey, and Italy in preparation for the 2013–14 season and planned to perform in a reduced number of shows. The pair started their season with gold at the 2013 Nebelhorn Trophy, breaking their own world record scores and scoring a total of 231.96 points. They also won gold at their two Grand Prix events, the 2013 Skate America and 2013 NHK Trophy. At Skate America, Volosozhar/Trankov broke their world records again—posting scores of 83.05 (SP), 154.66 (FS), and 237.71 (total)—while at the NHK Trophy they obtained a total of 236.49 points. Having qualified for their third Grand Prix Final, they were second to Savchenko/Szolkowy in Fukuoka, Japan, and then took the gold medal at the 2014 European Championships in Budapest, Hungary.

Volosozhar/Trankov were sent to the 2014 Winter Olympics in Sochi and assigned to the short program in the inaugural team event. The pair placed first in their segment and Team Russia went on to win the gold medal. Volosozhar/Trankov broke their world record again in the pairs skate, posting a score of 84.17 to come in first in the short program and placed first in the free skate with an overall score of 236.86 points, winning the gold medal by more than 18.18 points from silver medalists, teammates Ksenia Stolbova and Fedor Klimov. Volosozhar/Trankov received the Order "For Merit to the Fatherland" 4th class with Russian President Vladimir Putin handing the state awards.

=== 2014–2015 season ===
For the 2014–2015 Grand Prix season, Volosozhar and Trankov were assigned to Skate America and Rostelecom Cup. However, the pair ultimately decided to withdraw due to Trankov's shoulder injury that will require a surgery. They decided to sit out the whole season for Trankov's surgery rehabilitation.

=== 2015–2016 season ===
For the 2015–2016 Grand Prix season, after sitting out the previous season, Volosozhar and Trankov returned to competition at the 2015 Nebelhorn Trophy where they won the gold medal with a score of 202.79 points. They were assigned to the 2015 Trophée Éric Bompard and the 2015 NHK Trophy as their Grand Prix events. Volosozhar and Trankov were first in the short program at the Trophee Eric Bompard, a result that became final after the second day of the competition was cancelled in the wake of the November 2015 Paris attacks. They withdrew from the NHK Trophy after she suffered an injury in practice. Recovering from her injury, Volosozhar and Trankov decided to compete at the 2016 Russian Championships scheduled on 24–27 December in Ekaterinburg, Russia. They placed first in both the short program and free skate to win their third national title.

On 27–31 January, Volosozhar and Trankov competed at the 2016 European Championships in Bratislava, Slovakia, took their fourth European title with a total of 222.66 points, outclassing the second-place finishers, Germans Aliona Savchenko and her new pairs partner Bruno Massot, by more than 22 points.

=== 2016–2017 season ===
Volosozhar and Trankov decided to skip the season, and announced they were expecting a baby.

== Television ==
She appeared in the seventh season of ice show contest Ice Age.

== Personal life ==
Volosozhar was born in Dnipropetrovsk, Ukrainian SSR, to parents of Russian origin – her mother was born in Kaliningrad and her father in Nizhny Tagil. Her father is in the army and she also has a sister. Her first language is Russian and she also understands Ukrainian very well, although she does not speak it perfectly. Volosozhar was eligible for expedited Russian citizenship, which she received in December 2010. Volosozhar also communicates in English. In February 2015, it was publicly announced that she and her skating partner, Maxim Trankov became engaged. They got married on 18 August 2015. On 23 September 2016, Volosozhar confirmed that she and Trankov were expecting their first child, a daughter, due February 2017. On 16 February 2017, Tatiana gave birth to their daughter, Angelica Maximovna Volosozhar-Trankova. On 27 January 2021, Volosozhar confirmed that she and Trankov were expecting their second child, a son, due end of May/early June 2021. On 27 May 2021, Tatiana gave birth to their son, Fedor ('Theodore Maximovich').

== Records and achievements ==
=== List of world record scores set by Volosozhar/Trankov ===
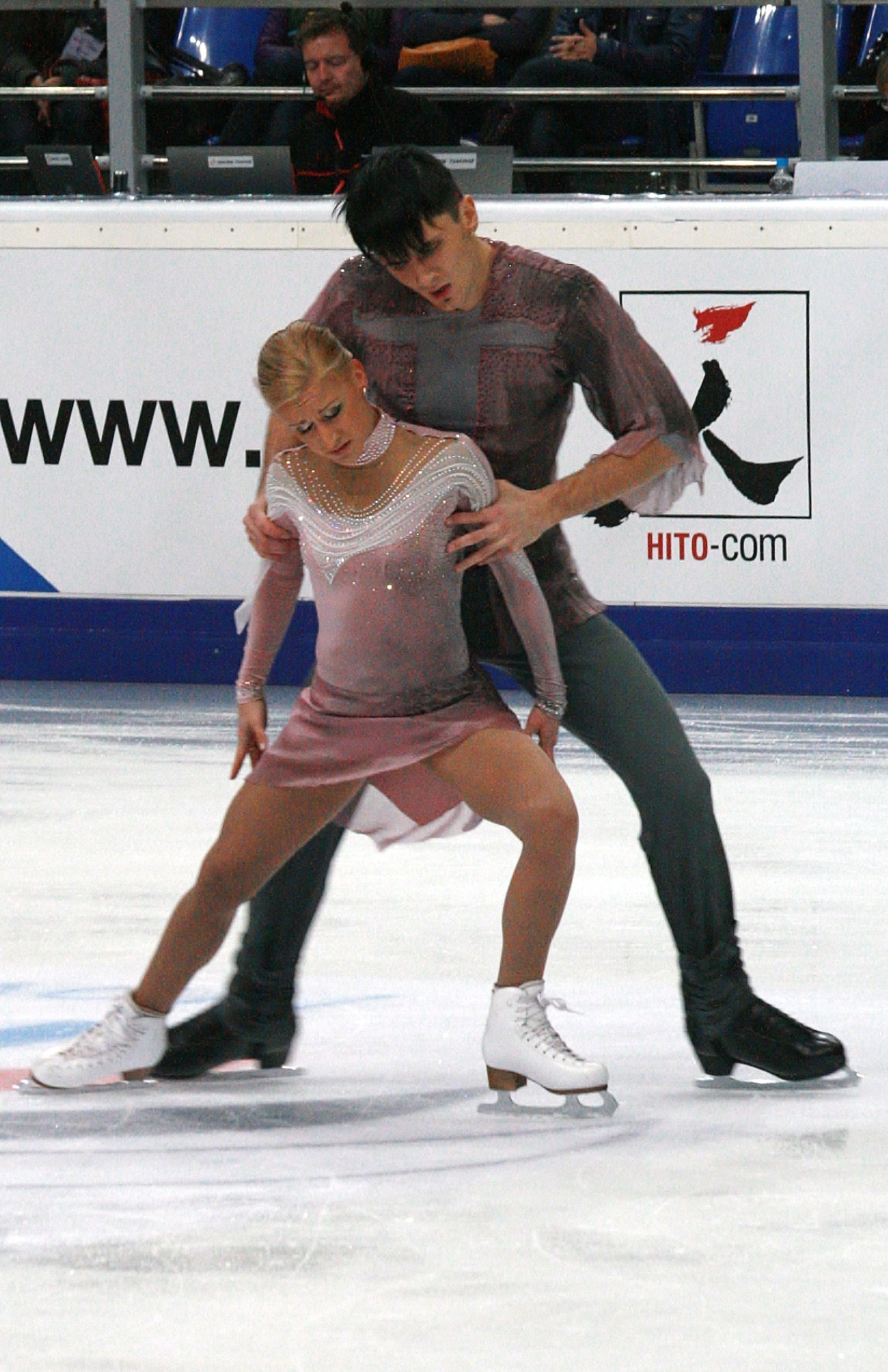
Volosozhar and Trankov at the 2012 Rostelecom Cup.

Combined total records
Date	Score	Event	Note
20 October 2013	237.71	2013 Skate America	The record was broken by Aliona Savchenko / Bruno Massot on 22 March 2018.
27 September 2013	231.96	2013 Nebelhorn Trophy	They became the first pair to score above 230 points.
15 March 2013	225.71	2013 World Championships	They became the first pair to score above 220 points.
Short program records
Date	Score	Event	Note
11 February 2014	84.17	2014 Winter Olympics	Standing world record score until the GOE system were changed on 1 July 2018.
17 January 2014	83.98	2014 European Championships	
19 October 2013	83.05	2013 Skate America	
26 September 2013	81.65	2013 Nebelhorn Trophy	They became the first pair to score above 80 points in SP.
Free skating records
Date	Score	Event	Note
20 October 2013	154.66	2013 Skate America	The record was broken by Sui Wenjing / Han Cong on 11 November 2017.
27 September 2013	150.31	2013 Nebelhorn Trophy	They became the first pair to score above 150 points in FS.
15 March 2013	149.87	2013 World Championships	

== Programs ==
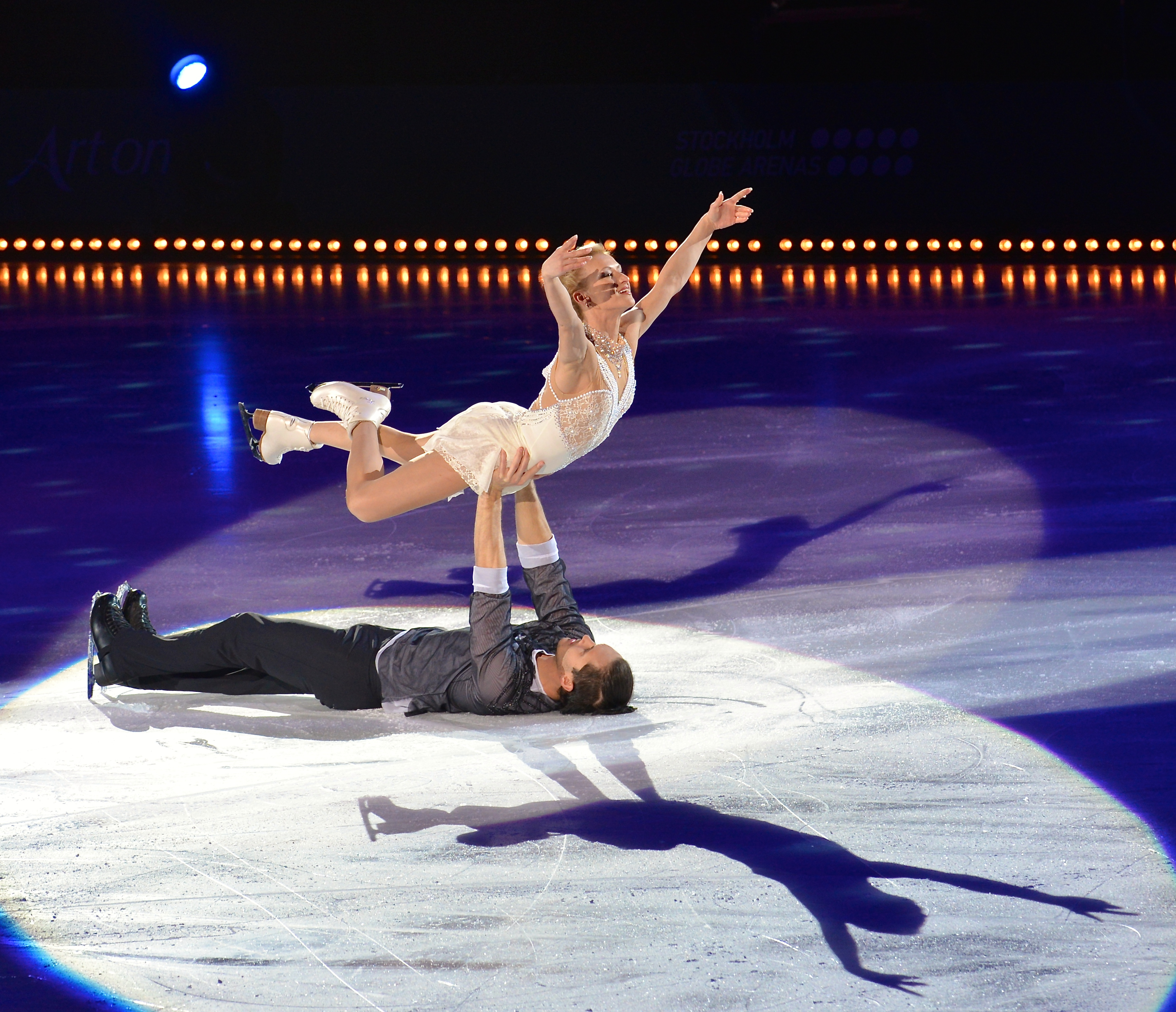
Tatiana Volosozhar & Maxim Trankov in Art on Ice 2014

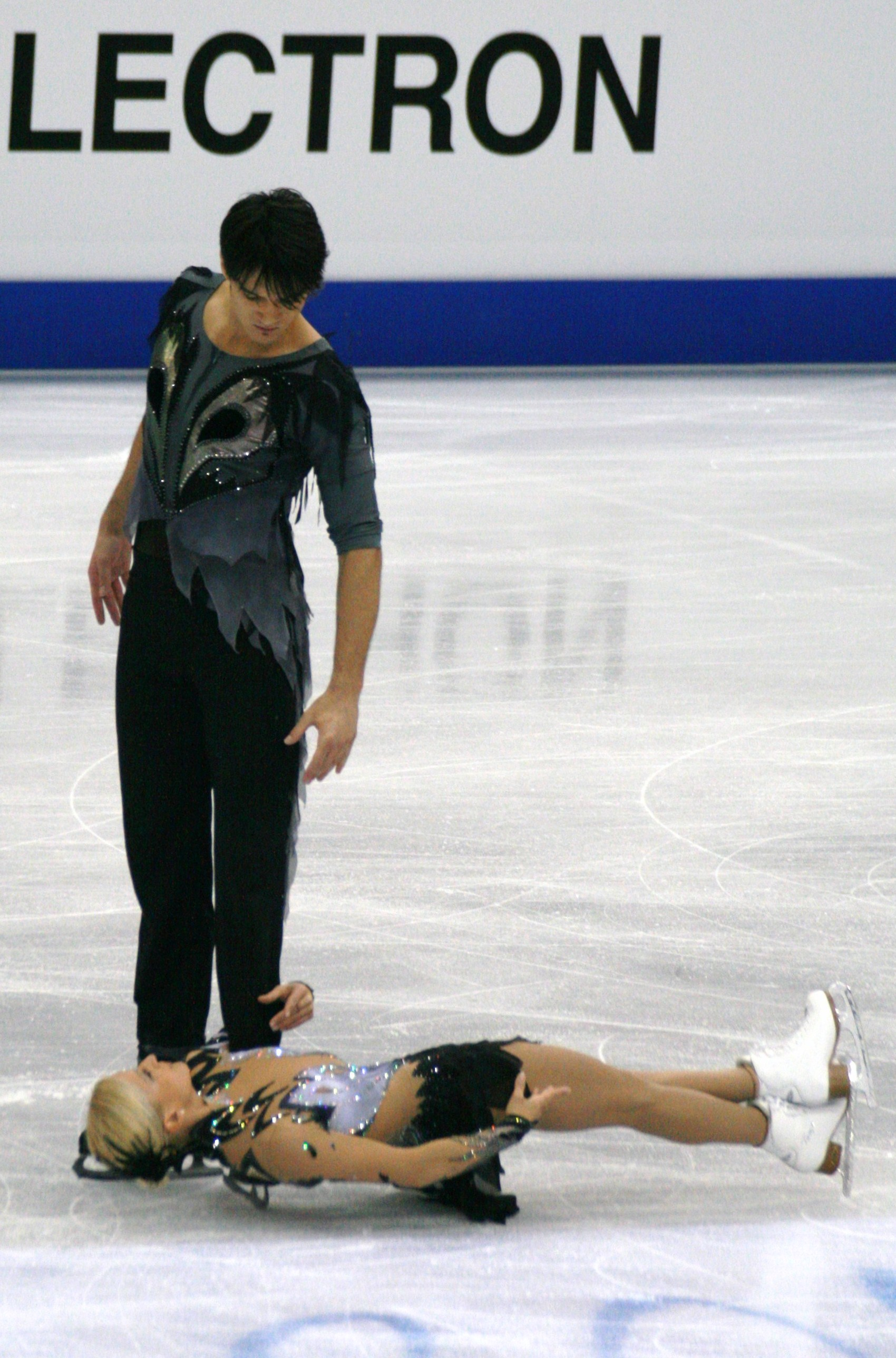
Volosozhar and Trankov at the 2012 World Championships

=== With Trankov ===
Season	Short program	Free skating	Exhibition
2015–2016	Nagada Sang Dhol Indian Themed Music by Siddharth-Garima choreo. by Nikolai Morozov	Bram Stoker's Dracula by Wojciech Kilar; Van Helsing by Alan Silvestri choreo. by Nikolai Morozov	Opyat' Metel' (Russian: Опять Метель) (from The Irony of Fate 2) by Alla Pugacheva and Kristina Orbakaitė; Let's Do It, Let's Fall in Love performed by Tina Louise
2014–2015	Nagada Sang Dhol Indian Themed Music by Siddharth-Garima choreo. by Nikolai Morozov	Dracula by Philip Glass; Van Helsing by Alan Silvestri choreo. by Nikolai Morozov	Let's Do It, Let's Fall in Love performed by Tina Louise; Stars by Nelly Furtado; Another Love by Tom Odell
2013–2014	Masquerade Waltz by Aram Khachaturian	Jesus Christ Superstar by Andrew Lloyd Webber	Skyfall by Adele; One Man's Dream by Yanni
2012–2013	Love Theme from The Godfather by Nino Rota	Violin Muse by Ikuko Kawai (Based on: Partita for Violin No. 2 by Johann Sebastian Bach; Chaconne by Tomaso Vitali )	Opyat' Metel' (Russian: Опять Метель) (from The Irony of Fate 2) by Alla Pugacheva and Kristina Orbakaitė
2011–2012	Bring Me to Life by Evanescence arranged by Alex Goldstein	Black Swan by Clint Mansell, Pyotr Tchaikovsky choreo. by Nikolai Morozov	Yeah Right by Dionne Bromfield; Aimer (from Roméo et Juliette, de la Haine à l'Amour); Super Mario
2010–2011	Carmina Burana by Carl Orff choreographed by Igor Tchinaev	Romeo and Juliet by Sergei Prokofiev choreographed by Nikolai Morozov	Super Mario choreo. by Nikolai Morozov; L'Amore sei tu by Katherine Jenkins choreo. by Nikolai Morozov; Opyat' Metel' (Опять Метель) (from The Irony of Fate 2) by Alla Pugacheva, Kristina Orbakaitė choreo. by Alexander Zhulin; One Man's Dream by Yanni choreo. by Alexander Zhulin

=== With Morozov ===
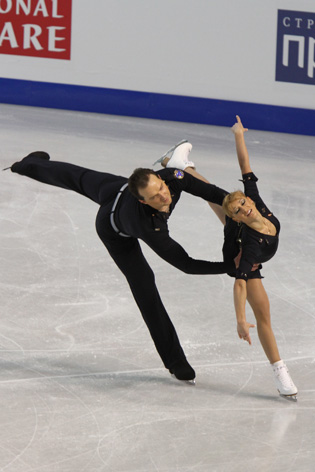
Volosozhar and Morozov compete at the 2010 European Championships.

Season	Short program	Free skating	Exhibition
2009–2010	Dreams Illusion mixed by DJI	Pearl Harbor by Hans Zimmer	Life in Mono by Mono
2008–2009	Mr. Holland's Opus by Michael Kamen	Pearl Harbor by Hans Zimmer	Life in Mono by Mono
2007–2008	The Feeling Begins by Peter Gabriel	Tears of the Sun by Hans Zimmer	Total Eclipse of the Heart by Sarah Brightman
2006–2007	Adagio by Remo Giazotto	Phantom of the Opera on Ice by Roberto Danova	Ave Maria by Franz Schubert
2005–2006	Adagio by Remo Giazotto	1492: Conquest of Paradise by Vangelis	
2004–2005	Sabre Dance by Aram Khachaturian	Moonlight Sonata by Ludwig van Beethoven	

=== With Kharchenko ===
Season	Short program	Free skating
2003–2004	Tango (from Cirque du Soleil) by René Dupéré	Notre-Dame de Paris by Riccardo Cocciante
2002–2003	Saltarello (from Secret Garden)	Romeo and Juliet by Pyotr Tchaikovsky; Romeo and Juliet by Nino Rota; Romeo and Juliet by Sergei Prokofiev
2001–2002	Concerto for Violin and Orchestra by Saint-Preux	The Lady and the Hooligan by Dmitri Shostakovich Russian Symphonic Orchestra

== Competitive highlights ==
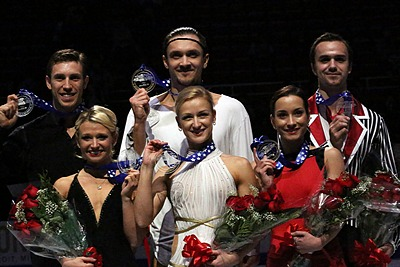
Volosozhar and Trankov at the 2013 Skate America

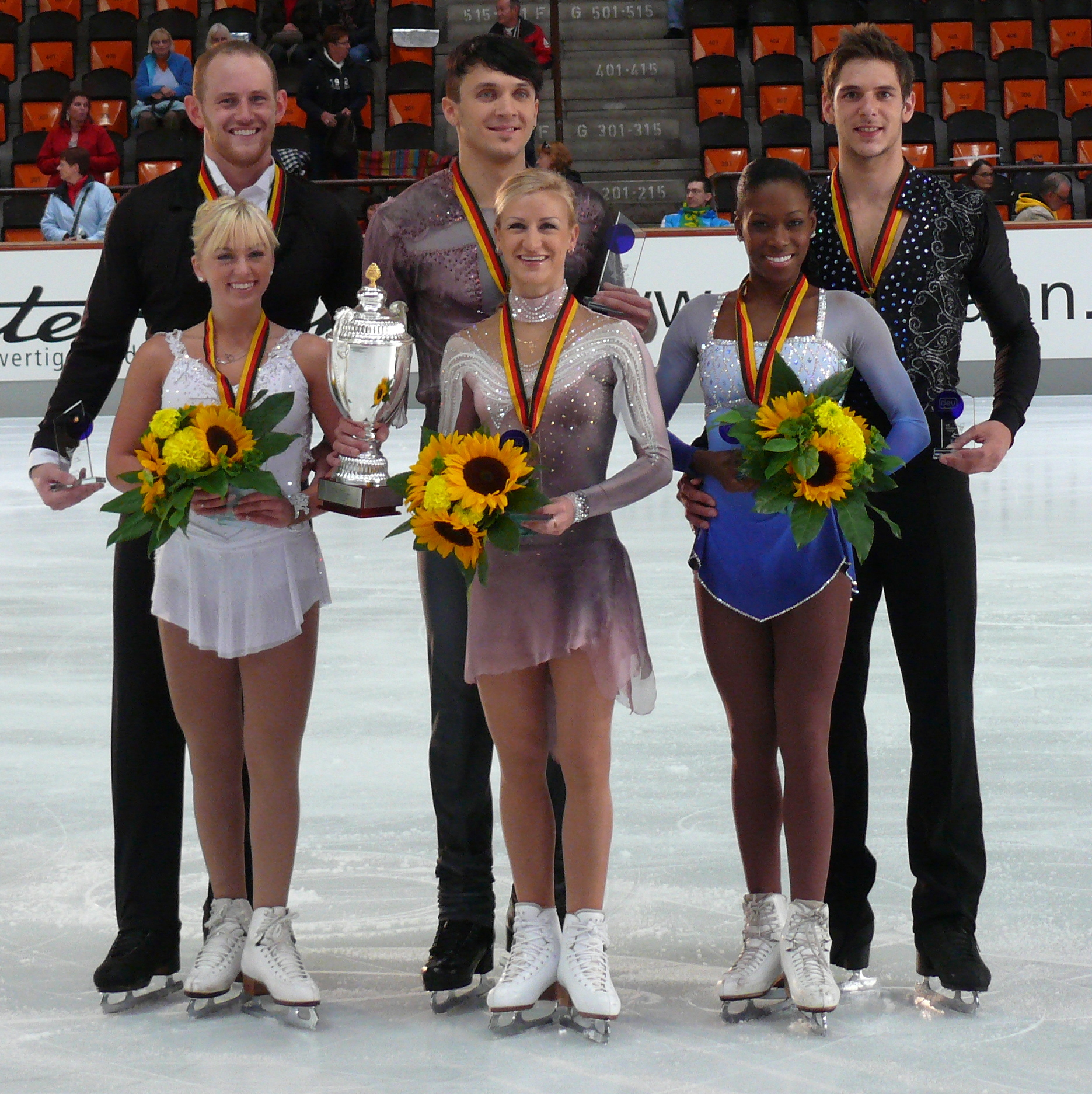
Volosozhar and Trankov at the 2012 Nebelhorn Trophy

=== With Trankov for Russia ===
Results
International
Event	2010–11	2011–12	2012–13	2013–14	2014–15	2015–16	2016–17
Olympics				1st			
Worlds	2nd	2nd	1st			6th	
Europeans		1st	1st	1st		1st	
Grand Prix Final		2nd	1st	2nd			
GP Bompard		1st				1st	
GP Cup of China					WD		
GP NHK Trophy				1st		WD	
GP Rostelecom			1st				
GP Skate America			1st	1st	WD		
GP Skate Canada		1st					
Nebelhorn		1st	1st	1st		1st	
Ondrej Nepela		1st					
Mont Blanc	1st						
National
Russian Champ.	1st		1st			1st	WD
Team events
Olympics				1st T 1st P			
World Team			4th T 1st P				
GP = Grand Prix; T = Team result; P = Personal result; Medals awarded for team result only.

=== With Morozov for Ukraine ===
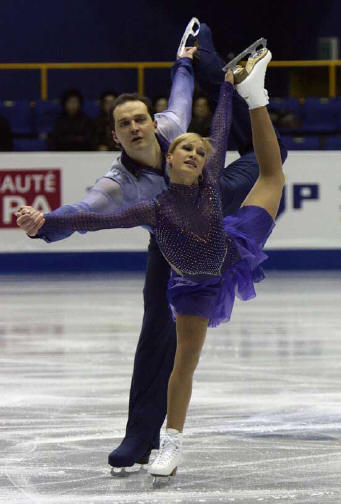
Volosozhar and Morozov compete at the 2008 Grand Prix Final.

Results
International
Event	2004–05	2005–06	2006–07	2007–08	2008–09	2009–10
Olympics		12th				8th
Worlds	10th	10th	4th	9th	6th	
Europeans	5th		5th	4th	4th	4th
Grand Prix Final					4th	
GP Bompard				5th		
GP Cup of China					2nd	3rd
GP Cup of Russia	5th				3rd	
GP NHK Trophy				4th		
GP Skate America						2nd
Karl Schäfer		1st				
Nebelhorn					3rd	2nd
Universiade	2nd		2nd			
National
Ukrainian Champ.	1st		1st	1st		1st
GP = Grand Prix

=== With Kharchenko for Ukraine ===
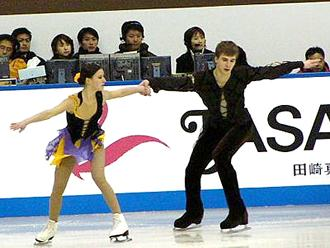
Volosozhar and Kharchenko compete at the 2003 NHK Trophy.

Results
International
Event	2000–01	2001–02	2002–03	2003–04
Worlds			17th	14th
Europeans			7th	WD
GP Cup of China				7th
GP Cup of Russia			9th	
GP NHK Trophy				6th
International: Junior
Junior Worlds	13th	10th	7th	5th
JGP Final		7th		4th
JGP Bulgaria				2nd
JGP Czech Rep.		3rd		2nd
JGP Germany			4th	
JGP Italy			4th	
JGP Poland		2nd		
National
Ukrainian Champ.	4th	1st J.	2nd	1st
GP = Grand Prix; JGP = Junior Grand Prix

== Detailed results ==
(Small medals for short and free programs awarded only at ISU Championships – Worlds, Europeans, and Junior Worlds. At team events, medals awarded for team results only.)

=== With Trankov ===
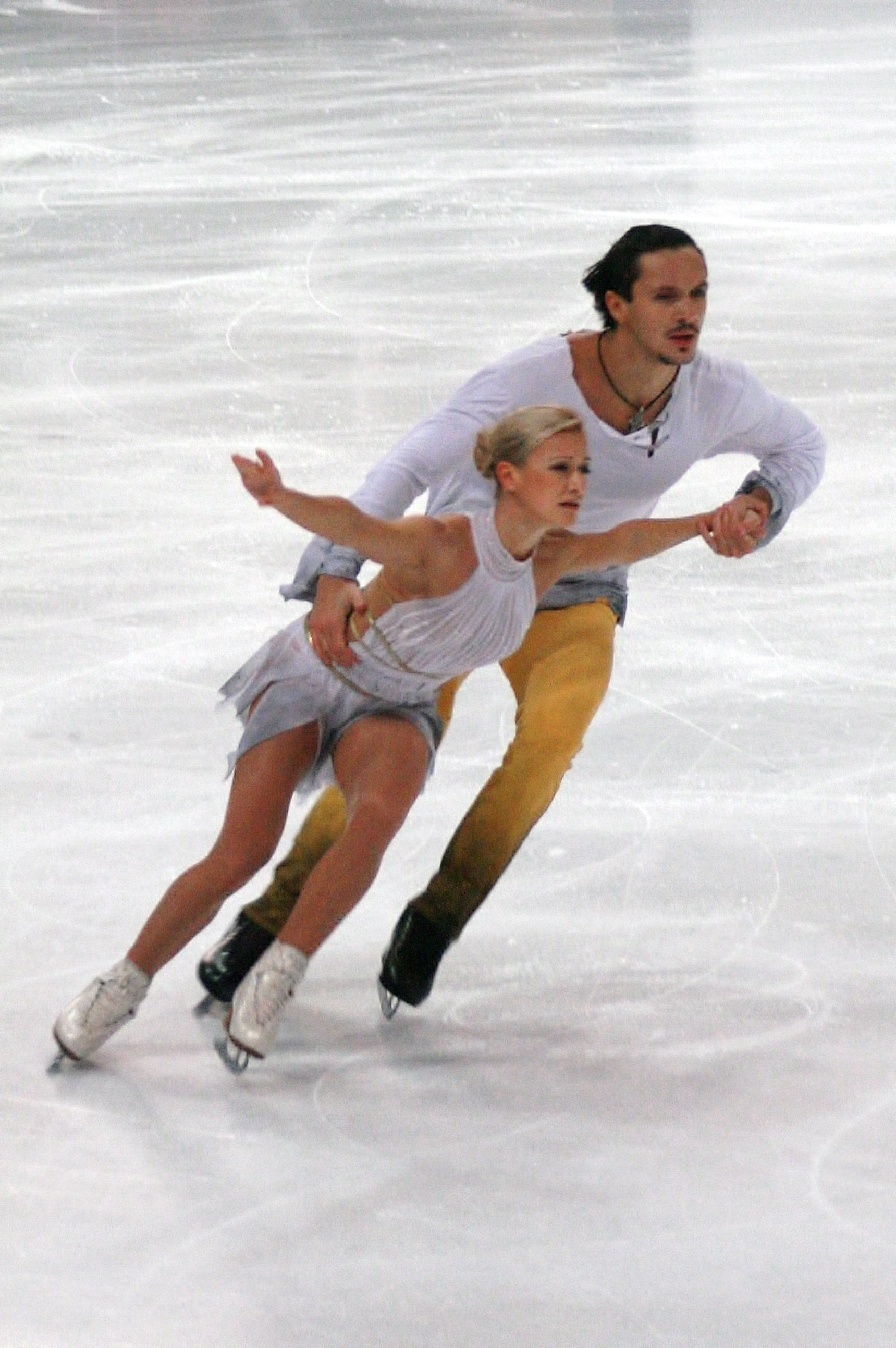
Volosozhar and Trankov at the 2013 Nebelhorn Trophy

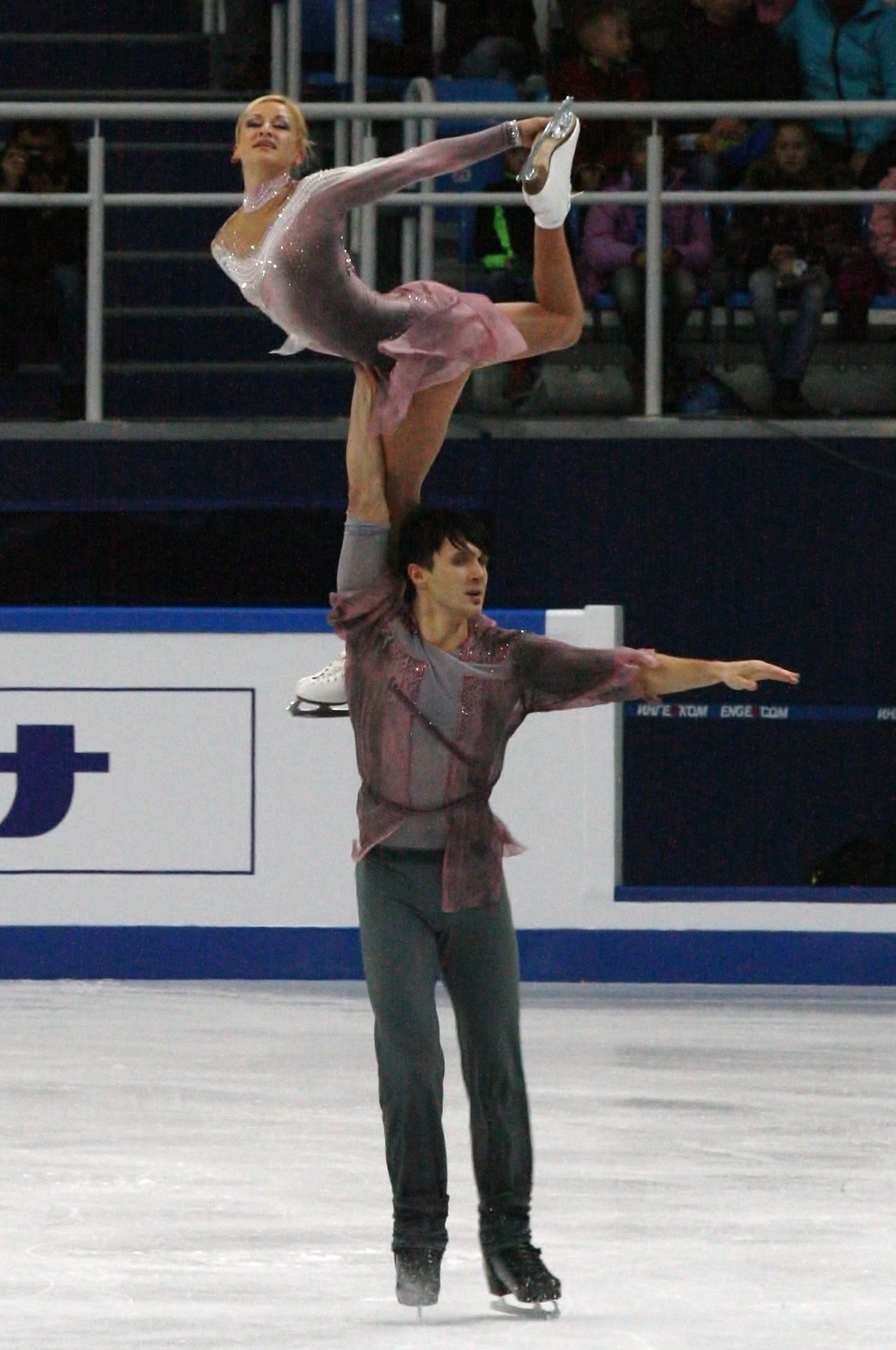
Volosozhar and Trankov at the 2012–13 Grand Prix Final

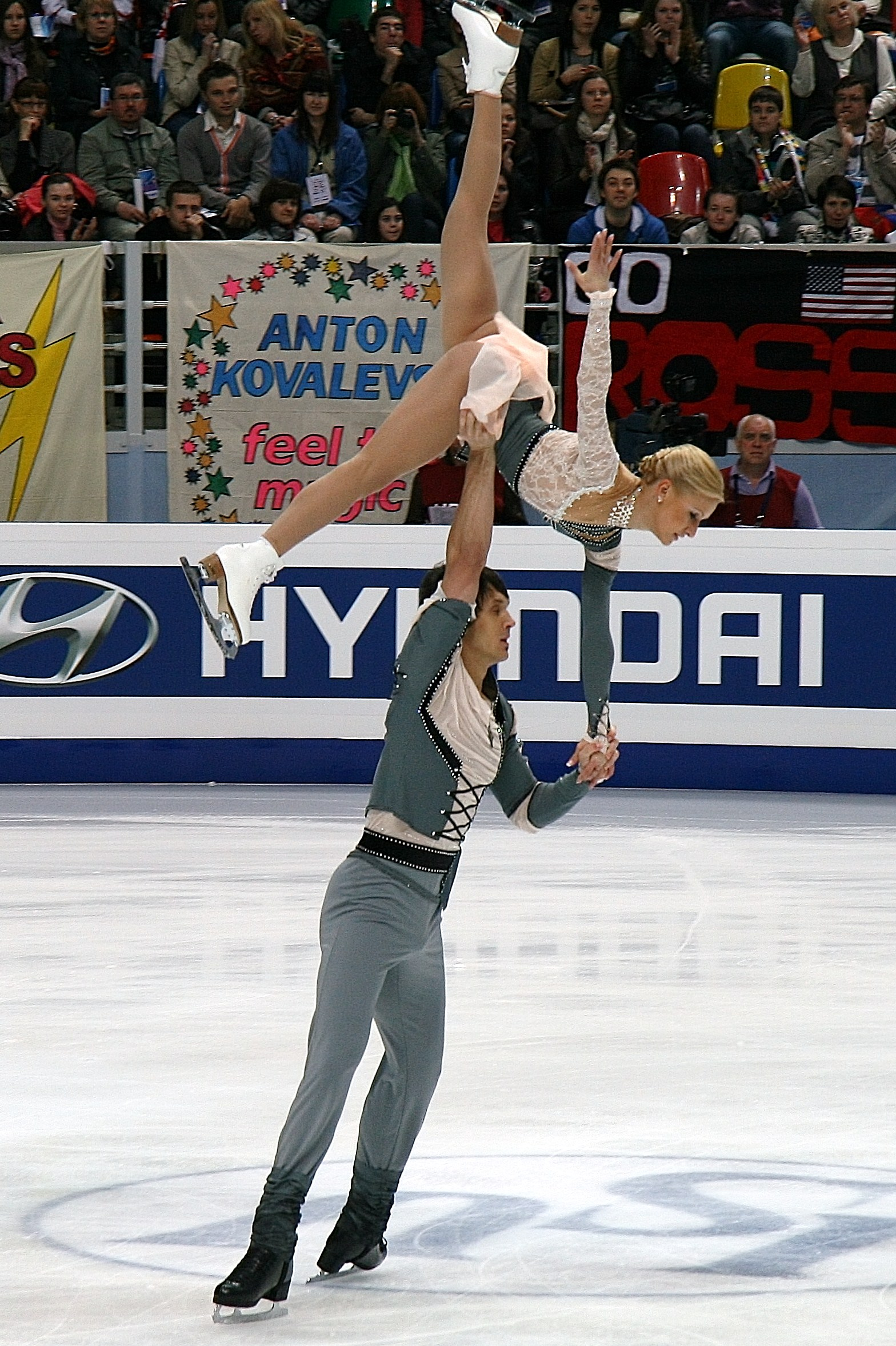
Volosozhar and Trankov at the 2011 World Championships

2015–16 season
Date	Event	SP	FS	Total
28 March – 3 April 2016	2016 World Championships	3; 77.13	7; 128.68	6; 205.81
26–31 January 2016	2016 European Championships	1; 79.77	1; 142.89	1; 222.66
23–27 December 2015	2016 Russian Championships	1; 83.65	1; 145.31	1; 228.96
13–15 November 2015	2015 Trophée Éric Bompard	1; 74.50	cancelled	1; 74.50
24–26 September 2015	2015 Nebelhorn Trophy	1; 64.87	1; 137.92	1; 202.79
2013–14 season
Date	Event	SP	FS	Total
6–22 February 2014	2014 Winter Olympics	1; 84.17	1; 152.69	1; 236.86
6–22 February 2014	2014 Winter Olympics (Team Event)	1; 83.79		1
15–19 January 2014	2014 European Championships	1; 83.98	2; 136.40	1; 220.38
5–8 December 2013	2013–14 Grand Prix Final	1; 82.65	2; 141.18	2; 223.83
8–10 November 2013	2013 NHK Trophy	1; 82.03	1; 154.46	1; 236.49
18–20 October 2013	2013 Skate America	1; 83.05	1; 154.66	1; 237.71
26–28 September 2013	2013 Nebelhorn Trophy	1; 81.65	1; 150.31	1; 231.96
2012–2013 season
Date	Event	SP	FS	Total
11–14 April 2013	2013 World Team Trophy	1; 74.41	1; 136.06	4T/1P; 210.47
13–15 March 2013	2013 World Championships	1; 75.84	1; 149.87	1; 225.71
23–27 January 2013	2013 European Championships	1; 73.23	1; 139.22	1; 212.45
25–28 December 2012	2013 Russian Championships	1; 78.69	1; 150.23	1; 228.92
6–9 December 2012	2012–13 Grand Prix Final	1; 73.46	2; 131.09	1; 204.55
9–11 November 2012	2012 Rostelecom Cup	1; 74.74	1; 132.79	1; 207.53
19–20 October 2012	2012 Skate America	1; 65.78	1; 129.29	1; 195.07
27–29 September 2012	2012 Nebelhorn Trophy	1; 65.24	1; 131.31	1; 196.55
2011–2012 season
Date	Event	SP	FS	Total
26 March – 1 April 2012	2012 World Championships	8; 60.48	1; 140.90	2; 201.38
23–29 January 2012	2012 Europeans Championships	1; 72.80	1; 137.65	1; 210.45
8–11 December 2011	2011–12 Grand Prix Final	1; 71.57	2; 140.51	2; 212.08
18–20 November 2011	2011 Trophée Eric Bompard	1; 63.69	1; 130.44	1; 194.13
27–30 October 2011	2011 Skate Canada	1; 70.42	1; 130.96	1; 201.38
28 September – 2 October 2011	2011 Nebelhorn Trophy	1; 66.48	1; 123.67	1; 190.15
21–24 September 2011	2011 Nebelhorn Trophy	1; 57.91	1; 125.74	1; 183.65
2010–2011 season
Date	Event	SP	FS	Total
25 April – 1 May 2011	2011 World Championships	3; 70.35	2; 140.38	2; 211.73
15–20 February 2011	2011 Mont Blanc Trophy	1; 68.30	1; 131.54	1; 199.84
26–29 December 2010	2011 Russian Championships	1; 72.71	1; 141.95	1; 214.66
