= 2013 Skate America =

- Type: Grand Prix
- Date: October 17 – 20
- Season: 2013–14
- Location: Detroit, Michigan
- Host: U.S. Figure Skating
- Venue: Joe Louis Arena

Champions
- Men's singles: (Japan) Tatsuki Machida
- Ladies' singles: (Japan) Mao Asada
- Pairs: (Russia) Tatiana Volosozhar / Maxim Trankov
- Ice dance: (United States) Meryl Davis / Charlie White
- Previous: 2012 Skate America
- Next: 2014 Skate America
- Next Grand Prix: 2013 Skate Canada International

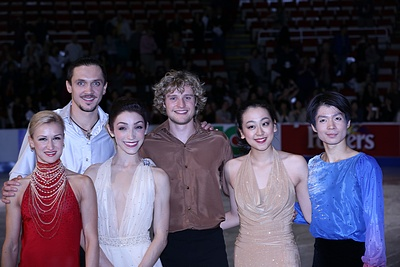

The 2013 Hilton HHonors Skate America was the first event of six in the 2013–14 ISU Grand Prix of Figure Skating, a senior-level international invitational competition series. It was held at the Joe Louis Arena in Detroit, Michigan on October 17–20. Medals were awarded in the disciplines of men's singles, ladies' singles, pair skating, and ice dancing. Skaters earned points toward qualifying for the 2013–14 Grand Prix Final.

== Eligibility ==
Skaters who reached the age of 14 before July 1, 2013 were eligible to compete on the senior Grand Prix circuit.

== Entries ==
The entries were as follows.

Country	Men	Ladies	Pairs	Ice dancing
Azerbaijan				Julia Zlobina / Alexei Sitnikov
Canada			Kirsten Moore-Towers / Dylan Moscovitch; Margaret Purdy / Michael Marinaro	
France		Maé Bérénice Méité		Pernelle Carron / Lloyd Jones
Georgia		Elene Gedevanishvili		
Italy		Valentina Marchei	Stefania Berton / Ondrej Hotarek	Anna Cappellini / Luca Lanotte
Japan	Daisuke Takahashi; Takahiko Kozuka; Tatsuki Machida	Mao Asada		Cathy Reed / Chris Reed
Lithuania				Isabella Tobias / Deividas Stagniunas
Russia	Artur Gachinski	Elena Radionova; Elizaveta Tuktamysheva	Tatiana Volosozhar / Maxim Trankov; Ksenia Stolbova / Fedor Klimov	
Sweden	Alexander Majorov	Viktoria Helgesson		
United States	Max Aaron; Jason Brown; Adam Rippon	Samantha Cesario; Ashley Wagner; Caroline Zhang	Marissa Castelli / Simon Shnapir; Caydee Denney / John Coughlin; Felicia Zhang / Nathan Bartholomay	Meryl Davis / Charlie White; Madison Hubbell / Zachary Donohue; Maia Shibutani / Alex Shibutani

=== Changes to initial lineup ===
On September 30, 2013, Evan Lysacek announced that his injury would force him out of Skate America. He was replaced by Jason Brown. Vanessa James / Morgan Cipres withdrew and were replaced by Margaret Purdy / Michael Marinaro. Brian Joubert and Denis Ten also withdrew, and no substitutes were announced.

== Results ==
=== Men ===
Rank	Name	Nation	Total points	SP		FS	
1	Tatsuki Machida	Japan	265.38	1	91.18	1	174.20
2	Adam Rippon	United States	241.24	3	80.26	3	160.98
3	Max Aaron	United States	238.36	6	75.91	2	162.45
4	Daisuke Takahashi	Japan	236.21	5	77.09	4	159.12
5	Jason Brown	United States	231.03	2	83.78	6	147.25
6	Takahiko Kozuka	Japan	230.95	4	77.75	5	153.20
7	Alexander Majorov	Sweden	208.72	7	74.97	8	133.75
8	Artur Gachinski	Russia	208.16	8	69.81	7	138.35

=== Ladies ===
Rank	Name	Nation	Total points	SP		FS	
1	Mao Asada	Japan	204.55	1	73.18	1	131.37
2	Ashley Wagner	United States	193.81	2	69.26	2	124.55
3	Elena Radionova	Russia	183.95	3	67.01	4	116.94
4	Elizaveta Tuktamysheva	Russia	176.75	9	53.20	3	123.55
5	Samantha Cesario	United States	167.98	8	53.51	5	114.47
6	Maé Bérénice Méité	France	167.35	7	55.84	6	111.51
7	Valentina Marchei	Italy	156.79	4	59.25	7	97.54
8	Viktoria Helgesson	Sweden	152.34	5	58.80	8	93.54
9	Elene Gedevanishvili	Georgia	149.44	6	56.68	9	92.76
10	Caroline Zhang	United States	110.12	10	45.76	10	64.36

=== Pairs ===
Rank	Name	Nation	Total points	SP		FS	
1	Tatiana Volosozhar / Maxim Trankov	Russia	237.71	1	83.05	1	154.66
2	Kirsten Moore-Towers / Dylan Moscovitch	Canada	208.45	2	71.51	2	136.94
3	Ksenia Stolbova / Fedor Klimov	Russia	187.35	3	64.80	3	122.55
4	Caydee Denney / John Coughlin	United States	182.43	6	62.06	4	120.37
5	Stefania Berton / Ondřej Hotárek	Italy	180.27	4	63.85	5	116.42
6	Marissa Castelli / Simon Shnapir	United States	177.11	5	62.56	6	114.55
7	Felicia Zhang / Nathan Bartholomay	United States	168.42	7	55.83	7	112.59
8	Margaret Purdy / Michael Marinaro	Canada	146.28	8	50.26	8	96.02

=== Ice dancing ===
Rank	Name	Nation	Total points	SD		FD	
1	Meryl Davis / Charlie White	United States	188.23	1	75.70	1	112.53
2	Anna Cappellini / Luca Lanotte	Italy	168.49	2	69.88	2	98.61
3	Maia Shibutani / Alex Shibutani	United States	154.47	3	61.26	3	93.21
4	Madison Hubbell / Zachary Donohue	United States	152.98	4	60.71	4	92.27
5	Cathy Reed / Chris Reed	Japan	136.13	6	54.28	5	81.85
6	Pernelle Carron / Lloyd Jones	France	135.70	7	54.10	6	81.60
7	Isabella Tobias / Deividas Stagniunas	Lithuania	134.67	8	53.17	7	81.50
8	Julia Zlobina / Alexei Sitnikov	Azerbaijan	133.76	5	54.53	8	79.23
