= Jozsef Lendvay =

Hungarian violinist

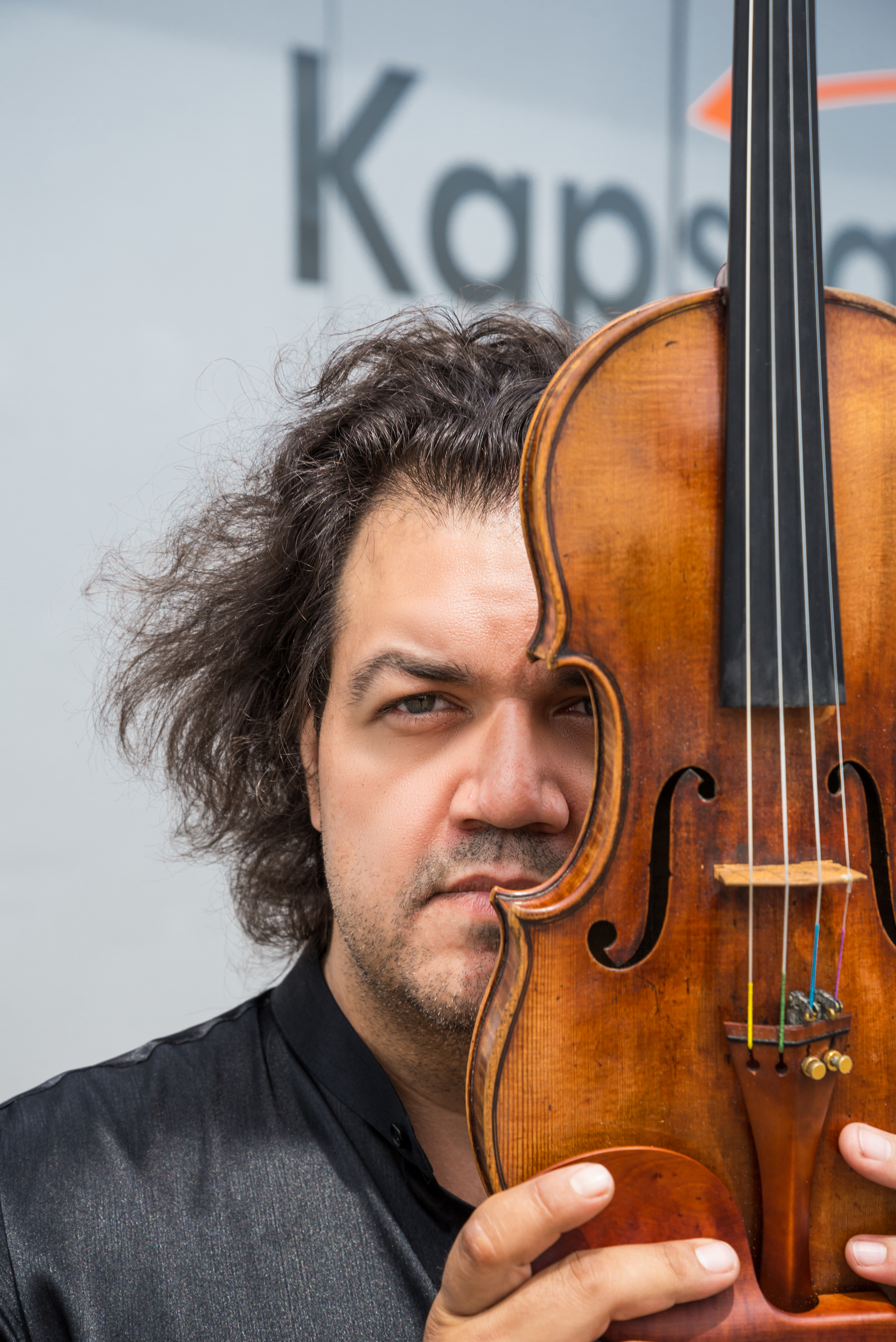
Lendvay in 2014

József Lendvay (born 1974) is a Hungarian violinist.

Born in Budapest, Hungary, József Lendvay Jr (son of famed Gypsy Violinist József "Csócsi" Lendvay) attended the Béla Bartók Conservatory in Budapest, where he studied with Miklós Szenthelyi and later the Franz Liszt Academy of Music in Budapest. His recordings include works by Sarasate and Brahms' Hungarian Dances with Iván Fischer. Lendvay has won first prize at the Köln International Violin Competition, the Ferenc Liszt Heritage Award presented by Hungary's Ministry of National Culture, and the Tibor Varga International Violin competition, among others. In 2002, he was awarded the Golden Cross for his musical contributions by the president of the Hungarian Republic.
