= 2015–16 ISU Grand Prix of Figure Skating =

- Type: Grand Prix
- Date: October 23 – December 13, 2015
- Season: 2015–16
- Previous: 2014–15 Grand Prix
- Next: 2016–17 Grand Prix

The 2015–16 ISU Grand Prix of Figure Skating was a series of senior invitational internationals which ran from October 23 to December 13, 2015. Medals were awarded in the disciplines of men's singles, ladies' singles, pair skating, and ice dancing. Skaters earned points based on their placement at each event and the top six in each discipline qualified to compete at the Grand Prix Final, held in Barcelona, Spain.

Organized by the International Skating Union, the series set the stage for the 2016 Europeans, the 2016 Four Continents, and the 2016 World Championships. The corresponding series for junior-level skaters was the 2015–16 ISU Junior Grand Prix.

== Schedule ==
The series was composed of the following events:

Date	Event	Location
October 23–25	2015 Skate America	Milwaukee, Wisconsin, United States
Oct. 30 – Nov. 1	2015 Skate Canada International	Lethbridge, Alberta, Canada
November 6–8	2015 Cup of China	Beijing, China
November 13–15	2015 Trophée Éric Bompard	Bordeaux, France
November 20–22	2015 Rostelecom Cup	Moscow, Russia
November 27–29	2015 NHK Trophy	Nagano, Japan
December 10–13	2015–16 Grand Prix Final	Barcelona, Spain

== Assignments ==
The preliminary Grand Prix assignments were announced on June 15, 2015.

=== Men ===
Skater	Assignment(s)
(Australia) Brendan Kerry	Skate America, NHK Trophy
(Canada) Elladj Baldé	Cup of China, NHK Trophy
(Canada) Patrick Chan	Skate Canada International, Trophée Éric Bompard
(Canada) Nam Nguyen	Skate Canada International, Rostelecom Cup
(China) Jin Boyang	Cup of China, NHK Trophy
(China) Yan Han	Skate America, Cup of China
(Czech Republic) Michal Březina	Skate Canada International, NHK Trophy
(France) Chafik Besseghier	Trophee Éric Bompard, NHK Trophy
(Israel) Oleksii Bychenko	Skate America, Rostelecom Cup
(Italy) Ivan Righini	Cup of China, Rostelecom Cup
(Japan) Yuzuru Hanyu	Skate Canada International, NHK Trophy
(Japan) Takahiko Kozuka	Cup of China, Rostelecom Cup
(Japan) Takahito Mura	Skate America, NHK Trophy
(Japan) Daisuke Murakami	Skate Canada International, Trophée Éric Bompard
(Japan) Shoma Uno	Skate America, Trophée Éric Bompard
(Kazakhstan) Denis Ten	Skate America, Trophée Éric Bompard
(South Korea) Kim Jin-seo	Skate Canada International, Trophée Éric Bompard
(Russia) Maxim Kovtun	Trophée Éric Bompard, NHK Trophy
(Russia) Konstantin Menshov	Skate America, NHK Trophy
(Russia) Alexander Petrov	Skate Canada International, Trophée Éric Bompard
(Russia) Adian Pitkeev	Skate America, Rostelecom Cup
(Russia) Sergei Voronov	Cup of China, Rostelecom Cup
(Spain) Javier Fernández	Cup of China, Rostelecom Cup
(United States) Max Aaron	Skate America, Trophée Éric Bompard
(United States) Richard Dornbush	Cup of China, NHK Trophy
(United States) Grant Hochstein	Cup of China, NHK Trophy
(United States) Ross Miner	Skate America, Rostelecom Cup
(United States) Adam Rippon	Skate Canada International, Rostelecom Cup
1 Assignment
(Canada) Keegan Messing	Skate Canada International
(China) Song Nan	Cup of China
(China) Wang Yi	Trophée Éric Bompard
(France) Florent Amodio	Skate America
(France) Romain Ponsart	Trophée Éric Bompard
(Japan) Sei Kawahara	Skate Canada International
(Japan) Keiji Tanaka	NHK Trophy
(South Korea) Lee June-hyoung	Skate Canada International
(Philippines) Michael Christian Martinez	Cup of China
(Russia) Mikhail Kolyada	Rostelecom Cup
(Russia) Moris Kvitelashvili	Cup of China
(United States) Jason Brown	Skate America
(United States) Timothy Dolensky	Skate Canada International
(Uzbekistan) Misha Ge	Cup of China

=== Ladies ===
Skater	Assignment(s)
(Canada) Alaine Chartrand	Skate America, Rostelecom Cup
(Canada) Gabrielle Daleman	Skate Canada International, Trophée Éric Bompard
(Canada) Kaetlyn Osmond	Skate Canada International, NHK Trophy
(China) Li Zijun	Cup of China, NHK Trophy
(Italy) Roberta Rodeghiero	Trophée Éric Bompard, Rostelecom Cup
(Japan) Mao Asada	Cup of China, NHK Trophy
(Japan) Rika Hongo	Cup of China, Rostelecom Cup
(Japan) Haruka Imai	Skate America, Trophée Éric Bompard
(Japan) Satoko Miyahara	Skate America, NHK Trophy
(Japan) Kanako Murakami	Skate Canada International, Trophée Éric Bompard
(Japan) Yuka Nagai	Skate Canada International, Rostelecom Cup
(Kazakhstan) Elizabet Tursynbaeva	Skate America, Skate Canada International
(South Korea) Park So-youn	Skate America, Cup of China
(Russia) Alena Leonova	Skate Canada International, NHK Trophy
(Russia) Yulia Lipnitskaya	Skate America, Trophée Éric Bompard
(Russia) Evgenia Medvedeva	Skate America, Rostelecom Cup
(Russia) Anna Pogorilaya	Cup of China, NHK Trophy
(Russia) Elena Radionova	Cup of China, Rostelecom Cup
(Russia) Elizaveta Tuktamysheva	Skate Canada International, Trophée Éric Bompard
(Slovakia) Nicole Rajičová	Skate America, Cup of China
(Sweden) Joshi Helgesson	Skate Canada International, Rostelecom Cup
(United States) Karen Chen	Skate America, Cup of China
(United States) Polina Edmunds	Skate Canada International, Rostelecom Cup
(United States) Gracie Gold	Skate America, Trophée Éric Bompard
(United States) Courtney Hicks	Cup of China, NHK Trophy
(United States) Hannah Miller	Cup of China, Rostelecom Cup
(United States) Ashley Wagner	Skate Canada International, NHK Trophy
1 Assignment
(Australia) Brooklee Han	Trophée Éric Bompard
(Canada) Véronik Mallet	Skate Canada International
(China) Zhao Ziquan	Cup of China
(China) Zheng Lu	Cup of China
(France) Laurine Lecavelier	Trophée Éric Bompard
(France) Maé-Bérénice Méité	Trophée Éric Bompard
(Japan) Riona Kato	Rostelecom Cup
(Japan) Mariko Kihara	NHK Trophy
(Japan) Miyu Nakashio	Skate America
(Latvia) Angelīna Kučvaļska	Trophée Éric Bompard
(Russia) Maria Artemieva	NHK Trophy
(Russia) Adelina Sotnikova	Rostelecom Cup
(Slovenia) Daša Grm	Rostelecom Cup
(Sweden) Isabelle Olsson	Skate Canada International
(United States) Mariah Bell	Skate America
(United States) Mirai Nagasu	NHK Trophy
(United States) Angela Wang	Trophée Éric Bompard

=== Pairs ===
Pair	Assignment(s)
(Austria) Miriam Ziegler / Severin Kiefer	Skate Canada International, Trophée Éric Bompard
(Canada) Meagan Duhamel / Eric Radford	Skate Canada International, NHK Trophy
(Canada) Vanessa Grenier / Maxime Deschamps	Skate Canada International, Cup of China
(Canada) Liubov Ilyushechkina / Dylan Moscovitch	Cup of China, NHK Trophy
(Canada) Kirsten Moore-Towers / Michael Marinaro	Skate Canada International, Rostelecom Cup
(Canada) Julianne Séguin / Charlie Bilodeau	Skate America, Trophée Éric Bompard
(China) Peng Cheng / Zhang Hao	Trophée Éric Bompard, Rostelecom Cup
(China) Sui Wenjing / Han Cong	Skate America, Cup of China
(China) Wang Xuehan / Wang Lei	Skate America, Cup of China
(China) Yu Xiaoyu / Jin Yang	Cup of China, NHK Trophy
(France) Vanessa James / Morgan Ciprès	Trophée Éric Bompard, NHK Trophy
(Italy) Valentina Marchei / Ondřej Hotárek	Skate Canada International, Rostelecom Cup
(Russia) Kristina Astakhova / Alexei Rogonov	Skate America, Cup of China
(Russia) Vera Bazarova / Andrei Deputat	Skate Canada International, NHK Trophy
(Russia) Yuko Kavaguti / Alexander Smirnov	Cup of China, Rostelecom Cup
(Russia) Ksenia Stolbova / Fedor Klimov	Skate America, Rostelecom Cup
(Russia) Evgenia Tarasova / Vladimir Morozov	Skate Canada International, Trophée Éric Bompard
(United States) Marissa Castelli / Mervin Tran	Skate Canada International, Trophée Éric Bompard
(United States) Tarah Kayne / Daniel O'Shea	Skate America, Rostelecom Cup
(United States) Alexa Scimeca / Chris Knierim	Skate America, NHK Trophy
1 Assignment
(Canada) Hayleigh Bell / Rudi Swiegers	Rostelecom Cup
(Germany) Mari Vartmann / Ruben Blommaert	Cup of China
(United Kingdom) Amani Fancy / Christopher Boyadji	NHK Trophy
(Italy) Nicole Della Monica / Matteo Guarise	Trophée Éric Bompard
(Russia) Tatiana Volosozhar / Maxim Trankov	Trophée Éric Bompard
(Russia) Natalja Zabijako / Alexander Enbert	Rostelecom Cup
(United States) Jessica Calalang / Zack Sidhu	NHK Trophy
(United States) Jessica Pfund / Joshua Santillan	Skate America

=== Ice dance ===
Team	Assignment(s)
(Canada) Piper Gilles / Paul Poirier	Skate America, Trophée Éric Bompard
(Canada) Kaitlyn Weaver / Andrew Poje	Skate Canada International, Rostelecom Cup
(China) Wang Shiyue / Liu Xinyu	Skate America, Cup of China
(Denmark) Laurence Fournier Beaudry / Nikolaj Sørensen	Skate Canada International, Trophée Éric Bompard
(United Kingdom) Penny Coomes / Nicholas Buckland	Trophée Éric Bompard, NHK Trophy
(Italy) Anna Cappellini / Luca Lanotte	Cup of China, Rostelecom Cup
(Italy) Charlène Guignard / Marco Fabbri	Skate Canada International, Rostelecom Cup
(Russia) Ekaterina Bobrova / Dmitri Soloviev	Skate Canada International, NHK Trophy
(Russia) Elena Ilinykh / Ruslan Zhiganshin	Cup of China, Rostelecom Cup
(Russia) Ksenia Monko / Kirill Khaliavin	Skate Canada International, Rostelecom Cup
(Russia) Victoria Sinitsina / Nikita Katsalapov	Skate America, Rostelecom Cup
(Russia) Alexandra Stepanova / Ivan Bukin	Trophée Éric Bompard, NHK Trophy
(Russia) Anna Yanovskaya / Sergey Mozgov	Skate America, Trophée Éric Bompard
(United States) Anastasia Cannuscio / Colin McManus	Skate America, NHK Trophy
(United States) Madison Chock / Evan Bates	Skate America, Cup of China
(United States) Kaitlin Hawayek / Jean-Luc Baker	Skate America, Cup of China
(United States) Madison Hubbell / Zachary Donohue	Trophée Éric Bompard, NHK Trophy
(United States) Maia Shibutani / Alex Shibutani	Skate Canada International, NHK Trophy
1 Assignment
(Belarus) Viktoria Kavaliova / Yurii Bieliaiev	Rostelecom Cup
(Canada) Élisabeth Paradis / François-Xavier Ouellette	Skate Canada International
(Canada) Alexandra Paul / Mitchell Islam	Skate Canada International
(China) Zhao Yue / Zheng Xun	Cup of China
(Japan) Emi Hirai / Marien de la Asuncion	NHK Trophy
(Japan) Kana Muramoto / Chris Reed	NHK Trophy
(South Korea) Rebeka Kim / Kirill Minov	Rostelecom Cup
(Slovakia) Federica Testa / Lukáš Csölley	Cup of China
(Turkey) Alisa Agafonova / Alper Uçar	Trophée Éric Bompard
(Ukraine) Oleksandra Nazarova / Maxim Nikitin	Skate America

=== Changes to preliminary assignments ===
==== Skate America ====
- On August 21, three out of the four host picks were announced as Ross Miner, Karen Chen, and Gretchen Donlan / Nathan Bartholomay.
- On August 26, the fourth host pick was officially announced as Anastasia Cannuscio / Colin McManus.
- On October 21, Gretchen Donlan / Nathan Bartholomay were replaced by Jessica Pfund / Joshua Santillan as Donlan / Bartholomay withdrew due to Donlan recovering from an illness.

==== Skate Canada International ====
- On July 24, Ronald Lam announced his retirement. He was officially removed from the roster on August 21. On September 4, he was officially replaced with Kim Jin-seo.
- On August 21, Véronik Mallet was announced as a host pick.
- On September 2, Vanessa Grenier / Maxime Deschamps, and Élisabeth Paradis / François-Xavier Ouellette were announced as host picks.
- On September 24, Joshua Farris was removed from the roster due to a concussion. On September 25, it was announced that he was replaced by Timothy Dolensky. Dolensky was officially added to the roster on September 28.
- On October 16, Elene Gedevanishvili was removed from the roster. No reason has been given. On October 19, her replacement was announced as Isabelle Olsson.
- On October 22, Peter Liebers was replaced by Sei Kawahara. No reason has been given.

==== Cup of China ====
- On August 17, Daniel Samohin and Lina Fedorova / Maxim Miroshkin were removed from the roster. No reasons were given. However, Samohin is not eligible to compete on the Senior Grand Prix circuit due to competing on the Junior Grand Prix this season. On August 21, Elladj Baldé and Vanessa Grenier / Maxime Deschamps were announced as their replacements.
- On September 15, Zhao Ziquan, Zheng Lu, and Cong Yue / Sun Zhuoming were added as host picks.
- On October 6, Madeline Aaron / Max Settlage were removed from the roster. No reason has been given. Their replacement was announced as Mari Vartmann / Ruben Blommaert.
- On October 15, Takahiko Kozuka was removed from the roster due to an injury. On October 16, his replacement was announced as Ivan Righini.
- On November 5, China's Cong / Sun withdrew from the ice dancing event due to a medical reason.

==== Trophée Éric Bompard ====
- On August 14, Kiira Korpi was removed from the roster. On August 21, her replacement was announced as Roberta Rodeghiero. On August 27, it was announced that Korpi had retired.
- On September 14, Chafik Besseghier was added as a host pick.
- On September 23, Brooklee Han, Miriam Ziegler / Severin Kiefer, Sara Hurtado / Adrià Díaz, and Alisa Agafonova / Alper Uçar were added to the roster in place of host picks.
- On September 28, Misha Ge was removed from the roster due to visa problems. On October 15, Kim Jin-seo was announced as his replacement.
- On October 16, Sara Hurtado / Adrià Díaz were removed from the roster. It was announced that the couple had split, because Hurtado had dissolved the partnership. On October 26, their replacement was announced as Laurence Fournier Beaudry / Nikolaj Sørensen.
- On November 6, Florent Amodio was removed from the roster due to an injury. No replacement was made.
- On November 11, Gabriella Papadakis / Guillaume Cizeron withdrew due to Papadakis not having fully recovered from her concussion. No replacement was made.

==== Rostelecom Cup ====
- On September 14, Adelina Sotnikova, Natalja Zabijako / Alexander Enbert, and Victoria Sinitsina / Nikita Katsalapov were added as a host picks.
- On October 16, Sara Hurtado / Adrià Díaz were removed from the roster. It was announced that the couple had split, because Hurtado had dissolved the partnership. On October 26, their replacement was announced as Viktoria Kavaliova / Yurii Bieliaiev.

==== NHK Trophy ====
- On September 9, Kana Muramoto / Chris Reed, Mariko Kihara, and Keiji Tanaka were added as host picks.
- On September 24, Joshua Farris was removed from the roster due to a concussion. On September 28, his replacement was announced as Grant Hochstein.
- On November 11, Gabriella Papadakis / Guillaume Cizeron withdrew due to Papadakis not having fully recovered from her concussion. On November 17, Penny Coomes / Nicholas Buckland were announced as their replacement.
- On November 20, Tatiana Volosozhar / Maxim Trankov withdrew due to an injury to Volosozhar. They were replaced by Amani Fancy / Christopher Boyadji. Ice dancers Alexandra Paul / Mitchell Islam also withdrew. On November 21, they were replaced by Anastasia Cannuscio / Colin McManus.
- On November 21, Jason Brown withdrew due to a back strain injury. On November 23, he was replaced by Brendan Kerry.
- On November 23, Maé-Bérénice Méité withdrew from the ladies' event.

== Medal summary ==
=== Medalists ===
Event	Discipline	Gold	Silver	Bronze
Skate America	Men	(United States) Max Aaron	(Japan) Shoma Uno	(United States) Jason Brown
Skate America	Ladies	(Russia) Evgenia Medvedeva	(United States) Gracie Gold	(Japan) Satoko Miyahara
Skate America	Pairs	(China) Sui Wenjing / Han Cong	(United States) Alexa Scimeca / Chris Knierim	(Canada) Julianne Séguin / Charlie Bilodeau
Skate America	Ice dancing	(United States) Madison Chock / Evan Bates	(Russia) Victoria Sinitsina / Nikita Katsalapov	(Canada) Piper Gilles / Paul Poirier

Event	Discipline	Gold	Silver	Bronze
Skate Canada	Men	(Canada) Patrick Chan	(Japan) Yuzuru Hanyu	(Japan) Daisuke Murakami
Skate Canada	Ladies	(United States) Ashley Wagner	(Russia) Elizaveta Tuktamysheva	(Japan) Yuka Nagai
Skate Canada	Pairs	(Canada) Meagan Duhamel / Eric Radford	(Russia) Evgenia Tarasova / Vladimir Morozov	(Canada) Kirsten Moore-Towers / Michael Marinaro
Skate Canada	Ice dancing	(Canada) Kaitlyn Weaver / Andrew Poje	(United States) Maia Shibutani / Alex Shibutani	(Russia) Ekaterina Bobrova / Dmitri Soloviev

Event	Discipline	Gold	Silver	Bronze
Cup of China	Men	(Spain) Javier Fernández	(China) Jin Boyang	(China) Yan Han
Cup of China	Ladies	(Japan) Mao Asada	(Japan) Rika Hongo	(Russia) Elena Radionova
Cup of China	Pairs	(Russia) Yuko Kavaguti / Alexander Smirnov	(China) Sui Wenjing / Han Cong	(China) Yu Xiaoyu / Jin Yang
Cup of China	Ice dancing	(Italy) Anna Cappellini / Luca Lanotte	(United States) Madison Chock / Evan Bates	(Russia) Elena Ilinykh / Ruslan Zhiganshin

Event	Discipline	Gold	Silver	Bronze
Trophée Bompard	Men	(Japan) Shoma Uno	(Russia) Maxim Kovtun	(Japan) Daisuke Murakami
Trophée Bompard	Ladies	(United States) Gracie Gold	(Russia) Yulia Lipnitskaya	(Italy) Roberta Rodeghiero
Trophée Bompard	Pairs	(Russia) Tatiana Volosozhar / Maxim Trankov	(France) Vanessa James / Morgan Ciprès	(Canada) Julianne Séguin / Charlie Bilodeau
Trophée Bompard	Ice dancing	(United States) Madison Hubbell / Zachary Donohue	(Canada) Piper Gilles / Paul Poirier	(Russia) Alexandra Stepanova / Ivan Bukin

Event	Discipline	Gold	Silver	Bronze
Rostelecom Cup	Men	(Spain) Javier Fernández	(Russia) Adian Pitkeev	(United States) Ross Miner
Rostelecom Cup	Ladies	(Russia) Elena Radionova	(Russia) Evgenia Medvedeva	(Russia) Adelina Sotnikova
Rostelecom Cup	Pairs	(Russia) Ksenia Stolbova / Fedor Klimov	(Russia) Yuko Kavaguti / Alexander Smirnov	(China) Peng Cheng / Zhang Hao
Rostelecom Cup	Ice dancing	(Canada) Kaitlyn Weaver / Andrew Poje	(Italy) Anna Cappellini / Luca Lanotte	(Russia) Victoria Sinitsina / Nikita Katsalapov

Event	Discipline	Gold	Silver	Bronze
NHK Trophy	Men	(Japan) Yuzuru Hanyu	(China) Jin Boyang	(Japan) Takahito Mura
NHK Trophy	Ladies	(Japan) Satoko Miyahara	(United States) Courtney Hicks	(Japan) Mao Asada
NHK Trophy	Pairs	(Canada) Meagan Duhamel / Eric Radford	(China) Yu Xiaoyu / Jin Yang	(United States) Alexa Scimeca / Chris Knierim
NHK Trophy	Ice dancing	(United States) Maia Shibutani / Alex Shibutani	(Russia) Ekaterina Bobrova / Dmitri Soloviev	(United States) Madison Hubbell / Zachary Donohue

Event	Discipline	Gold	Silver	Bronze
Grand Prix Final	Men	(Japan) Yuzuru Hanyu	(Spain) Javier Fernández	(Japan) Shoma Uno
Grand Prix Final	Ladies	(Russia) Evgenia Medvedeva	(Japan) Satoko Miyahara	(Russia) Elena Radionova
Grand Prix Final	Pairs	(Russia) Ksenia Stolbova / Fedor Klimov	(Canada) Meagan Duhamel / Eric Radford	(Russia) Yuko Kavaguti / Alexander Smirnov
Grand Prix Final	Ice dancing	(Canada) Kaitlyn Weaver / Andrew Poje	(United States) Madison Chock / Evan Bates	(Italy) Anna Cappellini / Luca Lanotte

=== Medal standings ===
Rank	Nation	Gold	Silver	Bronze	Total
1	Russia (RUS)	7	9	8	24
2	United States (USA)	6	6	4	16
3	Canada (CAN)	6	2	4	12
4	Japan (JPN)	5	4	7	16
5	Spain (ESP)	2	1	0	3
6	China (CHN)	1	4	3	8
7	Italy (ITA)	1	1	2	4
8	France (FRA)	0	1	0	1
Totals (8 entries)		28	28	28	84

== Qualification ==
At each event, skaters earned points toward qualification for the Grand Prix Final. Following the sixth event, the top six highest scoring skaters/teams advanced to the Final. The points earned per placement were as follows:

Placement	Points (Singles)	Points (Pairs/Dance)
1st	15	15
2nd	13	13
3rd	11	11
4th	9	9
5th	7	7
6th	5	5
7th	4	–
8th	3	–
9th	–	–
10th	–	–

There were originally seven tie-breakers in cases of a tie in overall points:

1. Highest placement at an event. If a skater placed 1st and 3rd, the tiebreaker is the 1st place, and that beats a skater who placed 2nd in both events.
2. Highest combined total scores in both events. If a skater earned 200 points at one event and 250 at a second, that skater would win in the second tie-break over a skater who earned 200 points at one event and 150 at another.
3. Participated in two events.
4. Highest combined scores in the free skating/free dancing portion of both events.
5. Highest individual score in the free skating/free dancing portion from one event.
6. Highest combined scores in the short program/short dance of both events.
7. Highest number of total participants at the events.

However, due to the cancellation of the free skating/dance at Trophée Éric Bompard, the International Skating Union revised the tie-breakers to the following:

1. Highest placement at an event. If a skater placed 1st and 3rd, the tiebreaker is the 1st place, and that beats a skater who placed 2nd in both events.
2. Highest combined scores in the short program/short dance of both events.
3. Participated in two events.
4. Highest number of total participants at the events.

If a tie remained, it was considered unbreakable and the tied skaters all advanced to the Grand Prix Final.

=== Qualification standings ===
Points	Men	Ladies	Pairs	Ice dance
30	(Spain) Javier Fernández		(Canada) Meagan Duhamel / Eric Radford	(Canada) Kaitlyn Weaver / Andrew Poje
28	(Japan) Yuzuru Hanyu (Japan) Shoma Uno	(United States) Gracie Gold (Russia) Evgenia Medvedeva	(Russia) Yuko Kavaguti / Alexander Smirnov (China) Sui Wenjing / Han Cong (withdrew)	(United States) Madison Chock / Evan Bates (Italy) Anna Cappellini / Luca Lanotte (United States) Maia Shibutani / Alex Shibutani
26	(China) Jin Boyang	(Japan) Satoko Miyahara (Japan) Mao Asada (Russia) Elena Radionova		(United States) Madison Hubbell / Zachary Donohue
24		(United States) Ashley Wagner	(Russia) Ksenia Stolbova / Fedor Klimov (United States) Alexa Scimeca / Chris Knierim (China) Yu Xiaoyu / Jin Yang	(Russia) Ekaterina Bobrova / Dmitri Soloviev (Russia) Victoria Sinitsina / Nikita Katsalapov (Canada) Piper Gilles / Paul Poirier
22	(Canada) Patrick Chan (Japan) Daisuke Murakami		(Canada) Julianne Séguin / Charlie Bilodeau	
20	(China) Yan Han	(Japan) Rika Hongo (Russia) Elizaveta Tuktamysheva	(China) Peng Cheng / Zhang Hao (called up)	(Russia) Alexandra Stepanova / Ivan Bukin
19	(United States) Max Aaron			
18	(Russia) Adian Pitkeev (United States) Adam Rippon (United States) Grant Hochstein	(United States) Courtney Hicks (Russia) Yulia Lipnitskaya (Japan) Kanako Murakami	(France) Vanessa James / Morgan Ciprès	(Russia) Elena Ilinykh / Ruslan Zhiganshin (Italy) Charlène Guignard / Marco Fabbri
17				
16			(China) Wang Xuehan / Wang Lei (Russia) Vera Bazarova / Andrei Deputat	(United Kingdom) Penny Coomes / Nicholas Buckland
15	(United States) Ross Miner	(Italy) Roberta Rodeghiero	(Russia) Tatiana Volosozhar / Maxim Trankov	
14		(Japan) Yuka Nagai (United States) Polina Edmunds (United States) Karen Chen	(United States) Marissa Castelli / Mervin Tran (United States) Tarah Kayne / Daniel O'Shea	
13	(Russia) Maxim Kovtun	(Kazakhstan) Elizabet Tursynbaeva	(Russia) Evgenia Tarasova / Vladimir Morozov	
12	(Russia) Konstantin Menshov (Russia) Sergei Voronov	(Canada) Gabrielle Daleman		(United States) Anastasia Cannuscio / Colin McManus
11	(Japan) Takahito Mura (United States) Jason Brown (Canada) Nam Nguyen	(Russia) Adelina Sotnikova	(Canada) Kirsten Moore-Towers / Michael Marinaro	
10	(Russia) Alexander Petrov			(Russia) Anna Yanovskaya / Sergey Mozgov
9	(Kazakhstan) Denis Ten	(Russia) Anna Pogorilaya		(United States) Kaitlin Hawayek / Jean-Luc Baker (Slovakia) Federica Testa / Lukáš Csölley
8		(Slovakia) Nicole Rajičová		
7	(Russia) Mikhail Kolyada (Japan) Keiji Tanaka (Czech Republic) Michal Březina (United States) Richard Dornbush	(United States) Mirai Nagasu	(Canada) Liubov Ilyushechkina / Dylan Moscovitch (Russia) Kristina Astakhova / Alexei Rogonov (Italy) Nicole Della Monica / Matteo Guarise (Russia) Natalja Zabijako / Alexander Enbert	(Denmark) Laurence Fournier Beaudry / Nikolaj Sørensen (Russia) Ksenia Monko / Kirill Khaliavin (China) Zhao Yue / Zheng Xun
6		(Russia) Alena Leonova		
5	(Philippines) Michael Christian Martinez	(Canada) Alaine Chartrand (Canada) Kaetlyn Osmond	(Austria) Miriam Ziegler / Severin Kiefer (Germany) Mari Vartmann / Ruben Blommaert (Italy) Valentina Marchei / Ondřej Hotárek	(China) Wang Shiyue / Liu Xinyu (Canada) Alexandra Paul / Mitchell Islam (South Korea) Rebeka Kim / Kirill Minov
4	(United States) Timothy Dolensky	(China) Li Zijun (Latvia) Angelīna Kučvaļska		
3	(Italy) Ivan Righini (Australia) Brendan Kerry (China) Wang Yi (Uzbekistan) Misha Ge	(South Korea) Park So-youn (United States) Angela Wang (United States) Mariah Bell		

=== Qualifiers ===
Due to the cancellation of the free skating/dance at the Trophée Éric Bompard, the International Skating Union announced an exception to the qualification criteria. For the skaters who placed seventh in qualifying for the Grand Prix Final, if they competed at Trophée Bompard, they would receive an invite to the Final.

	Men	Ladies	Pairs	Ice dancing
1	(Spain) Javier Fernández	(United States) Gracie Gold	(Canada) Meagan Duhamel / Eric Radford	(Canada) Kaitlyn Weaver / Andrew Poje
2	(Japan) Yuzuru Hanyu	(Russia) Evgenia Medvedeva	(Russia) Yuko Kavaguti / Alexander Smirnov	(United States) Madison Chock / Evan Bates
3	(Japan) Shoma Uno	(Japan) Satoko Miyahara	(China) ~~Sui Wenjing / Han Cong~~ (withdrew)	(Italy) Anna Cappellini / Luca Lanotte
4	(China) Jin Boyang	(Japan) Mao Asada	(Russia) Ksenia Stolbova / Fedor Klimov	(United States) Maia Shibutani / Alex Shibutani
5	(Canada) Patrick Chan	(Russia) Elena Radionova	(United States) Alexa Scimeca / Chris Knierim	(United States) Madison Hubbell / Zachary Donohue
6	(Japan) Daisuke Murakami	(United States) Ashley Wagner	(China) Yu Xiaoyu / Jin Yang	(Russia) Ekaterina Bobrova / Dmitri Soloviev
7	—N/a	—N/a	(Canada) Julianne Séguin / Charlie Bilodeau	—N/a
Alternates
1st	(China) Yan Han	(Japan) Rika Hongo	(China) Peng Cheng / Zhang Hao (called up)	(Russia) Victoria Sinitsina / Nikita Katsalapov
2nd	(United States) Max Aaron	(Russia) Elizaveta Tuktamysheva	(France) Vanessa James / Morgan Ciprès	(Canada) Piper Gilles / Paul Poirier
3rd	(Russia) Adian Pitkeev	(United States) Courtney Hicks	—N/a	(Russia) Alexandra Stepanova / Ivan Bukin

== Top Grand Prix scores ==
=== Men ===
==== Total score ====
Rank	Name	Nation	Score	Event
1	Yuzuru Hanyu	Japan	330.43	2015–16 Grand Prix Final
2	Javier Fernández	Spain	292.95	2015–16 Grand Prix Final
3	Shoma Uno	Japan	276.79	2015–16 Grand Prix Final
4	Patrick Chan	Canada	271.14	2015 Skate Canada
5	Jin Boyang	China	266.43	2015 NHK Trophy
6	Max Aaron	United States	258.95	2015 Skate America
7	Daisuke Murakami	Japan	252.25	2015 Skate Canada
8	Adian Pitkeev	Russia	250.47	2015 Rostelecom Cup
9	Ross Miner	United States	248.92	2015 Rostelecom Cup
10	Adam Rippon	United States	248.63	2015 Rostelecom Cup

==== Short program ====
Rank	Name	Nation	Score	Event
1	Yuzuru Hanyu	Japan	110.95	2015–16 Grand Prix Final
2	Jin Boyang	China	95.64	2015 NHK Trophy
3	Javier Fernández	Spain	93.19	2015 Cup of China
4	Shoma Uno	Japan	89.56	2015 Trophée Éric Bompard
5	Takahito Mura	Japan	88.29	2015 NHK Trophy
6	Adian Pitkeev	Russia	87.54	2015 Rostelecom Cup
7	Maxim Kovtun	Russia	86.82	2015 Trophée Éric Bompard
8	Max Aaron	United States	86.67	2015 Skate America
9	Yan Han	China	86.53	2015 Skate America
10	Konstantin Menshov	Russia	86.15	2015 Skate America

==== Free program ====
Rank	Name	Nation	Score	Event
1	Yuzuru Hanyu	Japan	219.48	2015–16 Grand Prix Final
2	Javier Fernández	Spain	201.43	2015–16 Grand Prix Final
3	Patrick Chan	Canada	192.84	2015–16 Grand Prix Final
4	Shoma Uno	Japan	190.32	2015–16 Grand Prix Final
5	Jin Boyang	China	176.50	2015–16 Grand Prix Final
6	Max Aaron	United States	172.28	2015 Skate America
7	Daisuke Murakami	Japan	171.37	2015 Skate Canada
8	Adam Rippon	United States	169.86	2015 Rostelecom Cup
9	Mikhail Kolyada	Russia	168.33	2015 Rostelecom Cup
10	Ross Miner	United States	163.56	2015 Rostelecom Cup

=== Ladies ===
==== Total score ====
Rank	Name	Nation	Score	Event
1	Evgenia Medvedeva	Russia	222.54	2015–16 Grand Prix Final
2	Elena Radionova	Russia	211.32	2015 Rostelecom Cup
3	Satoko Miyahara	Japan	208.85	2015–16 Grand Prix Final
4	Gracie Gold	United States	202.80	2015 Skate America
5	Ashley Wagner	United States	202.52	2015 Skate Canada
6	Mao Asada	Japan	197.48	2015 Cup of China
7	Rika Hongo	Japan	195.76	2015 Cup of China
8	Elizaveta Tuktamysheva	Russia	188.99	2015 Skate Canada
9	Anna Pogorilaya	Russia	184.16	2015 Cup of China
10	Polina Edmunds	United States	183.20	2015 Rostelecom Cup

==== Short program ====
Rank	Name	Nation	Score	Event
1	Evgenia Medvedeva	Russia	74.58	2015–16 Grand Prix Final
2	Gracie Gold	United States	73.32	2015 Trophée Éric Bompard
3	Elena Radionova	Russia	71.79	2015 Rostelecom Cup
4	Mao Asada	Japan	71.73	2015 Cup of China
5	Ashley Wagner	United States	70.73	2015 Skate Canada
6	Satoko Miyahara	Japan	69.53	2015 NHK Trophy
7	Alaine Chartrand	Canada	67.38	2015 Rostelecom Cup
8	Rika Hongo	Japan	65.79	2015 Cup of China
9	Yulia Lipnitskaya	Russia	65.63	2015 Trophée Éric Bompard
10	Courtney Hicks	United States	65.60	2015 NHK Trophy

==== Free program ====
Rank	Name	Nation	Score	Event
1	Evgenia Medvedeva	Russia	147.96	2015–16 Grand Prix Final
2	Satoko Miyahara	Japan	140.09	2015–16 Grand Prix Final
3	Ashley Wagner	United States	139.77	2015–16 Grand Prix Final
4	Elena Radionova	Russia	139.53	2015 Rostelecom Cup
5	Gracie Gold	United States	137.41	2015 Skate America
6	Elizaveta Tuktamysheva	Russia	133.62	2015 Skate Canada
7	Rika Hongo	Japan	129.97	2015 Cup of China
8	Mao Asada	Japan	125.75	2015 Cup of China
9	Anna Pogorilaya	Russia	122.69	2015 Cup of China
10	Elizabet Tursynbaeva	Kazakhstan	119.30	2015 Skate America

=== Pairs ===
==== Total score ====
Rank	Name	Nation	Score	Event
1	Ksenia Stolbova / Fedor Klimov	Russia	229.44	2015–16 Grand Prix Final
2	Meagan Duhamel / Eric Radford	Canada	216.67	2015–16 Grand Prix Final
3	Yuko Kavaguti / Alexander Smirnov	Russia	216.00	2015 Cup of China
4	Sui Wenjing / Han Cong	China	215.62	2015 Cup of China
5	Julianne Séguin / Charlie Bilodeau	Canada	200.98	2015–16 Grand Prix Final
6	Yu Xiaoyu / Jin Yang	China	197.75	2015 Cup of China
7	Peng Cheng / Zhang Hao	China	193.04	2015 Rostelecom Cup
8	Alexa Scimeca / Chris Knierim	United States	191.97	2015 Skate America
9	Evgenia Tarasova / Vladimir Morozov	Russia	191.19	2015 Skate Canada
10	Wang Xuehan / Wang Lei	China	186.76	2015 Cup of China

==== Short program ====
Rank	Name	Nation	Score	Event
1	Ksenia Stolbova / Fedor Klimov	Russia	75.45	2015 Rostelecom Cup
2	Tatiana Volosozhar / Maxim Trankov	Russia	74.50	2015 Trophée Éric Bompard
3	Sui Wenjing / Han Cong	China	74.40	2015 Cup of China
4	Yuko Kavaguti / Alexander Smirnov	Russia	73.64	2015–16 Grand Prix Final
5	Meagan Duhamel / Eric Radford	Canada	72.74	2015–16 Grand Prix Final
6	Julianne Séguin / Charlie Bilodeau	Canada	71.16	2015–16 Grand Prix Final
7	Yu Xiaoyu / Jin Yang	China	70.06	2015 Cup of China
8	Alexa Scimeca / Chris Knierim	United States	69.69	2015 Skate America
9	Wang Xuehan / Wang Lei	China	69.36	2015 Cup of China
10	Peng Cheng / Zhang Hao	China	68.10	2015 Rostelecom Cup

==== Free program ====
Rank	Name	Nation	Score	Event
1	Ksenia Stolbova / Fedor Klimov	Russia	154.60	2015–16 Grand Prix Final
2	Meagan Duhamel / Eric Radford	Canada	143.93	2015–16 Grand Prix Final
3	Yuko Kavaguti / Alexander Smirnov	Russia	143.55	2015 Cup of China
4	Sui Wenjing / Han Cong	China	141.22	2015 Cup of China
5	Julianne Séguin / Charlie Bilodeau	Canada	129.82	2015–16 Grand Prix Final
6	Yu Xiaoyu / Jin Yang	China	127.69	2015 Cup of China
7	Evgenia Tarasova / Vladimir Morozov	Russia	127.19	2015 Skate Canada
8	Peng Cheng / Zhang Hao	China	124.94	2015 Rostelecom Cup
9	Tarah Kayne / Daniel O'Shea	United States	122.45	2015 Rostelecom Cup
10	Alexa Scimeca / Chris Knierim	United States	122.28	2015 Skate America

=== Ice dance ===
==== Total score ====
Rank	Name	Nation	Score	Event
1	Kaitlyn Weaver / Andrew Poje	Canada	182.66	2015–16 Grand Prix Final
2	Madison Chock / Evan Bates	United States	177.55	2015–16 Grand Prix Final
3	Anna Cappellini / Luca Lanotte	Italy	176.37	2015–16 Grand Prix Final
4	Maia Shibutani / Alex Shibutani	United States	174.92	2015–16 Grand Prix Final
5	Ekaterina Bobrova / Dmitri Soloviev	Russia	169.33	2015 NHK Trophy
6	Madison Hubbell / Zachary Donohue	United States	167.49	2015 NHK Trophy
7	Victoria Sinitsina / Nikita Katsalapov	Russia	167.40	2015 Rostelecom Cup
8	Alexandra Stepanova / Ivan Bukin	Russia	160.64	2015 NHK Trophy
9	Elena Ilinykh / Ruslan Zhiganshin	Russia	159.00	2015 Cup of China
10	Piper Gilles / Paul Poirier	Canada	157.58	2015 Skate America

==== Short dance ====
Rank	Name	Nation	Score	Event
1	Kaitlyn Weaver / Andrew Poje	Canada	72.75	2015–16 Grand Prix Final
2	Madison Chock / Evan Bates	United States	71.64	2015–16 Grand Prix Final
3	Anna Cappellini / Luca Lanotte	Italy	70.14	2015–16 Grand Prix Final
4	Maia Shibutani / Alex Shibutani	United States	69.11	2015–16 Grand Prix Final
5	Madison Hubbell / Zachary Donohue	United States	66.57	2015 NHK Trophy
6	Ekaterina Bobrova / Dmitri Soloviev	Russia	66.19	2015 NHK Trophy
7	Piper Gilles / Paul Poirier	Canada	63.94	2015 Trophée Éric Bompard
7	Victoria Sinitsina / Nikita Katsalapov	Russia	63.63	2015 Rostelecom Cup
8	Elena Ilinykh / Ruslan Zhiganshin	Russia	63.54	2015 Cup of China
9	Alexandra Stepanova / Ivan Bukin	Russia	61.96	2015 NHK Trophy
10	Charlène Guignard / Marco Fabbri	Italy	61.29	2015 Skate Canada

==== Free dance ====
Rank	Name	Nation	Score	Event
1	Kaitlyn Weaver / Andrew Poje	Canada	109.91	2015–16 Grand Prix Final
2	Anna Cappellini / Luca Lanotte	Italy	106.91	2015 Cup of China
3	Maia Shibutani / Alex Shibutani	United States	106.35	2015 NHK Trophy
4	Madison Chock / Evan Bates	United States	105.91	2015–16 Grand Prix Final
5	Victoria Sinitsina / Nikita Katsalapov	Russia	103.77	2015 Rostelecom Cup
6	Ekaterina Bobrova / Dmitri Soloviev	Russia	103.14	2015 NHK Trophy
7	Madison Hubbell / Zachary Donohue	United States	100.92	2015 NHK Trophy
8	Alexandra Stepanova / Ivan Bukin	Russia	98.68	2015 NHK Trophy
9	Elena Ilinykh / Ruslan Zhiganshin	Russia	98.55	2015 Rostelecom Cup
10	Piper Gilles / Paul Poirier	Canada	96.25	2015 Skate America
