= 2015 Rostelecom Cup =

- Type: Grand Prix
- Date: November 20 – 22
- Season: 2015–16
- Location: Moscow
- Host: Figure Skating Federation of Russia
- Venue: Luzhniki Small Sports Arena

Champions
- Men's singles: (Spain) Javier Fernández
- Ladies' singles: (Russia) Elena Radionova
- Pairs: (Russia) Ksenia Stolbova / Fedor Klimov
- Ice dance: (Canada) Kaitlyn Weaver / Andrew Poje
- Previous: 2014 Rostelecom Cup
- Next: 2016 Rostelecom Cup
- Previous Grand Prix: 2015 Trophée Éric Bompard
- Next Grand Prix: 2015 NHK Trophy

The 2015 Rostelecom Cup was the fifth event of six in the 2015–16 ISU Grand Prix of Figure Skating, a senior-level international invitational competition series. It was held at the Luzhniki Small Sports Arena in Moscow on November 20–22. Medals were awarded in the disciplines of men's singles, ladies' singles, pair skating, and ice dancing. Skaters earned points toward qualifying for the 2015–16 Grand Prix Final.

== Entries ==
Country	Men	Ladies	Pairs	Ice dancing
Belarus				Viktoria Kavaliova / Yurii Bieliaiev
Canada	Nam Nguyen	Alaine Chartrand	Hayleigh Bell / Rudi Swiegers; Kirsten Moore-Towers / Michael Marinaro	Kaitlyn Weaver / Andrew Poje
China			Peng Cheng / Zhang Hao	
Germany	Peter Liebers			
Israel	Alexei Bychenko			
Italy	Ivan Righini	Roberta Rodeghiero	Valentina Marchei / Ondřej Hotárek	Anna Cappellini / Luca Lanotte; Charlène Guignard / Marco Fabbri
Japan	Takahiko Kozuka	Rika Hongo; Riona Kato; Yuka Nagai		
South Korea				Rebeka Kim / Kirill Minov
Russia	Mikhail Kolyada; Adian Pitkeev; Sergei Voronov	Evgenia Medvedeva; Elena Radionova; Adelina Sotnikova	Ksenia Stolbova / Fedor Klimov; Yuko Kavaguti / Alexander Smirnov; Natalja Zabijako / Alexander Enbert	Elena Ilinykh / Ruslan Zhiganshin; Ksenia Monko / Kirill Khaliavin; Victoria Sinitsina / Nikita Katsalapov
Spain	Javier Fernández			
Slovenia		Daša Grm		
Sweden		Joshi Helgesson		
United States	Ross Miner; Adam Rippon	Polina Edmunds; Hannah Miller	Tarah Kayne / Daniel O'Shea	

=== Changes to initial lineup ===
- On September 14, Adelina Sotnikova, Natalja Zabijako / Alexander Enbert, and Victoria Sinitsina / Nikita Katsalapov were added as a host picks.
- On October 16, Sara Hurtado / Adrià Díaz were removed from the roster. It was announced that the couple had split. On October 26, their replacement was announced as Viktoria Kavaliova / Yurii Bieliaiev.

== Results ==
=== Men ===
Rank	Name	Nation	Total points	SP		FS	
1	Javier Fernández	Spain	271.43	2	86.99	1	184.44
2	Adian Pitkeev	Russia	250.47	1	87.54	5	162.93
3	Ross Miner	United States	248.92	3	85.36	4	163.56
4	Adam Rippon	United States	248.63	6	78.77	2	169.86
5	Mikhail Kolyada	Russia	247.97	5	79.64	3	168.33
6	Sergei Voronov	Russia	244.60	4	84.17	7	160.43
7	Nam Nguyen	Canada	231.67	7	70.78	6	160.89
8	Ivan Righini	Italy	204.16	9	68.90	8	135.26
9	Takahiko Kozuka	Japan	195.48	8	69.61	9	125.87
10	Alexei Bychenko	Israel	186.00	10	67.46	10	118.54
WD	Peter Liebers	Germany	withdrew from competition				

=== Ladies ===
Rank	Name	Nation	Total points	SP		FS	
1	Elena Radionova	Russia	211.32	1	71.79	2	139.53
2	Evgenia Medvedeva	Russia	206.76	3	67.03	1	139.73
3	Adelina Sotnikova	Russia	185.11	4	65.48	3	119.63
4	Polina Edmunds	United States	183.20	5	65.29	4	117.91
5	Rika Hongo	Japan	179.12	6	63.45	5	115.67
6	Alaine Chartrand	Canada	173.42	2	67.38	7	106.04
7	Roberta Rodeghiero	Italy	162.72	7	56.85	8	105.87
8	Yuka Nagai	Japan	159.62	9	53.19	6	106.43
9	Joshi Helgesson	Sweden	157.54	8	56.85	10	100.69
10	Riona Kato	Japan	155.56	10	50.26	9	105.30
11	Hannah Miller	United States	145.21	11	47.98	11	97.23
12	Daša Grm	Slovenia	137.56	12	44.72	12	92.84

=== Pairs ===
Rank	Name	Nation	Total points	SP		FS	
1	Ksenia Stolbova / Fedor Klimov	Russia	214.70	1	75.45	1	139.25
2	Yuko Kavaguti / Alexander Smirnov	Russia	208.02	2	71.70	2	136.32
3	Peng Cheng / Zhang Hao	China	193.04	3	68.10	3	124.94
4	Tarah Kayne / Daniel O'Shea	United States	181.23	6	58.78	4	122.45
5	Natalja Zabijako / Alexander Enbert	Russia	180.56	5	60.77	5	119.79
6	Valentina Marchei / Ondřej Hotárek	Italy	178.19	4	62.43	6	115.76
7	Kirsten Moore-Towers / Michael Marinaro	Canada	158.75	7	51.97	7	106.78
8	Hayleigh Bell / Rudi Swiegers	Canada	130.46	8	46.53	8	83.93

=== Ice dancing ===
Rank	Name	Nation	Total points	SD		FD	
1	Kaitlyn Weaver / Andrew Poje	Canada	173.58	1	69.49	1	104.09
2	Anna Cappellini / Luca Lanotte	Italy	171.61	2	67.82	2	103.79
3	Victoria Sinitsina / Nikita Katsalapov	Russia	167.40	3	63.63	3	103.77
4	Charlène Guignard / Marco Fabbri	Italy	153.54	4	60.58	5	92.96
5	Elena Ilinykh / Ruslan Zhiganshin	Russia	153.01	6	54.46	4	98.55
6	Rebeka Kim / Kirill Minov	South Korea	134.95	7	51.83	6	83.12
7	Viktoria Kavaliova / Yurii Bieliaiev	Belarus	110.32	8	41.60	7	68.72
WD	Ksenia Monko / Kirill Khaliavin	Russia	withdrew	5	59.03	withdrew from competition	
