= 2015 Trophée Éric Bompard =

International figure skating competition

- Type: Grand Prix competition
- Date: 13 November 2015
- Season: 2015–16
- Location: Bordeaux, France
- Host: French Federation of Ice Sports
- Venue: Patinoire de Mériadeck

Champions
- Men's singles: (Japan) Shoma Uno
- Women's singles: (United States) Gracie Gold
- Pairs: (Russia) Tatiana Volosozhar and Maxim Trankov
- Ice dance: (United States) Madison Hubbell and Zachary Donahue
- Previous: 2014 Trophée Éric Bompard
- Next: 2016 Trophée de France
- Previous Grand Prix: 2015 Cup of China
- Next Grand Prix: 2015 Rostelecom Cup

The 2015 Trophée Éric Bompard was a figure skating competition sanctioned by the International Skating Union (ISU), organized and hosted by the French Federation of Ice Sports (French: Fédération française des sports de glace), and the fourth event of the 2015–16 ISU Grand Prix of Figure Skating series. It was held at the Patinoire de Mériadeck in Bordeaux, France, on 13 November 2015. Medals were awarded in men's singles, women's singles, pair skating, and ice dance. Skaters earned points based on their results, and the top skaters or teams in each discipline at the end of the season were then invited to compete at the 2015–16 Grand Prix Final in Barcelona, Spain.

The competition was cancelled after the first day following the November 2015 Paris terrorist attacks. The ISU later announced that the short program results would be considered the final results for the competition, and any prize money and qualifying points for the Grand Prix Final were distributed on that basis. Shoma Uno of Japan won the men's event, Gracie Gold of the United States won the women's event, Tatiana Volosozhar and Maxim Trankov of Russia won the pairs event, and Madison Hubbell and Zachary Donohue of the United States won the ice dance event.

== Background ==
The ISU Grand Prix of Figure Skating is a series of seven events sanctioned by the International Skating Union (ISU) and held during the autumn: six qualifying events and the Grand Prix Final. This allows skaters to perfect their programs earlier in the season, as well as compete against the same skaters they will later encounter at the World Championships. The series also provides the viewing public with more televised skating. Skaters earn points based on their results in their respective competitions, and the top skaters or teams in each discipline are invited to compete at the Grand Prix Final.

The 2015 Trophée Éric Bompard was the fourth of the six qualifying Grand Prix events. It was held at the Patinoire de Mériadeck in Bordeaux, France, on 13 November 2015. The cashmere manufacturer Éric Bompard had been the principal sponsor of the Grand Prix de France since 2003 and the competition bore the company's name.

== Changes to preliminary assignments ==
The International Skating Union published the initial list of entrants on 15 June 2015.

| Discipline | Withdrew | | Added | | Notes | Ref. |
| Discipline | Date | Skater(s) | Date | Skater(s) | Notes | Ref. |
|---|---|---|---|---|---|---|
| Women | 14 August | (Finland); Kiira Korpi | 21 August | (Italy); Roberta Rodeghiero | Retirement | |
| Men | —N/a | | 15 September | (France); Chafik Besseghier | Host pick | |
| Women | —N/a | | 23 September | (Australia); Brooklee Han | —N/a | |
| Pairs | —N/a | | 23 September | (Austria); Miriam Ziegler; Severin Kiefer | —N/a | |
| Ice dance | —N/a | | 23 September | (Spain); Sara Hurtado; Adrià Díaz | —N/a | |
| Ice dance | —N/a | | 23 September | (Turkey); Alisa Agafonova; Alper Uçar | —N/a | |
| Men | 7 October | (Uzbekistan); Misha Ge | 15 October | (South Korea); Kim Jin-seo | Unable to secure the necessary visa | |
| Ice dance | 16 October | (Spain); Sara Hurtado; Adrià Díaz | 26 October | (Denmark); Laurence Fournier Beaudry; Nikolaj Sørensen | Retirement (Hurtado) | |
| Men | 6 November | (France); Florent Amodio | —N/a | | Injury | |
| Ice dance | 11 November | (France); Gabriella Papadakis; Guillaume Cizeron | —N/a | | Recovery from concussion (Papadakis) | |

== Required performance elements ==
=== Single skating ===
Men and women competing in single skating performed their short programs on 13 November. Lasting no more than 2 minutes 50 seconds, the short program had to include the following elements:

For men: one double or triple Axel; one triple or quadruple jump; one jump combination consisting of a double jump and a triple jump, two triple jumps, or a quadruple jump and a double jump or triple jump; one flying spin; one camel spin or sit spin with a change of foot; one spin combination with a change of foot; and a step sequence using the full ice surface.

For women: one double or triple Axel; one triple jump; one jump combination consisting of a double jump and a triple jump, or two triple jumps; one flying spin; one layback spin or sideways leaning spin; one spin combination with a change of foot; and one step sequence using the full ice surface.

Men and women would have performed their free skates on 14 November had the competition not been cancelled.

=== Pair skating ===
Couples competing in pair skating performed their short programs on 13 November. Lasting no more than 2 minutes 50 seconds, it had to include the following elements: one hip lift, one double or triple twist lift, one double or triple throw jump, one double or triple solo jump, one solo spin combination with a change of foot, one death spiral, and a step sequence using the full ice surface.

Couples would have performed their free skates on 14 November had the competition not been cancelled.

=== Ice dance ===
Couples competing in ice dance performed their short dance on 13 November. Lasting no more than 2 minutes 50 seconds, the required rhythms of the short dance this season were the waltz, plus any of the following: foxtrot, march, or polka. The required pattern dance element was the Waltz Rhythm. The rhythm dance had to include the following elements: two sections of the Ravensburger Waltz, one dance lift, one set of sequential twizzles, and one step sequence.

Couples would have performed their free dances on 14 November had the competition not been cancelled.

== Judging ==
For the 2015–2016 season, all of the technical elements in any figure skating performance – such as jumps, spins, and lifts – were assigned a predetermined base point value, and were then scored by a panel of nine judges on a scale from -3 to +3 based on their quality of execution. The judging panel's Grade of Execution (GOE) was determined by calculating the trimmed mean (that is, an average after deleting the highest and lowest scores), and this GOE was added to the base value to come up with the final score for each element. The panel's scores for all elements were added together to generate a total element score. At the same time, judges evaluated each performance based on five program components – skating skills, transitions/footwork, performance/execution, choreography/composition, and interpretation of the music/timing – and assigned a score from .25 to 10 in .25 point increments. The judging panel's final score for each program component was also determined by calculating the trimmed mean. Those scores were then multiplied by the factor shown on the following chart; the results were added together to generate a total program component score.

Program component factoring
| Discipline | Short program or Short dance |
|---|---|
| Men | 1.00 |
| Women | 0.80 |
| Pairs | 0.80 |
| Ice dance | 0.80 |

Deductions were applied for certain violations like time infractions, stops and restarts, or falls. The total element score and total program component score were added together, minus any deductions, to generate a final performance score for each skater or team.

== November 2015 Paris attacks ==
A series of coordinated Islamist terrorist attacks took place on Friday, 13 November 2015 in Paris and the northern suburb, Saint-Denis. Three suicide bombers struck outside the Stade de France in Saint-Denis during an international soccer match after failing to gain entry to the stadium. Another group of attackers then fired on crowded cafés and restaurants in Paris, one also detonating an explosive and killing himself in the process. A third group carried out another mass shooting and took hostages at an Eagles of Death Metal concert at the Bataclan theater, leading to a stand-off with police. The attackers were either shot or detonated suicide vests when police raided the theater. France had already been on high alert since the January 2015 attacks at the Charlie Hebdo offices and a Jewish supermarket in Paris that killed 17 people. 137 people were killed, including 90 at the Bataclan, and another 416 people were injured. The Islamic State claimed responsibility for the attacks, saying that it was retaliation for French airstrikes on Islamic State targets in Syria and Iraq. François Hollande, the president of France, decried the attacks as an "act of war" by the Islamic State. The attacks had been planned in Syria and organized by a terror cell based in Belgium. In response to the attacks, a three-month state of emergency was declared across the country.

The 2015 Trophée Éric Bompard was cancelled the day after the attacks. The French Federation of Ice Sports had hoped to be able to continue the competition, but Bernard Cazeneuve, Minister of the Interior, and Alain Juppé, mayor of Bordeaux, informed them that the competition must be cancelled due to France being in a state of emergency. The short programs had been completed on 13 November before the attacks began, but the free skating had been scheduled to be held the next day. American skater Gracie Gold described feeling anxious after first hearing of the attacks and seeing that one of the targets had been a soccer stadium. Anxiety gave way to sadness and numbness the next day when the skaters learned that the competition had been cancelled. "This is terrible," Gold wrote in her autobiography. "I won only because more than a hundred people died and hundreds of others were injured." On 23 November, the International Skating Union announced that the results of the short programs would be officially considered the final results for the competition, and the prize money and qualifying points for the Grand Prix Final were distributed on that basis.

Éric Bompard ended its sponsorship of the Grand Prix de France in 2016, citing the cancellation of the 2015 competition as a factor. Losses from the 2014 Trophée Éric Bompard, which had been relocated from Paris to Bordeaux while the Palais Omnisports de Paris-Bercy was undergoing renovations, diminishing television exposure, and the failure of the French Federation of Ice Sports to respond to the company's inquiries also influenced the decision.

== Medalists ==
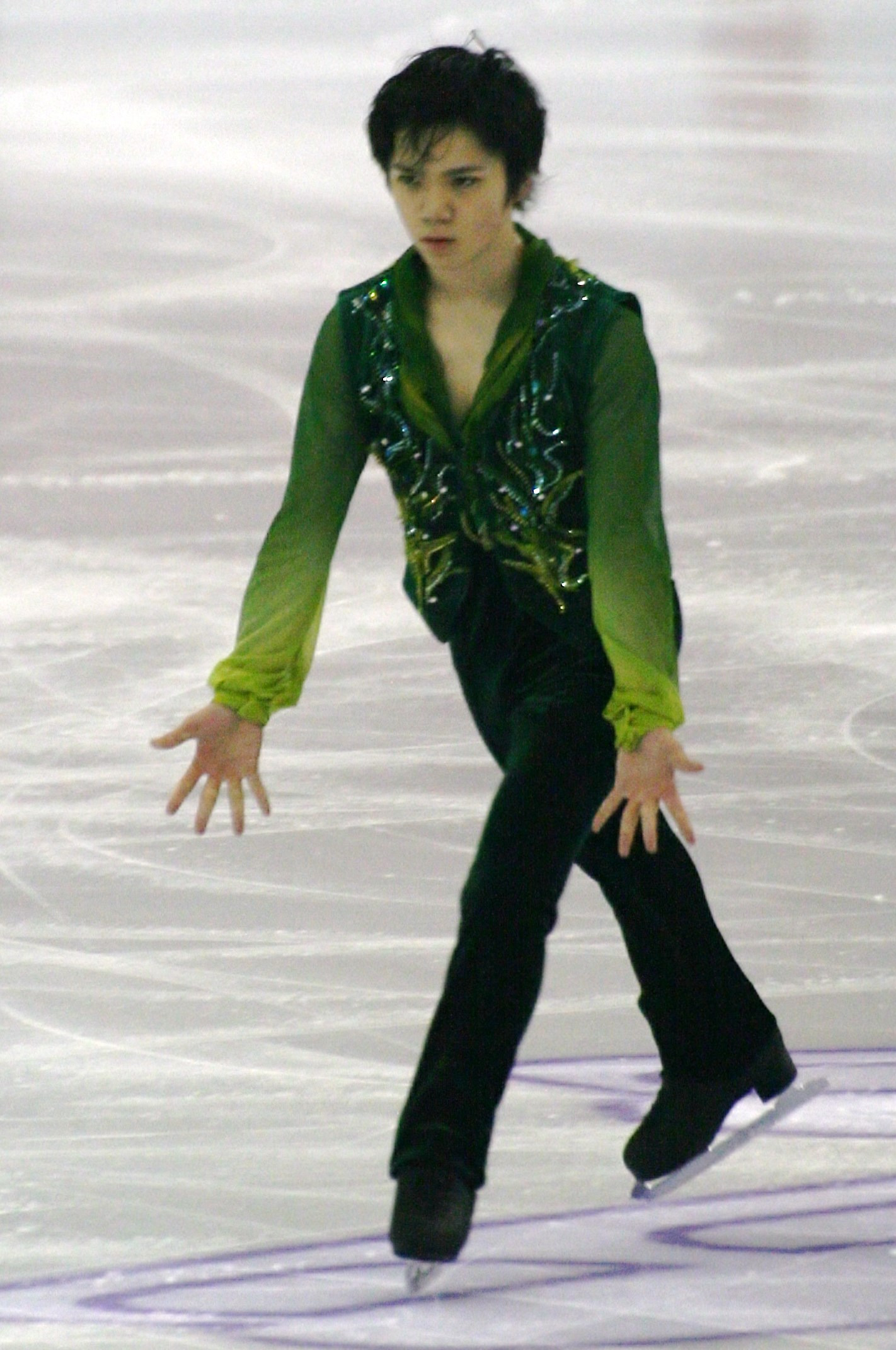
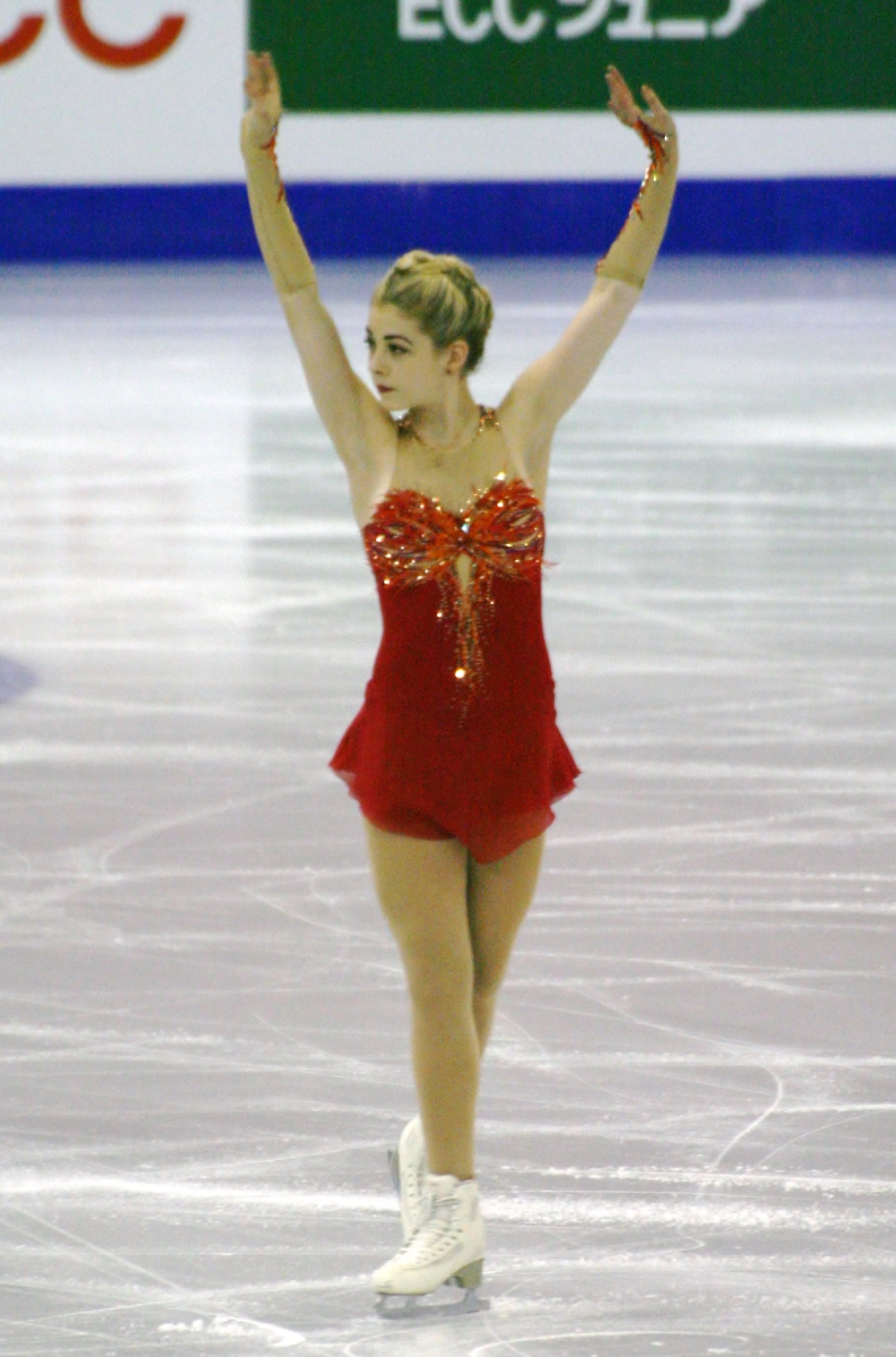
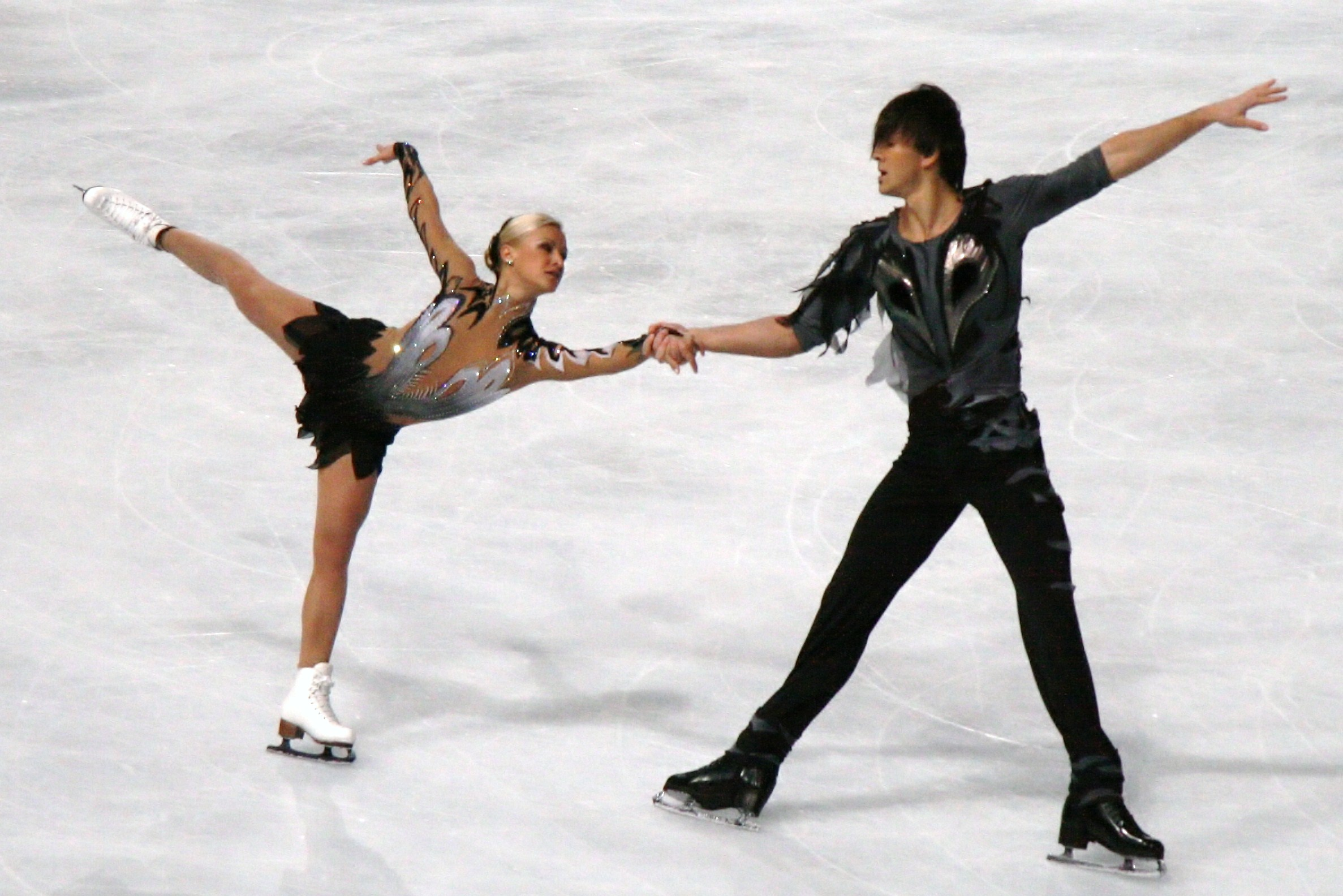
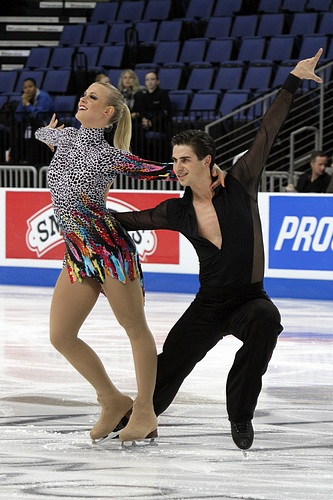
From left to right: The 2015 Trophée Éric Bompard champions: Shoma Uno of Japan (men's singles); Gracie Gold of the United States (women's singles); Tatiana Volosozhar and Maxim Trankov of Russia (pair skating); and Madison Hubbell and Zachary Donohue of the United States (ice dance)

Medal recipients
| Discipline | Gold | Silver | Bronze |
|---|---|---|---|
| Men | (Japan); Shoma Uno | (Russia); Maxim Kovtun | (Japan); Daisuke Murakami |
| Women | (United States); Gracie Gold | (Russia); Yulia Lipnitskaya | (Italy); Roberta Rodeghiero |
| Pairs | (Russia); Tatiana Volosozhar; Maxim Trankov | (France); Vanessa James; Morgan Ciprès | (Canada); Julianne Séguin; Charlie Bilodeau |
| Ice dance | (United States); Madison Hubbell; Zachary Donohue | (Canada); Piper Gilles; Paul Poirier | (Russia); Alexandra Stepanova; Ivan Bukin |

== Results ==
=== Men's singles ===
Men's results
| Rank | Skater | Nation | SP |
|---|---|---|---|
| 1st place, gold medalist(s) | Shoma Uno | Japan | 89.56 |
| 2nd place, silver medalist(s) | Maxim Kovtun | Russia | 86.82 |
| 3rd place, bronze medalist(s) | Daisuke Murakami | Japan | 80.24 |
| 4 | Denis Ten | Kazakhstan | 80.10 |
| 5 | Patrick Chan | Canada | 76.10 |
| 6 | Alexander Petrov | Russia | 74.64 |
| 7 | Max Aaron | United States | 72.91 |
| 8 | Wang Yi | China | 72.08 |
| 9 | Kim Jin-seo | South Korea | 71.24 |
| 10 | Chafik Besseghier | France | 68.36 |
| 11 | Romain Ponsart | France | 62.86 |

=== Women's singles ===
Women's results
| Rank | Skater | Nation | SP |
|---|---|---|---|
| 1st place, gold medalist(s) | Gracie Gold | United States | 73.32 |
| 2nd place, silver medalist(s) | Yulia Lipnitskaya | Russia | 65.63 |
| 3rd place, bronze medalist(s) | Roberta Rodeghiero | Italy | 58.81 |
| 4 | Kanako Murakami | Japan | 58.30 |
| 5 | Elizaveta Tuktamysheva | Russia | 56.21 |
| 6 | Gabrielle Daleman | Canada | 55.35 |
| 7 | Angelīna Kučvaļska | Latvia | 53.68 |
| 8 | Angela Wang | United States | 53.60 |
| 9 | Haruka Imai | Japan | 47.87 |
| 10 | Brooklee Han | Australia | 47.65 |
| 11 | Maé-Bérénice Méité | France | 46.82 |
| 12 | Laurine Lecavelier | France | 46.53 |

=== Pairs ===
Pairs results
| Rank | Team | Nation | SP |
|---|---|---|---|
| 1st place, gold medalist(s) | Tatiana Volosozhar; Maxim Trankov | Russia | 74.50 |
| 2nd place, silver medalist(s) | Vanessa James; Morgan Ciprès | France | 65.75 |
| 3rd place, bronze medalist(s) | Julianne Séguin; Charlie Bilodeau | Canada | 64.95 |
| 4 | Peng Cheng; Zhang Hao | China | 64.10 |
| 5 | Nicole Della Monica; Matteo Guarise | Italy | 64.08 |
| 6 | Marissa Castelli; Mervin Tran | United States | 62.63 |
| 7 | Evgenia Tarasova; Vladimir Morozov | Russia | 62.32 |
| 8 | Miriam Ziegler; Severin Kiefer | Austria | 50.56 |

=== Ice dance ===
Ice dance results
| Rank | Team | Nation | SD |
|---|---|---|---|
| 1st place, gold medalist(s) | Madison Hubbell; Zachary Donohue | United States | 64.45 |
| 2nd place, silver medalist(s) | Piper Gilles; Paul Poirier | Canada | 63.94 |
| 3rd place, bronze medalist(s) | Alexandra Stepanova; Ivan Bukin | Russia | 60.64 |
| 4 | Penny Coomes; Nicholas Buckland | Great Britain | 58.34 |
| 5 | Laurence Fournier Beaudry; Nikolaj Sørensen | Denmark | 54.72 |
| 6 | Anna Yanovskaya; Sergey Mozgov | Russia | 52.88 |
| 7 | Alisa Agafonova; Alper Uçar | Turkey | 47.64 |

== Works cited ==
- "Special Regulations & Technical Rules – Single & Pair Skating and Ice Dance 2014" (PDF). International Skating Union. Archived from the original (PDF) on 22 October 2015.
