= 2015 Skate America =

- Type: Grand Prix
- Date: October 23 – 25
- Season: 2015–16
- Location: Milwaukee, Wisconsin
- Host: U.S. Figure Skating
- Venue: UW–Milwaukee Panther Arena

Champions
- Men's singles: (United States) Max Aaron
- Ladies' singles: (Russia) Evgenia Medvedeva
- Pairs: (China) Sui Wenjing / Han Cong
- Ice dance: (United States) Madison Chock / Evan Bates
- Previous: 2014 Skate America
- Next: 2016 Skate America
- Next Grand Prix: 2015 Skate Canada International

The 2015 Progressive Skate America was the first event of six in the 2015–16 ISU Grand Prix of Figure Skating, a senior-level international invitational competition series. It was held at the UW–Milwaukee Panther Arena in Milwaukee, Wisconsin on October 23–25. Medals were awarded in the disciplines of men's singles, ladies' singles, pair skating, and ice dancing. Skaters earned points toward qualifying for the 2015–16 Grand Prix Final.

== Entries ==
Country	Men	Ladies	Pairs	Ice dancing
Australia	Brendan Kerry			
Canada		Alaine Chartrand	Julianne Séguin / Charlie Bilodeau	Piper Gilles / Paul Poirier
China	Yan Han		Sui Wenjing / Han Cong; Wang Xuehan / Wang Lei	Wang Shiyue / Liu Xinyu
France	Florent Amodio			
Israel	Alexei Bychenko			
Japan	Takahito Mura; Shoma Uno	Haruka Imai; Satoko Miyahara; Miyu Nakashio		
Kazakhstan	Denis Ten	Elizabet Tursynbaeva		
South Korea		Park So-youn		
Russia	Konstantin Menshov; Adian Pitkeev	Yulia Lipnitskaya; Evgenia Medvedeva	Kristina Astakhova / Alexei Rogonov; Ksenia Stolbova / Fedor Klimov	Victoria Sinitsina / Nikita Katsalapov; Anna Yanovskaya / Sergey Mozgov
Slovakia		Nicole Rajičová		
Ukraine				Alexandra Nazarova / Maxim Nikitin
United States	Max Aaron; Jason Brown; Ross Miner	Mariah Bell; Karen Chen; Gracie Gold	Tarah Kayne / Daniel O'Shea; Jessica Pfund / Joshua Santillan; Alexa Scimeca / Chris Knierim	Anastasia Cannuscio / Colin McManus; Madison Chock / Evan Bates; Kaitlin Hawayek / Jean-Luc Baker

=== Changes to preliminary assignments ===
- On August 21, three out of the four host picks were announced as Ross Miner, Karen Chen, and Gretchen Donlan / Nathan Bartholomay.
- On August 26, the fourth host pick was officially announced as Anastasia Cannuscio / Colin McManus.
- On October 21, Gretchen Donlan / Nathan Bartholomay were replaced by Jessica Pfund / Joshua Santillan as Donlan / Bartholomay withdrew due to Donlan recovering from an illness.

== Results ==
=== Men ===
Rank	Name	Nation	Total points	SP		FS	
1	Max Aaron	United States	258.95	1	86.67	2	172.28
2	Shoma Uno	Japan	257.43	4	80.78	1	176.65
3	Jason Brown	United States	238.47	8	78.64	3	159.83
4	Yan Han	China	236.03	2	86.53	5	149.50
5	Konstantin Menshov	Russia	230.79	3	86.15	6	144.64
6	Adian Pitkeev	Russia	230.75	5	79.90	4	150.85
7	Ross Miner	United States	215.11	7	78.96	8	136.15
8	Brendan Kerry	Australia	203.48	11	65.41	7	138.07
9	Denis Ten	Kazakhstan	201.52	6	79.02	11	122.50
10	Takahito Mura	Japan	200.83	10	71.66	9	129.17
11	Florent Amodio	France	197.45	9	71.96	10	125.49
12	Alexei Bychenko	Israel	171.83	12	50.68	12	121.15

=== Ladies ===
Rank	Name	Nation	Total points	SP		FS	
1	Evgenia Medvedeva	Russia	206.01	1	70.92	2	135.09
2	Gracie Gold	United States	202.80	2	65.39	1	137.41
3	Satoko Miyahara	Japan	188.07	3	65.12	3	122.95
4	Elizabet Tursynbaeva	Kazakhstan	178.56	7	59.26	4	119.30
5	Karen Chen	United States	172.54	4	62.28	6	110.26
6	Yulia Lipnitskaya	Russia	170.63	5	62.24	7	108.39
7	Nicole Rajičová	Slovakia	167.32	12	50.33	5	116.99
8	Mariah Bell	United States	160.94	11	52.73	8	108.21
9	Park So-youn	South Korea	159.66	10	53.78	9	105.88
10	Haruka Imai	Japan	158.65	9	56.52	10	102.13
11	Miyu Nakashio	Japan	153.29	8	57.01	11	96.28
12	Alaine Chartrand	Canada	148.20	6	59.40	12	88.80

=== Pairs ===
Rank	Name	Nation	Total points	SP		FS	
1	Sui Wenjing / Han Cong	China	202.00	2	68.28	1	133.72
2	Alexa Scimeca / Chris Knierim	United States	191.97	1	69.69	4	122.28
3	Julianne Séguin / Charlie Bilodeau	Canada	189.49	4	64.85	3	124.64
4	Ksenia Stolbova / Fedor Klimov	Russia	189.06	5	63.41	2	125.65
5	Wang Xuehan / Wang Lei	China	171.77	3	64.95	6	106.82
6	Tarah Kayne / Daniel O'Shea	United States	165.99	6	58.38	5	107.61
7	Kristina Astakhova / Alexei Rogonov	Russia	157.97	7	58.25	8	99.72
8	Jessica Pfund / Joshua Santillan	United States	151.40	8	50.20	7	101.20

=== Ice dancing ===
Rank	Name	Nation	Total points	SD		FD	
1	Madison Chock / Evan Bates	United States	173.22	1	70.56	1	102.66
2	Victoria Sinitsina / Nikita Katsalapov	Russia	162.21	2	62.76	2	99.45
3	Piper Gilles / Paul Poirier	Canada	157.58	3	61.33	3	96.25
4	Kaitlin Hawayek / Jean-Luc Baker	United States	150.69	4	56.54	4	94.15
5	Anastasia Cannuscio / Colin McManus	United States	143.67	6	52.92	5	90.75
6	Anna Yanovskaya / Sergey Mozgov	Russia	140.92	5	53.35	6	87.57
7	Alexandra Nazarova / Maxim Nikitin	Ukraine	135.60	7	50.53	7	85.07
8	Wang Shiyue / Liu Xinyu	China	129.59	8	49.37	8	80.22
