= Adian Pitkeev =

Russian former figure skater (born 1998)

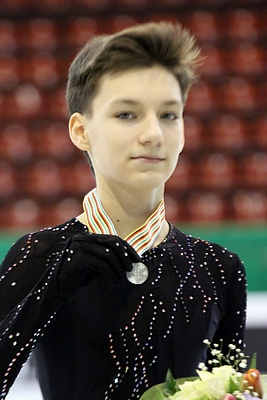

Personal information
- Native name: Адьян Юрьевич Питкеев
- Full name: Adian Yuryevich Pitkeev
- Born: 16 May 1998 (age 28) Moscow, Russia
- Height: 1.72 m (5 ft 7 1/2 in)

Figure skating career
- Country: Russia
- Skating club: CSKA Moscow
- Began skating: 2002
Medal record
Representing Russia
Figure skating: Men's singles
Russian Championships
Bronze medal – third place	2015 Sochi	Men’s Singles
World Junior Championships
Silver medal – second place	2014 Sofia	Men's singles
Junior Grand Prix Final
Silver medal – second place	2013–14 Fukuoka	Men's singles
European Youth Olympic Festival
Gold medal – first place	2013 Poiana Brașov	Men's singles

Adian Yuryevich Pitkeev (Russian: Адьян Юрьевич Питкеев; born 16 May 1998) is a Russian former figure skater. The 2015 Russian national bronze medalist, he has won one medal on the Grand Prix series and two on the ISU Challenger Series. On the junior level, he is the 2014 World Junior silver medalist, the 2013–14 JGP Final silver medalist, and the 2013 European Youth Olympic champion.

== Personal life ==
Adian Pitkeev was born on 16 May 1998 in Moscow.

Pitkeev married Maya Khromykh on February 14, 2026.

== Career ==
After watching Alexei Yagudin at the 2002 Olympics, Pitkeev expressed interest in skating to his mother, who brought him to an ice rink. Olga Volobueva coached him until 2009. He then joined Eteri Tutberidze's group at Olympic School No. 37.

=== 2012–13 season ===
Pitkeev debuted internationally in the 2012–13 season, placing sixth in the United States and eighth in Slovenia on the Junior Grand Prix (JGP) series. At the Russian Nationals, he was 15th in his senior-level debut and then fourth behind Alexander Petrov on the junior level. He won the gold medal at the 2013 European Youth Olympic Festival.

=== 2013–14 season ===
In the 2013–14 season, Pitkeev won the silver medal in Riga, Latvia, and then gold in Gdańsk, Poland competing on the 2013 JGP series. He qualified for his first Junior Grand Prix Final and won the silver medal in Fukuoka, Japan. At the Russian Championships, Pitkeev placed fifth in his second appearance on the senior level and then won the junior title, finishing 1.88 points ahead of Petrov. At the 2014 World Junior Championships, Pitkeev won the silver medal after placing seventh in the short and second in the free skate.

=== 2014–15 season ===
Pitkeev began the 2014–15 season with a bronze medal at the 2014 Lombardia Trophy, an ISU Challenger Series (CS) event and his first senior international. He finished sixth at both of his Grand Prix assignments, the 2014 Skate America and 2014 Trophée Éric Bompard. Having won the bronze medal at the Russian Nationals, he was selected to compete at the 2015 European Championships and finished 7th. Returning to junior competition, he placed 5th overall, just ahead of teammate Alexander Petrov, at the 2015 World Junior Championships in Tallinn, Estonia.

=== 2015–16 season ===
Pitkeev started the 2015–16 season on the Challenger Series, placing fourth at the 2015 Ondrej Nepela Trophy. A recipient of two Grand Prix invitations, he placed 5th at the 2015 Skate America before winning his first GP medal, silver, at the 2015 Rostelecom Cup. In December, he was awarded the bronze medal at a CS event, the 2015 Golden Spin of Zagreb, behind Adam Rippon of the United States. Later that month, he placed 3rd in the short, 11th in the free, and 9th overall at the 2016 Russian Championships. He competed with a back injury at the Russian nationals and had to take painkillers. He later underwent treatment in Germany, the United States, and Russia.

In March 2016, Pitkeev left his longtime coaches, Eteri Tutberidze and Sergei Dudakov, to train at CSKA Moscow under Elena Buianova.

=== Later career ===
On 13 September, Pitkeev withdrew from both of his 2016–17 Grand Prix assignments, the Trophée de France and NHK Trophy, due to his back injury. In December, Buianova said that he was continuing treatment and had not yet returned to the ice.

In late June, Pitkeev announced his retirement from singles skating due to chronic back injuries and that he would switch to ice dance. It was later announced that he teamed up with Alisa Lozko and that the team would be coached by Elena Ilinykh. They never competed together.

In a 2017 interview, Pitkeev said that a slight congenital spinal deformity may have contributed to his back problems.

== Programs ==
Season	Short program	Free skating	Exhibition
2015–2016	Pain by Takeshi Hama; Appassionata by Secret Garden choreo. by Daniil Gleikhengauz	The Mission by Ennio Morricone performed by The Piano Guys choreo. by Marina Zueva	Saragina Rumba by 17 Hippies; You Can Leave Your Hat On by Joe Cocker
2014–2015	Rhapsody on a Theme of Paganini for Piano and Orchestra by Sergei Rachmaninoff choreo. by Alexander Zhulin	Sarabande Suite by Globus choreo. by Alexander Zhulin	Appassionata by Secret Garden
2013–2014	At Voland's Ball Waltz by Igor Kornelyuk choreo. by Eteri Tutberidze	Art On Ice by Edvin Marton choreo. by Eteri Tutberidze	Medley by The Scorpions; At Voland's Ball Waltz by Igor Kornelyuk choreo. by Eteri Tutberidze
2012–2013	Hunter - Jaguar by Safri Duo	Boléro by Maurice Ravel	

== Competitive highlights ==
GP: Grand Prix; CS: Challenger Series; JGP: Junior Grand Prix

International
Event	11–12	12–13	13–14	14–15	15–16	16–17
Europeans				7th		
GP NHK Trophy						WD
GP Rostelecom Cup					2nd	
GP Skate America				6th	6th	
GP France				6th		WD
CS Golden Spin					3rd	
CS Lombardia				3rd		
CS Ondrej Nepela					4th	
International: Junior
Junior Worlds			2nd	5th		
JGP Final			2nd			
JGP Latvia			2nd			
JGP Poland			1st			
JGP Slovenia		8th				
JGP U.S.		6th				
EYOF		1st				
Ice Star			1st			
National
Russian Champ.		15th	5th	3rd	9th	
Russian Junior Champ.	11th	4th	1st			

== Detailed results ==
=== Senior level ===
Results in the 2015–16 season
Date	Event	SP		FS		Total	
Date	Event	P	Score	P	Score	P	Score
Oct 1–3, 2015	(Slovakia) 2015 Ondrej Nepela Trophy	5	58.37	3	145.83	4	204.20
Oct 22–25, 2015	(United States) 2015 Skate America	5	79.90	4	150.85	6	230.75
Nov 20–22, 2015	(Russia) 2015 Rostelecom Cup	1	87.54	5	162.93	2	250.47
Dec 25–5, 2015	(Croatia) 2015 Golden Spin of Zagreb	5	70.21	3	153.47	3	223.68
Dec 23–27, 2015	(Russia) 2016 Russian Championships	3	86.63	11	143.86	9	230.49

Results in the 2014–15 season
Date	Event	SP		FS		Total	
Date	Event	P	Score	P	Score	P	Score
Sep 18–21, 2014	(Italy) 2014 Lombardia Trophy	5	71.60	3	144.30	3	215.90
Oct 24–27, 2014	(United States) 2014 Skate America	5	76.13	7	135.94	6	212.07
Nov 21–23, 2014	(France) 2014 Trophée Bompard	8	76.21	7	143.17	6	219.38
Dec 24–27, 2014	(Russia) 2015 Russian Championships	4	87.36	3	153.60	3	240.96
Jan 26–Feb 1, 2015	(Sweden) 2015 European Championships	9	69.78	6	141.09	7	210.87

=== Junior level ===
Results in the 2014–15 season
Date	Event	SP		FS		Total	
Date	Event	P	Score	P	Score	P	Score
Mar 2–8, 2015	(Estonia) 2015 World Junior Championships	2	76.94	7	133.77	5	210.71

Results in the 2013–14 season
Date	Event	SP		FS		Total	
Date	Event	P	Score	P	Score	P	Score
Sep 29–31, 2013	2013 JGP Latvia	5	59.91	1	127.28	2	187.19
Oct 20–22, 2013	2013 JGP Poland	1	71.50	1	142.39	1	213.89
Oct 18–20, 2013	(Belarus) 2013 Ice Star	1	73.06	1	140.81	1	213.87
Dec 5–8, 2013	(Japan) 2013-14 JGP Final	2	72.24	2	144.00	2	216.24
Dec 24–27, 2013	(Russia) 2014 Russian Senior Championships	4	76.75	6	147.50	5	224.25
Jan 23–24, 2014	(Russia) 2014 Russian Junior Championships	1	79.82	1	149.77	1	229.52
Mar 12–16, 2014	(Bulgaria) 2014 World Junior Championships	7	68.76	2	143.75	2	212.51

Results in the 2012–13 season
Date	Event	SP		FS		Total	
Date	Event	P	Score	P	Score	P	Score
Aug 29–Sep 1, 2012	(United States) 2012 JGP USA	3	57.40	8	97.57	6	154.97
Sep 26–28, 2012	2012 JGP Slovenia	10	47.82	8	106.06	8	153.88
Dec 24–28, 2012	(Russia) 2013 Russian Senior Championships	15	60.65	15	118.89	15	179.54
Jan 1–3, 2013	(Russia) 2014 Russian Junior Championships	4	68.72	4	138.35	4	207.07
Feb 17–22, 2013	(Romania) 2013 EYOWF	1	58.61	1	118.49	1	177.10

Results in the 2011–12 season
Date	Event	SP		FS		Total	
Date	Event	P	Score	P	Score	P	Score
Feb 5–7, 2012	(Russia) 2012 Russian Junior Championships	8	59.54	12	103.19	11	162.73
