= Maria Stavitskaia =

Russian figure skater

Personal information
- Full name: Maria Ivanovna Stavitskaia
- Born: 1 September 1997 (age 29) Melitopol, Ukraine
- Height: 1.66 m (5 ft 5 1/2 in)

Figure skating career
- Country: Russia
- Coach: Alexander Zhulin
- Skating club: Moskvich
- Began skating: 2002
Medal record
Representing Russia
Figure skating: Singles
European Youth Olympic Festival
Gold medal – first place	2013 Poiana Brașov	Singles

Maria Ivanovna Stavitskaia (Russian: Мария Ивановна Ставицкая; born 1 September 1997) is a Russian former competitive figure skater. She is the 2013 Ukrainian Open silver medalist, 2012 JGP Germany bronze medalist, and a two-time Cup of Nice junior champion.

== Career ==
In the 2011–12 season, Stavitskaia finished 6th in her ISU Junior Grand Prix event in Estonia and won the junior event at 2011 Cup of Nice.

Assigned to two 2012–13 JGP events, Stavitskaia finished 7th in Austria and won the bronze medal in Germany. She then won her second Cup of Nice junior title and ended her season with the gold medal at the 2013 European Youth Winter Olympic Festival.

Stavitskaia won the silver medal in her senior international debut at the 2013 Ukrainian Open.

On 5 June 2015 it was announced that Stavitskaia had decided to switch divisions from ladies singles to ice dance, and would start skating with Anton Shibnev as her partner, coached by Alexander Zhulin. In summer 2016 it became known that Stavitskaia and Andrei Bagin would skate together in season 2016–17.

== Programs ==
Season	Short program	Free skating
2013-2015	Raba Lyubvi (A Slave of Love) by Eduard Artemyev choreo. by Tatiana Prokofieva	Don Quixote by Ludwig Minkus choreo. by Tatiana Prokofieva
2012-2013	Swan Lake by Pyotr Ilyich Tchaikovsky	Romeo and Juliet: Juliet as a Young Girl; Montagues and Capulets; Introduction by Sergei Prokofiev
2011-2012	The River Cruise (from Charlie and the Chocolate Factory); Main Titles by Danny Elfman	Cinderella by Sergei Prokofiev

== Competitive highlights ==
=== Ice dance with Bagin ===
International
Event	2016–17
Winter Universiade	12th
National
Russian Championships	8th

=== Ice dance with Shibnev ===
International
Event	2015–16
Lombardia Trophy	8th

=== Singles career ===
GP: Grand Prix; JGP: Junior Grand Prix

International
Event	2011–12	2012–13	2013–14	2014–15
GP Rostel. Cup				7th
Cup of Nice				10th
Ukrainian Open			2nd	
International: Junior
JGP Austria		7th		
JGP Germany		3rd		
JGP Estonia	6th			
EYOF		1st J.		
Cup of Nice	1st J.	1st J.		
Volvo Open Cup		1st J.		
National
Russian Champ.	18th	11th		11th
Russian Jr. Champ.	10th	10th		
