= Kim Jin-seo =

South Korean figure skater (born 1996)

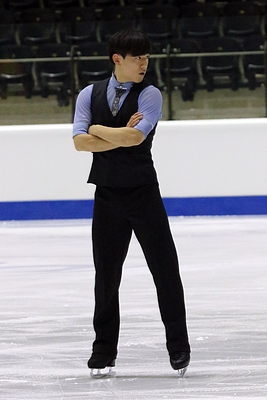
- Kim at the 2015 Junior Worlds

Personal information
- Native name: 김진서
- Full name: Kim Jin-seo
- Born: November 29, 1996 (age 29) Seoul, South Korea
- Height: 1.67 m (5 ft 5 1/2 in)

Figure skating career
- Country: South Korea
- Began skating: 2008
- Retired: 2018

- Kim Jin-seo
- Hangul: 김진서
- Hanja: 金鎮瑞
- RR: Gim Jinseo
- MR: Kim Chinsŏ

Kim Jin-seo (Korean: 김진서; born November 29, 1996) is a former South Korean figure skater. He is the 2012 and 2014 South Korean national senior champion, the 2012 ISU JGP Austria bronze medalist and the 2014 Ondrej Nepela Trophy silver medalist.

At the 2014 World Championships, Kim became the first Korean men's singles skater to pass the 200-point total mark.

== Personal life ==
Kim was born on November 29, 1996, in Seoul, South Korea.

In August 2022, Kim announced that he was engaged to longtime girlfriend, Park Seon-kyung, and she was pregnant with their first child. They married in the summer of 2023.

Their son, Kim I-an, was born in October 2022.

== Competitive career ==
=== Early career ===
Kim started skating at the age of 11 as a means of physical therapy for his health. Within a few months, his then-teacher recognized Kim's potential and suggested skating seriously to try to make the Korean national team. He began competing in 2009. In the 2010–11 season, he won the junior men's title at the 2011 South Korean Championships.

=== 2011–12 season: First senior national title ===
In June 2011, Kim sustained an injury to his left eardrum after falling on a rainy day during an outdoor practice session. The fall resulted in 80% of his left eardrum being torn and the need for surgery to replace the lost tissues. Despite being only partially recovered from the injury, Kim participated in the qualifying event for the ISU Junior Grand Prix (JGP) series but was unsuccessful. A few months later, in January 2012, he competed in the senior men's event at the 2012 South Korean Championships. He delivered two nearly-clean programs which brought him a national title for the first time in his career with a total of 186.44.

Kim joined 2010 Olympic ladies champion Yuna Kim in an ice show, the All That Skate Spring 2012, held in Seoul, South Korea on 4–6 May 2012, along with other skaters such as Shen Xue / Zhao Hongbo, Patrick Chan, and Stéphane Lambiel.

=== 2012–13 season: Junior Grand Prix debut ===
Kim won his country's JGP selection event, held in August, earning two spots for the Junior Grand Prix. He made his junior international debut at the JGP Austria, where he won the bronze medal after being placed tenth in the short and second in the free skate with a total of 175.87. At this event, he surpassed the minimum TES for the Worlds in his nearly-clean free-skate. At the JGP Croatia, Kim had a few mistakes in the short placing in eighth, but again rebounded in the free skate to place second in the free skate. With a total of 176.43, he placed in the fourth position. After two JGP events, he competed at the NRW Trophy to get the minimum TES for the short program. He skated a clean short program and qualified for the 2013 World Championships in London, Ontario, Canada. In the short program, he landed a clean triple axel and triple lutz with connecting steps and stepped out of his triple toe-loop triple toe-loop combination. He placed 26th in the short and just missed qualifying for the free skate by a point and a half.

=== 2013–14 season ===
Kim started the season at a JGP event in Riga, Latvia, where he placed 6th. After the event, at the 2013 Nebelhorn Trophy which was the qualifying event for the 2014 Winter Olympics, Kim placed 20th in the men's event. A few weeks later, Kim placed 6th in the JGP in Tallinn, Estonia, with total of 184.53. At the Korean Nationals, Kim had a clean short program and headed into the free skate as the leader. In the free skate, he also had an almost-clean programme. With the total of 209.35, he became a two-time Korean national champion, which meant he also qualified for the 2014 World Championships. At the World Championships, he had his new personal best in short, free skate and total and placed in 16th place. Earning a total of 202.80 points, he became the first Korean male skater to cross the 200-point mark.

=== 2014–15 season: Grand Prix debut ===
Kim was assigned to the 2014 NHK Trophy. At the 2014 Ondrej Nepela Trophy, Kim became the first Korean male skater to break the 70-point mark in the short program with the score of 71.44. He placed in 9th place at both his Grand Prix assignments. At the 2015 World Junior Championships, he placed fourth in the short programs, 11th in the free skate, and ninth overall, thus securing two spots at the 2016 Junior Worlds.

=== 2015–16 season ===
Kim began his season at the Ice Star, where he won the gold medal. He was assigned to the 2015 Skate Canada and the 2015 Trophée Éric Bompard in the 2015–16 ISU Grand Prix season.

At the Skate Canada in Lethbridge, Alberta, he placed 9th overall. At the Trophée Éric Bompard in Bordeaux, France, he placed 9th in the short program before the free skate was cancelled due to the November 2015 Paris attacks.

At the 2016 Korean Championships, Kim won the silver medal behind Lee June-hyoung, and was named to the 2016 Four Continents Championships team, where he finished tenth.

=== 2016–17 ===
Kim opened the 2016–17 figure skating season with a silver medal at 2016 Asian Open and a sixth-place finish at 2016 CS Lombardia Trophy. At the 2017 Korean Championships, Kim won the silver medal before Cha Jun-hwan, who wasn't age eligible to compete at the 2017 Four Continents Championships or the 2017 World Championships, thus Kim was named to both teams.

Competing at the 2017 Winter University Games, Kim finished in eighth-place. At the Four Continents Championships, Kim placed seventeenth. Kim then went on to finish seventh at the 2017 Asian Winter Games.

Kim finished twenty-sixth in the short program the World Championships, failing to qualify for the free skate segment of the competition.

=== 2017–18 ===
Kim began the 2017–18 figure skating season with a tenth-place finish at the 2017 CS Ondrej Nepela Trophy.

At the 2018 Korean Championships, Kim once again placed second to Cha Jun-hwan. Due to their being only one spot for Korean men's singles at the 2018 Winter Olympics in Pyeongchang, the spot was ultimately awarded to Cha, however, Kim was given the spot to compete at the 2018 World Championships.

Kim finished thirty-third in the short program segment of the World Championships, failing to qualify for the free program segment.

On the advice of his doctor, he retired from competitive figure skating following the season due to a back injury.

== Coaching career ==
Following his retirement, Kim began working as an assistant coach to his former coach, Chi Hyun-jung.

His current and former students include:

- Huh Ji-yu
- Hwang Jeong-yul
- Kim Hyun-gyeom
- Kim Min-chae
- Kim Seo-young
- Kim Yu-jae
- Kim Yu-seong
- Kwon Min-sol
- Lee Hae-in
- Lee Hyo-won
- Lee Jae-keun
- Lim Ju-heon
- Park Eun-bi
- Shin Ji-a
- Yu Dong-han
- Yun Ah-sun

== Programs ==
Season	Short program	Free skating	Exhibition
2017–2018	Need You Now by Lady A performed by Chris Mann choreo. by Scott Brown, Cindy Stuart	Nella Fantasia by Ennio Morricone choreo. by Scott Brown, Cindy Stuart	Never performed by Nation's Son; Singin' in the Rain by Gene Kelly choreo. by Kenji Miyamoto; 24K Magic by Bruno Mars
2016–2017	Moondance by Van Morrison covered by Michael Bublé choreo. by Charlie White	Singin' in the Rain by Gene Kelly choreo. by Kenji Miyamoto	Fantastic Baby by G-Dragon, T.O.P, Teddy
2015–2016	Moonlight Sonata by Ludwig van Beethoven choreo. by Kenji Miyamoto	Singin' in the Rain by Gene Kelly choreo. by Kenji Miyamoto	Reply 1988 OST: 걱정말아요 그대 (Don't Worry Dear) by Jeon In-kwon; 어젯밤 이야기 (Last Night's Story) by Sobangcha choreo. by Kim Jin-seo
2014–2015	Jazz medley: Beat For Beatniks; The Girl With Sun In Her Hair by John Barry; Green Onions by Booker T. & the M.G.'s choreo. by Stéphane Lambiel	Legends of the Fall by James Horner choreo. by David Wilson	Growl by Exo
2013–2014	The Mask by Randy Edelman choreo. by David Wilson	Legends of the Fall by James Horner choreo. by David Wilson	Growl by Exo; The Mask by Randy Edelman choreo. by David Wilson
2012–2013	Almoraima by Paco de Lucía choreo. by Shin Yea-ji	Dralion; Varekai (from Cirque du Soleil) choreo. by Shin Yea-ji	Fantastic Baby by BigBang choreo. by Shin Yea-ji
2011–2012	Almoraima by Paco de Lucía choreo. by Shin Yea-ji	IRIS choreo. by Shin Yea-ji	Hands Up by 2PM
2010–2011	The Taoist Wizard	IRIS choreo. by Shin Yea-ji	
2009–2010		Moon River by Henry Mancini	

== Competitive highlights ==
GP: Grand Prix; CS: Challenger Series; JGP: Junior Grand Prix

International
Event	10–11	11–12	12–13	13–14	14–15	15–16	16–17	17–18
Worlds			26th	16th			26th	33rd
Four Continents			19th	WD	15th	10th	17th	
GP Bompard						9th		
GP Cup of China					9th			
GP NHK Trophy					9th			
GP Skate Canada						9th		
CS Lombardia							6th	
CS Nepela Trophy					2nd			10th
Asian Games							7th	
Asian Open					2nd		2nd	
Universiade							8th	
Ice Star						1st		
Nebelhorn Trophy				20th				
NRW Trophy			7th					
International: Junior, Novice
Junior Worlds					9th			
JGP Austria			3rd					
JGP Croatia			4th					
JGP Estonia				6th				
JGP Latvia				6th				
Children's Games	1st N							
National
South Korean Champ.	1st J	1st	2nd	1st	2nd	2nd	2nd	2nd
Ranking Comp.		4th	1st	3rd	2nd	2nd	2nd	6th
TBD: Assigned; WD: Withdrew; Levels – N: Novice; J: Junior

== Detailed results ==
=== Senior ===
Personal bests are highlighted in bold.

**2017–18 season**
Date	Event	SP	FS	Total
March 19–25, 2018	2018 World Championships	33; 60.72	DNQ	33
January 5–7, 2018	2018 South Korea Championships	3; 76.05	2; 151.18	2; 227.65
September 21–23, 2017	2017 CS Ondrej Nepela Trophy	14; 62.19	8; 122.27	10; 184.46
**2016–17 season**
Date	Event	SP	FS	Total
March 29 – April 2, 2017	2017 World Championships	26; 68.66	DNQ	26
February 23–26, 2017	2017 Asian Winter Games	6; 76.99	7; 151.68	7; 228.67
February 15–19, 2017	2017 Four Continents Championships	18; 64.26	15; 130.79	17; 195.05
February 1–5, 2017	2017 Winter Universiade	14; 66.81	4; 153.41	8; 220.22
January 6–8, 2017	2017 South Korean Championships	2; 77.25	2; 138.91	2; 216.16
September 8–11, 2016	2016 CS Lombardia Trophy	6; 62.33	6; 122.25	6; 184.58
August 4–7, 2016	2016 Asian Figure Skating Trophy	1; 65.81	2; 139.88	2; 205.69
**2015–16 season**
Date	Event	SP	FS	Total
February 16–21, 2016	2016 Four Continents Championships	12; 65.13	11; 136.30	10; 201.43
January 8–10, 2016	2016 South Korean Championships	2; 68.40	2; 134.08	2; 202.48
November 13–15, 2015	2015 Trophée Éric Bompard	9; 71.24	-	9; 71.24
October 30 – November 1, 2015	2015 Skate Canada International	8; 68.64	10; 127.20	9; 195.84
October 9–11, 2015	2015 Ice Star	1; 65.26	1; 144.30	1; 209.56
**2014–15 season**
Date	Event	SP	FS	Total
February 9–15, 2015	2015 Four Continents Championships	17; 61.53	13; **138.11**	15; 199.64
January 5–9, 2015	2015 South Korean Championships	1; 69.27	2; 128.57	2; 197.84
November 28–30, 2014	2014 NHK Trophy	9; 65.69	9; 131.51	9; 197.20
November 7–9, 2014	2014 Cup of China	9; 62.46	9; 121.00	9; 183.46
October 1–5, 2014	2014 Ondrej Nepela Trophy	1; 71.44	3; 135.90	2; **207.34**
August 6–10, 2014	2014 Asian Figure Skating Trophy	2; 69.82	3; 139.25	2; 209.07

=== Junior level ===
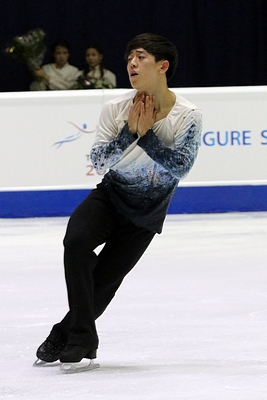
Kim at the 2015 World Junior Championships.

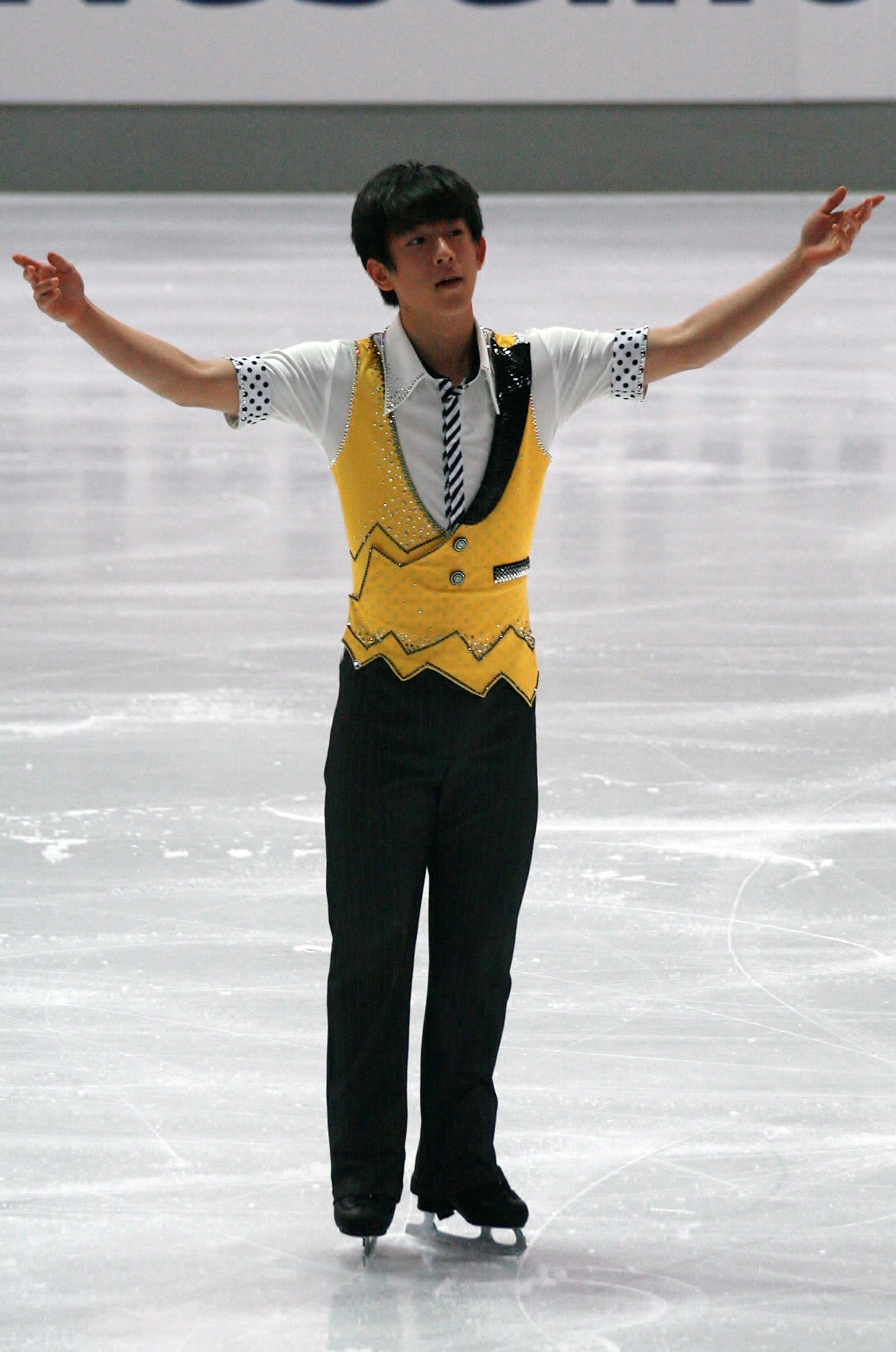
Kim at the 2013 Nebelhorn Trophy.

2014–15 season
Date	Event	Level	SP	FS	Total
March 2–8, 2015	2015 World Junior Championships	Junior	4; **74.43**	11; 127.82	9; 202.25
2013–14 season
Date	Event	Level	SP	FS	Total
March 24–30, 2014	2014 World Championships	Senior	13; 69.56	16; 133.24	16; 202.80
January 3–5, 2014	2014 South Korean Championships	Senior	1; 72.92	2; 136.43	1; 209.35
October 9–13, 2013	2013 JGP Estonia	Junior	10; 56.25	4; 128.28	6; 184.53
September 25–28, 2013	2013 Nebelhorn Trophy	Senior	30; 44.92	14; 116.37	20; 161.29
August 27 – September 1, 2013	2013 JGP Latvia	Junior	4; 60.69	6; 109.28	6; 169.97
2012–13 season
Date	Event	Level	SP	FS	Total
March 10–17, 2013	2013 World Championships	Senior	26; 60.75	DNQ	DNQ
February 6–11, 2013	2013 Four Continents Championships	Senior	17; 58.04	19; 112.97	19; 171.01
January 2–6, 2013	2013 South Korean Championships	Senior	2; 60.21	2; 121.13	2; 181.34
December 5–9, 2012	2012 NRW Trophy	Senior	3; 69.95	7; 124.03	7; 193.68
October 26–28, 2012	2012 JGP Croatia	Junior	8; 51.37	3; 125.06	4; 176.43
September 12–15, 2012	2012 JGP Austria	Junior	10; 49.60	2; 126.27	3; 175.87
2011–12 season
Date	Event	Level	SP	FS	Total
January 4–8, 2012	2012 South Korean Championships	Senior	1; 62.55	1; 123.89	1; 186.44
2010–11 season
Date	Event	Level	SP	FS	Total
January 27–30, 2011	2011 International Children's Winter Games	Novice	1; 41.02	1; 88.01	1; 129.03
January 12–16, 2011	2011 South Korean Championships	Junior	1; 52.38	1; 90.18	1; 142.56
