= Figure skating at the 2013 European Youth Olympic Winter Festival =

- Date: February 17 – 22
- Season: 2012–13
- Location: Poiana Brașov, Romania
- Venue: Poiana Brașov Ice Rink

Champions
- Men's singles: (Russia) Adyan Pitkeev
- Ladies' singles: (Russia) Maria Stavitskaia
- Previous: 2011 European Youth Olympic Winter Festival
- Next: 2015 European Youth Olympic Winter Festival

Figure skating at the 2013 European Youth Olympic Winter Festival took place at the Poiana Brașov Ice Rink in Poiana Brașov, Romania between February 17 and 22, 2013. Skaters competed in the disciplines of men's singles and ladies' singles.

== Medal summary ==
=== Medalists ===
Event	Gold	Silver	Bronze
Men	Adyan Pitkeev (RUS)	Yaroslav Paniot (UKR)	Adrien Tesson (FRA)
Women	Maria Stavitskaia (RUS)	Anais Ventard (FRA)	Maria Katharina Herceg (GER)

=== Medal table ===
Rank	Nation	Gold	Silver	Bronze	Total
1	Russia (RUS)	2	0	0	2
2	France (FRA)	0	1	1	2
3	Ukraine (UKR)	0	1	0	1
4	Germany (GER)	0	0	1	1
Totals (4 entries)		2	2	2	6

== Results ==
=== Men ===
Rank	Name	Nation	Total points	SP		FS	
1	Adyan Pitkeev	Russia	177.10	1	58.61	1	118.49
2	Yaroslav Paniot	Ukraine	156.02	2	57.10	4	98.92
3	Adrien Tesson	France	154.12	4	48.61	2	105.51
4	Graham Newberry	United Kingdom	150.54	3	48.90	3	101.64
5	Cătălin Dimitrescu	Romania	133,31	8	45.49	5	87.82
6	Anton Karpuk	Belarus	130.58	9	43.69	6	86.89
7	Sondre Oddvoll Boe	Norway	129.43	6	46.68	7	82.75
8	John Olof Hallman	Sweden	123.74	11	42.52	9	81.22
9	Armen Agaian	Georgia	122.32	13	39.97	8	82.35
10	Osman Akgün	Turkey	122.11	10	42.73	10	79.38
11	Alberto Vanz	Italy	116.91	14	39.87	11	77.04
12	Manuel Leo Leitner	Germany	111.62	5	46.85	14	64.77
13	Héctor Alonso Serrano	Spain	110.72	16	37.34	12	73.38
14	Nicola Todeschini	Switzerland	103.41	12	40.72	15	62.69
15	Kamil Peteja	Poland	102.71	15	37.66	13	65.05
16	Marco Klepoch	Slovakia	101.44	7	45.97	19	55.47
17	Ivo Gatovski	Bulgaria	95.45	17	34.26	17	61.19
18	Martin Krhovják	Czech Republic	93.27	19	31.10	16	62.17
19	Krištof Brezar	Slovenia	89.67	18	33.33	18	56.34

=== Ladies ===
Rank	Name	Nation	Total points	SP		FS	
1	Maria Stavitskaia	Russia	149.14	1	54.13	1	95.01
2	Anais Ventard	France	138.73	2	46.86	2	91.87
3	Maria Katharina Herceg	Germany	120.97	3	44.28	3	76.69
4	Jana Coufalova	Czech Republic	112.57	5	41.32	5	71.25
5	Melisa Sema Atik	Turkey	111.60	9	39.59	4	72.01
6	Tanja Melanie Odermatt	Switzerland	109.62	6	40.24	7	69.38
7	Lyydia Määttänen	Finland	108.79	11	38.19	6	70.60
8	Louise Jensen	Sweden	107.32	7	39.78	9	67.54
9	Giada Russo	Italy	107.01	10	39.09	8	67.92
10	Agata Kryger	Poland	105.70	4	42.84	10	62.86
11	Krystsina Zakharanka	Belarus	100.08	8	39.64	13	60.44
12	Kristinna Vagtborg Jensen	Denmark	98.94	12	37.78	12	61.16
13	Vasilena Yasimova	Bulgaria	97.45	13	37.11	14	60.34
14	Sophie Almassy	Austria	95.85	14	35.57	15	60.28
15	Amani Fancy	United Kingdom	93.55	20	31.02	11	62.53
16	Bronislava Dobiasova	Slovakia	90.91	16	33.03	18	57.88
17	Mariya Gavrylova	Ukraine	89.58	18	31.43	17	58.15
18	Ieva Gaile	Latvia	88.81	22	30.15	16	58.66
19	Eike Langerbaur	Estonia	88.35	15	34.58	22	53.77
20	Agnes Dis Brynjarsdottir	Iceland	85.98	21	30.61	20	55.37
21	Idoia Fuentes Ugartemendia	Spain	85.43	23	29.67	19	55.76
22	Denisa Sandu	Romania	84.46	17	32.31	26	52.15
23	Naja Ferkov	Slovenia	83.99	19	31.38	23	52.61
24	Maria Christina Martinez de Haro	Andorra	82.15	24	29.63	24	52.52
25	Valentina Mikac	Croatia	78.92	27	24.71	21	54.21
26	Beatrice Meilunaite	Lithuania	78.45	26	25.99	25	52.46
27	Bianka Nikoletta Friesz	Hungary	77.17	25	28.25	27	48.92
28	Lejla Sehic	Bosnia and Herzegovina	42.18	28	15.95	28	26.23
