= Éric Bompard =

French cashmere wool goods manufacturer

Éric Bompard SA

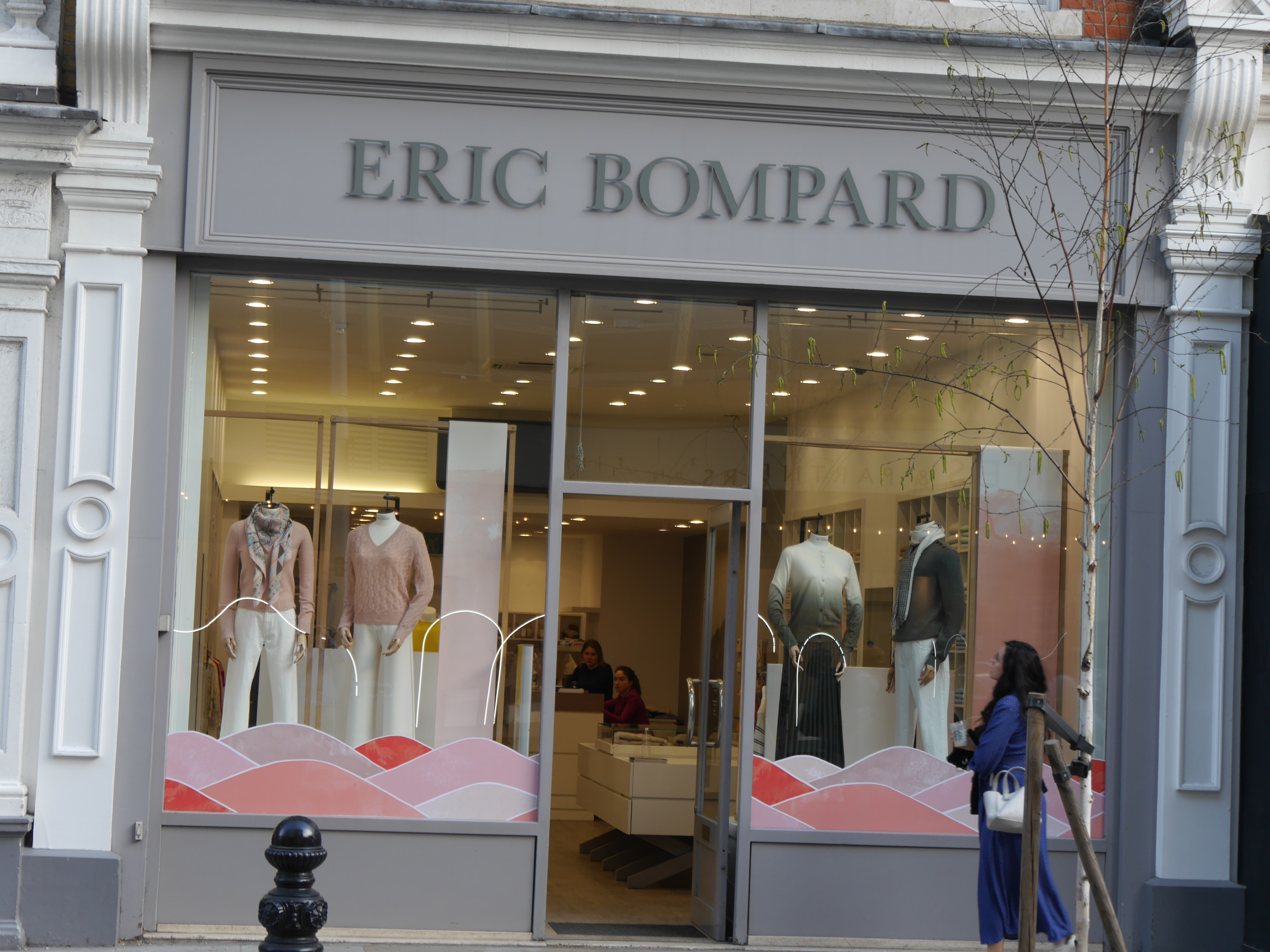
- Company type: Société Anonyme
- Industry: Retail
- Founded: 1984 - first store in Neuilly-sur-Seine; 2007 - store on the Champs-Élysées Avenue in Paris
- Founder: Éric Bompard
- Headquarters: Neuilly-sur-Seine, France
- Area served: International service
- Key people: Xavier Marie (Board Director), Barbara Werschine (Chief Executive Officer)
- Products: Clothing manufacture and retail
- Website: www.eric-bompard.com

Éric Bompard SA is a French high-fashion cashmere wool goods manufacturer established in 1984.

== History ==
Éric Bompard, an entrepreneur and former computer technician, created the company in 1984 following a trip to Asia where he learned about cashmere weaving.

In 2004, Bompard began passing over leadership to his daughter, Lorraine de Gournay, for her to later become the chief executive officer (CEO).

In 2018, Xavier Marie, the founder of Maisons du Monde, together with Apax Partners and BPI France, announced their acquisition of Éric Bompard.

The company subsequently launched an advertising campaign in late 2019, promoting its image through a "Cachemire Family".

In March 2020, Barbara Werschine was announced as the company's new CEO.
