= Roberta Rodeghiero =

Italian figure skater

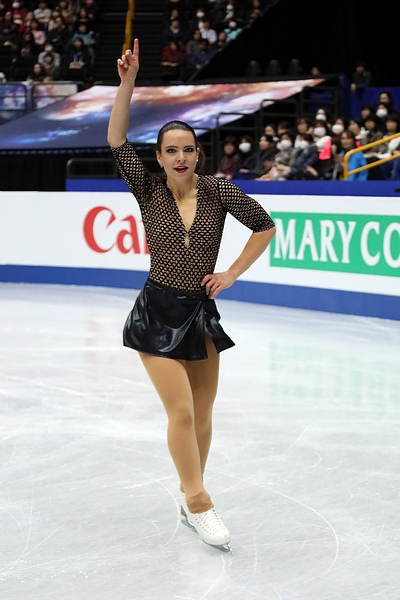
- Rodeghiero at the 2019 World Championships

Personal information
- Born: 7 April 1990 (age 36) Schio, Italy
- Home town: Asiago
- Height: 1.66 m (5 ft 5 1/2 in)

Figure skating career
- Country: Italy
- Coach: Franca Bianconi, Rosanna Murante
- Skating club: Sesto Ice Skate
- Began skating: 1998

Medal record
Italian Championships
Silver medal – second place	2015 Turin	Singles
Silver medal – second place	2016 Turin	Singles
Silver medal – second place	2017 Egna	Singles
Bronze medal – third place	2012 Courmayeur	Singles
Bronze medal – third place	2014 Merano	Singles

Roberta Rodeghiero (born 7 April 1990) is an Italian figure skater. She is the 2015 Trophee Eric Bompard bronze medalist, the 2014 CS Ondrej Nepela Trophy champion, the 2015 Lombardia Trophy champion, the 2012 Crystal Skate of Romania champion, the 2012 Egna Spring Trophy champion, and a three-time Italian national silver medalist (2015-2017).

She has competed in the final segment at six ISU Championships.

== Personal life ==
Roberta Rodeghiero was born on 7 April 1990 in Schio, Italy. As of January 2015, she was studying literature and languages at university.

== Career ==
=== Early years ===
Rodeghiero began learning to skate in 1998. She debuted on the ISU Junior Grand Prix series in 2005 and continued competing at JGP events through 2008.

=== Senior career through 2012–2013 ===
Rodeghiero made her senior international debut at the 2009 NRW Trophy. She was sent to the 2011 World Championships in Moscow but was eliminated after the preliminary round.

Her first national medal, bronze, came at the 2012 Italian Championships. She was named in Italy's team to the 2013 European Championships in Zagreb, Croatia but was eliminated after placing 27th in the short program.

=== 2013–2014 to present ===
Rodeghiero reached the free skate at an ISU Championship for the first time at the 2014 European Championships in Budapest; she ranked 15th in the short program, 9th in the free skate, and 11th overall.

The following season, Rodeghiero placed fourth at the 2014 CS Lombardia Trophy, her ISU Challenger Series debut, and won the 2014 CS Ondrej Nepela Trophy. She finished 8th at the 2015 European Championships in Stockholm and 20th at the 2015 World Championships in Shanghai.

In 2015–2016, Rodeghiero received her first Grand Prix invitations. At the 2015 Trophée Éric Bompard, she placed third in the short program; the International Skating Union deemed it to be the final result after the free skate was canceled due to the November 2015 Paris attacks. She finished 7th at the 2015 Rostelecom Cup. She later finished fifth at the European championships, her highest placing in that competition.

Rodeghiero had health problems in the 2017–2018 Olympic season. She withdrew from the Italian Championships.

== Programs ==
Season	Short program	Free skating	Exhibition
2019–2020	Always Remember Us This Way from A Star Is Born performed by Lady Gaga	Frida by Elliot Goldenthal; Poeta en el mar by Vicente Amigo	
2018–2019	Proud Mary by John Fogerty performed by Tina Turner	Frida by Elliot Goldenthal; Poeta en el mar by Vicente Amigo	
2016–2017	A levare; María de Buenos Aires by Astor Piazzolla	Non Dimenticar; L-O-V-E; Smile; It's Only a Paper Moon performed by Natalie Cole	
2015–2016	Pretty Woman; He Sleeps by James Newton Howard; Oh, Pretty Woman by Roy Orbison	Evita by Andrew Lloyd Webber	I Belong to You by Eros Ramazzotti, Anastacia
2014–2015	Let It Go performed by The Piano Guys	Evita by Andrew Lloyd Webber	
2013–2014	Valetango	Notre-Dame de Paris by Riccardo Cocciante	
2012–2013	Angel and Devil by Maxime Rodriguez	Bohemian Rhapsody; Who Wants to Live Forever by Queen both performed by Vitamin String Quartet	
2011–2012	Legends of the Fall soundtrack	Rhapsody on a Theme of Paganini	
2010–2011	Dracula (soundtrack)	Warsaw Concerto by Richard Addinsell	
2009–2010		El Conquistador by Maxime Rodriguez	

== Competitive highlights ==
GP: Grand Prix; CS: Challenger Series; JGP: Junior Grand Prix

International
Event	05–06	06–07	07–08	08–09	09–10	10–11	11–12	12–13	13–14	14–15	15–16	16–17	17–18	18–19	19–20	20–21	21–22
Worlds						31st				20th	16th			31st			
Europeans								27th	11th	8th	5th	9th					
GP Skate America												9th					
GP Skate Canada													WD				
GP France											3rd						
GP Rostelecom Cup											7th	8th					
CS Alpen Trophy														6th			
CS Budapest																WD	
CS Cup of Austria																	27th
CS Cup of Tyrol																C	
CS Denkova-Staviski											4th						
CS Golden Spin										14th					10th		WD
CS Lombardia										4th		4th					
CS Ondrej Nepela										1st	8th				10th		
CS Warsaw Cup												8th					
Bavarian Open							2nd	9th						4th			
Coupe du Printemps							9th										
Crystal Skate								1st									
Cup of Nice							12th										
Cup of Tyrol														5th			
Denkova-Staviski Cup								3rd	1st								
Dragon Trophy															1st		
Egna Trophy							1st	7th						WD		2nd	
Golden Bear								3rd									
Hellmut Seibt									1st	2nd							
Ice Challenge									4th								
Lombardia Trophy									4th		1st						
Merano Cup						15th			4th								5th
Mont Blanc					4th	3rd											
Nordics															8th		
NRW Trophy					14th	16th	8th										
Ondrej Nepela						6th	8th	6th	12th								
Shanghai Trophy															6th		
Sportland Trophy											1st						
Toruń Cup														8th			
Triglav Trophy						7th	9th										
Volvo Open Cup															12th		
Winter Universiade						6th		8th		5th		6th					
International: Junior
JGP Bulgaria	17th																
JGP Germany			15th														
JGP Italy				13th													
JGP Romania		13th															
JGP Spain				7th													
Dragon Trophy	10th																
Egna Spring Trophy	8th	7th															
Merano Cup	1st		2nd														
NRW Trophy				1st													
National
Italian Champ.		7th	4th	5th	6th		3rd	4th	3rd	2nd	2nd	2nd		6th	WD	5th	
Team events
Team Challenge Cup											2nd T 9th P						
World Team Trophy														6th T 11th P			
