= Alaine Chartrand =

Canadian figure skater

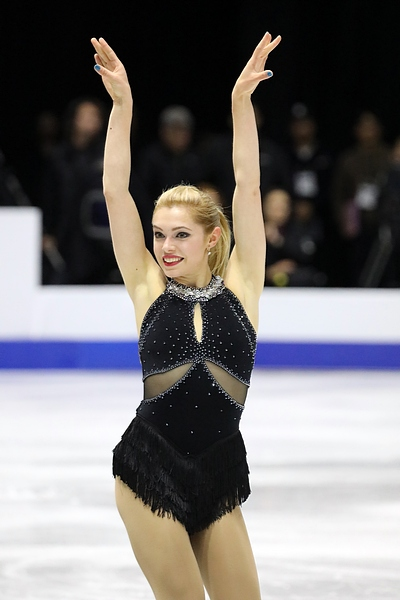
- Chartrand at the 2016 Skate Canada

Personal information
- Born: March 26, 1996 (age 30) Brockville, Ontario
- Home town: Prescott, Ontario
- Height: 1.56 m (5 ft 1 1/2 in)

Figure skating career
- Country: Canada
- Began skating: 1999
- Retired: May 26, 2021

Alaine Chartrand (French pronunciation: [a.lɛn ʃaʁ.tʁɑ̃]; born March 26, 1996) is a Canadian former competitive figure skater. She is the 2014 Rostelecom Cup bronze medallist, the 2016 CS Autumn Classic silver medallist, and a two-time Canadian national champion (2016, 2019).

== Personal life ==
Alaine Chartrand was born on March 26, 1996, in Brockville, Ontario. She is the daughter of Heather and John Chartrand, and has a brother, Andrew. She attended Thousand Islands Secondary School, graduating in 2014.

In 2018, Chartrand began studying as a kinesiology student at York University in Toronto. The following year she transferred to the University of British Columbia in Vancouver.

== Career ==
=== Early years ===
Chartrand began learning to skate in 1999. Mary Jayne Rashotte became her coach when she was four years old.

=== 2012–2013 season ===
Chartrand debuted on the ISU Junior Grand Prix series in autumn 2012. After winning the senior bronze medal at the 2013 Canadian Championships, she was sent to the 2013 World Junior Championships in Milan, Italy, where she finished eighth.

=== 2013–2014 season ===
In 2014, Chartrand ranked fifth at the Canadian Championships and was named in Canada's team to the Four Continents Championships. Making her senior international debut, she placed seventh in Taipei, Taiwan. She then came in fifth at the 2014 World Junior Championships in Sofia, Bulgaria.

=== 2014–2015 season ===
As of August 2014, Chartrand's coaches included Leonid Birinberg at the Nepean Skating Club in Nepean, Ontario; Michelle Leigh at the Oakville Skating Club in Oakville, Mariposa in Barrie, or Canadian Ice Academy; and Rashotte at the Prescott Figure Skating Club in Prescott. She was also coached by Brian Orser at the Toronto Cricket, Skating and Curling Club in Toronto, Ontario and worked with Gary Beacom on footwork. Chartrand debuted on the senior Grand Prix series at the 2014 Skate Canada International, finishing seventh. At the 2014 Rostelecom Cup, she obtained her first GP medal, bronze, having placed first in the short program and third in the free skate.

Chartrand competed at the 2015 Canadian Championships where she won the silver medal. She was named to Canada's world team and finished in eleventh place at the 2015 World Championships in Shanghai, China, thus securing two spots for Canadian women at the 2016 World Championships. Chartrand closed her season by finishing eleventh at 2015 World Team Trophy where Team Canada finished fourth overall.

=== 2015–2016 season ===
Chartrand began her season on the ISU Challenger Series, placing 4th at the 2015 Nebelhorn Trophy. Assigned to two Grand Prix events, she finished twelfth at the 2015 Skate America and then 6th at the 2015 Rostelecom Cup. She placed second in both segments at the 2016 Canadian Championships in Halifax, Nova Scotia, and won the gold medal by a margin of four points over Gabrielle Daleman and Kaetlyn Osmond.

At the 2016 Four Continents Championships in Taipei, Chartrand placed seventh in the short, fourteenth in the free, and eleventh overall. She finished seventeenth at the 2016 World Championships in Boston, having ranked seventeenth in both segments.

=== 2016–2017 season ===
Chartrand began her season with a silver medal behind Mirai Nagasu at the 2016 CS Autumn Classic International, having placed sixth in the short program and first in the free skate. Competing on the Grand Prix series, she finished fifth at the 2016 Skate Canada International and tenth at the 2016 NHK Trophy.

She received the bronze medal at the 2017 Canadian Championships and finished eleventh at the 2017 Four Continents Championships in Gangneung, South Korea. She was coached by Michelle Leigh and Brian Orser in Ottawa and Toronto.

=== 2017–2018 season ===
Chartrand decided to train primarily in Oakville, Ontario, coached by Michelle Leigh, and to travel occasionally to Colorado Springs, Colorado, to train under Christy Krall. Chartrand placed fifth at the 2017 CS Autumn Classic International, and then eleventh at both of her Grand Prix events for the season, Skate Canada International and the NHK Trophy.

Chartrand's greatest disappointment came at the 2018 Canadian Championships, where the Canadian delegation to the 2018 Winter Olympics would be decided, with three spots available for ladies' singles skaters. She placed ninth in the short program and fourth in the free skate, to finish fourth overall. Chartrand completed only one of her allowed three combinations in the free skate, and finished only 5.41 points behind bronze medallist Larkyn Austman. She remarked afterward "I definitely left points out there. I skated better in my practiced this morning than I competed." As a result, she was not selected for the Winter Olympics team.

Chartrand finished her season at the 2018 Four Continents Championships, where she finished eighth. She would later admit to having avoided coverage of the Olympics, and vacationed in Maui instead.

In June 2018, Chartrand decided to train at the York Region Skating Academy, coached by Tracey Wainman and Grzegorz Filipowski.

=== 2018–2019 season ===
Chartrand began the season at the Nebelhorn Trophy, where she finished eighth. Competing on the Grand Prix in consecutive weeks, she placed ninth at Skate America and eighth at Skate Canada International.

At the 2019 Canadian Championships, Chartrand placed fifth in the short program after an error on her attempted triple Lutz-triple toe loop combination. She went on to win the free skate, and the title overall, her second. Speaking afterward, she said "I think just not having those high expectations on myself and just wanting to finish happy has been a different mindset and helps have a good performance." She was assigned to the Canadian teams for the Four Continents and World Championships.

At Four Continents, Chartrand fared very poorly in the short program, doubling all three of her planned triple jumps and ending up in twenty-first place. Speaking afterward, she said that she had felt "really uncomfortable" on the ice that day. She finished thirteenth in the free skate, climbing to sixteenth place overall. Chartrand went on to place twenty-third at the World Championships, and then concluded the season as part of Team Canada at the 2019 World Team Trophy.

=== After 2018-2019 ===
On July 4, 2019, Chartrand announced that she would not participate in the fall competitions, and was uncertain about returning to competitive skating.

Skate Canada announced Chartrand's retirement on May 26, 2021. She indicated that while she had considered a return to competition, the onset of the COVID-19 pandemic and other off-ice commitments led to her decision to retire.

== Programs ==
Season	Short program	Free skating	Exhibition
2018–2019	Paint It Black by Ramin Djawadi choreo. by David Wilson	Sunset Boulevard by Andrew Lloyd Webber choreo. by David Wilson	
2017–2018	Libertango by Astor Piazzolla choreo. by Shae-Lynn Bourne	Sunset Boulevard by Andrew Lloyd Webber choreo. by David Wilson	Little Swing by AronChupa
2016–2017	Lilies of the Valley (from Pina) by Jun Miyake choreo. by Shae-Lynn Bourne; Sway performed by The Pussycat Dolls choreo. by Shae-Lynn Bourne	Rome by Jeff Beal choreo. by David Wilson	These Boots Are Made for Walkin' by Nancy Sinatra
2015–2016	Lilies of the Valley (from Pina) by Jun Miyake choreo. by Shae-Lynn Bourne	Gone with the Wind by Max Steiner choreo. by David Wilson	A Little Party Never Killed Nobody (All We Got) by Fergie
2014–2015	La Leyenda del Beso by Reveriano Soutullo, Juan Vert choreo. by David Wilson	Doctor Zhivago by Maurice Jarre choreo. by David Wilson	Funkytown by Lipps Inc.
2013–2014	Torn - Resolve Compilation by Nathan Lanier choreo. by Jeffrey Buttle	Doctor Zhivago by Maurice Jarre choreo. by David Wilson	Funkytown by Lipps Inc.
2012–2013	First Dance by Edvin Marton	Compilation Misa Tango by Luis Bacalov	Stronger (What Doesn't Kill You) by Kelly Clarkson

== Competitive highlights ==
GP: Grand Prix; CS: Challenger Series; JGP: Junior Grand Prix

International
Event	10–11	11–12	12–13	13–14	14–15	15–16	16–17	17–18	18–19
Worlds					11th	17th			23rd
Four Continents				7th	10th	11th	11th	8th	16th
GP NHK Trophy							10th	11th	
GP Rostelecom Cup					3rd	6th			
GP Skate America						12th			9th
GP Skate Canada					7th		5th	11th	8th
CS Autumn Classic							2nd	5th	
CS Nebelhorn						4th			8th
CS U.S. Classic					4th				
International: Junior
Junior Worlds			8th	5th					
JGP Belarus				7th					
JGP Croatia			6th						
JGP Latvia				4th					
JGP U.S.			7th						
National
Canadian Champ.	10th J	9th	3rd	5th	2nd	1st	3rd	4th	1st
Team events
World Team; Trophy					4th T 11th P		4th T 10th P		5th P 12th P
J = Junior level; WD = Withdrew; T = Team result; P = Personal result. Medals awarded for team result only.

== Detailed results ==
2018–19 season
Date	Event	SP	FS	Total
April 11–14, 2019	2019 World Team Trophy	11; 52.36	12; 94.91	5T/12P; 147.27
March 18–24, 2019	2019 World Championships	22; 55.89	23; 93.08	23; 148.97
February 7–10, 2019	2019 Four Continents Championships	21; 45.89	13; 101.65	16; 147.54
January 13–20, 2019	2019 Canadian Championships	5; 59.22	1; 126.69	1; 185.91
October 26–28, 2018	2018 Skate Canada International	8; 60.47	8; 111.70	8; 172.17
October 19–21, 2018	2018 Skate America	11; 46.99	7; 108.50	9; 155.49
September 27–29, 2018	2018 CS Nebelhorn Trophy	8; 53.60	8; 96.42	8; 150.02
2017–18 season
Date	Event	SP	FS	Total
January 22–28, 2018	2018 Four Continents Championships	8; 59.86	6; 112.55	8; 172.41
January 8–14, 2018	2018 Canadian Championships	9; 52.19	4; 112.02	4; 164.21
November 10–12, 2017	2017 NHK Trophy	12; 49.60	9; 109.76	11; 159.36
September 20–23, 2017	2017 CS Autumn Classic	6; 55.21	6; 107.21	5; 162.42
2016–17 season
Date	Event	SP	FS	Total
April 20–23, 2017	2017 World Team Trophy	10; 59.13	11; 107.15	4T/10P; 166.28
February 15–19, 2017	2017 Four Continents Championships	14; 53.64	8; 113.48	11; 167.12
January 16–22, 2016	2017 Canadian Championships	3; 67.41	3; 114.66	3; 182.07
November 25–27, 2016	2016 NHK Trophy	8; 58.72	11; 101.50	10; 160.22
October 28–30, 2016	2016 Skate Canada International	6; 62.15	4; 123.41	5; 185.56
September 28– Oct 1, 2016	2016 CS Autumn Classic International	6; 56.61	1; 129.50	2; 186.11
2015–16 season
March 28 – April 3, 2016	2016 World Championships	17; 55.67	17; 102.15	17; 157.82
February 16–21, 2016	2016 Four Continents Championships	7; 59.71	14; 106.02	11; 165.73
January 18–24, 2016	2016 Canadian Championships	2; 68.81	2; 133.18	1; 201.99
November 20–22, 2015	2015 Rostelecom Cup	2; 67.38	7; 106.04	6; 173.42
October 23–25, 2015	2015 Skate America	6; 59.40	12; 88.80	12; 148.20
September 24–26, 2015	2015 Nebelhorn Trophy	2; 58.73	5; 102.62	4; 161.35
2014–15 season
Date	Event	SP	FS	Total
April 16–19, 2015	2015 World Team Trophy	9; 54.64	11; 81.90	4T/11P; 136.54
March 23–29, 2015	2015 World Championships	10; 60.24	12; 100.94	11; 161.18
February 9–15, 2015	2015 Four Continents Championships	6; 58.50	10; 102.72	10; 161.22
January 19–25, 2015	2015 Canadian Championships	3; 60.25	1; 123.99	2; 184.24
November 14–16, 2014	2014 Rostelecom Cup	1; 61.18	3; 110.82	3; 172.00
October 31 – November 2, 2014	2014 Skate Canada International	7; 57.06	7; 99.16	7; 156.22
September 11–14, 2014	2014 U.S. Classic	4; 58.35	4; 103.30	4; 161.65

2013–14 season
Date	Event	Level	SP	FS	Total
March 10–16, 2014	2014 World Junior Championships	Junior	7; 54.68	5; 109.67	5; 164.35
January 20–26, 2014	2014 Four Continents Championships	Senior	15; 52.14	5; 113.05	7; 165.19
January 9–15, 2014	2014 Canadian Championships	Senior	5; 53.89	4; 107.57	5; 161.46
September 25–28, 2013	2013 JGP Belarus	Junior	6; 49.60	6; 91.49	7; 141.09
August 28–31, 2013	2013 JGP Latvia	Junior	6; 49.60	3; 97.35	4; 146.95
2012–13 season
Date	Event	Level	SP	FS	Total
February 25 – March 3, 2013	2013 World Junior Championships	Junior	12; 48.14	7; 96.24	8; 144.38
January 13–20, 2013	2013 Canadian Championships	Senior	6; 50.76	3; 106.46	3; 157.22
October 3–6, 2012	2012 JGP Croatia	Junior	4; 47.62	6; 90.10	6; 137.72
August 29 – September 1, 2012	2012 JGP United States	Junior	9; 43.42	6; 90.01	7; 133.43
2011–12 season
Date	Event	Level	SP	FS	Total
January 16–22, 2012	2012 Canadian Championships	Senior	15; 39.45	7; 89.32	9; 128.77
