= Viktoria Kavaliova =

Belarusian ice dancer

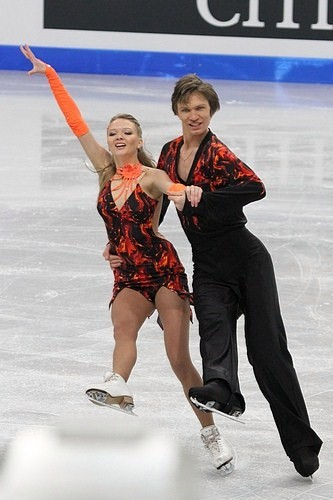
- Kavaliova/Bieliaiev in 2012

Personal information
- Other names: Viktoria Kavaleva
- Born: 9 July 1994 (age 32) Minsk, Belarus
- Home town: Minsk
- Height: 1.71 m (5 ft 7 1/2 in)

Figure skating career
- Country: Belarus
- Partner: Yurii Bieliaiev
- Coach: Nikolai Morozov, Alexei Gorshkov, Tatiana Bieliaeva
- Skating club: RCOP Minsk
- Began skating: 2001
- Retired: 2018

Viktoria Uladzimirauna Kavaliova (born 9 July 1994) is a Belarusian former competitive ice dancer. With partner Yurii Bieliaiev, she has won two medals on the ISU Challenger Series and two national titles. They have competed in the final segment at four ISU Championships – 2012 Junior Worlds in Minsk, Belarus; 2014 Junior Worlds in Sofia, Bulgaria; 2016 Europeans in Bratislava, Slovakia; and 2017 Europeans in Ostrava, Czech Republic.

== Programs ==
(with Bieliaiev)

Season	Short dance	Free dance
2017–2018	Bachata: Te Extraño by Xtreme; Salsa: Crystal Fusion by Deseo	And the Waltz Goes On by Anthony Hopkins performed by André Rieu
2016–2017	Blues: Way Down We Go by Kaleo; Jive	The Man from U.N.C.L.E.
2015–2016	Waltz: Flashlights; March: Russian March	Troy by James Horner
2014–2015	Flamenco; Paso Doble	Illumination; Secrets; Illumination by Jennifer Thomas (pianist)
2013–2014	Foxtrot: Lazy River by Michael Bublé; Quickstep: Creep by Richard Cheese	Tea Party by Kerli; Follow Me Down by 30H!3 feat. Neon Hitch; Her Name Is Alice by Shinedown
2012–2013	Senior level: Polka; Junior level: Summertime by Tim Gonzalez; Swing	I Would Do Anything for Love by Meatloaf
2011–2012	I'm Not Giving You Up by Gloria Estefan; Smooth by Santana	Tango Criminale
2010–2011	The Bodyguard; Student's Heart	Love & Dance
2009–2010	Belarusian polka	Rock'n'roll medley

== Competitive highlights ==
GP: Grand Prix; CS: Challenger Series; JGP: Junior Grand Prix

With Bieliaiev

International
Event	07–08	08–09	09–10	10–11	11–12	12–13	13–14	14–15	15–16	16–17	17–18
Worlds						29th	32nd	28th	28th	27th	28th
Europeans							28th	25th	16th	20th	20th
GP Rostelecom									7th	10th	
GP Trophée										10th	
CS DS Cup									2nd		
CS Ice Star											WD
CS Mordovian									5th		
CS Nebelhorn										8th	11th
CS Ondrej Nepela											9th
CS Volvo Cup								2nd			
Ice Star								3rd	2nd		
Open d'Andorra											4th
International: Junior
Junior Worlds				23rd	19th	21st	15th				
JGP Austria						11th					
JGP Belarus		11th	11th				5th				
JGP Czech Rep.		15th		11th							
JGP Estonia							6th				
JGP France						9th					
JGP Hungary			16th								
JGP Poland					8th						
JGP Romania				9th							
Ice Star						1st J	2nd J				
NRW Trophy		1st N	11th J								
Pavel Roman				9th J	2nd J		1st J				
Santa Claus Cup						6th J					
Volvo Open Cup						2nd J					
National
Belarusian	5th				2nd	2nd		1st			
Levels: N = Novice; J = Junior; WD = Withdrew
