= Yurii Bieliaiev =

Belarusian ice dancer

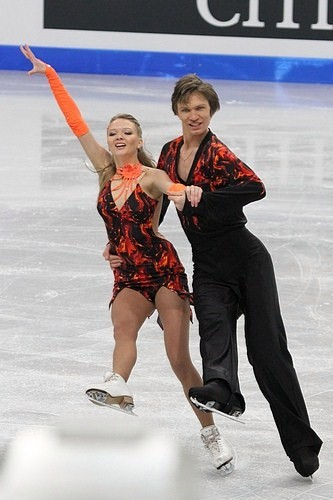
- Kavaliova/Bieliaiev in 2012

Personal information
- Other names: Yirii Bieliaiev
- Born: 4 November 1992 (age 33) Odesa, Ukraine
- Home town: Minsk, Belarus
- Height: 1.95 m (6 ft 5 in)

Figure skating career
- Country: Belarus
- Partner: Viktoria Kavaliova
- Coach: Nikolai Morozov, Alexei Gorshkov, Tatiana Bieliaeva
- Skating club: RCOP Minsk
- Began skating: 1996
- Retired: 2018

Yurii Bieliaiev (born 4 November 1992) is a Belarusian former competitive ice dancer. With partner Viktoria Kavaliova, he has won two medals on the ISU Challenger Series and two national titles. They have competed in the final segment at four ISU Championships – 2012 Junior Worlds in Minsk, Belarus; 2014 Junior Worlds in Sofia, Bulgaria; 2016 Europeans in Bratislava, Slovakia; and 2017 Europeans in Ostrava, Czech Republic.

== Programs ==
(with Kavaliova)

| Season | Short dance | Free dance |
|---|---|---|
| 2017–2018 | Bachata: Te Extraño by Xtreme; Salsa: Crystal Fusion by Deseo | And the Waltz Goes On by Anthony Hopkins performed by André Rieu |
| 2016–2017 | Blues: Way Down We Go by Kaleo; Jive | The Man from U.N.C.L.E. |
| 2015–2016 | Waltz: Flashlights; March: Russian March | Troy by James Horner |
| 2014–2015 | Flamenco; Paso Doble | Illumination; Secrets; Illumination by Jennifer Thomas (pianist) |
| 2013–2014 | Foxtrot: Lazy River by Michael Bublé; Quickstep: Creep by Richard Cheese | Tea Party by Kerli; Follow Me Down by 30H!3 feat. Neon Hitch; Her Name Is Alice by Shinedown |
| 2012–2013 | Senior level: Polka; Junior level: Summertime by Tim Gonzalez; Swing | I Would Do Anything for Love by Meatloaf |
| 2011–2012 | I'm Not Giving You Up by Gloria Estefan; Smooth by Santana | Tango Criminale |
| 2010–2011 | The Bodyguard; Student's Heart | Love & Dance |
| 2009–2010 | Belarusian polka | Rock'n'roll medley |

== Competitive highlights ==
GP: Grand Prix; CS: Challenger Series; JGP: Junior Grand Prix

With Kavaliova

International
| Event | 07–08 | 08–09 | 09–10 | 10–11 | 11–12 | 12–13 | 13–14 | 14–15 | 15–16 | 16–17 | 17–18 |
|---|---|---|---|---|---|---|---|---|---|---|---|
| Worlds | | | | | | 29th | 32nd | 28th | 28th | 27th | 28th |
| Europeans | | | | | | | 28th | 25th | 16th | 20th | 20th |
| GP Rostelecom | | | | | | | | | 7th | 10th | |
| GP Trophée | | | | | | | | | | 10th | |
| CS DS Cup | | | | | | | | | 2nd | | |
| CS Ice Star | | | | | | | | | | | WD |
| CS Mordovian | | | | | | | | | 5th | | |
| CS Nebelhorn | | | | | | | | | | 8th | 11th |
| CS Ondrej Nepela | | | | | | | | | | | 9th |
| CS Volvo Cup | | | | | | | | 2nd | | | |
| Ice Star | | | | | | | | 3rd | 2nd | | |
| Open d'Andorra | | | | | | | | | | | 4th |
International: Junior
| Junior Worlds | | | | 23rd | 19th | 21st | 15th | | | | |
| JGP Austria | | | | | | 11th | | | | | |
| JGP Belarus | | 11th | 11th | | | | 5th | | | | |
| JGP Czech Rep. | | 15th | | 11th | | | | | | | |
| JGP Estonia | | | | | | | 6th | | | | |
| JGP France | | | | | | 9th | | | | | |
| JGP Hungary | | | 16th | | | | | | | | |
| JGP Poland | | | | | 8th | | | | | | |
| JGP Romania | | | | 9th | | | | | | | |
| Ice Star | | | | | | 1st J | 2nd J | | | | |
| NRW Trophy | | 1st N | 11th J | | | | | | | | |
| Pavel Roman | | | | 9th J | 2nd J | | 1st J | | | | |
| Santa Claus Cup | | | | | | 6th J | | | | | |
| Volvo Open Cup | | | | | | 2nd J | | | | | |
National
| Belarusian | 5th | | | | 2nd | 2nd | | 1st | | | |
Levels: N = Novice; J = Junior; WD = Withdrew
