= 2015 CS U.S. International Figure Skating Classic =

- Type: ISU Challenger Series
- Date: September 16 – 20
- Season: 2015–16
- Location: Salt Lake City, Utah, USA
- Venue: Salt Lake City Sports Complex
- Previous: 2014 U.S. Classic
- Next: 2016 U.S. Classic

The 2015 CS U.S. International Figure Skating Classic was a senior international figure skating competition held in September 2015 at the Salt Lake City Sports Complex in Salt Lake City, Utah. It was part of the 2015–16 ISU Challenger Series. Medals were awarded in the disciplines of men's singles, ladies' singles, pair skating, and ice dancing.

== Entries ==
Country	Men	Ladies	Pairs	Ice dance
Australia	Andrew Dodds; Jordan Dodds	Brooklee Han	Paris Stephens / Matthew Dodds	Emily Pike / Patrick Adderley
Brazil		Isadora Williams		
Canada	Christophe Belley-Lemelin	Véronik Mallet; Selena Zhao	Vanessa Grenier / Maxime Deschamps; Kirsten Moore-Towers / Michael Marinaro	Brianna Delmaestro / Timothy Lum; Élisabeth Paradis / François-Xavier Ouellette
Chinese Taipei		Amy Lin		
Denmark				Laurence Fournier Beaudry / Nikolaj Sørensen
Estonia		Johanna Allik		
Finland	Bela Papp			
Hong Kong	Leslie Ip	Maisy Hiu Ching Ma; Tiffany Chitring Yim		
Israel	Oleksii Bychenko; Daniel Samohin	Aimee Buchanan; Katarina Kulgeyko; Netta Schreiber	Adel Tankova / Evgeni Krasnopolski	Kimberly Berkovich / Ronald Zilberberg
Italy	Carlo Vittorio Palermo			
Japan	Shoma Uno; Keiji Tanaka	Satoko Miyahara; Kanako Murakami		
Kazakhstan		Elizabet Tursynbayeva		
Latvia	Lukas Kaugars			
Lithuania				Taylor Tran / Saulius Ambrulevičius
Philippines		Frances Clare Untalan		
Spain	Javier Raya	Sonia Lafuente		
Switzerland		Yasmine Kimiko Yamada		
Ukraine	Yaroslav Paniot			Oleksandra Nazarova / Maxim Nikitin
United States	Timothy Dolensky; Richard Dornbush; Ross Miner	Mariah Bell; Karen Chen; Angela Wang	Marissa Castelli / Mervin Tran; Gretchen Donlan / Nathan Bartholomay; Tarah Kayne / Daniel O'Shea	Madison Hubbell / Zachary Donohue; Danielle Thomas / Daniel Eaton

== Results ==
=== Medal summary ===
Discipline	Gold	Silver	Bronze
Men	(Israel) Daniel Samohin	(Japan) Keiji Tanaka	(United States) Ross Miner
Ladies	(Japan) Satoko Miyahara	(Kazakhstan) Elizabet Tursynbayeva	(United States) Angela Wang
Pairs	(United States) Tarah Kayne / Daniel O'Shea	(United States) Marissa Castelli / Mervin Tran	(Canada) Kirsten Moore-Towers / Michael Marinaro
Ice dancing	(United States) Madison Hubbell / Zachary Donohue	(Denmark) Laurence Fournier Beaudry / Nikolaj Sørensen	(Canada) Élisabeth Paradis / François-Xavier Ouellette

=== Men ===
Rank	Name	Nation	Total	SP		FS	
1	Daniel Samohin	Israel	223.67	3	71.52	2	152.15
2	Keiji Tanaka	Japan	212.34	5	66.54	3	145.80
3	Ross Miner	United States	209.93	1	74.66	5	135.27
4	Timothy Dolensky	United States	209.04	4	69.18	4	139.86
5	Shoma Uno	Japan	207.41	9	52.45	1	154.96
6	Richard Dornbush	United States	191.02	6	65.33	6	125.69
7	Oleksii Bychenko	Israel	183.09	2	72.60	7	110.49
8	Christophe Belley-Lemelin	Canada	164.21	8	58.12	8	106.09
9	Andrew Dodds	Australia	159.77	7	59.59	9	100.18
10	Bela Papp	Finland	147.60	10	54.04	10	97.56
11	Lukas Kaugars	Latvia	135.61	11	49.62	12	85.99
12	Leslie Ip	Hong Kong	135.34	13	42.37	11	92.97
13	Carlo Vittorio Palermo	Italy	125.42	12	47.05	13	78.37
14	Javier Raya	Spain	116.11	14	40.34	14	75.77
15	Jordan Dodds	Australia	113.79	15	38.39	15	75.40
WD	Yaroslav Paniot	Ukraine	-	16	37.45	-	-

=== Ladies ===
Rank	Name	Nation	Total	SP		FS	
1	Satoko Miyahara	Japan	183.64	1	63.48	1	120.16
2	Elizabet Tursynbayeva	Kazakhstan	177.91	4	59.66	2	118.25
3	Angela Wang	United States	166.80	2	61.31	4	105.49
4	Karen Chen	United States	159.18	3	60.94	5	98.24
5	Selena Zhao	Canada	157.03	9	50.77	3	106.26
6	Mariah Bell	United States	149.47	6	55.03	6	94.44
7	Kanako Murakami	Japan	147.60	5	55.58	8	92.02
8	Amy Lin	Chinese Taipei	144.62	7	52.52	7	92.11
9	Véronik Mallet	Canada	141.94	8	51.77	10	90.17
10	Brooklee Han	Australia	140.54	10	50.25	9	90.29
11	Maisy Hiu Ching Ma	Hong Kong	120.90	11	45.21	12	75.69
12	Katarina Kulgeyko	Israel	118.29	14	40.47	11	77.82
13	Aimee Buchanan	Israel	116.06	13	42.89	14	73.17
14	Isadora Williams	Brazil	114.13	15	39.02	13	75.11
15	Yasmine Kimiko Yamada	Switzerland	110.83	16	38.51	15	72.32
16	Frances Clare Untalan	Philippines	106.28	12	44.14	16	62.14
17	Johanna Allik	Estonia	93.11	17	34.27	17	58.84
18	Tiffany Chitring Yim	Hong Kong	64.53	19	20.53	18	44.00
WD	Netta Schreiber	Israel	-	18	26.78	-	-
WD	Sonia Lafuente	Spain	-	-	-	-	-

=== Pairs ===
Rank	Name	Nation	Total	SP		FS	
1	Tarah Kayne / Daniel O'Shea	United States	170.30	3	54.30	1	116.00
2	Marissa Castelli / Mervin Tran	United States	169.46	1	60.24	2	109.22
3	Kirsten Moore-Towers / Michael Marinaro	Canada	160.08	2	57.22	3	102.86
4	Vanessa Grenier / Maxime Deschamps	Canada	148.52	5	46.64	4	101.88
5	Gretchen Donlan / Nathan Bartholomay	United States	144.86	4	52.40	5	92.46
6	Adel Tankova / Evgeni Krasnopolski	Israel	101.74	6	36.44	6	65.30
7	Paris Stephens / Matthew Dodds	Australia	80.44	7	24.60	7	55.84

=== Ice dancing ===
Rank	Name	Nation	Total	SD		FD	
1	Madison Hubbell / Zachary Donohue	United States	153.62	1	61.08	1	92.54
2	Laurence Fournier Beaudry / Nikolaj Sørensen	Denmark	141.08	3	51.58	2	89.50
3	Élisabeth Paradis / François-Xavier Ouellette	Canada	136.90	2	51.58	3	85.32
4	Oleksandra Nazarova / Maxim Nikitin	Ukraine	122.18	5	48.40	4	73.78
5	Danielle Thomas / Daniel Eaton	United States	120.62	4	51.22	5	69.40
6	Brianna Delmaestro / Timothy Lum	Canada	111.46	6	45.46	6	66.00
7	Kimberly Berkovich / Ronald Zilberberg	Israel	99.18	8	39.46	7	59.72
8	Taylor Tran / Saulius Ambrulevičius	Lithuania	93.54	7	39.52	8	54.02
9	Emily Pike / Patrick Adderley	Australia	78.02	9	29.28	9	48.74
