= 2016 World Figure Skating Championships =

Annual figure skating competition held in 2016

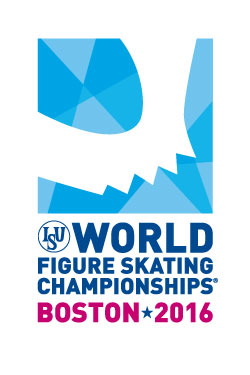
- Official logo
- Type: ISU Championship
- Date: 28 March – 3 April
- Season: 2015–16
- Location: Boston, USA
- Host: U.S. Figure Skating
- Venue: TD Garden

Champions
- Men's singles: (Spain) Javier Fernández
- Ladies' singles: (Russia) Evgenia Medvedeva
- Pairs: (Canada) Meagan Duhamel / Eric Radford
- Ice dance: (France) Gabriella Papadakis / Guillaume Cizeron
- Previous: 2015 World Championships
- Next: 2017 World Championships

The 2016 ISU World Figure Skating Championships took place March 28 – April 3, 2016 in Boston, Massachusetts. Figure skaters competed for the title of World champion in men's singles, ladies' singles, pairs and ice dancing. This marked the first time Boston was host to the World Figure Skating Championships. The competition determined the number of athlete slots for each federation at the 2017 World Championships.

== Background ==
The World Figure Skating Championships is the sport's most important annual competition sanctioned by the International Skating Union (ISU). In June 2013, the city of Boston was announced as the host city of the 2016 event. The competition was organized by U.S. Figure Skating, and the Skating Club of Boston served as the local organizing committee. Founded in 1912, it is the third-oldest skating club in the United States and is a founding member of U.S. Figure Skating.

== Venues ==
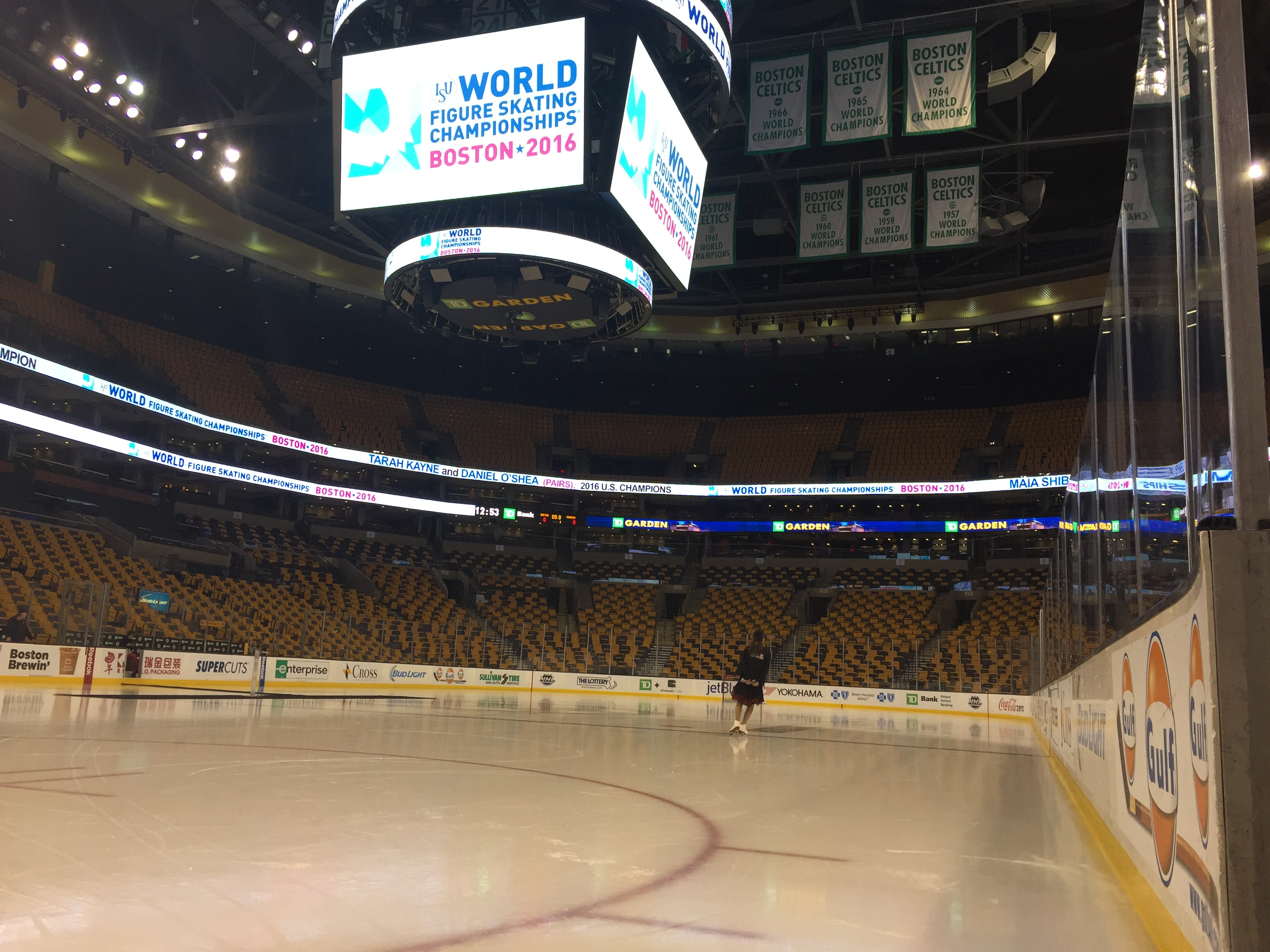
2016 ISU World Figure Skating Championships media day at TD Garden

The TD Garden was the primary arena for the 2016 ISU World Figure Skating Championships. The venue hosted all competitions and several practice sessions. The second official practice venue for the event was DCR Steriti Rink.

=== TD Garden ===
The TD Garden is a multipurpose arena located in Boston, Massachusetts. The arena hosted a maximum capacity of approximately 15,000 seats for the event. The TD Garden also serves as the home arena for two of Boston's professional sports teams, the Boston Celtics and the Boston Bruins.

=== DCR Steriti Rink ===
DCR Steriti Rink is a local area rink managed by the Massachusetts Department of Conservation and Recreation. It is located in the North End neighborhood of Boston and is a short distance from the main venue. This rink served as the practice venue and was open only to credentialed participants of the event.

== Records ==
The following new ISU best scores were set during this competition:

Event	Component	Skaters	Score	Date	Ref
Ice dancing	Free dance	(France) Gabriella Papadakis / Guillaume Cizeron	118.17	31 March 2016	
Ladies	Free skate	(Russia) Evgenia Medvedeva	150.10	2 April 2016	

Argentina was represented by a skater at the ISU World Championships for the first time in history.

== Qualification ==
Skaters were eligible for the event if they represented an ISU member nations and had reached the age of 15 before 1 July 2015 in their place of birth. National associations selected their entries according to their own criteria but the ISU mandated that their selections achieved a minimum technical elements score (TES) at an international event prior to the World Championships.

=== Minimum TES ===
Minimum technical scores (TES)
Discipline	SP / SD	FS / FD
Men	34	64
Ladies	27	47
Pairs	25	43
Ice dance	29	39
Must be achieved at an ISU-recognized international event in the ongoing or preceding season. SP and FS scores may be attained at different events.

=== Number of entries per discipline ===
Based on the results of the 2015 World Championships, each ISU member nation can field one to three entries per discipline.

Spots	Men	Ladies	Pairs	Dance
3	Spain; United States	Russia; Japan; United States	Canada; China; Russia	France; United States; Canada
2	Japan; Kazakhstan; Canada; Uzbekistan; Russia; France; China	China; France; Canada; South Korea	United States; France; Italy	Italy; Russia
If not listed above, one entry is allowed.

== Entries ==
Member nations began announcing their selections in December 2015. The ISU published a complete list of entries on March 8, 2016.

Country	Men	Ladies	Pairs	Ice dancing
Argentina	Denis Margalik			
Armenia	Slavik Hayrapetyan	Anastasia Galustyan		Tina Garabedian / Simon Proulx-Sénécal
Australia	Brendan Kerry	Kailani Craine		
Austria		Kerstin Frank	Miriam Ziegler / Severin Kiefer	Barbora Silná / Juri Kurakin
Belarus			Tatiana Danilova / Mikalai Kamianchuk	Viktoria Kavaliova / Yurii Bieliaiev
Belgium	Jorik Hendrickx			
Canada	Patrick Chan; Nam Nguyen	Alaine Chartrand; Gabrielle Daleman	Meagan Duhamel / Eric Radford; Lubov Iliushechkina / Dylan Moscovitch; Kirsten Moore-Towers / Michael Marinaro	Kaitlyn Weaver / Andrew Poje; Piper Gilles / Paul Poirier; Élisabeth Paradis / François-Xavier Ouellette
China	Jin Boyang; Yan Han	Li Zijun; Zhao Ziquan	Sui Wenjing / Han Cong; Wang Xuehan / Wang Lei; Peng Cheng / Zhang Hao	Wang Shiyue / Liu Xinyu
Chinese Taipei		Amy Lin		
Czech Republic	Michal Březina	Eliška Březinová		Cortney Mansour / Michal Češka
Denmark				Laurence Fournier Beaudry / Nikolaj Sørensen
Finland		Viveca Lindfors		Cecilia Törn / Jussiville Partanen
France	Chafik Besseghier	Maé-Bérénice Méité; Laurine Lecavelier	Vanessa James / Morgan Ciprès; Lola Esbrat / Andrei Novoselov	Gabriella Papadakis / Guillaume Cizeron
Germany	Franz Streubel	Nathalie Weinzierl	Aliona Savchenko / Bruno Massot	Kavita Lorenz / Panagiotis Polizoakis
(United Kingdom) Great Britain	Phillip Harris	Kristen Spours		Penny Coomes / Nicholas Buckland
Hungary		Ivett Tóth		
Israel	Alexei Bychenko		Adel Tankova / Evgeni Krasnopolski	Isabella Tobias / Ilia Tkachenko
Italy	Ivan Righini	Roberta Rodeghiero	Nicole Della Monica / Matteo Guarise; Valentina Marchei / Ondřej Hotárek	Anna Cappellini / Luca Lanotte; Charlène Guignard / Marco Fabbri
Japan	Yuzuru Hanyu; Shoma Uno	Satoko Miyahara; Mao Asada; Rika Hongo	Sumire Suto / Francis Boudreau Audet	Kana Muramoto / Chris Reed
Kazakhstan	Denis Ten	Elizabet Tursynbayeva		Anastasia Khromova / Daryn Zhunussov
Latvia	Deniss Vasiļjevs	Angelīna Kučvaļska		Olga Jakushina / Andrey Nevskiy
Lithuania		Aleksandra Golovkina	Goda Butkutė / Nikita Ermolaev	
Malaysia	Julian Zhi Jie Yee			
Netherlands		Niki Wories		
Norway		Anne Line Gjersem		
Philippines	Michael Christian Martinez			
Poland				Natalia Kaliszek / Maksym Spodyriev
Russia	Maxim Kovtun; Mikhail Kolyada	Evgenia Medvedeva; Elena Radionova; Anna Pogorilaya	Tatiana Volosozhar / Maxim Trankov; Ksenia Stolbova / Fedor Klimov; Evgenia Tarasova / Vladimir Morozov	Victoria Sinitsina / Nikita Katsalapov; Alexandra Stepanova / Ivan Bukin
Slovakia		Nicole Rajičová		Federica Testa / Lukáš Csölley
Slovenia		Daša Grm		
South Korea	Lee June-hyoung	Choi Da-bin; Park So-youn		Rebeka Kim / Kirill Minov
Spain	Javier Fernández; Javier Raya	Sonia Lafuente		Celia Robledo / Luis Fenero
Sweden		Joshi Helgesson		
Switzerland		Yasmine Yamada	Ioulia Chtchetinina / Noah Scherer	
Turkey				Alisa Agafonova / Alper Uçar
Ukraine	Ivan Pavlov	Anna Khnychenkova		Oleksandra Nazarova / Maxim Nikitin
United States	Max Aaron; Grant Hochstein; Adam Rippon	Gracie Gold; Mirai Nagasu; Ashley Wagner	Tarah Kayne / Daniel O'Shea; Alexa Scimeca / Chris Knierim	Madison Chock / Evan Bates; Madison Hubbell / Zachary Donohue; Maia Shibutani / Alex Shibutani
Uzbekistan	Misha Ge			

=== Changes to initial assignments ===
Announced	Country	Discipline	Initial	Replacement	Reason/Other notes
January 28, 2016	United States	Men	Nathan Chen	Grant Hochstein	Chen's hip surgery
March 11, 2016	Canada	Men	Liam Firus	Nam Nguyen	Performance
March 11, 2016	Canada	Pairs	Julianne Séguin / Charlie Bilodeau	Kirsten Moore-Towers / Michael Marinaro	Séguin's injury
March 22, 2016	Sweden	Men	Alexander Majorov	No substitute	Precursor to a stress fracture of the pelvis
March 23, 2016	United States	Ladies	Polina Edmunds	Mirai Nagasu	Edmunds' foot injury
March 26, 2016	China	Pairs	Yu Xiaoyu / Jin Yang	Peng Cheng / Zhang Hao	Yu/Jin became substitutes.

== Results ==
=== Men ===
The Men's short program was held on March 30. The free skate was held on April 1.

Rank	Name	Nation	Total points	SP		FS	
1	Javier Fernández	Spain	314.93	2	98.52	1	216.41
2	Yuzuru Hanyu	Japan	295.17	1	110.56	2	184.61
3	Jin Boyang	China	270.99	5	89.86	3	181.13
4	Mikhail Kolyada	Russia	267.97	6	89.66	5	178.31
5	Patrick Chan	Canada	266.75	3	94.84	8	171.91
6	Adam Rippon	United States	264.44	7	85.72	4	178.72
7	Shoma Uno	Japan	264.25	4	90.74	6	173.51
8	Max Aaron	United States	254.14	8	81.28	7	172.86
9	Michal Březina	Czech Republic	237.99	11	79.29	10	158.70
10	Grant Hochstein	United States	237.29	16	74.81	9	162.44
11	Denis Ten	Kazakhstan	230.13	12	78.55	12	151.58
12	Ivan Righini	Italy	228.52	9	81.17	13	147.35
13	Alexei Bychenko	Israel	226.07	19	69.86	11	156.21
14	Deniss Vasiļjevs	Latvia	224.54	10	81.07	16	143.47
15	Misha Ge	Uzbekistan	223.53	15	77.43	14	146.10
16	Jorik Hendrickx	Belgium	221.43	14	77.72	15	143.71
17	Brendan Kerry	Australia	210.56	17	71.04	17	139.52
18	Maxim Kovtun	Russia	210.14	13	78.46	21	131.68
19	Michael Christian Martinez	Philippines	204.10	23	66.98	18	137.12
20	Chafik Besseghier	France	203.20	20	69.23	20	133.97
21	Julian Zhi Jie Yee	Malaysia	202.94	22	67.60	19	135.34
22	Phillip Harris	(United Kingdom) Great Britain	190.42	21	68.53	22	121.89
23	Ivan Pavlov	Ukraine	178.89	24	65.20	23	113.69
24	Lee June-hyoung	South Korea	174.88	18	70.05	24	104.83
Did not advance to free skate
25	Javier Raya	Spain	65.06	25	65.06	—N/a	
26	Yan Han	China	62.56	26	62.56	—N/a	
27	Nam Nguyen	Canada	61.61	27	61.61	—N/a	
28	Franz Streubel	Germany	57.19	28	57.19	—N/a	
29	Denis Margalik	Argentina	52.31	29	52.31	—N/a	
30	Slavik Hayrapetyan	Armenia	49.36	30	49.36	—N/a	

=== Ladies ===
The Ladies short program was held on March 31. The free skate took place on April 2, 2016. Gracie Gold took a 2.45 point lead after the short program. Anna Pogorilaya edged out Evgenia Medvedeva for second place by 0.22. Ashley Wagner, the US Nationals bronze medalist, was just out of medal position, 0.60 behind Medvedeva. The 2015 World bronze medalist Elena Radionova was in fifth, while former World champion Mao Asada was in ninth. Defending world champion Elizaveta Tuktamysheva was not selected by her federation for the event after finishing 8th at the Russian Championships. In the free skate, Medvedeva had a record-setting score of 150.10 to win the gold medal. Wagner moved into second place to win the United States' first World Championship ladies medal since 2006. Pogorilaya finished third ahead of Gold.

Rank	Name	Nation	Total points	SP		FS	
1	Evgenia Medvedeva	Russia	223.86	3	73.76	1	150.10 WR
2	Ashley Wagner	United States	215.39	4	73.16	2	142.23
3	Anna Pogorilaya	Russia	213.69	2	73.98	4	139.71
4	Gracie Gold	United States	211.29	1	76.43	6	134.86
5	Satoko Miyahara	Japan	210.61	6	70.72	3	139.89
6	Elena Radionova	Russia	209.81	5	71.70	5	138.11
7	Mao Asada	Japan	200.30	9	65.87	7	134.43
8	Rika Hongo	Japan	199.15	7	69.89	8	129.26
9	Gabrielle Daleman	Canada	195.68	8	67.38	9	128.30
10	Mirai Nagasu	United States	186.65	10	65.74	11	120.91
11	Li Zijun	China	184.52	11	65.39	12	119.13
12	Elizabet Tursynbaeva	Kazakhstan	183.62	12	61.63	10	121.99
13	Nicole Rajičová	Slovakia	173.05	15	56.56	13	116.49
14	Choi Da-bin	South Korea	159.92	16	56.02	15	103.90
15	Angelīna Kučvaļska	Latvia	158.99	18	54.78	14	104.21
16	Roberta Rodeghiero	Italy	158.41	13	57.90	19	100.51
17	Alaine Chartrand	Canada	157.82	17	55.67	17	102.15
18	Park So-youn	South Korea	154.24	22	52.27	18	101.97
19	Anna Khnychenkova	Ukraine	154.02	19	53.86	20	100.16
20	Viveca Lindfors	Finland	152.93	23	50.18	16	102.75
21	Amy Lin	Chinese Taipei	146.55	14	57.50	22	89.05
22	Niki Wories	Netherlands	140.87	24	49.86	21	91.01
23	Zhao Ziquan	China	139.67	21	52.80	23	86.87
24	Anastasia Galustyan	Armenia	136.07	20	53.24	24	82.83
Did not advance to free skate
25	Maé-Bérénice Méité	France	49.50	25	49.50	—N/a	
26	Anne Line Gjersem	Norway	49.39	26	49.39	—N/a	
27	Kailani Craine	Australia	48.86	27	48.86	—N/a	
28	Ivett Tóth	Hungary	47.92	28	47.92	—N/a	
29	Eliška Březinová	Czech Republic	47.75	29	47.75	—N/a	
30	Joshi Helgesson	Sweden	47.67	30	47.67	—N/a	
31	Laurine Lecavelier	France	46.92	31	46.92	—N/a	
32	Kerstin Frank	Austria	46.77	32	46.77	—N/a	
33	Aleksandra Golovkina	Lithuania	44.58	33	44.58	—N/a	
34	Yasmine Yamada	Switzerland	43.65	34	43.65	—N/a	
35	Nathalie Weinzierl	Germany	43.25	35	43.25	—N/a	
36	Kristen Spours	(United Kingdom) Great Britain	42.64	36	42.64	—N/a	
37	Sonia Lafuente	Spain	39.99	37	39.99	—N/a	
38	Daša Grm	Slovenia	37.95	38	37.95	—N/a	

=== Pairs ===
The pairs short program was held on April 1 and the free skate on April 2.

Rank	Name	Nation	Total points	SP		FS	
1	Meagan Duhamel / Eric Radford	Canada	231.99	2	78.18	1	153.81
2	Sui Wenjing / Han Cong	China	224.47	1	80.85	2	143.62
3	Aliona Savchenko / Bruno Massot	Germany	216.17	4	74.22	3	141.95
4	Ksenia Stolbova / Fedor Klimov	Russia	214.48	5	73.98	4	140.50
5	Evgenia Tarasova / Vladimir Morozov	Russia	206.27	6	72.00	5	134.27
6	Tatiana Volosozhar / Maxim Trankov	Russia	205.81	3	77.13	7	128.68
7	Lubov Iliushechkina / Dylan Moscovitch	Canada	199.52	8	68.17	6	131.35
8	Kirsten Moore-Towers / Michael Marinaro	Canada	190.90	10	66.06	8	124.84
9	Alexa Scimeca / Chris Knierim	United States	190.06	7	71.37	12	118.69
10	Vanessa James / Morgan Ciprès	France	185.83	9	66.69	10	119.14
11	Nicole Della Monica / Matteo Guarise	Italy	183.81	11	65.32	13	118.49
12	Peng Cheng / Zhang Hao	China	182.46	12	60.01	9	122.45
13	Tarah Kayne / Daniel O'Shea	United States	178.23	14	59.27	11	118.96
14	Valentina Marchei / Ondřej Hotárek	Italy	170.73	13	59.76	15	110.97
15	Wang Xuehan / Wang Lei	China	168.64	15	57.32	14	111.33
16	Lola Esbrat / Andrei Novoselov	France	137.24	16	52.78	16	84.46
Did not advance to free skate
17	Goda Butkutė / Nikita Ermolaev	Lithuania	51.65	17	51.65	—N/a	
18	Ioulia Chtchetinina / Noah Scherer	Switzerland	49.32	18	49.32	—N/a	
19	Adel Tankova / Evgeni Krasnopolski	Israel	46.81	19	46.81	—N/a	
20	Tatiana Danilova / Mikalai Kamianchuk	Belarus	45.56	20	45.56	—N/a	
21	Miriam Ziegler / Severin Kiefer	Austria	45.31	21	45.31	—N/a	
22	Sumire Suto / Francis Boudreau Audet	Japan	38.50	22	38.50	—N/a	

=== Ice dancing ===
The short dance was held on March 30. 2015 World champions Gabriella Papadakis and Guillaume Cizeron of France obtained a small gold medal for the short dance for the first time in their career. They were followed by two American teams. 2011 World bronze medalists Maia Shibutani / Alex Shibutani placed second (-1.59) while 2015 silver medalists Madison Chock / Evan Bates took the third position, 2.24 behind the Shibutanis.

The free dance was held on March 31, 2016. Papadakis/Cizeron set a new world record for the free dance (118.17 points) and they won their second consecutive world title. The Shibutanis returned to the world podium four years after their first medal. Chock/Bates took the bronze medal, marking the third time that the U.S. has finished with two ice dancing teams on the World podium (earlier: 1966, 2011). Cappellini/Lanotte rose to fourth while Weaver/Poje finished fifth.

Rank	Name	Nation	Total points	SD		FD	
1	Gabriella Papadakis / Guillaume Cizeron	France	194.46	1	76.29	1	118.17
2	Maia Shibutani / Alex Shibutani	United States	188.43	2	74.70	2	113.73
3	Madison Chock / Evan Bates	United States	185.77	3	72.46	3	113.31
4	Anna Cappellini / Luca Lanotte	Italy	182.72	6	70.65	4	112.07
5	Kaitlyn Weaver / Andrew Poje	Canada	182.01	4	71.83	5	110.18
6	Madison Hubbell / Zachary Donohue	United States	176.81	7	68.44	6	108.37
7	Penny Coomes / Nicholas Buckland	(United Kingdom) Great Britain	173.17	8	68.23	7	104.94
8	Piper Gilles / Paul Poirier	Canada	173.07	5	70.70	8	102.37
9	Victoria Sinitsina / Nikita Katsalapov	Russia	168.97	9	67.68	10	101.29
10	Charlène Guignard / Marco Fabbri	Italy	167.91	10	65.96	9	101.95
11	Alexandra Stepanova / Ivan Bukin	Russia	163.30	11	63.84	11	99.46
12	Isabella Tobias / Ilia Tkachenko	Israel	154.41	13	60.97	12	93.44
13	Laurence Fournier Beaudry / Nikolaj Sørensen	Denmark	151.66	15	59.75	13	91.91
14	Federica Testa / Lukáš Csölley	Slovakia	148.83	12	61.75	15	87.08
15	Kana Muramoto / Chris Reed	Japan	147.90	16	59.00	14	88.90
16	Natalia Kaliszek / Maksim Spodirev	Poland	146.42	14	59.88	16	86.54
17	Kavita Lorenz / Panagiotis Polizoakis	Germany	138.66	18	54.80	17	83.86
18	Cecilia Törn / Jussiville Partanen	Finland	132.85	17	56.51	19	76.34
19	Oleksandra Nazarova / Maxim Nikitin	Ukraine	131.39	20	53.64	18	77.75
20	Barbora Silná / Juri Kurakin	Austria	130.88	19	54.63	20	76.25
Did not advance to free dance
21	Alisa Agafonova / Alper Uçar	Turkey	53.56	21	53.56	—N/a	
22	Wang Shiyue / Liu Xinyu	China	52.92	22	52.92	—N/a	
23	Elisabeth Paradis / François-Xavier Ouellette	Canada	51.94	23	51.94	—N/a	
24	Cortney Mansour / Michal Češka	Czech Republic	51.68	24	51.68	—N/a	
25	Rebeka Kim / Kirill Minov	South Korea	49.79	25	49.79	—N/a	
26	Celia Robledo / Luis Fenero	Spain	49.58	26	49.58	—N/a	
27	Tina Garabedian / Simon Proulx-Sénécal	Armenia	47.11	27	47.11	—N/a	
28	Viktoria Kavaliova / Yurii Bieliaiev	Belarus	40.82	28	40.82	—N/a	
29	Olga Jakushina / Andrey Nevskiy	Latvia	40.80	29	40.80	—N/a	
30	Anastasia Khromova / Daryn Zhunussov	Kazakhstan	40.69	30	40.69	—N/a	

== Medals summary ==
=== Medalists ===
Medals for overall placement:

Discipline	Gold	Silver	Bronze
Men	(Spain) Javier Fernández	(Japan) Yuzuru Hanyu	(China) Jin Boyang
Ladies	(Russia) Evgenia Medvedeva	(United States) Ashley Wagner	(Russia) Anna Pogorilaya
Pairs	(Canada) Meagan Duhamel / Eric Radford	(China) Sui Wenjing / Han Cong	(Germany) Aliona Savchenko / Bruno Massot
Ice dancing	(France) Gabriella Papadakis / Guillaume Cizeron	(United States) Maia Shibutani / Alex Shibutani	(United States) Madison Chock / Evan Bates

Small medals for placement in the short segment:

Discipline	Gold	Silver	Bronze
Men	(Japan) Yuzuru Hanyu	(Spain) Javier Fernández	(Canada) Patrick Chan
Ladies	(United States) Gracie Gold	(Russia) Anna Pogorilaya	(Russia) Evgenia Medvedeva
Pairs	(China) Sui Wenjing / Han Cong	(Canada) Meagan Duhamel / Eric Radford	(Russia) Tatiana Volosozhar / Maxim Trankov
Ice dancing	(France) Gabriella Papadakis / Guillaume Cizeron	(United States) Maia Shibutani / Alex Shibutani	(United States) Madison Chock / Evan Bates

Small medals for placement in the free segment:

Discipline	Gold	Silver	Bronze
Men	(Spain) Javier Fernández	(Japan) Yuzuru Hanyu	(China) Jin Boyang
Ladies	(Russia) Evgenia Medvedeva	(United States) Ashley Wagner	(Japan) Satoko Miyahara
Pairs	(Canada) Meagan Duhamel / Eric Radford	(China) Sui Wenjing / Han Cong	(Germany) Aliona Savchenko / Bruno Massot
Ice dancing	(France) Gabriella Papadakis / Guillaume Cizeron	(United States) Maia Shibutani / Alex Shibutani	(United States) Madison Chock / Evan Bates

=== By country ===
Table of medals for overall placement:

Rank	Nation	Gold	Silver	Bronze	Total
1	Russia (RUS)	1	0	1	2
2	Canada (CAN)	1	0	0	1
2	France (FRA)	1	0	0	1
2	Spain (ESP)	1	0	0	1
5	United States (USA)	0	2	1	3
6	China (CHN)	0	1	1	2
7	Japan (JPN)	0	1	0	1
8	Germany (GER)	0	0	1	1
Totals (8 entries)		4	4	4	12
