= Michael Marinaro =

Canadian pair skater (born 1992)

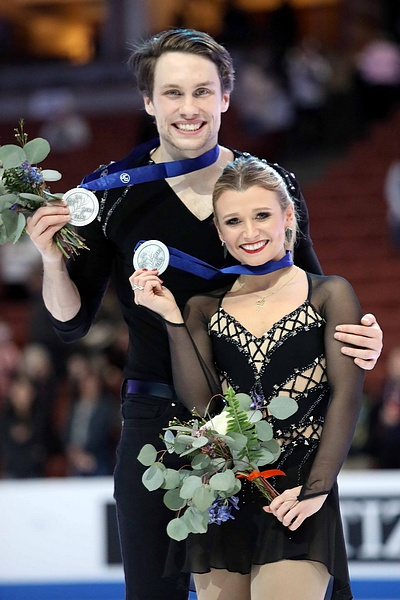
- Moore-Towers/Marinaro at the 2019 Four Continents

Personal information
- Born: January 7, 1992 (age 34) Sarnia, Ontario, Canada
- Height: 1.82 m (6 ft 0 in)

Figure skating career
- Country: Canada
- Began skating: 1994
- Retired: June 7, 2022
Medal record
Pair skating
Representing Canada (with Moore-Towers)
Four Continents Championships
Silver medal – second place	2019 Anaheim	Pairs
Bronze medal – third place	2020 Seoul	Pairs
Representing Canada (with Purdy)
World Junior Championships
Silver medal – second place	2013 Milan	Pairs

Michael Marinaro (born January 7, 1992) is a Canadian retired competitive pair skater. In an eight-year partnership with Kirsten Moore-Towers from 2014 to 2022, he achieved distinction both domestically and internationally, winning three Canadian national titles (2019–20, 2022). Competing internationally, they are two-time Four Continents medallists (silver in 2019, bronze in 2020), and have won medals on both the Grand Prix and Challenger series, including gold at the 2019 Nebelhorn Trophy and the 2017 U.S. International Classic. The two represented Canada at the 2018 and 2022 Winter Olympics.

With former partner Margaret Purdy, he was the 2013 World Junior silver medallist and 2010 Canadian national junior champion.

== Personal life ==
Michael Marinaro was born on January 7, 1992, in Sarnia, Ontario, Canada.

His older brother is Joseph Marinaro.

== Early career ==
Marinaro began skating as a two-year-old at Point Edward Skating Club in Sarnia before relocating to Strathroy at age 15. Early in his pairs career, he competed with Lindsi Disper.

=== Partnership with Purdy ===
In May 2007, Marinaro teamed up with Margaret Purdy. In the 2009–10 season, they debuted on the ISU Junior Grand Prix series and won the Canadian junior title. The pair placed eighth in The Hague at their first World Junior Championships.

In the 2011–12 season, Purdy/Marinaro won their first JGP medal — bronze in Latvia — and placed fifth at the 2012 World Junior Championships in Minsk. The following season, they won gold at their two JGP assignments in the United States and Croatia and qualified for the JGP Final, where they placed fourth. The pair took silver at the 2013 World Junior Championships in Milan, behind Haven Denney / Brandon Frazier.

In September 2013, Purdy/Marinaro and their coaches moved their training base from Strathroy to Komoka. The pair appeared at two senior Grand Prix events, the 2013 Skate America and 2013 Skate Canada International, finishing eighth at both. After placing fifth at the 2014 Canadians, they were assigned to the 2014 Four Continents and came in sixth. They announced the end of their partnership on May 27, 2014.

== Partnership with Moore-Towers ==
On June 3, 2014, Skate Canada announced that Marinaro and Kirsten Moore-Towers had formed a partnership, coached by Kris Wirtz and Kristy Wirtz at the Kitchener Waterloo Skating Club in southern Ontario. Moore-Towers said they were adjusting their technique on lifts, stating: "Mike's former partner is much taller than I am, so the technique is a bit different; he has to work in a different way."

=== 2014–15 season ===
Having received two 2014–15 Grand Prix assignments, Moore-Towers/Marinaro placed sixth at the 2014 Skate Canada International and seventh at the 2014 Trophée Éric Bompard. They were fourth at the 2015 Canadian Championships and ninth at the 2015 Four Continents.

In March 2015, the pair relocated to Montreal, Quebec, to train under Richard Gauthier and Bruno Marcotte.

=== 2015–16 season ===
Moore-Towers/Marinaro began the 2015–16 season with a bronze medal at the 2015 U.S. International Classic – their first Challenger Series event. Competing in the Grand Prix series, they won bronze at the 2015 Skate Canada International and placed seventh at the 2015 Rostelecom Cup. During the short program at the Canadian Nationals, the two clipped blades as they began the twist lift, resulting in a hard fall. They finished fourth for the second year in a row. On March 11, Moore-Towers/Marinaro were added to Canada's team for the 2016 World Championships after Julianne Séguin / Charlie Bilodeau withdrew due to injury. They finished eighth at the event in Boston.

=== 2016–17 season ===
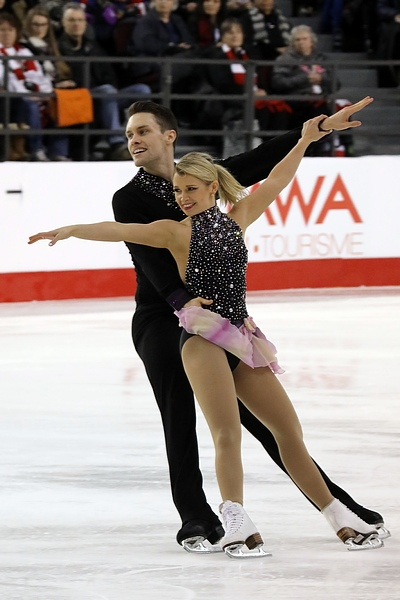
Moore-Towers and Marinaro at the 2017 Canadian Championships

Moore-Towers sustained a concussion during training in Montreal on August 3, 2016; as the pair practiced a jump combination, she fell in Marinaro's path, and he collided with her head. The pair withdrew from their Grand Prix assignments, the 2016 Rostelecom Cup and 2016 NHK Trophy. They returned to competition at the 2017 Canadian Championships, where they placed third. They placed seventh at the 2017 Four Continents Championships. They finished the season at the 2017 World Team Trophy event, where both they and the Canadian team placed fourth.

=== 2017–18 season ===
Moore-Towers and Marinaro began the season at the US International Classic, where they won the gold medal. On the Grand Prix circuit, they placed sixth at the 2017 Skate America event and won bronze at the 2017 Cup of China. They again placed third at the 2018 Canadian Championships, qualifying them for a spot on the Canadian team for the 2018 Winter Olympics in Pyeongchang, South Korea. They placed eleventh at the Winter Olympics pairs competition.

Their season ended dramatically at the 2018 World Championships, where a disastrous short program from Séguin and Bilodeau resulted in Moore-Towers and Marinaro being the only Canadian pairs team to qualify for the free skate, having placed tenth in the short program despite Moore-Towers having an ankle injury that had impeded training for the World Championships. They needed to place no lower than tenth to qualify Canada for two pairs spots at the next year's world championships, placing additional pressure. The pair skated a new personal best, resulting in a fourth-place finish in the free skate and a sixth-place overall finish that also represented a personal best combined score. Moore-Towers commented: "We had a tough couple of weeks leading into this competition with not much training to rely on. We didn't have that same confidence, so this is a testament to how hard we worked all season."

=== 2018–19 season ===
Following the retirements of Meagan Duhamel / Eric Radford and Dylan Moscovitch / Liubov Ilyushechkina, and the breakup of the team of Seguin/Bilodeau, Moore-Towers and Marinaro became the most prominent remaining Canadian pairs team. They competed in two Challenger events, winning silver at both the Autumn Classic and Finlandia Trophy.

Competing on the Grand Prix, Moore-Towers/Marinaro won the bronze medal at the 2018 Skate Canada International, only 0.15 points behind silver medallists Peng Cheng / Jin Yang of China. Moore Towers remarked, "it's hard to lose the silver medal on a fraction of a point." At their second event, the 2018 NHK Trophy, they placed third after the short program, but a rougher free skate dropped them to fourth place, 0.83 points behind bronze medallists Alexa Scimeca Knierim / Chris Knierim of the United States. Marinaro said they were "disappointed with how this turned out."

The two were heavy favourites going into the 2019 Canadian Championships and prevailed, winning both the short and free programs decisively.

Moore-Towers/Marinaro won the short program at Four Continents, earning a gold small medal, by skating a clean program while rival teams, China's Peng/Jin and Sui Wenjing / Han Cong, both fell. They placed second in the free skate and won the silver overall, only 0.06 points behind gold medallists Sui/Han. They received a negative Grade of Execution on their second lift, which accounted for the points difference. Moore-Towers described it as "a little bit bittersweet" but that they were happy at the progress they had made.

Competing at the 2019 World Championships, Moore-Towers/Marinaro placed fifth in the short program, despite Marinaro putting a hand down on their side-by-side jump. They placed eighth in the free skate and dropped to seventh place overall as a consequence of errors on both side-by-side jumps by Marinaro and Moore-Towers putting a hand down on a throw jump. She remarked: "Unfortunately, today was not our day." The two concluded the season as part of Team Canada at the 2019 World Team Trophy, where they placed fourth among the six pairs teams, and Team Canada finished fifth overall.

=== 2019–20 season ===
Following the decision by coach Bruno Marcotte to relocate to Oakville, Moore-Towers and Marinaro opted to follow Marcotte, partly because it allowed them to be closer to their hometowns in Ontario. They dedicated much of the summer training period to reworking their technique on the triple twist, hoping to achieve greater amplitude. In their first event of the season, the Nebelhorn Trophy, they won the gold medal with first-place finishes in both segments.

For their first Grand Prix, Moore-Towers/Marinaro were assigned to the 2019 Skate Canada International, placing second in the short program with a new personal best. In the free skate, Marinaro made errors on both side-by-side jumps, but the team remained in second place, winning their first Grand Prix silver. At the 2019 NHK Trophy, Moore-Towers/Marinaro placed second in the short program despite a side-by-side spin error from Marinaro. They were second in the free skate as well, taking their second silver medal of the season and qualifying to the Grand Prix Final for the first time in their partnership. Competing at the Grand Prix Final in Turin, they were sixth of the six teams in the short program after Moore-Towers fell on their throw and Marinaro stepped out of his side-by-side jump. They skated cleanly in the free skate other than Marinaro having an unusual fall after performing their throw Salchow, placing fourth in that segment and rising to fifth place overall.

Entering the 2020 Canadian Championships as the favourites to defend their title, they placed first in the short program despite Moore-Towers stepping out of her triple toe loop jump. She singled the beginning of her planned three-jump combination in the free skate as well, but the two skated cleanly otherwise and won the free skate and their second national title.

Skating a clean program, Moore-Towers/Marinaro won the short program at the Four Continents Championships for the second consecutive year, placing ahead of a similarly clean Peng/Jin and reigning World champions Sui/Han, who erred by performing only a double throw. They struggled in the free skate, with Moore-Towers singling their intended triple Salchow for the second straight competition and Marinaro falling in a transition. Fourth in the free skate behind Sui/Han, Peng/Jin and Calalang/Johnson, they won the bronze medal overall. Moore-Towers said afterwards, "we've been practicing really well, and it’s become apparent that we need to translate what we do in training into how we perform at competitions." They were assigned to compete at the World Championships in Montreal, but these were cancelled as a result of the coronavirus pandemic.

=== 2020–21 season ===
Following the initial lockdown, Moore-Towers and Marinaro were placed on a list of skaters allowed to continue training through future lockdowns. Moore-Towers/Marinaro were assigned to the 2020 Skate Canada International, but this event was also cancelled as a result of the pandemic. In September, Moore-Towers suffered a rib injury in training that kept her off the ice for several weeks.

Moore-Towers/Marinaro competed for the first time that season at the Skate Canada Challenge, the main qualifying competition for the national championships, which was held virtually across several hub locations to minimize gatherings of athletes and officials. They easily won the competition despite a few errors.

On February 25, Moore-Towers and Marinaro were announced as part of the Canadian team to the 2021 World Championships in Stockholm. They placed tenth in the short program with several minor errors. They were fifth in the free skate, rising to sixth place overall, despite a minor error by Moore-Towers touched down on a throw.

=== 2021–22 season ===
During the summer of 2021, Moore-Towers began to suffer from panic attacks in training, relating to attempting the triple twist lift. As she later said, the twist had "never been my favourite element; it's just never been my friend." At points, she contemplated whether Marinaro should seek a different partner. They opted to proceed with the season. Moore-Towers/Marinaro began the season at the 2021 CS Finlandia Trophy, competing against new domestic rivals James/Radford. They placed eighth, three ordinals and five points behind James/Radford. Moore-Towers called it "nowhere where we wanted in either program."

Competing on the Grand Prix at the 2021 Skate Canada International, Moore-Towers/Marinaro were fourth in the short program. In the free skate, they had one of their lifts invalidated due to a failed initial entry and had to abort a second lift; as a result, they were sixth in that segment and dropped to sixth overall. Moore-Towers said afterward, "there is no rhyme nor reason for the lifts. We had a tricky practice this morning, so we had more focus on the jumps and throws." They were fifth at the 2021 Rostelecom Cup, continuing to struggle on their elements, which Moore-Towers called "more of a mental thing" as it was not consistent with their training. Following the Grand Prix they competed at the 2021 CS Golden Spin of Zagreb, where they finished in eighth place.

After a disappointing fall season, Moore-Towers/Marinaro sought to defend their national title at the 2022 Canadian Championships, held without an audience in Ottawa due to restrictions prompted by the Omicron variant. They won the short program by 6.14 points over training partners Walsh/Michaud, while James/Radford placed fourth and withdrew before the free skate. Moore-Towers/Marinaro easily won the free skate, with only their twist receiving a negative Grade of Execution. Moore-Towers said she was "ecstatic," and "it wasn't perfect, but it is obviously leaps and bounds ahead of what we've done this season." On January 9 they were named to the Canadian Olympic team.

Moore-Towers/Marinaro began the Games as the Canadian entries in the pairs' short program of the Olympic team event. They received a negative grade of execution on their triple twist, and Moore-Towers stepped out of her triple toe loop but secured a season's best score of 67.34 to place fifth, earning Team Canada six points. They did not skate in the free segment, which James/Radford handled, and Team Canada ultimately finished fourth overall. In the pairs event, Moore-Towers/Marinaro had a disastrous short program when both fell attempting their throw jump, and they finished thirteenth in the segment. They rose to tenth place after the free skate.

The team was supposed to conclude the season, and their competitive careers, at the 2022 World Championships in Montpellier. However, Moore-Towers' season-long struggle with panic attacks came to a head, and she opted to withdraw from the event, citing American gymnast Simone Biles as inspiration. On the subject of attending the World Championships with Marinaro, Moore-Towers said, "I love him so much, cherish his opinion and value his voice and like to think I would give him anything in the world that he asked for. I think it says a lot that I could not give him this."

On June 7, the pair announced their retirement from competitive skating. Marinaro called his career a "roller-coaster ride of ups and downs. I would like to thank everyone who has been a part of my training and support staff throughout my career. I will do my best to pass on all the valuable skills and lessons each, and every one of you have taught me."

== Programs ==
=== With Moore-Towers ===
Season	Short program	Free skating	Exhibition
2021–22	Hold on Tight by Forest Blakk choreo. by Mark Pillay	Carry You by Ruelle & Fleurie choreo. by Julie Marcotte	
2020–21	Gimme All Your Love by Alabama Shakes choreo. by Julie Marcotte	The Blower's Daughter by Damien Rice choreo. by Julie Marcotte	I Lived by OneRepublic
2019–20	Love on the Brain by Rihanna performed by Cold War Kids & Bishop Briggs choreo. by Julie Marcotte	Carry You by Ruelle & Fleurie choreo. by Julie Marcotte	I Lived by OneRepublic
2018–19	The First Time Ever I Saw Your Face by Ewan MacColl performed by Leona Lewis choreo. by Julie Marcotte	Shine On You Crazy Diamond; The Happiest Days of Our Lives; Another Brick in the Wall by Pink Floyd choreo. by Julie Marcotte	Eet by Regina Spektor
2017–18	Sweet Dreams (Are Made of This) by Eurythmics performed by Térez Montcalm choreo. by Julie Marcotte	Un Ange Passe by Alain Lefèvre choreo. by Julie Marcotte	Glad You Came by The Wanted
2016–17	Hardrock Hotel by Mae Boren Axton and Tommy Darden	Un Ange Passe by Alain Lefèvre choreo. by Julie Marcotte	
2015–16	If I Can't Have You by Etta James choreo. by Julie Marcote	Romeo + Juliet; Introduction to Romeo; O Verona by Craig Armstrong; Kissing You by Des'ree; Juliet's Requiem; Escape From Mantua by Craig Armstrong choreo. by Julie Marcotte	It's a Man's Man's Man's World performed by Joshua Ledet
2014–15	Cell Block Tango (from Chicago) by John Kander choreo. by Mark Pillay	Chess (musical) by Benny Andersson, Björn Ulvaeus choreo. by Mark Pillay	It's a Man's Man's Man's World performed by Joshua Ledet

=== With Purdy ===
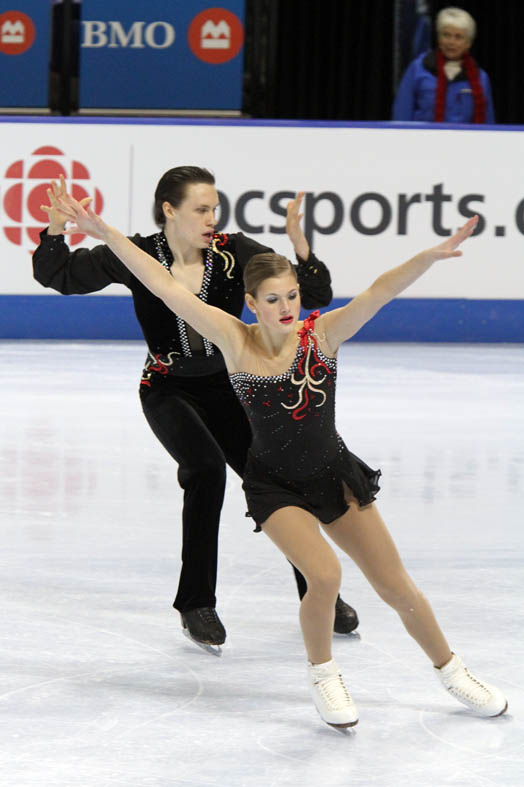
Purdy and Marinaro at the 2011 Canadian Championships

Season	Short program	Free skating	Exhibition
2013–14	Unchained Melody by Alex North	Casablanca by Max Steiner	
2012–13	O mio babbino caro (from Gianni Schicchi) by Giacomo Puccini	The Artist by Ludovic Bource	Beauty and a Beat by Justin Bieber featuring Nicki Minaj
2011–12	Fuente y Caudal by Paco de Lucía; Harlem Nocturne	Who Wants to Live Forever; The Show Must Go On by Queen	Someone Like You by Adele
2010–11	Fuente y Caudal by Paco de Lucía	New Moon by Alexandre Desplat	
2009–10	Santa Maria by Gotan Project	Here, There and Everywhere; Something by The Beatles	

== Competitive highlights ==
GP: Grand Prix; CS: Challenger Series; JGP: Junior Grand Prix

=== With Moore-Towers ===
International
Event	14–15	15–16	16–17	17–18	18–19	19–20	20–21	21–22
Olympics				11th				10th
Worlds		8th		6th	7th	C	6th	WD
Four Continents	9th		7th		2nd	3rd		
GP Final						5th		
GP Cup of China				3rd				
GP France	7th							
GP NHK Trophy			WD		4th	2nd		
GP Rostelecom		7th	WD					5th
GP Skate America				6th				
GP Skate Canada	6th	3rd			3rd	2nd	C	6th
CS Autumn Classic					2nd			
CS Finlandia					2nd			8th
CS Golden Spin								8th
CS Nebelhorn						1st		
CS U.S. Classic		3rd	WD	1st				
National
Canadian Champ.	4th	4th	3rd	3rd	1st	1st	C	1st
SC Challenge	2nd		1st				1st	
Team events
Olympics								4th T
World Team Trophy			4th T 4th P		5th T 4th P			

=== With Purdy ===
International
Event	09–10	10–11	11–12	12–13	13–14
Four Continents					6th
GP Skate America					8th
GP Skate Canada					8th
International: Junior
Junior Worlds	8th		5th	2nd	
JGP Final				4th	
JGP Austria			10th		
JGP Croatia				1st	
JGP Czech Rep.		9th			
JGP Germany	10th				
JGP Latvia			3rd		
JGP Poland	7th				
JGP UK		10th			
JGP USA				1st	
National
Canadian Champ.	1st J	9th	6th	5th	5th

== Detailed results ==
Small medals for short and free programs awarded only at ISU Championships. At team events, medals awarded for team results only. Current ISU personal bests highlighted in bold. Historical ISU personal bests highlighted in italics.

=== With Moore-Towers ===
**2021–22 season**
Date	Event	SP	FS	Total
February 18–19, 2022	2022 Winter Olympics	13; 62.51	10; 118.86	10; 181.37
February 4–7, 2022	2022 Winter Olympics – Team event	5; 67.34	—	4T
January 6–12, 2022	2022 Canadian Championships	1; 73.02	1; 139.52	1; 212.54
December 9–11, 2021	2021 CS Golden Spin of Zagreb	6; 61.51	7; 115.46	8; 176.97
November 26–28, 2021	2021 Rostelecom Cup	7; 58.95	5; 118.77	5; 177.72
October 29–31, 2021	2021 Skate Canada International	4; 66.43	6; 113.82	6; 180.25
October 7–10, 2021	2021 CS Finlandia Trophy	8; 61.60	8; 122.77	8; 184.37
**2020–21 season**
Date	Event	SP	FS	Total
March 22–28, 2021	2021 World Championships	10; 63.45	5; 131.84	6; 195.29
January 8–9, 2021	2021 Skate Canada Challenge	1; 71.04	1; 135.18	1; 206.22
**2019–20 season**
Date	Event	SP	FS	Total
February 4–9, 2020	2020 Four Continents Championships	1; **76.36**	4; 125.44	3; 201.80
January 13–19, 2020	2020 Canadian Championships	1; 73.73	1; 141.94	1; 215.67
December 4–8, 2019	2019–20 Grand Prix Final	6; 67.08	4; 130.91	5; 197.99
November 22–24, 2019	2019 NHK Trophy	2; 71.21	2; 137.28	2; 208.49
October 25–27, 2019	2019 Skate Canada International	2; 75.50	2; 132.99	2; 208.49
September 25–28, 2019	2019 CS Nebelhorn Trophy	1; 71.76	1; **138.59**	1; 210.35
**2018–19 season**
Date	Event	SP	FS	Total
April 11–14, 2019	2019 World Team Trophy	4; 68.38	3; 131.84	5T/4P; 200.22
March 18–24, 2019	2019 World Championships	5; 73.08	8; 126.94	7; 200.02
February 7–10, 2019	2019 Four Continents Championships	1; 74.66	2; 136.39	2; **211.05**
January 13–20, 2019	2019 Canadian Championships	1; 71.47	1; 131.28	1; 202.75
November 9–11, 2018	2018 NHK Trophy	3; 67.70	4; 121.96	4; 189.66
October 26–28, 2018	2018 Skate Canada International	3; 71.26	3; 129.67	3; 200.93
October 4–7, 2018	2018 CS Finlandia Trophy	3; 66.52	1; 127.41	2; 193.93
September 20–22, 2018	2018 CS Autumn Classic International	2; 64.73	2; 111.59	2; 176.32
**2017–18 season**
Date	Event	SP	FS	Total
March 19–25, 2018	2018 World Championships	10; 70.49	4; 133.84	6; 204.33
February 14–15, 2018	2018 Winter Olympics	13; 65.68	9; 132.43	11; 198.11
January 8–14, 2018	2018 Canadian Championships	3; 68.28	3; 141.57	3; 209.85
November 24–26, 2017	2017 Skate America	7; 59.97	4; 127.84	6; 187.81
November 3–5, 2017	2017 Cup of China	4; 62.52	3; 132.00	3; 194.52
September 13–17, 2017	2017 CS U.S. International Classic	1; 65.76	2; 123.00	1; 188.76
**2016–17 season**
Date	Event	SP	FS	Total
April 20–23, 2017	2017 World Team Trophy	3; 69.56	4; 130.09	4T/4P; 199.65
February 15–19, 2017	2017 Four Continents Championships	5; 70.89	7; 121.46	7; 192.35
January 16–22, 2017	2017 Canadian Championships	3; 70.69	3; 128.05	3; 198.74
**2015–16 season**
Date	Event	SP	FS	Total
Mar. 28 – Apr. 3, 2016	2016 World Championships	10; 66.06	8; 124.84	8; 190.90
January 18–24, 2016	2016 Canadian Championships	4; 59.67	4; 123.91	4; 183.58
November 20–22, 2015	2015 Rostelecom Cup	7; 51.97	7; 106.78	7; 158.75
Oct. 30 – Nov. 1, 2015	2015 Skate Canada International	3; 63.17	3; 111.68	3; 174.85
September 16–20, 2015	2015 CS U.S. International Classic	2; 57.22	3; 102.86	3; 160.08
**2014–15 season**
Date	Event	SP	FS	Total
February 9–15, 2015	2015 Four Continents Championships	7; 59.30	9; 101.40	9; 160.70
January 19–25, 2015	2015 Canadian Championships	4; 61.08	4; 119.40	4; 180.48
November 21–23, 2014	2014 Trophée Éric Bompard	7; 51.07	6; 108.06	7; 159.13
Oct. 31 – Nov. 2, 2014	2014 Skate Canada International	6; 53.79	6; 105.03	6; 158.82
