= 2015 Skate Canada International =

- Type: Grand Prix
- Date: October 30 – November 1
- Season: 2015–16
- Location: Lethbridge, Alberta
- Host: Skate Canada
- Venue: ENMAX Centre

Champions
- Men's singles: (Canada) Patrick Chan
- Ladies' singles: (United States) Ashley Wagner
- Pairs: (Canada) Meagan Duhamel / Eric Radford
- Ice dance: (Canada) Kaitlyn Weaver / Andrew Poje
- Previous: 2014 Skate Canada International
- Next: 2016 Skate Canada International
- Previous Grand Prix: 2015 Skate America
- Next Grand Prix: 2015 Cup of China

The 2015 Skate Canada International was the second event of six in the 2015–16 ISU Grand Prix of Figure Skating, a senior-level international invitational competition series. It was held at the ENMAX Centre in Lethbridge, Alberta on October 30 – November 1. Medals were awarded in the disciplines of men's singles, ladies' singles, pair skating, and ice dancing. Skaters earned points toward qualifying for the 2015–16 Grand Prix Final.

== Entries ==
Country	Men	Ladies	Pairs	Ice dancing
Austria			Miriam Ziegler / Severin Kiefer	
Canada	Patrick Chan; Keegan Messing; Nam Nguyen	Gabrielle Daleman; Véronik Mallet; Kaetlyn Osmond	Meagan Duhamel / Eric Radford; Vanessa Grenier / Maxime Deschamps; Kirsten Moore-Towers / Michael Marinaro	Élisabeth Paradis / François-Xavier Ouellette; Alexandra Paul / Mitchell Islam; Kaitlyn Weaver / Andrew Poje
Czech Republic	Michal Březina			
Denmark				Laurence Fournier Beaudry / Nikolaj Sørensen
Italy			Valentina Marchei / Ondřej Hotárek	Charlène Guignard / Marco Fabbri
Japan	Yuzuru Hanyu; Sei Kawahara; Daisuke Murakami	Kanako Murakami; Yuka Nagai		
Kazakhstan		Elizabet Tursynbaeva		
South Korea	Kim Jin-seo; Lee June-hyoung			
Russia	Alexander Petrov	Alena Leonova; Elizaveta Tuktamysheva	Vera Bazarova / Andrei Deputat; Evgenia Tarasova / Vladimir Morozov	Ekaterina Bobrova / Dmitri Soloviev; Ksenia Monko / Kirill Khaliavin
Sweden		Joshi Helgesson; Isabelle Olsson		
United States	Timothy Dolensky; Adam Rippon	Polina Edmunds; Ashley Wagner	Marissa Castelli / Mervin Tran	Maia Shibutani / Alex Shibutani

=== Changes to preliminary assignments ===
- On July 24, 2015, Ronald Lam announced his retirement. He was officially removed from the roster on August 21. On September 4, he was officially replaced with Kim Jin-seo.
- On August 21, Veronik Mallet was announced as a host pick.
- On September 2, Vanessa Grenier / Maxime Deschamps and Elisabeth Paradis / Francois Xavier Ouelette were announced as a host pick.
- On September 24, Joshua Farris was removed from the roster. U.S. Figure Skating announced he had to withdraw due to a concussion. On September 25, it was announced that he was replaced by Timothy Dolensky. Dolensky was officially added to the roster on September 28.
- On October 16, Elene Gedevanishvili was removed from the roster. No reason has been given. On October 19, her replacement was announced as Isabelle Olsson.
- On October 22, Peter Liebers was replaced by Sei Kawahara.

== Results ==
=== Men ===
Rank	Name	Nation	Total points	SP		FS	
1	Patrick Chan	Canada	271.14	2	80.81	1	190.33
2	Yuzuru Hanyu	Japan	259.54	6	73.25	2	186.29
3	Daisuke Murakami	Japan	252.25	1	80.88	3	171.37
4	Adam Rippon	United States	239.69	3	80.36	5	159.33
5	Nam Nguyen	Canada	238.82	4	76.10	4	162.72
6	Alexander Petrov	Russia	221.02	7	71.44	7	149.58
7	Timothy Dolensky	United States	219.06	11	62.46	6	156.60
8	Michal Březina	Czech Republic	218.58	5	75.46	8	143.12
9	Kim Jin-seo	South Korea	195.84	8	68.64	10	127.20
10	Sei Kawahara	Japan	195.21	9	67.36	9	127.85
11	Keegan Messing	Canada	182.25	10	67.13	11	115.12
12	Lee June-hyoung	South Korea	152.05	12	47.19	12	104.86

=== Ladies ===
Rank	Name	Nation	Total points	SP		FS	
1	Ashley Wagner	United States	202.52	1	70.73	2	131.79
2	Elizaveta Tuktamysheva	Russia	188.99	7	55.37	1	133.62
3	Yuka Nagai	Japan	172.92	2	63.35	7	109.57
4	Kanako Murakami	Japan	171.59	3	59.79	6	111.80
5	Gabrielle Daleman	Canada	170.33	8	54.13	3	116.20
6	Polina Edmunds	United States	168.69	5	56.85	5	111.84
7	Elizabet Tursynbaeva	Kazakhstan	165.16	12	49.84	4	115.32
8	Alena Leonova	Russia	160.37	10	52.08	8	108.29
9	Joshi Helgesson	Sweden	155.70	6	56.26	10	99.44
10	Véronik Mallet	Canada	151.85	9	52.17	9	99.68
11	Kaetlyn Osmond	Canada	146.06	4	59.21	12	86.85
12	Isabelle Olsson	Sweden	141.58	11	50.23	11	91.35

=== Pairs ===
Rank	Name	Nation	Total points	SP		FS	
1	Meagan Duhamel / Eric Radford	Canada	216.16	1	72.46	1	143.70
2	Evgenia Tarasova / Vladimir Morozov	Russia	191.19	2	64.00	2	127.19
3	Kirsten Moore-Towers / Michael Marinaro	Canada	174.85	3	63.17	3	111.68
4	Marissa Castelli / Mervin Tran	United States	173.40	4	61.85	4	111.55
5	Vera Bazarova / Andrei Deputat	Russia	156.15	5	57.02	6	99.13
6	Miriam Ziegler / Severin Kiefer	Austria	153.29	7	49.95	5	103.34
7	Vanessa Grenier / Maxime Deschamps	Canada	144.15	8	45.45	7	98.70
WD	Valentina Marchei / Ondřej Hotárek	Italy	withdrew	6	54.00	withdrew from competition	

=== Ice dancing ===
Rank	Name	Nation	Total points	SD		FD	
1	Kaitlyn Weaver / Andrew Poje	Canada	173.79	1	68.00	1	105.79
2	Maia Shibutani / Alex Shibutani	United States	168.36	2	66.00	2	102.36
3	Ekaterina Bobrova / Dmitri Soloviev	Russia	161.11	3	64.38	3	96.73
4	Charlène Guignard / Marco Fabbri	Italy	154.74	4	61.29	4	93.45
5	Ksenia Monko / Kirill Khaliavin	Russia	147.57	6	57.44	5	90.13
6	Alexandra Paul / Mitchell Islam	Canada	143.92	5	57.55	6	86.37
7	Laurence Fournier Beaudry / Nikolaj Sørensen	Denmark	134.94	7	53.65	8	81.29
8	Élisabeth Paradis / François-Xavier Ouellette	Canada	131.05	8	47.77	7	83.28
