= François-Xavier Ouellette =

Canadian ice dancer

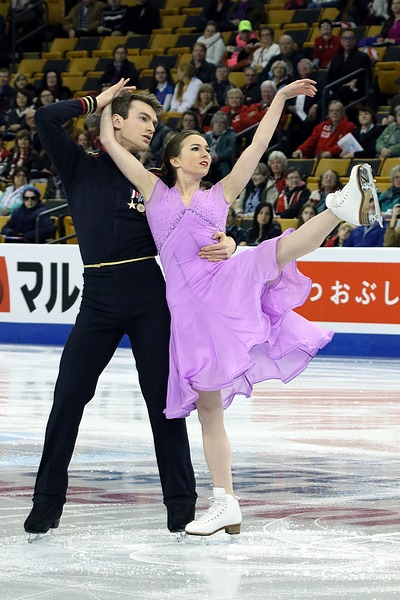
- Ouellette & Paradis at the 2016 World Championships

Personal information
- Born: February 13, 1992 (age 34) Laval, Quebec, Canada
- Height: 1.78 m (5 ft 10 in)

Figure skating career
- Country: Canada
- Coach: Patrice Lauzon, Marie-France Dubreuil, Pascal Denis, Romain Haguenauer
- Skating club: CPA Lames d'Argent Quebec; Gadbois Centre
- Began skating: 1998
- Retired: 2016

François-Xavier Ouellette (born February 13, 1992) is a Canadian former competitive ice dancer. With Élisabeth Paradis, he won bronze medals at the 2015 CS U.S. International Classic and at the 2016 Canadian Nationals.

== Career ==
Early in his career, Ouellette skated with Jessica Aquino. He competed with Marie-Philippe Vincent from the 2007–08 season through 2009–10. They placed 13th on the junior level at the 2010 Canadian Nationals.

=== Partnership with Paradis ===
Ouellette began competing with Élisabeth Paradis in the 2010–11 season. Appearing on the junior level, they placed 5th at the 2011 Canadian Nationals and 6th in 2012. They moved up to the senior level in the 2012–13 season.

Making their international debut, Paradis/Ouellette placed fifth at the 2013 International Cup of Nice. They finished 8th at the 2014 Canadian Nationals.

Paradis/Ouellette began the 2014–15 season at an ISU Challenger Series (CS) event, the 2014 Nebelhorn Trophy, finishing fifth, and then appeared on the Grand Prix (GP) series, having received two assignments. They finished fourth overall at the 2014 Skate America (8th in the short dance, 4th in the free), and 7th at the 2014 Skate Canada International. They placed fifth at the 2015 Canadian Nationals.

In 2015–16, Paradis/Ouellette won bronze at their CS assignment, the 2015 U.S. International Classic. They were eighth at their sole GP event, the 2015 Skate Canada International. In January 2016, they placed fourth in the short dance and third in the free at the Canadian Nationals in Halifax, Nova Scotia, winning the bronze medal by a margin of 0.22 over Alexandra Paul / Mitchell Islam.

Paradis/Ouellette announced the end of their partnership on September 7, 2016.

== Programs ==
(with Paradis)

| Season | Short dance | Free dance |
|---|---|---|
| 2015–16 | Lost by Anouk, Bart van Veen; Kill by Martin Enk Gjerstad choreo. by Marie-France Dubreuil, Patrice Lauzon | Bridge over Troubled Water by Simon & Garfunkel; Composition by Karl Hugo van der Kerkhove choreo. by Marie-France Dubreuil, Patrice Lauzon |
| 2014–15 | Paso doble: Marcarenas; Flamenco: Eclipse de Luna | Un peu plus haut by Jean-Pierre Ferland; Composition by Karl-Hugo van de Kerckhove |
| 2013–14 | He Loves and She Loves; Dancin' Fool | Speak Softly, Love (from The Godfather) sung by Katherine Jenkins |
| 2012–13 | Come Away with Me by Norah Jones; Black Horse and the Cherry Tree by KT Tunstall | High Hopes; Run Like Hell by Pink Floyd |
| 2011–12 | Black Magic Woman; Oye Cómo Va | Heartbreak Hotel; Blue Suede Shoes by Elvis Presley |

== Competitive highlights ==
GP: Grand Prix; CS: Challenger Series

=== With Paradis ===
International
| Event | 10–11 | 11–12 | 12–13 | 13–14 | 14–15 | 15–16 |
|---|---|---|---|---|---|---|
| Worlds | | | | | | 23rd |
| Four Continents | | | | | | 6th |
| GP Skate America | | | | | 4th | |
| GP Skate Canada | | | | | 7th | 8th |
| CS Nebelhorn | | | | | 5th | |
| CS U.S. Classic | | | | | | 3rd |
| Cup of Nice | | | | 5th | | |
National
| Canadian Champ. | 5th J | 6th J | 7th | 8th | 5th | 3rd |
| SC Challenge | 6th J | 1st J | 1st | 4th | | |
| Québec Sectionals | | | 1st | | | |
J: Junior level

=== With Vincent ===
National
| Event | 2007–08 | 2008–09 | 2009–10 |
|---|---|---|---|
| Canadian Championships | 8th N | 15th J | 13th J |
| Skate Canada Challenge | | | 7th J |
| Skate Canada Eastern Challenge | 6th N | 9th J | |
| Québec Sectionals | 5th N | 6th J | 3rd J |
Levels – N: Novice; J: Junior
