= Elizabet Tursynbaeva =

Kazakh retired figure skater

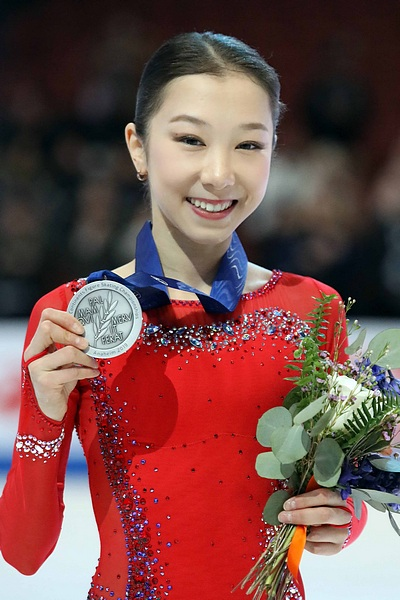
- Tursynbaeva in 2019

Personal information
- Native name: Элизабет Байтаққызы Тұрсынбаева
- Other names: Tursynbayeva; Turzynbaeva
- Born: 14 February 2000 (age 26) Moscow, Russia
- Height: 1.58 m (5 ft 2 in)

Figure skating career
- Country: Kazakhstan
- Coach: Eteri Tutberidze
- Skating club: Sambo 70
- Began skating: 2005
- Retired: 20 September 2021
Medal record
Representing Kazakhstan
Figure skating: Ladies's singles
World Championships
Silver medal – second place	2019 Saitama	Ladies' singles
Four Continents Championships
Silver medal – second place	2019 Anaheim	Ladies' singles
Kazakh Championships
Gold medal – first place	2015 Kyzylorda	Ladies’ Singles
Gold medal – first place	2016 Kyzylorda	Ladies’ Singles
Gold medal – first place	2017 Almaty	Ladies’ Singles
Winter Universiade
Silver medal – second place	2019 Krasnoyarsk	Ladies' singles
Asian Winter Games
Bronze medal – third place	2017 Sapporo	Ladies' singles
Winter Youth Olympics
Bronze medal – third place	2016 Lillehammer	Ladies's singles

Elizabet Baitaqqyzy Tūrsynbaeva (Note: Often transliterated as Elizabet Baitakovna Tursynbayeva through a Russified Romanization of Элизабет Байтаковна Турсынбаева.) (Kazakh: Элизабет Байтаққызы Тұрсынбаева; born 14 February 2000) is a Kazakh retired figure skater. She is the 2019 World silver medalist, the 2019 Four Continents silver medalist, the 2017 CS Ice Star champion, the 2018 CS Finlandia Trophy silver medalist, the 2015 CS Golden Spin of Zagreb silver medalist, the 2019 Winter Universiade silver medalist, and a three-time Kazakhstani national champion (2015–2017). She placed 12th at the 2018 Winter Olympics.

Having successfully landed a quadruple Salchow at the 2019 World Figure Skating Championships, Tursynbaeva is the first female skater to land a quadruple jump in senior international competition.

Competing in the junior ranks, Tursynbaeva won bronze at the 2016 Winter Youth Olympics and silver at two ISU Junior Grand Prix events.

In September 2021, she announced her retirement due to a chronic back injury.

== Personal life ==
Tursynbaeva was born on 14 February 2000 in Moscow, Russia. She is the daughter of Padishakhan Sultanalieva and Baitak Tursynbaev. Her family is originally from Kazakhstan. Her brother, Timur Tursynbaev, who is two years older than her, is a two-time Kazakhstan national figure skating champion. Tursynbaeva is a professional violinist and can also play the piano. She attended a special music school in Moscow. She and her mother settled in Toronto, Ontario, Canada, in May 2015, where she was home-schooled. In 2018, they relocated back to Moscow, Russia.

== Career ==
=== Early career ===
Tursynbaeva started skating at the age of five after following her brother, Timur, into figure skating. As a child, she was coached by Natalia Dubinskaya and Alexander Shubin. She was also briefly coached by Elena Buianova and Svetlana Sokolovskaya from 2011 to 2012, before switching to Eteri Tutberidze.

Representing Kazakhstan, Tursynbaeva made her international debut in April 2011, placing fourth in the novice ladies' category at the Rooster Cup. She won the novice bronze medal at the 2011 NRW Trophy. After finishing thirteenth at the 2013 Russian Junior Championships, she decided to continue representing Kazakhstan. She made no international appearances for Russia.

Her coaching relationship with Tutberidze ended in 2013 because Russian coaches no longer had the right to work with non-Russian skaters during the 2014 Olympic season. Having difficulty finding a coach in Russia, Tursynbaeva and her mother wrote a letter to Brian Orser, whom she had always wanted as a coach, and sent him videos of her, asking if he could coach her. Orser, impressed by her talent, responded that he would love to work with her.

=== 2013–2014 season: Junior international debut ===
Before the 2013–2014 season, Tursynbaeva began training under Brian Orser and Tracy Wilson in Toronto, Canada. In September 2013, she won the silver medal in her ISU Junior Grand Prix (JGP) debut, in Minsk, Belarus. She placed fifth at her second JGP event, in Tallinn, Estonia, and eleventh at the 2014 World Junior Championships in Sofia, Bulgaria. She ended her season with gold at the 2014 Triglav Trophy in Slovenia.

=== 2014–2015 season ===
During the 2014 JGP series, Tursynbaeva won bronze in Aichi, Japan and silver in Dresden, Germany, finishing as the second alternate for the JGP Final. She then won the junior ladies' titles at the International Cup of Nice, Merano Cup, and NRW Trophy. At the 2015 World Junior Championships in Tallinn, she placed seventh in the short program, fourth in the free skate, and fourth overall.

For most of this season, Tursynbaeva experienced visa problems, which meant that she spent only part of the season training in Toronto under Orser and instead trained mainly at a shopping mall ice rink in Moscow with her mother.

=== 2015–2016 season: Senior international debut ===
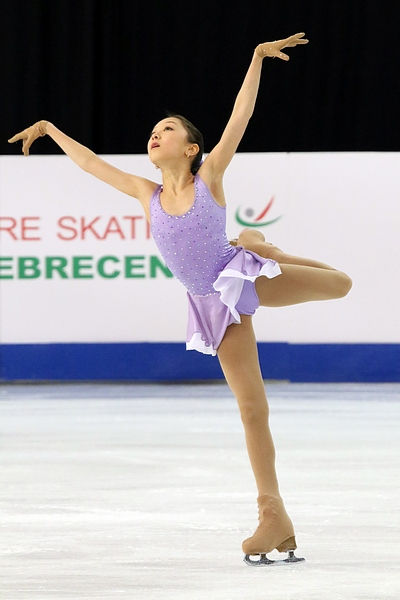
Tursynbaeva at the 2016 World Junior Championships

Tursynbaeva became eligible to compete internationally at the senior level for the first time in the 2015-16 season. She was invited to two Grand Prix events. Due to her ongoing visa problem, her first short program, Send In the Clowns, was created in Russia. Her exhibition program, I Got Rhythm, became her short program later during the season.

Tursynbaeva began her season by winning silver at the 2015 U.S. Classic, her first ISU Challenger Series (CS) event, and gold at the 2015 Skate Canada Autumn Classic. Making her Grand Prix debut, she placed fourth at the 2015 Skate America and seventh at the 2015 Skate Canada International. She then won silver medals at the 2015 CS Tallinn Trophy and 2015 CS Golden Spin of Zagreb.

In February 2016, Tursynbaeva won the individual bronze medal, behind Russians Polina Tsurskaya and Maria Sotskova, at the Winter Youth Olympics in Hamar, Norway. In March, she rose from fourteenth after the short to finish fifth overall (fourth in the free) at the 2016 World Junior Championships in Debrecen, Hungary. In April, she finished twelfth at the 2016 World Championships in Boston after placing twelfth in the short and tenth in the free. Later that month, she competed at her first team event, the 2016 Team Challenge Cup in Spokane, Washington.

=== 2016–2017 season ===
Tursynbaeva won the bronze medal at the 2016 CS Autumn Classic International. She appeared as a torch-bearer for the 2017 Winter Universiade but was too young to compete. At the 2017 Four Continents Championships in Gangneung, South Korea, she received a small bronze medal for her short program and finished eighth overall. Later that month, she placed third at the 2017 Asian Winter Games. Tursynbaeva would go on to finish ninth at the 2017 World Championships, scoring personal bests in the free skate and combined total scores. Her ninth-place finish qualified two spots for the ladies' singles event for the 2018 Winter Olympics in Pyeongchang and 2018 World Championships in Milan. During the season, videos surfaced of Tursynbaeva completing fully rotated quad Salchow jumps, along with quadruple Salchows in combination with double and triple toe-loops.

=== 2017–2018 season ===
Tursynbaeva won the bronze medal at the 2017 CS Autumn Classic International and then placed eighth at the 2017 Rostelecom Cup. She went on to win the 2017 CS Minsk-Arena Ice Star. She scored a personal best, placing fifth, at the 2017 Internationaux de France. At her next competition, the 2018 Four Continents Championships, she received her lowest scores of the season and finished twelfth. She went on to place twelfth at the 2018 Winter Olympics, and eleventh at the 2018 World Figure Skating Championships.

=== 2018–2019 season: World and Four Continents silver ===
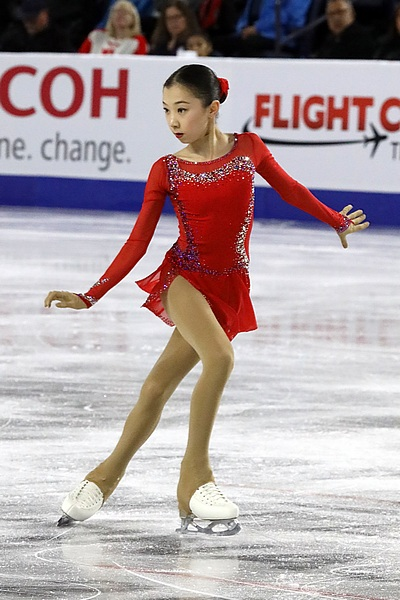
Tursynbaeva at 2018 Skate Canada

In June, Tursynbaeva announced that she had changed coaches from Brian Orser and Tracy Wilson back to her previous coach, Eteri Tutberidze. Beginning on the Challenger series, Tursynbaeva won silver medals at both the Finlandia Trophy and the Ondrej Nepela Trophy. Assigned to two Grand Prix events, she finished fifth at the 2018 Skate Canada International and sixth at the 2018 Rostelecom Cup.

At the 2019 Four Continents Championships, she placed sixth in the short program after turning out of her double Axel. She placed third in the free skate, which included an attempted quad Salchow that she fully rotated but fell on, and won the silver medal overall. This was only the second Four Continents medal for a Kazakh skater (after Denis Ten) and the first for a lady. Speaking afterward, Tursynbaeva admitted that she did not expect to make the podium. Regarding the quad, she said, "I still have work to do on it, but it wasn’t bad for a first time in competition."

Tursynbaeva next competed in the 2019 Winter Universiade. She placed fourth after the short program and first in the free skate. Her free skate included an attempted quad Salchow that she fell on. She was able to deliver the rest of her program without any mistakes, winning the silver medal. In doing so, she became the second Kazakh skater (again after Denis Ten) to medal at a Winter Universiade and the first to medal in ladies' singles.

At the 2019 World Championships, Tursynbaeva placed third in the short program after executing a triple Salchow-triple toe loop combination in the second half of the program, which earned a bonus 10% for the element's score. She then placed fourth in the free skate, where she successfully landed the quad Salchow, becoming the first woman to ever land a quadruple jump at the World Championships and the first senior female skater to ever land a quadruple jump in competition. She finished in second place overall, becoming the second Kazakh skater to medal at the World Championships and the first to do so in ladies' singles. In an interview, when asked about her performance and the quad, she said "I can't believe I landed it, it was good in practice this morning. I couldn't do it at the last two competitions so I was really glad to be able to do it here."

=== 2019–2020 season: Struggles and retirement from competition ===
Tursynbaeva suffered from recurring injury issues that compelled her to withdraw from the 2019 CS Lombardia Trophy. Although she was able to compete at the 2019 Shanghai Trophy, where she won the silver medal, she again withdrew from competition, missing her first Grand Prix assignment, 2019 Skate America. She then subsequently withdrew from the 2019 Cup of China as well, stating that she hoped to be well enough to participate in ice shows later in the year.

Following the season, Tursynvaeva announced her retirement from competition on September 20, 2021, through an Instagram post, citing difficulty in overcoming a persistent back injury.

=== Post-retirement ===
Tursynbayeva, along with another Kazakh ice skater Kseniya Pankratova, went viral in 2021 for their Instagram video of their ice skating performances on a frozen lake in Kazakhstan.

== Programs ==
Season	Short program	Free skating	Exhibition
2019–2020	Danse macabre by Camille Saint-Saëns choreo. by Daniil Gleikhengauz	Piano Concerto No. 2 by Sergei Rachmaninoff choreo. by Daniil Gleikhengauz	Adagio (Denis Ten Tribute) by Lara Fabian
2018–2019	Moonlight Sonata by Ludwig van Beethoven choreo. by Daniil Gleikhengauz	Otoño Porteño by Astor Piazzolla choreo. by Daniil Gleikhengauz	Adagio (Denis Ten Tribute) by Lara Fabian
2017–2018	Carmen Fantasy by Pablo de Sarasate, Georges Bizet performed by David Garrett choreo. by Misha Ge	The Prayer by David Foster, Carole Bayer Sager, Alberto Testa, Tony Renis performed by Celine Dion and Andrea Bocelli	
2016–2017	I Got Rhythm by George Gershwin performed by Nikki Yanofsky choreo. by David Wilson, Mary Angela Larmer	Princess Mononoke by Joe Hisaishi choreo. by Tracy Wilson	Little Secret by Nikki Yanofsky
2015–2016	I Got Rhythm by George Gershwin performed by Nikki Yanofsky choreo. by David Wilson, Mary Angela Larmer; Send In the Clowns by Stephen Sondheim performed by Susan Boyle choreo. by Sergei Komolov	Papa, Can You Hear Me? (from Yentl) by Michel Legrand performed by Barbra Streisand choreo. by David Wilson, Mary Angela Larmer	Send in the Clowns by Stephen Sondheim performed by Susan Boyle choreo. by Sergei Komolov; I Got Rhythm by George Gershwin performed by Nikki Yanofsky choreo. by David Wilson, Mary Angela Larmer
2014–2015	Becoming a Geisha (from Memoirs of a Geisha) by John Williams choreo. by David Wilson, Mary Angela Larmer	Papa, Can You Hear Me? (from Yentl) by Michel Legrand performed by Barbra Streisand choreo. by David Wilson, Mary Angela Larmer	Send in the Clowns by Stephen Sondheim
2013–2014	Don't Cry for Me Argentina (Remix) (from Evita) by Andrew Lloyd Webber choreo. by Tracy Wilson	Crystallize; My Immortal; Spontaneous Me by Lindsey Stirling choreo. by Tracy Wilson	Poesia Di Venzia by Rondò Veneziano choreo. by Alexei Zheleznyakov
2012–2013	Peer Gynt by Edvard Grieg; Morning Mood; In the Hall of the Mountain King choreo. by Alexei Zheleznyakov	Dönmek (from Muhteşem Yüzyıl) by Aytekin Ataş; The Feeling Begins by Peter Gabriel; Harem by Sarah Brightman choreo. by Alexei Zheleznyakov	
2011–2012	Poesia Di Venzia by Rondò Veneziano choreo. by Alexei Zheleznyakov	Papirosen; Machrozet Yehodit by Amen choreo. by Alexei Zheleznyakov	

== Competitive highlights ==
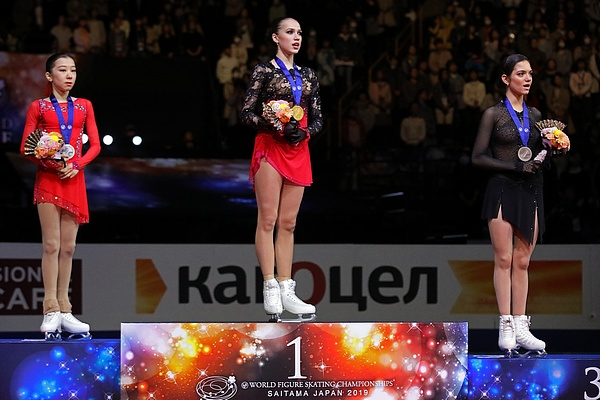
2019 World Championships podium: Tursynbaeva (left), Zagitova (centre), Medvedeva (right)

GP: Grand Prix; CS: Challenger Series; JGP: Junior Grand Prix

International
Event	13–14	14–15	15–16	16–17	17–18	18–19	19–20
Olympics					12th		
Worlds			12th	9th	11th	2nd	
Four Continents				8th	12th	2nd	
GP Cup of China							WD
GP France					5th		
GP NHK Trophy				8th			
GP Rostelecom				5th	8th	6th	
GP Skate America			4th				WD
GP Skate Canada			7th			5th	
CS Autumn Classic				3rd	3rd		
CS Finlandia						2nd	
CS Golden Spin			2nd				
CS Ice Star					1st		
CS Lombardia							WD
CS Ondrej Nepela						2nd	
CS Tallinn Trophy			2nd				
CS U.S. Classic			2nd	7th			
Asian Games				3rd			
Autumn Classic			1st				
Shanghai Trophy					2nd		2nd
Winter Universiade						2nd	
International: Junior
Youth Olympics			3rd				
Junior Worlds	11th	4th	5th	WD			
JGP Belarus	2nd						
JGP Estonia	5th						
JGP Germany		2nd					
JGP Japan		3rd					
Cup of Nice		1st					
Gardena Trophy	1st						
Merano Cup		1st					
New Year's Cup	1st						
NRW Trophy		1st					
Toruń Cup		1st					
Triglav Trophy	1st						
National
Kazakhstani Champ.		1st	1st	1st			
Team events
Team Challenge Cup			3rd T 6th P				

== Detailed results ==
=== Senior level ===
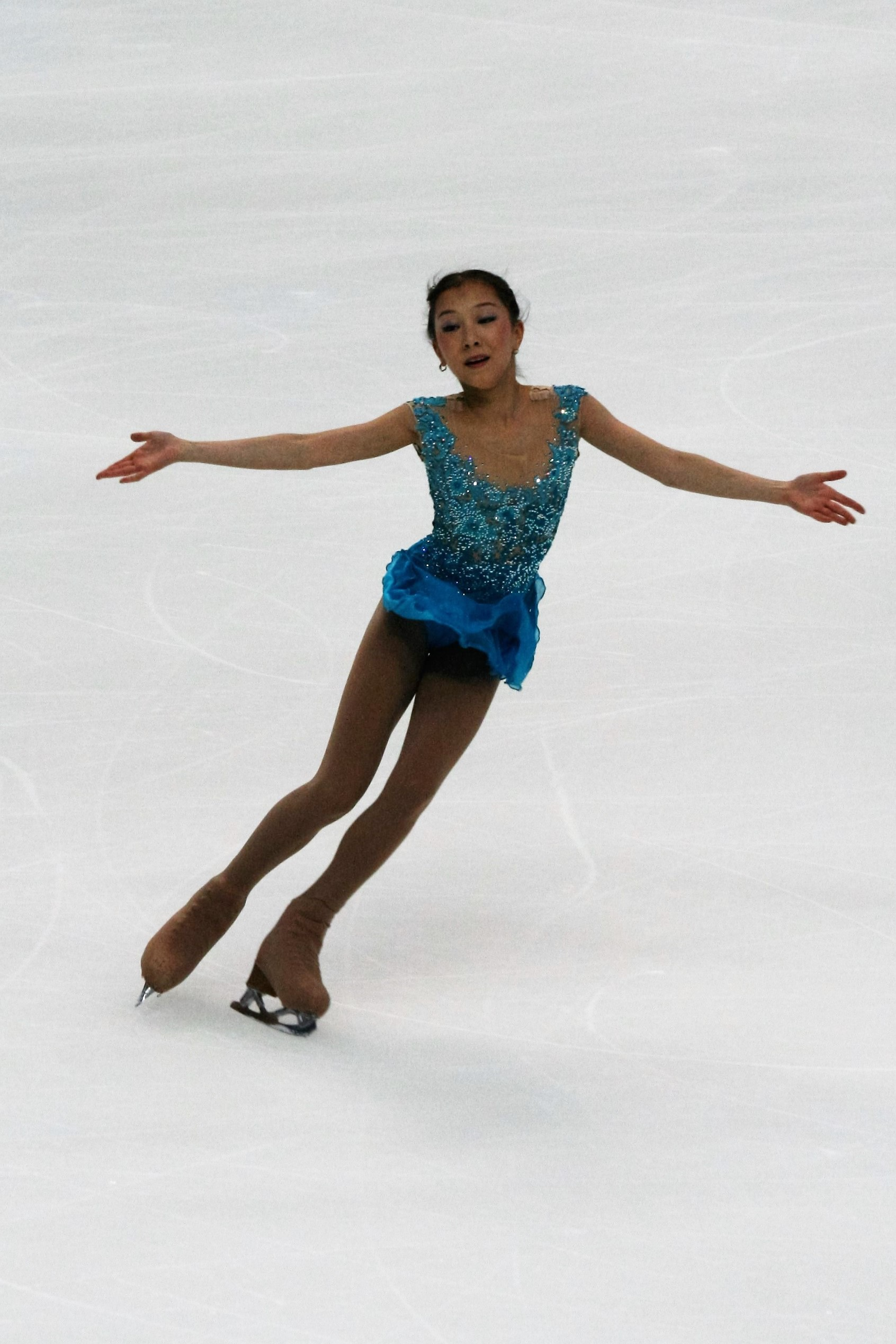
Tursynbaeva at the 2016 Rostelecom Cup

Small medals for short and free programs awarded only at ISU Championships. At team events, medals awarded for team results only.

2019-20 season
Date	Event	SP	FS	Total
3–5 October 2019	2019 Shanghai Trophy	2; 69.24	3; 116.85	2; 186.09
2018–19 season
Date	Event	SP	FS	Total
18–24 March 2019	2019 World Championships	3; 75.96	4; 148.80	2; 224.76
6–9 March 2019	2019 Winter Universiade	4; 67.57	1; 147.20	2; 214.22
7–10 February 2019	2019 Four Continents Championships	6; 68.09	3; 139.37	2; 207.46
16–18 November 2018	2018 Rostelecom Cup	4; 61.73	6; 118.72	6; 180.45
26–28 October 2018	2018 Skate Canada	6; 61.19	5; 124.52	5; 185.71
4–7 October 2018	2018 CS Finlandia Trophy	2; 70.95	1; 129.79	2; 200.74
19–22 September 2018	2018 CS Ondrej Nepela	2; 69.99	2; 122.31	2; 192.30
2017–18 season
Date	Event	SP	FS	Total
19–25 March 2018	2018 World Championships	11; 62.38	10; 124.47	11; 186.85
15–23 February 2018	2018 Winter Olympics	15; 58.82	13; 118.30	12; 177.12
22–28 January 2018	2018 Four Continents Championships	11; 56.52	13; 99.67	12; 156.19
17–19 November 2017	2017 Internationaux de France	6; 62.29	3; 138.69	5; 200.98
26–29 October 2017	2017 CS Minsk-Arena Ice Star	3; 60.62	1; 126.95	1; 187.57
20–22 October 2017	2017 Rostelecom Cup	6; 63.92	9; 121.03	8; 184.95
20–23 September 2017	2017 CS Autumn Classic	5; 56.62	3; 124.38	3; 181.00
2016–17 season
Date	Event	SP	FS	Total
29 March – 2 April 2017	2017 World Championships	10; 65.48	8; 126.51	9; 191.99
23–26 February 2017	2017 Asian Winter Games	6; 53.16	2; 121.88	3; 175.04
15–19 February 2017	2017 Four Continents Championships	3; 66.87	11; 109.78	8; 176.65
25–27 November 2016	2016 NHK Trophy	9; 55.66	6; 119.45	8; 175.11
4–6 November 2016	2016 Rostelecom Cup	4; 64.31	5; 117.01	5; 181.32
29 September – 1 October 2016	2016 CS Autumn Classic	2; 61.48	3; 110.98	3; 172.46
14–18 September 2016	2016 CS U.S. Classic	8; 48.33	9; 78.73	7; 127.06
2015–16 season
Date	Event	SP	FS	Total
22–23 April 2016	2016 Team Challenge Cup	6; 65.44	6; 123.61	6P/1T
28 March – 3 April 2016	2016 World Championships	12; 61.63	10; 121.99	12; 183.62
3–5 December 2015	2015 CS Golden Spin of Zagreb	3; 56.88	2; 119.45	2; 176.33
17–22 November 2015	2015 CS Tallinn Trophy	3; 57.48	2; 117.39	2; 174.87
30 October–1 November 2015	2015 Skate Canada International	12; 49.84	4; 115.32	7; 165.16
23–25 October 2015	2015 Skate America	7; 59.26	4; 119.30	4; 178.56
12–15 October 2015	2015 Skate Canada Autumn Classic	2; 59.23	1; 120.45	1; 179.72
16–20 September 2015	2015 CS U.S. Classic	4; 59.66	2; 118.25	2; 177.91

=== Junior level ===
2015–16 season
Date	Event	Level	SP	FS	Total
14–20 March 2016	2016 World Junior Championships	Junior	14; 50.11	4; 120.72	5; 170.83
12–21 February 2016	2016 Winter Youth Olympics	Junior	2; 59.11	3; 108.77	3; 167.88
2014–15 season
Date	Event	Level	SP	FS	Total
2–8 March 2015	2015 World Junior Championships	Junior	7; 55.95	4; 117.49	4; 173.44
7–10 January 2015	2015 Toruń Cup	Junior	1; 50.68	1; 96.82	1; 147.50
26–30 November 2014	2014 NRW Trophy	Junior	1; 58.72	1; 117.40	1; 176.12
14–16 November 2014	2014 Merano Cup	Junior	1; 51.02	1; 107.57	1; 158.59
15–19 October 2014	2014 International Cup of Nice	Junior	1; 46.81	1; 108.21	1; 155.02
1–5 October 2014	2014 JGP Germany	Junior	2; 55.31	2; 109.48	2; 164.79
11–14 September 2014	2014 JGP Japan	Junior	1; 59.25	5; 100.13	3; 159.38
2013–14 season
Date	Event	Level	SP	FS	Total
2–6 April 2014	2014 Triglav Trophy	Junior	1; 48.97	1; 101.71	1; 150.68
28–30 March 2014	2014 Gardena Spring Trophy	Junior	2; 52.01	1; 105.85	1; 157.86
10–16 March 2014	2014 World Junior Championships	Junior	16; 45.62	11; 96.10	11; 141.72
3–6 January 2014	2014 New Year's Cup	Junior	1; 48.96	1; 83.70	1; 132.66
13–15 October 2013	2013 JGP Estonia	Junior	6; 50.27	5; 95.58	5; 145.85
25–28 September 2013	2013 JGP Belarus	Junior	1; 53.22	3; 97.61	2; 150.83
2012–13 season
Date	Event	Level	SP	FS	Total
1–3 February 2013	2013 Russian Junior Championships	Junior	13; 53.73	13; 97.47	13; 151.20
