= Timothy Dolensky =

American figure skater (born 1992)

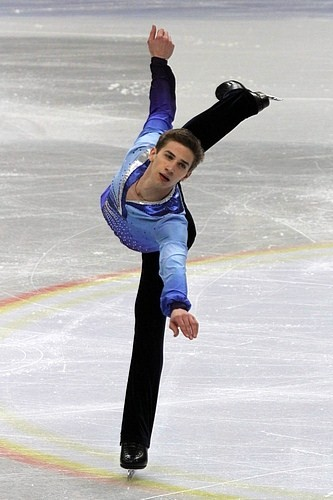
- Dolensky in 2012

Personal information
- Born: July 18, 1992 (age 34) Birmingham, Alabama, U.S.
- Home town: Kennesaw, Georgia, U.S.
- Height: 5 ft 7 in (1.70 m)

Figure skating career
- Country: United States
- Discipline: Men's singles
- Coach: Daniil Barantsev
- Skating club: Atlanta FSC
- Began skating: 1999
- Retired: April 17, 2019

Timothy "Tim" Dolensky (born July 18, 1992) is an American former figure skater. He is the 2012 U.S. junior silver medalist and placed 12th at the 2012 World Junior Championships.

== Early life and education ==
Timothy Dolensky was born July 18, 1992, in Birmingham, Alabama. He studied at Kennesaw State University, majoring in exercise and health science.

== Career ==
=== Early years ===
Dolensky began skating at age six after a school trip to an ice rink. He competed nationally on the juvenile level in the 2004–05 season and on the intermediate level the following season. He moved up to the novice level in the 2007–08 season and won the bronze medal at the 2010 U.S. Championships.

=== Junior career ===
In the 2010−11 season, Dolensky was assigned to his first ISU Junior Grand Prix (JGP) competition, in Sheffield, England, and finished 4th at the event.

Dolensky composed his own music, Windfall, for his 2011−12 short program. He competed at two JGP events, winning bronze in Riga, Latvia and placing 4th in Innsbruck, Austria. He was awarded the silver medal in the junior event at the 2012 U.S. Championships and was sent to the 2012 World Junior Championships. Dolensky finished 12th overall at the event in Minsk, Belarus, having ranked 9th in the short program and 13th in the free skate.

=== Senior career ===
Dolensky placed fourth in his senior international debut at the 2012 U.S. Classic.

He composed his 2014–15 short program music, Bella Luce. In October, he finished fourth at the 2014 Skate Canada Autumn Classic, his first ISU Challenger Series event. He sustained a concussion on November 12, 2014, as a result of a collision with another skater in Kennesaw, Georgia.

Competing in the 2015–16 ISU Challenger Series, Dolensky placed fourth at both the 2015 U.S. International Classic and at the 2015 Finlandia Trophy. He appeared at the 2015 Skate Canada International as a replacement for the injured Joshua Farris. Making his Grand Prix debut, he placed 11th in the short program, 6th in the free skate, and 7th overall. He also finished 7th at the 2016 U.S. Championships.

Dolensky placed 8th at the 2016 Skate America and 7th at the 2017 U.S. Championships.

In the 2017–18 season, Dolensky placed 6th at the 2017 CS U.S. International Classic. and 7th at the 2018 U.S. Championships.

He finished 6th at the 2019 U.S. Championships and announced that he would be stepping away from competitive figure skating on April 17, 2019.

Famously, Adriene Ott introduced Tim to his now wife, Sarah Dalton Dolensky. He skated professionally for Disney on Ice: Mickey's Search Party before his official professional skating retirement in September of 2023.

== Personal life ==
Dolensky plays the violin and piano.

== Programs ==
Season	Short program	Free skating
2018–2019	Spark by Amber Run choreo. by Daniil Barantsev	Faux by Novo Amor, Ed Tullett; Faux (remix) by Said the Sky
2017–2018	Awake My Soul by Mumford & Sons choreo. by Ryan Jahnke	Faux by Novo Amor, Ed Tullett; Faux (remix) by Said the Sky
2016–2017	Awake My Soul by Mumford & Sons choreo. by Ryan Jahnke	Sometimes I Dream by Mario Frangoulis choreo. by Brittney Bottoms
2015–2016	Cinema Paradiso by Josh Groban	Orchestral Variations on Themes of Chopin by Anže Rozman
2014–2015	Bella Luce by Timothy Dolensky	Orchestral Variations on Themes of Chopin by Anže Rozman
2012–2013	Beyond the Sea by Charles Trenet	Il Postino by Luis Bacalov; Payadora by Lisandro Adrover
2011–2012	Windfall by Timothy Dolensky	Havana by Dave Grusin
2010–2011	Face au Canon Mobile (from The General) by Joe Hisaishi	Warsaw Concerto performed by Frank Chacksfield and his orchestra
2009–2010	Flamenko by Didulya	Warsaw Concerto performed by Frank Chacksfield and his orchestra

== Competitive highlights ==
GP: Grand Prix; CS: Challenger Series; JGP: Junior Grand Prix

International
Event	10–11	11–12	12–13	13–14	14–15	15–16	16–17	17–18	18–19
GP Skate America							8th		
GP Skate Canada						7th			
CS Lombardia									6th
CS Autumn Classic					4th				
CS Finlandia						4th			
CS Golden Spin							6th		
CS Nebelhorn							7th		4th
CS U.S. Classic						4th		6th	
Philadelphia								1st	3rd
U.S. Classic			4th						
International: Junior
Junior Worlds		12th							
JGP Austria		4th							
JGP Latvia		3rd							
JGP U.K.	4th								
National
U.S. Championships		2nd J		13th	14th	7th	7th	7th	6th
Levels: N = Novice; J = Junior

== Detailed results ==
Small medals for short and free programs awarded only at ISU Championships.

2018–19 season
Date	Event	SP	FS	Total
Jan. 19 - 27, 2019	2019 U.S. Championships	6; 81.10	7; 147.84	6; 228.94
26–29 September 2018	2018 CS Nebelhorn Trophy	5; 67.80	4; 141.22	4; 209.02
12–16 September 2018	2018 CS Lombardia Trophy	6; 71.06	6; 126.31	6; 197.37
August 3–5, 2018	2018 Philadelphia Summer International	1; 68.26	5; 129.94	3; 198.20
2017–18 season
Date	Event	SP	FS	Total
Dec. 29 – Jan. 8, 2018	2018 U.S. Championships	7; 85.06	9; 151.27	7; 236.33
September 13–17, 2017	2017 CS U.S. International Classic	4; 78.75	6; 136.19	6; 214.94
August 3–5, 2017	2017 Philadelphia Summer International	1; 75.38	1; 153.84	1; 229.22
2016–17 season
Date	Event	SP	FS	Total
January 14–22, 2017	2017 U.S. Championships	6; 78.86	9; 149.90	7; 228.76
December 7–10, 2016	2016 CS Golden Spin of Zagreb	5; 75.36	6; 144.06	6; 219.42
October 21–23, 2016	2016 Skate America	6; 77.59	8; 148.90	8; 226.53
September 22–24, 2016	2016 CS Nebelhorn Trophy	7; 67.76	4; 139.73	7; 207.49
2015–16 season
Date	Event	SP	FS	Total
January 16–24, 2016	2016 U.S. Championships	5; 80.01	7; 156.12	7; 236.13
October 30 – November 1, 2015	2015 GP Skate Canada	11; 62.46	6; 156.60	7; 219.06
October 9–11, 2015	2015 CS Finlandia Trophy	6; 66.52	3; 144.03	4; 210.55
September 16–20, 2015	2015 CS U.S. Classic	4; 69.18	4; 139.86	4; 209.04
2014–15 season
Date	Event	SP	FS	Total
January 18–25, 2015	2015 U.S. Championships	13; 68.41	14; 124.97	14; 193.38
October 15–16, 2014	2014 Autumn Classic	8; 63.69	4; 133.24	4; 196.53
2013–14 season
Date	Event	SP	FS	Total
January 5–12, 2014	2014 U.S. Championships	13; 61.76	13; 123.08	13; 184.84
2012–13 season
Date	Event	SP	FS	Total
September 13–16, 2012	2012 U.S. Classic	5; 63.68	4; 139.91	4; 203.59

2011–12 season
Date	Event	SP	FS	Total
February 27 – March 4, 2012	2012 World Junior Championships	9; 57.73	13; 112.21	12; 169.94
January 22–29, 2012	2012 U.S. Championships	1; 63.20	3; 124.64	2; 187.84
Sept. 28 – October 1, 2011	2011 Junior Grand Prix, Austria	8; 54.35	5; 113.79	4; 168.14
August 31 – September 3, 2011	2011 Junior Grand Prix Latvia	4; 56.52	3; 120.25	3; 176.77
2010–11 season
Date	Event	SP	FS	Total
September 29 – October 3, 2010	2010 Junior Grand Prix U.K.	5; 51.94	5; 105.13	4; 157.07
