= Élisabeth Paradis =

Canadian ice dancer

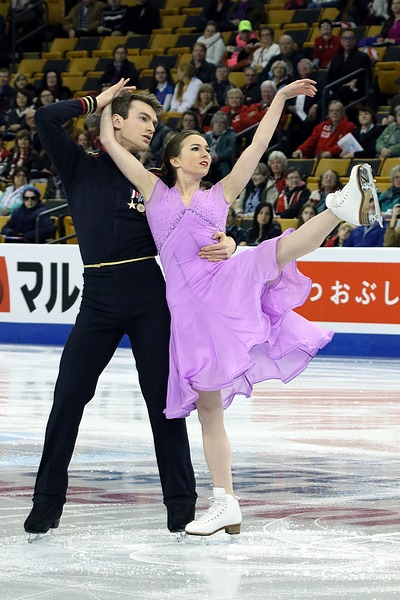
- François-Xavier Ouellette and Paradis at the 2016 World Championships

Personal information
- Born: July 15, 1992 (age 33) Loretteville, Quebec, Canada
- Height: 1.60 m (5 ft 3 in)

Figure skating career
- Country: Canada
- Coach: Patrice Lauzon, Marie-France Dubreuil, Pascal Denis, Romain Haguenauer
- Skating club: CPA Loretteville Quebec; Gadbois Centre
- Began skating: 1997
- Retired: 2016

Élisabeth Paradis (born July 15, 1992) is a Canadian former competitive ice dancer. With François-Xavier Ouellette, she won bronze medals at the 2015 CS U.S. International Classic and at the 2016 Canadian Nationals.

== Career ==
=== Early career ===
Paradis skated with Tristan Laliberté from the 2007–08 season through 2009–10. They won the 2009 Canadian novice silver medal and placed 14th on the junior level the following year.

=== Partnership with François-Xavier Ouellette ===
Paradis began competing with François-Xavier Ouellette in the 2010–11 season. Appearing on the junior level, they placed 5th at the 2011 Canadian Nationals and 6th in 2012. They moved up to the senior level in the 2012–13 season.

Making their international debut, Paradis/Ouellette placed fifth at the 2013 International Cup of Nice. They finished 8th at the 2014 Canadian Nationals.

Paradis/Ouellette began the 2014–15 season at an ISU Challenger Series (CS) event, the 2014 Nebelhorn Trophy, finishing fifth, and then appeared on the Grand Prix (GP) series, having received two assignments. They finished fourth overall at the 2014 Skate America (8th in the short dance, 4th in the free), and 7th at the 2014 Skate Canada International. They placed fifth at the 2015 Canadian Nationals.

In 2015–16, Paradis/Ouellette won bronze at their CS assignment, the 2015 U.S. International Classic. They were eighth at their sole GP event, the 2015 Skate Canada International. In January 2016, they placed fourth in the short dance and third in the free at the Canadian Nationals in Halifax, Nova Scotia, winning the bronze medal by a margin of 0.22 over Alexandra Paul / Mitchell Islam.

Paradis/Ouellette announced the end of their partnership on September 7, 2016.

== Programs ==
(with Ouellette)

Season	Short dance	Free dance	Exhibition
2015–16	Lost by Anouk, Bart van Veen; Kill by Martin Enk Gjerstad choreo. by Marie-France Dubreuil, Patrice Lauzon	Bridge over Troubled Water by Simon & Garfunkel; Composition by Karl Hugo van der Kerkhove choreo. by Marie-France Dubreuil, Patrice Lauzon	
2014–15	Paso doble: Marcarenas; Flamenco: Eclipse de Luna	Un peu plus haut by Jean-Pierre Ferland; Composition by Karl-Hugo van de Kerckhove	Speak Softly, Love (from The Godfather) sung by Katherine Jenkins
2013–14	He Loves and She Loves; Dancin' Fool	Speak Softly, Love (from The Godfather) sung by Katherine Jenkins	
2012–13	Come Away with Me by Norah Jones; Black Horse and the Cherry Tree by KT Tunstall	High Hopes; Run Like Hell by Pink Floyd	
2011–12	Black Magic Woman; Oye Cómo Va	Heartbreak Hotel; Blue Suede Shoes by Elvis Presley	
2010–11	She's Always a Woman	Bei Mir Bistu Shein	

== Competitive highlights ==
GP: Grand Prix; CS: Challenger Series

=== With Ouellette ===
International
Event	10–11	11–12	12–13	13–14	14–15	15–16
Worlds						23rd
Four Continents						6th
GP Skate America					4th	
GP Skate Canada					7th	8th
CS Nebelhorn					5th	
CS U.S. Classic						3rd
Cup of Nice				5th		
National
Canadian Champ.	5th J	6th J	7th	8th	5th	3rd
SC Challenge	6th J	1st J	1st	4th		

=== With Laliberté ===
National
Event	2009–10
Canadian Championships	14th J
Skate Canada Challenge	13th J
