= Disappearance and killing of Emily Pike =

2025 disappearance and death

- Location: Mesa, Arizona, United States
- Date: January 27, 2025; 7:45 pm (MST)
- Deaths: Emily Pike
- Perpetrator: Under investigation
- Motive: Under investigation

On February 14, 2025, the remains of 14-year old Emily Pike were found off Highway 60 in the state of Arizona. The death is being investigated as a homicide.

== Background ==
Emily Pike was a 14-year old Native American resident of the San Carlos Apache Indian Reservation. According to her mother, Steff Dosela, she had an interest in art and was planning to go to college. At the time of her 2025 disappearance, she lived at a group home (for girls ages 7-18) in Mesa, Arizona. Pike was last seen on January 27, 2025 at 7:45 pm, and according to the police department, she left the home on foot, wearing a pink and gray shirt. Video surveillance cameras captured images of Pike after she left, but authorities would not reveal where. Pike's case manager informed her mother of her daughter's disappearance a week later. Mesa police stated Pike had a history of fleeing from the group home, and reports indicate that she had run away from the group home four previous times before her murder. In November 2023, officers also responded to a call about a suicide attempt.

Pike was originally placed in the group home, located over 100 miles away from her home, in September 2023 by Tribal Social Services after reporting being sexually assaulted. Instead of police, tribal game and fish rangers arrived. A suspect was never arrested, the case was dropped, and Emily was removed from her home. She and another child were reported missing on September 11, 2023, and found at Kleinman Park, stating they didn't want to return. Nine days later, Pike went missing again and was found out walking; bodycamera footage shows Pike pleading with officers not to take her back to the group home, telling officers she wanted to be with her grandmother. She was reported missing again on October 31, but hours later, police were told that she had returned.

== Discovery of remains and investigation ==
On January 27, 2025, the Gila County Sheriff's Office (GCSO) announced that hikers had found in contractor trash bags the remains of an "unidentified female," later identified as Pike, off of Highway 60 on February 14. Detectives were unable to find her arms and hands, and an autopsy showed that she had face and head trauma. The GCSO stated it was investigating the death as a homicide. According to Dosela, no one has been arrested in relation to the killing, but three potential suspects are being interrogated.

Private information related to the investigation was leaked and spread on Facebook, according to the GCSO.

== Response ==
Foster care advocates wrapped yellow ribbons on poles close to the location where Pike was last seen on March 2. Anika Robinson, who owned a non-profit that served Pike beginning in 2023, stated that a reason for fleeing was due to wanting "a sense of some independence."

== Sources ==
- Blanchet, Brenton (2 March 2025). "Mother Remembers Teenage Daughter After Her Remains Are Found in Arizona: 'She Was Just a Baby'". People.
- Rissman, Kelly (1 March 2025). "Remains of Arizona girl, 14, found weeks after she disappeared". The Independent.
- Smetana, Wren (27 February 2025). "Human remains found near Globe identified as missing girl from tribe". The Arizona Republic.
