= 2013–14 ISU Grand Prix of Figure Skating =

- Type: Grand Prix
- Date: October 18 – December 8, 2013
- Season: 2013–14
- Previous: 2012–13 Grand Prix
- Next: 2014–15 Grand Prix

The 2013–14 ISU Grand Prix of Figure Skating was a series of senior international figure skating competitions in the 2013–14 season. Medals were awarded in the disciplines of men's singles, ladies' singles, pair skating, and ice dancing. Skaters earned points based on their placement at each event and the top six in each discipline qualified to compete at the Grand Prix Final, held in Fukuoka, Japan.

Organized by the International Skating Union, the Grand Prix series began October 18 and continued until December 8, 2013. Skaters competed for medals, prize money, and a chance to compete in the Grand Prix Final. The series set the stage for the 2014 European, Four Continents, the World Championships, as well as the 2014 Winter Olympics and each country's national championships.

The corresponding series for junior-level skaters was the 2013–14 ISU Junior Grand Prix.

== Schedule ==
The ISU announced the following schedule of events taking place in autumn 2013:

Date	Event	Location
October 18–20	2013 Skate America	(United States) Detroit, USA
October 25–27	2013 Skate Canada International	Saint John, Canada
November 1–3	2013 Cup of China	Beijing, China
November 8–10	2013 NHK Trophy	Tokyo, Japan
November 15–17	2013 Trophée Éric Bompard	Paris, France
November 22–24	2013 Rostelecom Cup	Moscow, Russia
December 5–8	2013–14 Grand Prix Final	Fukuoka, Japan

== General requirements ==
Skaters who reached the age of 14 by July 1, 2013 were eligible to compete on the senior Grand Prix circuit. Prior to competing in a Grand Prix event, skaters were required to have earned the following scores:

Discipline	Minimum
Men	160.68
Ladies	130.98
Pairs	135.42
Ice dance	113.73
Minimums not required for host country skaters. Skaters who need the minimum score may compete at: U.S. International F.S. Classic; 2012 Nebelhorn Trophy; 2012 Ondrej Nepela Memorial; 2012 Finlandia Trophy (no pairs event); 2012 Cup of Nice

== Assignments ==
The International Skating Union released the initial list of Grand Prix assignments on June 3, 2013:

=== Men ===
Skater	Assignment(s)
Max Aaron	Skate America, NHK Trophy
Jeremy Abbott	Skate Canada International, NHK Trophy
Florent Amodio	Cup of China, Trophée Éric Bompard
Elladj Balde	Skate Canada International
Chafik Besseghier	~~NHK Trophy, Trophée Éric Bompard~~
Michal Březina	Skate Canada International, Trophée Éric Bompard
Jason Brown	Skate America (added)
Patrick Chan	Skate Canada International, Trophée Éric Bompard
Richard Dornbush	Cup of China, Rostelecom Cup
Joshua Farris	Skate Canada International, Rostelecom Cup
Javier Fernández	NHK Trophy, Rostelecom Cup
Artur Gachinski	Skate America, Rostelecom Cup (added)
Misha Ge	Rostelecom Cup (added)
Yan Han	Cup of China, Trophée Éric Bompard
Yuzuru Hanyu	Skate Canada International, Trophée Éric Bompard
Brian Joubert	~~Skate America, Rostelecom Cup~~
Maxim Kovtun	Cup of China, Rostelecom Cup
Takahiko Kozuka	Skate America, Cup of China
Peter Liebers	Cup of China, Rostelecom Cup
Evan Lysacek	~~Skate America~~
Tatsuki Machida	Skate America, Rostelecom Cup
Konstantin Menshov	NHK Trophy, Rostelecom Cup (added)
Ross Miner	Skate Canada International, ~~Trophée Éric Bompard~~
Takahito Mura	Skate Canada International, NHK Trophy
Alexander Majorov	Skate America
Nobunari Oda	Skate Canada International, NHK Trophy
Evgeni Plushenko	~~Rostelecom Cup~~
Romain Ponsart	~~Trophée Éric Bompard~~
Kevin Reynolds	~~Cup of China, Rostelecom Cup~~
Adam Rippon	Skate America, NHK Trophy
Andrei Rogozine	Skate Canada International
Song Nan	Cup of China, Trophée Éric Bompard
Daisuke Takahashi	Skate America, NHK Trophy
Denis Ten	~~Skate America,~~ Cup of China
Sergei Voronov	NHK Trophy
Wang Yi	Cup of China

=== Ladies ===
Skater	Assignment(s)
Samantha Cesario	Skate America, Trophée Éric Bompard (added)
Christina Gao	Skate Canada International, Trophée Éric Bompard
Bingwa Geng	Cup of China
Elene Gedevanishvili	Skate America, NHK Trophy
Gracie Gold	Skate Canada International, NHK Trophy
Lenaelle Gilleron-Gorry	Trophée Éric Bompard
Nikol Gosviani	Cup of China (added), Rostelecom Cup (added)
Joshi Helgesson	Cup of China
Viktoria Helgesson	Skate America, Trophée Éric Bompard
Courtney Hicks	Skate Canada International (added)
Haruka Imai	Rostelecom Cup
Polina Korobeinikova	~~Cup of China~~
Carolina Kostner	Cup of China, Rostelecom Cup
Amelie Lacoste	Skate Canada International, Trophée Éric Bompard (added)
Alena Leonova	~~Skate Canada International,~~ NHK Trophy
Li Zijun	Cup of China, ~~NHK Trophy~~
Yulia Lipnitskaya	Skate Canada International, Rostelecom Cup
Veronik Mallet	Skate Canada International
Valentina Marchei	Skate America, NHK Trophy
Mae Berenice Meite	Skate America, Trophée Éric Bompard
Satoko Miyahara	NHK Trophy, Rostelecom Cup
Kanako Murakami	Cup of China, Rostelecom Cup
Mirai Nagasu	NHK Trophy, Rostelecom Cup
Kaetlyn Osmond	~~Skate Canada International, Rostelcom Cup~~
Anna Pogorilaya	Cup of China, Trophée Éric Bompard
Natalia Popova	Skate Canada International (added), Trophée Éric Bompard (added)
Yuna Kim	~~Skate Canada International~~, ~~Trophée Éric Bompard~~
Mao Asada	Skate America, NHK Trophy
Elena Radionova	Skate America, NHK Trophy
Yretha Silete	Trophée Éric Bompard
Adelina Sotnikova	Cup of China, Trophée Éric Bompard
Akiko Suzuki	Skate Canada International, NHK Trophy
Elizaveta Tuktamysheva	Skate America, Rostelecom Cup
Ashley Wagner	Skate America, Trophée Éric Bompard
Agnes Zawadzki	Cup of China, Rostelecom Cup
Caroline Zhang	Skate America
Zhang Kexin	Cup of China

=== Pairs ===
Pair	Assignment(s)
Julia Antipova / Nodari Maisuradze	Rostelecom Cup
Vera Bazarova / Yuri Larionov	Trophée Éric Bompard, Rostelecom Cup
Stefania Berton / Ondrej Hotarek	Skate America, Skate Canada International
Marissa Castelli / Simon Shnapir	Skate America, NHK Trophy
Lindsay Davis / Rockne Brubaker	Skate Canada International, Rostelecom Cup (added)
Nicole Della Monica / Matteo Guarise	Trophée Éric Bompard
Caydee Denney / John Coughlin	Skate America, Trophée Éric Bompard
Haven Denney / Brandon Frazier	Skate Canada International (added), NHK Trophy
Meagan Duhamel / Eric Radford	Skate Canada International, Trophée Éric Bompard
Vanessa James / Morgan Cipres	~~Skate America~~, Trophée Éric Bompard
Yuko Kavaguti / Alexander Smirnov	~~Skate Canada International, NHK Trophy~~
Paige Lawrence / Rudi Swiegers	Skate Canada International, NHK Trophy
Anastasia Martiusheva / Alexei Rogonov	Cup of China, NHK Trophy (added)
Kirsten Moore-Towers / Dylan Moscovitch	Skate America, Rostelecom Cup
Pang Qing / Jian Tong	Cup of China, Trophée Éric Bompard
Peng Cheng / Zhang Hao	Cup of China, NHK Trophy
Daria Popova / Bruno Massot	Cup of China, ~~Trophée Éric Bompard~~
Annabelle Prolss / Ruben Blommaert	Trophée Éric Bompard (added)
Margaret Purdy / Michael Marinaro	Skate America (added), Skate Canada International
Natasha Purich / Mervin Tran	Trophée Éric Bompard
Aliona Savchenko / Robin Szolkowy	Cup of China, Rostelecom Cup
Alexa Scimeca / Chris Knierim	Cup of China, Rostelecom Cup
Britney Simpson / Matthew Blackmer	~~Rostelecom Cup~~
Ksenia Stolbova / Fedor Klimov	Skate America, Rostelecom Cup
Sui Wenjing / Han Cong	Skate Canada International, NHK Trophy
Narumi Takahashi / Ryuichi Kihara	NHK Trophy, Rostelecom Cup
Mari Vartmann / Aaron Van Cleave	Skate Canada International
Tatiana Volosozhar / Maxim Trankov	Skate America, NHK Trophy
Felicia Zhang / Nathan Bartholomay	Cup of China

=== Ice dance ===
Team	Assignment(s)
Alexandra Aldridge / Daniel Eaton	Cup of China
Ekaterina Bobrova / Dmitri Soloviev	Cup of China, Rostelecom Cup
Pernelle Carron / Lloyd Jones	Skate America, Cup of China
Anna Cappellini / Luca Lanotte	Skate America, NHK Trophy
Madison Chock / Evan Bates	Cup of China, Rostelecom Cup
Penny Coomes / Nicholas Buckland	Trophée Éric Bompard
Meryl Davis / Charlie White	Skate America, NHK Trophy
Piper Gilles / Paul Poirier	NHK Trophy, Rostelcom Cup
Siobhan Heekin-Canedy / Dmitri Dun	Rostelcom Cup
Elena Ilinykh / Nikita Katsalapov	NHK Trophy, Trophée Éric Bompard
Tanja Kolbe / Stefano Caruso	NHK Trophy
Ksenia Monko / Kirill Khaliavin	Trophée Éric Bompard
Nicole Orford / Thomas Williams	Trophée Éric Bompard
Alexandra Paul / Mitchell Islam	Skate Canada International
Gabriella Papadakis / Guillaume Cizeron	Rostelecom Cup
Nathalie Pechalat / Fabian Bourzat	Cup of China, Trophée Éric Bompard
Cathy Reed / Chris Reed	Skate America
Ekaterina Riazanova / Ilia Tkachenko	Rostelecom Cup
Maia Shibutani / Alex Shibutani	Skate America, NHK Trophy
Victoria Sinitsina / Ruslan Zhiganshin	NHK Trophy
Isabella Tobias / Deividas Stagniūnas	Skate America
Tessa Virtue / Scott Moir	Skate Canada International, Trophée Éric Bompard
Kaitlyn Weaver / Andrew Poje	Skate Canada International, Rostelecom Cup
Yu Xiaoyang / Wang Chen	Cup of China
Nelli Zhiganshina / Alexander Gazsi	Skate Canada International, Trophée Éric Bompard
Julia Zlobina / Alexei Sitnikov	Skate America

=== Changes to preliminary assignments ===
==== Skate America ====
- Evan Lysacek withdrew and was replaced by Jason Brown.
- Vanessa James / Morgan Cipres withdrew and were replaced by Margaret Purdy / Michael Marinaro.
- Brian Joubert withdrew. No replacement was made.
- Denis Ten withdrew due to illness. No replacement was made.

==== Skate Canada International ====
- Yuna Kim and Kiira Korpi withdrew. They were replaced by Courtney Hicks and Natalia Popova.
- Yuko Kavaguti / Alexander Smirnov withdrew due to an injury to Smirnov. They were replaced by Haven Denney / Brandon Frazier.
- Alena Leonova withdrew due to a leg injury. No replacement was made.

==== Cup of China ====
- Polina Korobeynikova withdrew and was replaced by Nikol Gosviani.
- Geng Bingwa withdrew and was replaced by Guo Xiaowen.
- Kevin Reynolds withdrew. No replacement was made.

==== NHK Trophy ====
- Yuko Kavaguti / Alexander Smirnov withdrew due to an injury to Smirnov. Anastasia Martiusheva / Alexei Rogonov were named to replace them.
- Li Zijun withdrew. No replacement was made.
- Chafik Besseghier withdrew. No replacement was made.

==== Trophée Éric Bompard ====
- Yuna Kim and Kiira Korpi withdrew. They were replaced by Amelie Lacoste and Natalia Popova.
- Ross Miner withdrew. No replacement was made.
- Chafik Besseghier and Romain Ponsart withdrew.
- Annabelle Prolss / Ruben Blommaert replaced Daria Popova / Bruno Massot.

==== Rostelecom Cup ====
- Artur Gachinski, Nikol Gosviani, Ksenia Monko / Kirill Khaliavin, and Ksenia Stolbova / Fedor Klimov were selected later as host picks.
- Kevin Reynolds withdrew. He was replaced by Misha Ge.
- On 13 November, it was announced that Evgeni Plushenko had withdrawn due to injury. He was replaced by Konstantin Menshov.
- Brian Joubert withdrew. No replacement was made.
- Kaetlyn Osmond withdrew. No replacement was made.
- Britney Simpson / Matthew Blackmer withdrew and were replaced by Lindsay Davis / Rockne Brubaker.

== Medal summary ==
Event	Discipline	Gold	Silver	Bronze
Skate America	Men	(Japan) Tatsuki Machida	(United States) Adam Rippon	(United States) Max Aaron
Skate America	Ladies	(Japan) Mao Asada	(United States) Ashley Wagner	(Russia) Elena Radionova
Skate America	Pairs	(Russia) Tatiana Volosozhar / Maxim Trankov	(Canada) Kirsten Moore-Towers / Dylan Moscovitch	(Russia) Ksenia Stolbova / Fedor Klimov
Skate America	Ice dancing	(United States) Meryl Davis / Charlie White	(Italy) Anna Cappellini / Luca Lanotte	(United States) Maia Shibutani / Alex Shibutani

Event	Discipline	Gold	Silver	Bronze
Skate Canada	Men	(Canada) Patrick Chan	(Japan) Yuzuru Hanyu	(Japan) Nobunari Oda
Skate Canada	Ladies	(Russia) Yulia Lipnitskaya	(Japan) Akiko Suzuki	(United States) Gracie Gold
Skate Canada	Pairs	(Italy) Stefania Berton / Ondrej Hotarek	(China) Sui Wenjing / Han Cong	(Canada) Meagan Duhamel / Eric Radford
Skate Canada	Ice dancing	(Canada) Tessa Virtue / Scott Moir	(Canada) Kaitlyn Weaver / Andrew Poje	(United States) Madison Hubbell / Zachary Donohue

Event	Discipline	Gold	Silver	Bronze
Cup of China	Men	(China) Yan Han	(Russia) Maxim Kovtun	(Japan) Takahiko Kozuka
Cup of China	Ladies	(Russia) Anna Pogorilaya	(Russia) Adelina Sotnikova	(Italy) Carolina Kostner
Cup of China	Pairs	(Germany) Aliona Savchenko / Robin Szolkowy	(China) Pang Qing / Tong Jian	(China) Peng Cheng / Zhang Hao
Cup of China	Ice dancing	(France) Nathalie Péchalat / Fabian Bourzat	(Russia) Ekaterina Bobrova / Dmitri Soloviev	(United States) Madison Chock / Evan Bates

Event	Discipline	Gold	Silver	Bronze
NHK Trophy	Men	(Japan) Daisuke Takahashi	(Japan) Nobunari Oda	(United States) Jeremy Abbott
NHK Trophy	Ladies	(Japan) Mao Asada	(Russia) Elena Radionova	(Japan) Akiko Suzuki
NHK Trophy	Pairs	(Russia) Tatiana Volosozhar / Maxim Trankov	(China) Peng Cheng / Zhang Hao	(China) Sui Wenjing / Han Cong
NHK Trophy	Ice dancing	(United States) Meryl Davis / Charlie White	(Italy) Anna Cappellini / Luca Lanotte	(United States) Maia Shibutani / Alex Shibutani

Event	Discipline	Gold	Silver	Bronze
Trophée Eric Bompard	Men	(Canada) Patrick Chan	(Japan) Yuzuru Hanyu	(United States) Jason Brown
Trophée Eric Bompard	Ladies	(United States) Ashley Wagner	(Russia) Adelina Sotnikova	(Russia) Anna Pogorilaya
Trophée Eric Bompard	Pairs	(China) Pang Qing / Tong Jian	(Canada) Meagan Duhamel / Eric Radford	(United States) Caydee Denney / John Coughlin
Trophée Eric Bompard	Ice dancing	(Canada) Tessa Virtue / Scott Moir	(Russia) Elena Ilinykh / Nikita Katsalapov	(France) Nathalie Pechalat / Fabian Bourzat

Event	Discipline	Gold	Silver	Bronze
Rostelecom Cup	Men	(Japan) Tatsuki Machida	(Russia) Maxim Kovtun	(Spain) Javier Fernández
Rostelecom Cup	Ladies	(Russia) Yulia Lipnitskaya	(Italy) Carolina Kostner	(United States) Mirai Nagasu
Rostelecom Cup	Pairs	(Germany) Aliona Savchenko / Robin Szolkowy	(Russia) Vera Bazarova / Yuri Larionov	(Canada) Kirsten Moore-Towers / Dylan Moscovitch
Rostelecom Cup	Ice dancing	(Russia) Ekaterina Bobrova / Dmitri Soloviev	(Canada) Kaitlyn Weaver / Andrew Poje	(United States) Madison Chock / Evan Bates

Event	Discipline	Gold	Silver	Bronze
Grand Prix Final	Men	(Japan) Yuzuru Hanyu	(Canada) Patrick Chan	(Japan) Nobunari Oda
Grand Prix Final	Ladies	(Japan) Mao Asada	(Russia) Yulia Lipnitskaya	(United States) Ashley Wagner
Grand Prix Final	Pairs	(Germany) Aliona Savchenko / Robin Szolkowy	(Russia) Tatiana Volosozhar / Maxim Trankov	(China) Pang Qing / Tong Jian
Grand Prix Final	Ice dancing	(United States) Meryl Davis / Charlie White	(Canada) Tessa Virtue / Scott Moir	(France) Nathalie Péchalat / Fabian Bourzat

== Qualification ==
At each event, skaters earned points toward qualification for the Grand Prix Final. Following the sixth event, the top six highest scoring skaters/teams advanced to the Final. The points earned per placement were as follows:

Placement	Points (Singles/Dance)	Points (Pairs)
1st	15	15
2nd	13	13
3rd	11	11
4th	9	9
5th	7	7
6th	5	5
7th	4	-
8th	3	-
9th	-	–
10th	-	–

There were seven tie-breakers in cases of a tie in overall points:

1. Highest placement at an event. If a skater placed 1st and 3rd, the tiebreaker is the 1st place, and that beats a skater who placed 2nd in both events.
2. Highest combined total scores in both events. If a skater earned 200 points at one event and 250 at a second, that skater would win in the second tie-break over a skater who earned 200 points at one event and 150 at another.
3. Participated in two events.
4. Highest combined scores in the free skating/free dancing portion of both events.
5. Highest individual score in the free skating/free dancing portion from one event.
6. Highest combined scores in the short program/short dance of both events.
7. Highest number of total participants at the events.

If a tie remained, it was considered unbreakable and the tied skaters all advanced to the Grand Prix Final.

=== Qualification standings ===
Bold denotes Grand Prix Final qualification.

Points	Men	Ladies	Pairs	Ice dance
30	(Canada) **Patrick Chan** (Japan) **Tatsuki Machida**	(Japan) **Mao Asada** (Russia) **Yulia Lipnitskaya**	(Russia) **Tatiana Volosozhar / Maxim Trankov** (Germany) **Aliona Savchenko / Robin Szolkowy**	(United States) **Meryl Davis / Charlie White** (Canada) **Tessa Virtue / Scott Moir**
28		(United States) **Ashley Wagner**	(China) **Pang Qing / Jian Tong**	(Russia) **Ekaterina Bobrova / Dmitri Soloviev**
26	(Japan) **Yuzuru Hanyu** (Russia) **Maxim Kovtun**	(Russia) **Anna Pogorilaya** (Russia) **Adelina Sotnikova**		(France) **Nathalie Pechalat / Fabian Bourzat** (Canada) **Kaitlyn Weaver / Andrew Poje** (Italy) **Anna Cappellini / Luca Lanotte**
24	(Japan) Daisuke Takahashi (withdrew) (China) **Yan Han** (Japan) **Nobunari Oda** (called up)	(Russia) **Elena Radionova** (Japan) Akiko Suzuki (Italy) Carolina Kostner	(Canada) **Kirsten Moore-Towers / Dylan Moscovitch** (Canada) **Meagan Duhamel / Eric Radford** (China) **Peng Cheng / Zhang Hao** (China) Sui Wenjing / Han Cong	
22	(United States) Adam Rippon		(Italy) Stefania Berton / Ondrej Hotarek (Russia) Vera Bazarova / Yuri Larionov	(Russia) Elena Ilinykh / Nikita Katsalapov (United States) Maia Shibutani / Alex Shibutani (United States) Madison Chock / Evan Bates
20		(United States) Gracie Gold	(Russia) Ksenia Stolbova / Fedor Klimov (United States) Caydee Denney / John Coughlin	(United States) Madison Hubbell / Zachary Donohue
19				
18	(United States) Jason Brown (Spain) Javier Fernández	(Russia) Elizaveta Tuktamysheva		(Russia) Ekaterina Riazanova / Ilia Tkachenko
17				
16	(Japan) Takahiko Kozuka (United States) Jeremy Abbott (Czech Republic) Michal Březina	(United States) Samantha Cesario		
15	(United States) Max Aaron			
14	(United States) Richard Dornbush	(United States) Mirai Nagasu (Japan) Satoko Miyahara	(United States) Marissa Castelli / Simon Shnapir (Canada) Paige Lawrence / Rudi Swiegers (United States) Haven Denney / Brandon Frazier	(Germany) Nelli Zhiganshina / Alexander Gazsi (France) Pernelle Carron / Lloyd Jones
13		(Japan) Kanako Murakami		
12	(Russia) Konstantin Menshov	(United States) Christina Gao (France) Mae Berenice Meite (Canada) Amelie Lacoste	(United States) Alexa Scimeca / Chris Knierim	(Russia) Ksenia Monko / Kirill Khaliavin (Canada) Piper Gilles / Paul Poirier (Japan) Cathy Reed / Chris Reed
11				
10		(Russia) Nikol Gosviani		
9	(Kazakhstan) Denis Ten (France) Florent Amodio	(Italy) Valentina Marchei (United States) Agnes Zawadzki	(China) Wang Xuehan / Wang Lei	
8	(Russia) Artur Gachinski (China) Song Nan (Germany) Peter Liebers			
7	(United States) Joshua Farris (Sweden) Alexander Majorov	(Sweden) Viktoria Helgesson	(Russia) Julia Antipova / Nodari Maisuradze (France) Vanessa James / Morgan Cipres	(Canada) Alexandra Paul / Mitchell Islam (France) Gabriella Papadakis / Guillaume Cizeron (United States) Alexandra Aldridge / Daniel Eaton
6				
5	(Japan) Takahito Mura	(Japan) Haruka Imai (United States) Courtney Hicks	(United States) Felicia Zhang / Nathan Bartholomay (United States) Lindsay Davis / Rockne Brubaker (Canada) Natasha Purich / Mervin Tran	(China) Yu Xiaoyang / Wang Chen
4	(Canada) Elladj Balde	(Ukraine) Natalia Popova (Russia) Alena Leonova		
3	(Canada) Andrei Rogozine (Uzbekistan) Misha Ge	(China) Zhang Kexin (Canada) Veronik Mallet		
0	(Russia) Sergei Voronov (United States) Ross Miner (China) Wang Yi	(Georgia (country)) Elene Gedevanishvili (China) Guo Xiaowen (China) Li Zijun (United States) Caroline Zhang	(Russia) Anastasia Martiusheva / Alexei Rogonov (Germany) Annabelle Prölß / Ruben Blommaert (Germany) Mari Vartmann / Aaron Van Cleave (Canada) Margaret Purdy / Michael Marinaro (Japan) Narumi Takahashi / Ryuichi Kihara (Italy) Nicole Della Monica / Matteo Guarise (France) Daria Popova / Bruno Massot	(Lithuania) Isabella Tobias / Deividas Stagniunas (Italy) Charlene Guignard / Marco Fabri (Germany) Tanja Kolbe / Stefano Caruso (China) Zhang Yiyi / Wu Nan (Azerbaijan) Julia Zlobina / Alexei Sitnikov (Russia) Alexandra Stepanova / Ivan Bukin (United Kingdom) Penny Coomes / Nicholas Buckland (Russia) Victoria Sinitsina / Ruslan Zhiganshin (Ukraine) Siobhan Heekin-Canedy / Dmitri Dun (Canada) Nicole Orford / Thomas Williams

== Medal standings ==
Rank	Nation	Gold	Silver	Bronze	Total
1	Japan (JPN)	7	4	4	15
2	Russia (RUS)	6	10	3	19
3	Canada (CAN)	4	6	2	12
4	United States (USA)	4	2	12	18
5	Germany (GER)	3	0	0	3
6	China (CHN)	2	3	3	8
7	Italy (ITA)	1	3	1	5
8	France (FRA)	1	0	2	3
9	Spain (ESP)	0	0	1	1
Totals (9 entries)		28	28	28	84
