= 2014–15 ISU Grand Prix of Figure Skating =

- Type: Grand Prix
- Date: October 24 – December 14, 2014
- Season: 2014–15
- Previous: 2013–14 Grand Prix
- Next: 2015–16 Grand Prix

The 2014–15 ISU Grand Prix of Figure Skating is a series of senior international figure skating competitions in the 2014–15 season. Medals were awarded in the disciplines of men's singles, ladies' singles, pair skating, and ice dancing. Skaters earned points based on their placement at each event and the top six in each discipline qualified to compete at the Grand Prix Final, held in Barcelona, Spain.

Organized by the International Skating Union, the Grand Prix series began in October 24 and ran until December 14, 2014. The series sets the stage for the 2015 European, Four Continents, and World Championships. The corresponding series for junior-level skaters were the 2014–15 ISU Junior Grand Prix.

== Schedule ==
The series comprised the following events:

Date	Event	Location
October 24–26	2014 Skate America	Hoffman Estates, Illinois, United States
Oct. 31 – Nov. 2	2014 Skate Canada International	Kelowna, British Columbia, Canada
November 7–9	2014 Cup of China	Shanghai, China
November 14–16	2014 Rostelecom Cup	Moscow, Russia
November 21–23	2014 Trophée Éric Bompard	Bordeaux, France
November 28–30	2014 NHK Trophy	Osaka, Japan
December 11–14	2014–15 Grand Prix Final	Barcelona, Spain

== Assignments ==
On June 28, the preliminary Grand Prix assignments were announced:

=== Men ===
Skater	Assignment(s)
2 Assignments
(Canada) Nam Nguyen	Skate America, Cup of China
(Canada) Jeremy Ten	Rostelecom Cup, NHK Trophy (added)
(China) Yan Han	Cup of China, Trophée Éric Bompard
(Czech Republic) Michal Březina	Skate Canada International, Rostelecom Cup
(France) Florent Amodio	Skate Canada International, Trophée Éric Bompard
(France) Chafik Besseghier	Skate America, Trophée Éric Bompard
(Israel) Alexei Bychenko	Skate America, Cup of China (added)
(Italy) Ivan Righini	Rostelecom Cup, NHK Trophy
(Japan) Yuzuru Hanyu	Cup of China, NHK Trophy
(Japan) Takahiko Kozuka	Skate Canada International, Rostelecom Cup
(Japan) Tatsuki Machida	Skate America, Trophée Éric Bompard
(Japan) Takahito Mura	Skate Canada International, NHK Trophy
(Kazakhstan) Denis Ten	Skate America, Trophée Éric Bompard
(South Korea) Kim Jin-seo	Cup of China (added), NHK Trophy
(Russia) Artur Gachinski	Skate America, Rostelecom Cup (added)
(Russia) Maxim Kovtun	Cup of China, Trophée Éric Bompard
(Russia) Konstantin Menshov	Skate Canada International, Trophée Éric Bompard
(Russia) Adian Pitkeev	Skate America, Trophée Éric Bompard
(Russia) Sergei Voronov	Rostelecom Cup, NHK Trophy
(Spain) Javier Fernández	Skate Canada International, Rostelecom Cup
(United States) Max Aaron	Skate Canada International, Rostelecom Cup
(United States) Jeremy Abbott	Skate America, NHK Trophy
(United States) Jason Brown	Skate America, Rostelecom Cup
(United States) Stephen Carriere	Skate Canada International (added), Rostelecom Cup
(United States) Richard Dornbush	Cup of China, Trophée Éric Bompard
(United States) Douglas Razzano	Skate America, Trophée Éric Bompard (added)
(United States) Adam Rippon	Skate Canada International, Trophée Éric Bompard
(Uzbekistan) Misha Ge	Cup of China, Rostelecom Cup (added)
1 Assignment
(Belgium) Jorik Hendrickx	Skate America, ~~NHK Trophy (added)~~
(Canada) Elladj Balde	~~Skate Canada International~~, NHK Trophy (added)
(Canada) Liam Firus	Skate Canada International
(Canada) Andrei Rogozine	Skate Canada International (added)
(China) Guan Yuhang	Cup of China (added)
(China) Wang Yi	Cup of China
(Japan) Daisuke Murakami	NHK Trophy (added)
(Japan) Keiji Tanaka	Cup of China
(Philippines) Michael Christian Martinez	Skate America
(Russia) Moris Kvitelashvili	Rostelecom Cup (added)
(United States) Joshua Farris	~~Cup of China,~~ NHK Trophy
(United States) Ross Miner	NHK Trophy
Removed
(Canada) Kevin Reynolds	~~Skate Canada International, NHK Trophy~~
(China) Guan Jinlin	~~Cup of China~~
(China) Song Nan	~~Cup of China, Trophée Éric Bompard~~
(France) Romain Ponsart	~~Trophée Éric Bompard (added)~~
(Germany) Peter Liebers	~~Cup of China, NHK Trophy~~
(Russia) Zhan Bush	~~Skate Canada International (added), Cup of China~~
(Russia) Mikhail Kolyada	~~Rostelecom Cup~~
(Sweden) Alexander Majorov	~~Skate Canada International, Rostelecom Cup~~

=== Ladies ===
Skater	Assignment(s)
2 Assignments
(Australia) Brooklee Han	Skate America, Skate Canada International (added)
(Canada) Alaine Chartrand	Skate Canada International (added), Rostelecom Cup
(Canada) Gabrielle Daleman	Cup of China, NHK Trophy
(Canada) Veronik Mallet	Skate Canada International, Trophée Éric Bompard (added)
(China) Li Zijun	Cup of China, NHK Trophy
(Czech Republic) Eliška Březinová	Rostelecom Cup (added), Trophée Éric Bompard
(France) Mae Berenice Meite	Skate America, Trophée Éric Bompard
(Georgia (country)) Elene Gedevanishvili	Skate America, NHK Trophy (added)
(Japan) Rika Hongo	Skate Canada International, Rostelecom Cup (added)
(Japan) Haruka Imai	Skate America, Trophée Éric Bompard
(Japan) Satoko Miyahara	Skate Canada International, NHK Trophy
(Japan) Kanako Murakami	Cup of China, NHK Trophy
(South Korea) Kim Hae-jin	Skate Canada International, Cup of China (added)
(South Korea) Park So-youn	Skate America, Rostelecom Cup
(Norway) Anne Line Gjersem	Cup of China, NHK Trophy (added)
(Russia) Maria Artemieva	Rostelecom Cup (added), Trophée Éric Bompard
(Russia) Alena Leonova	Skate Canada International, NHK Trophy
(Russia) Yulia Lipnitskaya	Cup of China, Trophée Éric Bompard
(Russia) Anna Pogorilaya	Skate Canada International, Rostelecom Cup
(Russia) Elena Radionova	Skate America, Trophée Éric Bompard
(Russia) Elizaveta Tuktamysheva	Skate America, Cup of China
(Switzerland) Anna Ovcharova	Trophée Éric Bompard, NHK Trophy
(Sweden) Viktoria Helgesson	Skate Canada International (added), Cup of China
(United States) Ashley Cain	Cup of China, Rostelecom Cup (added)
(United States) Samantha Cesario	Skate America (added), Trophée Éric Bompard
(United States) Polina Edmunds	Cup of China, NHK Trophy
(United States) Christina Gao	Cup of China, NhK Trophy
(United States) Gracie Gold	Skate America, NHK Trophy
(United States) Courtney Hicks	Skate Canada International, Trophée Éric Bompard
(United States) Mirai Nagasu	Skate America, Rostelecom Cup
(United States) Ashley Wagner	Skate Canada International, Trophée Éric Bompard
1 Assignment
(Canada) Julianne Séguin	Skate Canada International (added)
(France) Laurine Lecavelier	Trophée Éric Bompard
(Japan) Riona Kato	NHK Trophy (added)
(Japan) Miyabi Oba	Rostelecom Cup
(Russia) Maria Stavitskaya	Rostelecom Cup (added)
(Sweden) Joshi Helgesson	~~Skate America,~~ Rostelecom Cup
(Ukraine) Natalia Popova	Skate America
(United States) Angela Wang	Rostelecom Cup
Removed
(Canada) Kaetlyn Osmond	~~Skate Canada International, Trophée Éric Bompard~~
(China) Zhang Kexin	~~Cup of China~~
(France) Anais Ventard	~~Trophée Éric Bompard (added)~~
(Germany) Nathalie Weinzierl	~~Skate Canada International, Rostelecom Cup~~
(Italy) Valentina Marchei	~~Skate Canada International, Rostelecom Cup~~
(Russia) Nikol Gosviani	~~Rostelecom Cup (added), NHK Trophy~~
(Russia) Adelina Sotnikova	~~Rostelecom Cup, NHK Trophy~~
(United States) Vanessa Lam	~~Rostelecom Cup~~

=== Pairs ===
Pair	Assignment(s)
2 Assignments
(Austria) Miriam Ziegler / Severin Kiefer	Skate America, Trophée Éric Bompard (added)
(Canada) Meagan Duhamel / Eric Radford	Skate Canada International, NHK Trophy
(Canada) Kirsten Moore-Towers / Michael Marinaro	Skate Canada International, Trophée Éric Bompard
(China) Peng Cheng / Zhang Hao	Skate America, Cup of China
(China) Sui Wenjing / Han Cong	Skate Canada International, Trophée Éric Bompard
(China) Wang Xuehan / Wang Lei	Cup of China, Trophée Éric Bompard
(China) Yu Xiaoyu / Jin Yang	Cup of China, NHK Trophy
(France) Vanessa James / Morgan Cipres	Skate Canada International, Trophée Éric Bompard
(Germany) Annabelle Prolss / Ruben Blommaert	Skate America, Rostelecom Cup (added)
(Germany) Mari Vartmann / Aaron Van Cleave	Skate Canada International, NHK Trophy (added)
(Italy) Nicole Della Monica / Matteo Guarise	Cup of China, Trophée Éric Bompard (added)
(Japan) Narumi Takahashi / Ryuichi Kihara	Rostelecom Cup (added), NHK Trophy
(Russia) Vera Bazarova / Andrei Deputat	Cup of China, NHK Trophy
(Russia) Yuko Kavaguti / Alexander Smirnov	Skate America, NHK Trophy
(Russia) Ksenia Stolbova / Fedor Klimov	Trophée Éric Bompard, Rostelecom Cup
(Russia) Evgenia Tarasova / Vladimir Morozov	Skate Canada International, (added), Rostelecom Cup
(United States) Madeline Aaron / Max Settlage	Skate America, Skate Canada International (added)
(United States) Jessica Calalang / Zack Sidhu	Cup of China, Rostelecom Cup (added)
(United States) Haven Denney / Brandon Frazier	Skate America, Rostelecom Cup
(United States) DeeDee Leng / Simon Shnapir	Rostelecom Cup, NHK Trophy
(United States) Alexa Scimeca / Chris Knierim	Skate America, Trophée Éric Bompard
1 Assignment
(Canada) Vanessa Grenier / Maxime Deschamps	Skate America (added)
(Canada) Brittany Jones / Joshua Reagan	Skate Canada International
(Canada) Natasha Purich / Andrew Wolfe	Cup of China (added)
(Russia) Kristina Astakhova / Alexei Rogonov	Rostelecom Cup (added)
(Russia) Arina Cherniavskaia / Antonio Souza-Kordeyru	Cup of China, ~~NHK Trophy~~ (added)
Removed
(Germany) Maylin Wende / Daniel Wende	~~Skate America, Rostelecom Cup~~
(Italy) Stefania Berton / Ondrej Hotarek	~~Skate America, Rostelecom Cup~~
(Russia) Julia Antipova / Nodari Maisuradze	~~Cup of China, NHK Trophy~~
(Russia) Vasilisa Davankova / Alexander Enbert	~~Rostelecom Cup~~
(Russia) Tatiana Volosozhar / Maxim Trankov	~~Skate America, Cup of China~~
(Ukraine) Elizaveta Usmantseva / Roman Talan	~~Skate America (added)~~
(United States) Tarah Kayne / Daniel O'Shea	~~Cup of China, Rostelecom Cup~~
(United States) Felicia Zhang / Nathan Bartholomay	~~Skate Canada International, NHK Trophy~~

=== Ice dance ===
Team	Assignment(s)
2 Assignments
(Canada) Piper Gilles / Paul Poirier	Skate Canada International, Trophée Éric Bompard
(Canada) Élisabeth Paradis / François-Xavier Ouellette	Skate America (added), Skate Canada International
(Canada) Alexandra Paul / Mitchell Islam	Cup of China, Trophée Éric Bompard
(Canada) Kaitlyn Weaver / Andrew Poje	Skate Canada International, NHK Trophy
(France) Gabriella Papadakis / Guillaume Cizeron	Cup of China, Trophée Éric Bompard
(Germany) Nelli Zhiganshina / Alexander Gazsi	Skate Canada International, NHK Trophy
(United Kingdom) Penny Coomes / Nicholas Buckland	Rostelecom Cup, NHK Trophy
(Italy) Charlene Guignard / Marco Fabbri	Skate America, Trophée Éric Bompard (added)
(South Korea) Rebeka Kim / Kirill Minov	Rostelecom Cup, Trophée Éric Bompard (added)
(Russia) Elena Ilinykh / Ruslan Zhiganshin	Cup of China, Rostelecom Cup
(Russia) Ksenia Monko / Kirill Khaliavin	Skate Canada International, NHK Trophy
(Russia) Viktoria Sinitsina / Nikita Katsalapov	Rostelcom Cup, NHK Trophy
(Russia) Alexandra Stepanova / Ivan Bukin	Skate America (added), Rostelecom Cup
(Spain) Sara Hurtado / Adria Diaz	Skate Canada International, Trophée Éric Bompard
(United States) Alexandra Aldridge / Daniel Eaton	Skate Canada International, Rostelecom Cup
(United States) Madison Chock / Evan Bates	Skate America, Rostelecom Cup
(United States) Kaitlin Hawayek / Jean-Luc Baker	Rostelecom Cup, NHK Trophy
(United States) Madison Hubbell / Zachary Donohue	Skate Canada International, Trophée Éric Bompard
(United States) Maia Shibutani / Alex Shibutani	Skate America, Cup of China
1 Assignment
(Canada) Nicole Orford / Thomas Williams	Skate America
(China) Wang Shiyue / Liu Xinyu	Cup of China
(China) Zhang Yiyi / Wu Nan	Cup of China
(China) Zhao Yue / Zhang Xun	Cup of China (added)
(Italy) Anna Cappellini / Luca Lanotte	Cup of China, ~~Trophée Éric Bompard~~
(Japan) Emi Hirai / Marien de la Asuncion	NHK Trophy (added)
(Japan) Cathy Reed / Chris Reed	~~Skate America,~~ NHK Trophy
(Slovakia) Federica Testa / Lukas Csolley	Skate America (added)
(United States) Anastasia Cannuscio / Colin McManus	Skate America (added)
Removed
(Azerbaijan) Julia Zlobina / Alexei Sitnikov	~~Skate America, Rostelcom Cup~~
(Russia) Ekaterina Bobrova / Dmitri Soloviev	~~Skate America, Trophée Éric Bompard~~

=== Changes to preliminary assignments ===
==== Skate America ====
- On July 2, it was announced that Stefania Berton / Ondrej Hotarek had split up. On July 22, it was announced that their replacement was Elizaveta Usmantseva / Roman Talan.
- On July 10, Douglas Razzano and Anastasia Cannuscio / Colin McManus were added as host picks.
- On July 18, Samantha Cesario was added as a host pick.
- On August 13, Maylin Wende / Daniel Wende were removed from the roster due to an injury to Wende. On August 22, it was announced that Annabelle Prolss / Ruben Blommaert were their replacements.
- On September 2, Madeline Aaron / Max Settlage were announced as host picks.
- On September 19, Elizaveta Usmantseva / Roman Talan were removed from the roster. No reason has been given. On September 23, Miriam Ziegler / Severin Kiefer were announced as their replacements.
- On September 20, it was reported that Ekaterina Bobrova / Dmitri Soloviev were going to be withdrawing due to an injury to Soloviev. They were removed from the roster on September 29. On October 1, Alexandra Stepanova / Ivan Bukin were announced as their replacements.
- On September 22, it was reported that Tatiana Volosozhar / Maxim Trankov were going to be withdrawing due to an injury to Trankov. On October 1, they were removed from the roster. On October 3, Vanessa Grenier / Maxime Deschamps were announced as their replacements.
- On October 2, Julia Zlobina / Alexei Sitnikov withdrew. No reason has been given. On October 3, Federica Testa / Lukas Csolley were announced as their replacements.
- On October 10, Cathy Reed / Chris Reed were replaced on the roster by Élisabeth Paradis / François-Xavier Ouellette. No reason has been given.
- On October 17, Joshi Helgesson was removed from the roster due to an injury. She was not replaced.

==== Skate Canada International ====
- On July 10, Felicia Zhang / Nathan Bartholomay were removed from the roster. On July 15, it was announced that Madeline Aaron / Max Settlage had been named as replacements. It was revealed on July 16 that Zhang/Bartholomay had split up.
- On August 4, Alaine Chartrand was announced as a host pick.
- On September 8, Valentina Marchei was removed from the roster due to injury. On September 17, Viktoria Helgesson was announced as her replacement.
- On September 16, Kaetlyn Osmond withdrew to an injury. On September 17, she was replaced by Julianne Séguin.
- On September 23, Alexander Majorov was removed from the roster. No reason has been given. On October 1, Zhan Bush was announced as his replacement.
- On October 16, Zhan Bush was removed from the roster due to health problems. On October 21, Stephen Carriere was announced as his replacement.
- On October 17, Nathalie Weinzierl was removed from the roster. No reason has been given. On October 22, Brooklee Han was announced as her replacement.
- On October 27, Kevin Reynolds withdrew due to an injury. He was replaced by Andrei Rogozine.
- On October 29, Elladj Balde was removed from the roster due to a concussion. He was not replaced.

==== Cup of China ====
- On September 2, Zhao Yue / Zheng Xun were announced as host picks.
- On September 2, Peter Liebers was removed from the roster due to an injury. On September 9, Alexei Bychenko was announced as his replacement.
- On September 9, Kim Hae-jin was added to the roster, in place of a host pick.
- On September 29, Julia Antipova / Nodari Maisuradze were removed from the roster. No reason has been given. On October 1, they were removed from the roster. On October 9, Jessica Calalang / Zack Sidhu were announced as their replacements.
- On September 22, it was reported that Tatiana Volosozhar / Maxim Trankov were going to be withdrawing due to an injury to Trankov. On October 13, their replacement was announced as Arina Cherniavskaia / Antonin Souza-Kordyeru.
- On October 16, Zhan Bush was removed from the roster due to health problems. On October 21, Kim Jin-seo was announced as his replacement.
- On October 17, Tarah Kayne / Daniel O'Shea were removed from the roster due to lack of training time. On October 22, Natasha Purich / Andrew Wolfe were announced as their replacements. No replacement has since been announced.
- On October 24, Joshua Farris was removed from the roster. No reason has been given. He was not replaced.
- On October 29, Song Nan was removed from the roster. No reason has been given. He was replaced by Guan Yuhang.
- On November 3, Zhang Kexin was removed from the roster. No reason has been given. No replacement has been announced.

==== Rostelecom Cup ====
- On July 2, it was announced that Stefania Berton / Ondrej Hotarek had split up. On August 4, their replacement was announced as Annabelle Prolss / Ruben Blommaert.
- On July 10, Vanessa Lam was removed from the roster. No reason has been given. On July 15, it was announced that Ashley Cain had been named as her replacement.
- On August 13, Maylin Wende / Daniel Wende were removed from the roster due to an injury to Wende. On August 29, Narumi Takahashi / Ryuichi Kihara were named as their replacements.
- On August 29, Artur Gachinski, Nikol Gosviani, and Evgenia Tarasova / Vladmimir Morozov were chosen as host picks.
- On September 8, Valentina Marchei was removed from the roster due to injury. On September 17, Rika Hongo was announced as her replacement.
- On October 2, Julia Zlobina / Alexei Sitnikov withdrew. No reason was given. On October 7, Rebeka Kim / Kirill Minov were announced as their replacements.
- On October 14, Nikol Gosviani was replaced by Maria Artemieva. No reason has been given.
- On October 17, Tarah Kayne / Daniel O'Shea were removed from the roster due to lack of training time. On October 24, Jessica Calalang / Zack Sidhu were announced as their replacements.
- On October 28, Nathalie Weinzierl was removed from the roster due to an injury. On October 30, Eliška Březinová was announced as her replacement.
- On November 5, Alexander Majorov was removed from the roster. No reason has been given. On November 11, Misha Ge was announced as his replacement.
- On November 7, there were a few substitutions to the roster. Adelina Sotnikova and Mikhail Kolyada withdrew due to an injury. Vasilia Davankova / Alexander Enbert withdrew to due health problems. They were replaced by Maria Stavitskaya, Moris Kvitelashvili, and Kristina Astakhova / Alexei Rogonov respectively.

==== Trophée Éric Bompard ====
- On August 29, Romain Ponsart and Anais Ventard were chosen as host picks.
- On September 2, Rebeka Kim / Kirill Minov and Miriam Ziegler / Severin Kiefer were added to the roster, in place of host picks.
- On September 16, Kaetlyn Osmond withdrew due to an injury. On September 17, Veronik Mallet was announced as her replacement.
- On September 20, it was reported that Ekaterina Bobrova / Dmitri Soloviev were going to be withdrawing due to an injury to Soloviev. They were officially removed from the roster on October 13. On October 17, Charlene Guignard / Marco Fabbri were announced as their replacements.
- On November 5, Anais Ventard and Romain Ponsart withdrew from the competition. They were replaced by Anna Ovcharova and Douglas Razzano.
- On November 14, it was reported that Anna Cappellini / Luca Lanotte withdrew due to needing to make changes to their program. They were officially removed from the roster on November 17, and were not replaced.
- On November 13, Song Nan was removed from the roster. No reason has been given and he was not replaced.

==== NHK Trophy ====
- On July 10, Felicia Zhang / Nathan Bartholomay were removed from the roster. On July 15, it was announced that Mari Vartmann / Aaron van Cleave had been named as replacements. It was revealed on July 16 that Zhang/Bartholomay had split up.
- On August 12, it was announced that Daisuke Murakami, Riona Kato, and Emi Hirai / Marien de la Asuncion were added as host picks.
- On September 29, Julia Antipova / Nodari Maisuradze were removed from the roster. No reason has been given. On October 8, Arina Cherniavskaia / Antonio Souza-Kordeyru were announced as their replacements.
- On October 9, Guan Jinlin was removed from the roster. No reason has been given. On October 23, Jeremy Ten was announced as his replacement.
- On October 14, Nikol Gosviani was removed from the roster. No reason has been given. On October 30, Elene Gedevanishvili was announced as he replacement.
- On October 27, Kevin Reynolds withdrew due to an injury. On October 30, Jorik Hendrickx was announced as his replacement.
- On October 29, Peter Liebers was removed from the roster. No reason has been given. On November 11, Elladj Balde was announced as his replacement.
- On November 9, it was reported that Adelina Sotnikova withdrew due to a torn ankle ligament. She was officially removed from the roster on November 11. On November 17, Anne Line Gjersem was announced as her replacement.
- On November 24, Jorik Hendrickx and Arina Cherniavskaia / Antonio Souza-Kordeyru were removed from the roster. No replacements have been announced.

== Medal summary ==
Event	Discipline	Gold	Silver	Bronze
Skate America	Men	(Japan) Tatsuki Machida	(United States) Jason Brown	(Canada) Nam Nguyen
Skate America	Ladies	(Russia) Elena Radionova	(Russia) Elizaveta Tuktamysheva	(United States) Gracie Gold
Skate America	Pairs	(Russia) Yuko Kavaguti / Alexander Smirnov	(United States) Haven Denney / Brandon Frazier	(China) Peng Cheng / Zhang Hao
Skate America	Ice dancing	(United States) Madison Chock / Evan Bates	(United States) Maia Shibutani / Alex Shibutani	(Russia) Alexandra Stepanova / Ivan Bukin

Event	Discipline	Gold	Silver	Bronze
Skate Canada	Men	(Japan) Takahito Mura	(Spain) Javier Fernández	(United States) Max Aaron
Skate Canada	Ladies	(Russia) Anna Pogorilaya	(United States) Ashley Wagner	(Japan) Satoko Miyahara
Skate Canada	Pairs	(Canada) Meagan Duhamel / Eric Radford	(China) Sui Wenjing / Han Cong	(Russia) Evgenia Tarasova / Vladimir Morozov
Skate Canada	Ice dancing	(Canada) Kaitlyn Weaver / Andrew Poje	(Canada) Piper Gilles / Paul Poirier	(United States) Madison Hubbell / Zachary Donohue

Event	Discipline	Gold	Silver	Bronze
Cup of China	Men	(Russia) Maxim Kovtun	(Japan) Yuzuru Hanyu	(United States) Richard Dornbush
Cup of China	Ladies	(Russia) Elizaveta Tuktamysheva	(Russia) Yulia Lipnitskaya	(Japan) Kanako Murakami
Cup of China	Pairs	(China) Peng Cheng / Zhang Hao	(China) Yu Xiaoyu / Jin Yang	(China) Wang Xuehan / Wang Lei
Cup of China	Ice dancing	(France) Gabriella Papadakis / Guillaume Cizeron	(United States) Maia Shibutani / Alex Shibutani	(Italy) Anna Cappellini / Luca Lanotte

Event	Discipline	Gold	Silver	Bronze
Rostelecom Cup	Men	(Spain) Javier Fernández	(Russia) Sergei Voronov	(Czech Republic) Michal Březina
Rostelecom Cup	Ladies	(Japan) Rika Hongo	(Russia) Anna Pogorilaya	(Canada) Alaine Chartrand
Rostelecom Cup	Pairs	(Russia) Ksenia Stolbova / Fedor Klimov	(Russia) Evgenia Tarasova / Vladimir Morozov	(Russia) Kristina Astakhova / Alexei Rogonov
Rostelecom Cup	Ice dancing	(United States) Madison Chock / Evan Bates	(Russia) Elena Ilinykh / Ruslan Zhiganshin	(United Kingdom) Penny Coomes / Nicholas Buckland

Event	Discipline	Gold	Silver	Bronze
Trophée Éric Bompard	Men	(Russia) Maxim Kovtun	(Japan) Tatsuki Machida	(Kazakhstan) Denis Ten
Trophée Éric Bompard	Ladies	(Russia) Elena Radionova	(Russia) Yulia Lipnitskaya	(United States) Ashley Wagner
Trophée Éric Bompard	Pairs	(Russia) Ksenia Stolbova / Fedor Klimov	(China) Sui Wenjing / Han Cong	(China) Wang Xuehan / Wang Lei
Trophée Éric Bompard	Ice dancing	(France) Gabriella Papadakis / Guillaume Cizeron	(Canada) Piper Gilles / Paul Poirier	(United States) Madison Hubbell / Zachary Donohue

Event	Discipline	Gold	Silver	Bronze
NHK Trophy	Men	(Japan) Daisuke Murakami	(Russia) Sergei Voronov	(Japan) Takahito Mura
NHK Trophy	Ladies	(United States) Gracie Gold	(Russia) Alena Leonova	(Japan) Satoko Miyahara
NHK Trophy	Pairs	(Canada) Meagan Duhamel / Eric Radford	(Russia) Yuko Kavaguti / Alexander Smirnov	(China) Yu Xiaoyu / Jin Yang
NHK Trophy	Ice dancing	(Canada) Kaitlyn Weaver / Andrew Poje	(Russia) Ksenia Monko / Kirill Khaliavin	(United States) Kaitlin Hawayek / Jean-Luc Baker

Event	Discipline	Gold	Silver	Bronze
Grand Prix Final	Men	(Japan) Yuzuru Hanyu	(Spain) Javier Fernández	(Russia) Sergei Voronov
Grand Prix Final	Ladies	(Russia) Elizaveta Tuktamysheva	(Russia) Elena Radionova	(United States) Ashley Wagner
Grand Prix Final	Pairs	(Canada) Meagan Duhamel / Eric Radford	(Russia) Ksenia Stolbova / Fedor Klimov	(China) Sui Wenjing / Han Cong
Grand Prix Final	Ice dancing	(Canada) Kaitlyn Weaver / Andrew Poje	(United States) Madison Chock / Evan Bates	(France) Gabriella Papadakis/ Guillaume Cizeron

== Medal standings ==
Rank	Nation	Gold	Silver	Bronze	Total
1	Russia (RUS)	10	13	4	27
2	Canada (CAN)	6	2	2	10
3	Japan (JPN)	5	2	4	11
4	United States (USA)	3	6	8	17
5	France (FRA)	2	0	1	3
6	China (CHN)	1	3	5	9
7	Spain (ESP)	1	2	0	3
8	Czech Republic (CZE)	0	0	1	1
8	Great Britain (GBR)	0	0	1	1
8	Italy (ITA)	0	0	1	1
8	Kazakhstan (KAZ)	0	0	1	1
Totals (11 entries)		28	28	28	84

== Qualification ==
At each event, skaters earned points toward qualification for the Grand Prix Final. Following the sixth event, the top six highest scoring skaters/teams advanced to the Final. The points earned per placement were as follows:

Placement	Points (Singles)	Points (Pairs/Dance)
1st	15	15
2nd	13	13
3rd	11	11
4th	9	9
5th	7	7
6th	5	5
7th	4	-
8th	3	-
9th	-	–
10th	-	–

There were seven tie-breakers in cases of a tie in overall points:

1. Highest placement at an event. If a skater placed 1st and 3rd, the tiebreaker is the 1st place, and that beats a skater who placed 2nd in both events.
2. Highest combined total scores in both events. If a skater earned 200 points at one event and 250 at a second, that skater would win in the second tie-break over a skater who earned 200 points at one event and 150 at another.
3. Participated in two events.
4. Highest combined scores in the free skating/free dancing portion of both events.
5. Highest individual score in the free skating/free dancing portion from one event.
6. Highest combined scores in the short program/short dance of both events.
7. Highest number of total participants at the events.

If a tie remained, it was considered unbreakable and the tied skaters all advanced to the Grand Prix Final.

=== Qualification standings ===
Bold denotes Grand Prix Final qualification.

Points	Men	Ladies	Pairs	Ice dance
30	(Russia) **Maxim Kovtun**	(Russia) **Elena Radionova**	(Russia) **Ksenia Stolbova / Fedor Klimov** (Canada) **Meagan Duhamel / Eric Radford**	(United States) **Madison Chock / Evan Bates** (Canada) **Kaitlyn Weaver / Andrew Poje** (France) **Gabriella Papadakis / Guillaume Cizeron**
28	(Spain) **Javier Fernández** (Japan) **Tatsuki Machida**	(Russia) **Elizaveta Tuktamysheva** **(Russia) Anna Pogorilaya**	(Russia) **Yuko Kavaguti / Alexander Smirnov**	
26	(Japan) **Takahito Mura** (Russia) **Sergei Voronov**	(United States) Gracie Gold (withdrew) (Russia) **Yulia Lipnitskaya**	(China) **Peng Cheng / Zhang Hao** (China) **Sui Wenjing / Han Cong**	(United States) **Maia Shibutani / Alex Shibutani** (Canada) **Piper Gilles / Paul Poirier**
24		(United States) **Ashley Wagner**	(China) **Yu Xiaoyu / Jin Yang** (Russia) Evgenia Tarasova / Vladimir Morozov	
22	(Japan) **Yuzuru Hanyu**	(Japan) **Rika Hongo** (called up) (Japan) Satoko Miyahara	(United States) Haven Denney / Brandon Frazier (China) Wang Xuehan / Wang Lei	(Russia) **Elena Ilinykh / Ruslan Zhiganshin** (Russia) Ksenia Monko / Kirill Khaliavin (United States) Madison Hubbell / Zachary Donohue
20	(United States) Jason Brown (Kazakhstan) Denis Ten (Canada) Nam Nguyen	(Japan) Kanako Murakami		
19				
18		(Russia) Alena Leonova (United States) Courtney Hicks	(United States) Alexa Scimeca / Chris Knierim (Russia) Vera Bazarova / Andrei Deputat	(United Kingdom) Penny Coomes / Nicholas Buckland (Russia) Alexandra Stepanova / Ivan Bukin
17				
16	(Russia) Konstantin Menshov (Uzbekistan) Misha Ge		(United States) Madeline Aaron / Max Settlage	(United States) Kaitlin Hawayek / Jean-Luc Baker (Germany) Nelli Zhiganshina / Alexander Gazsi
15	(Japan) Daisuke Murakami (Czech Republic) Michal Březina (United States) Richard Dornbush (United States) Max Aaron	(Canada) Alaine Chartrand		
14	(United States) Jeremy Abbott	(United States) Mirai Nagasu (South Korea) Park So-youn	(France) Vanessa James / Morgan Cipres	
13		(United States) Samantha Cesario		
12		(United States) Polina Edmunds (Canada) Gabrielle Daleman	(Italy) Nicole Della Monica / Matteo Guarise	(Canada) Alexandra Paul / Mitchell Islam (Italy) Charlene Guignard / Marco Fabbri
11			(Russia) Kristina Astakhova / Alexei Rogonov	(Italy) Anna Cappellini / Luca Lanotte
10	(Russia) Adian Pitkeev			
9	(United States) Stephen Carriere	(China) Li Zijun		(Spain) Sara Hurtado / Adria Diaz (Canada) Elisabeth Paradis / Francois Xavier Ouelette (Russia) Victoria Sinitsina / Nikita Katsalapov
8	(China) Yan Han (Japan) Takahiko Kozuka			
7	(United States) Adam Rippon	(France) Maé-Bérénice Méité (Japan) Riona Kato	(United States) Jessica Calalang / Zack Sidhu (Germany) Mari Vartmann / Aaron Van Cleave	(United States) Anastasia Cannuscio / Colin McManus
6		(Japan) Haruka Imai		
5	(France) Florent Amodio	(Russia) Maria Artemieva (Japan) Miyabi Oba	(Canada) Kirsten Moore-Towers / Michael Marinaro (Germany) Annabelle Prolss / Ruben Blommaert (United States) DeeDee Leng / Simon Shnapir (Canada) Natasha Purich / Andrew Wolfe (Canada) Vanessa Grenier / Maxime Deschamps	(United States) Alexandra Aldridge / Daniel Eaton (Japan) Cathy Reed / Chris Reed (China) Wang Shiyue / Lin Xinyu
4	(France) Chafik Besseghier (Israel) Alexei Bychenko (United States) Ross Miner	(Georgia (country)) Elene Gedevanishvili (Sweden) Viktoria Helgesson (Russia) Maria Stavitskaia		
3	(Canada) Jeremy Ten (Russia) Artur Gachinski (United States) Douglas Razzano (Japan) Keiji Tanaka	(Australia) Brooklee Han (South Korea) Kim Hae-jin (United States) Ashley Cain		
0	(South Korea) Kim Jin-seo (Canada) Andrei Rogozine (Italy) Ivan Righini (Philippines) Michael Christian Martinez (China) Guan Yuhang (Canada) Liam Firus (United States) Joshua Farris (China) Wang Yi (Belgium) Jorik Hendrickx (Russia) Moris Kvitelashvili	(Czech Republic) Eliška Březinová (United States) Christina Gao (United States) Angela Wang (Canada) Veronik Mallet (Switzerland) Anna Ovcharova (Norway) Anne Line Gjersem (Ukraine) Natalia Popova (France) Laurine Lecavelier (Canada) Julianne Séguin	(Japan) Narumi Takahashi / Ryuichi Kihara (Canada) Brittany Jones / Joshua Reagan (Austria) Miriam Ziegler / Severin Kiefer (Russia) Arina Cherniavskaia / Antonio Souza-Kordeyru	(South Korea) Rebeka Kim / Kirill Minov (Slovakia) Federica Testa / Lukas Csolley (China) Zhang Yiyi / Wu Nan (Canada) Nicole Orford / Thomas Williams (Japan) Emi Hirai / Marien de la Asuncion (China) Zhao Yue / Zheng Xun
