= 2013 Cup of China =

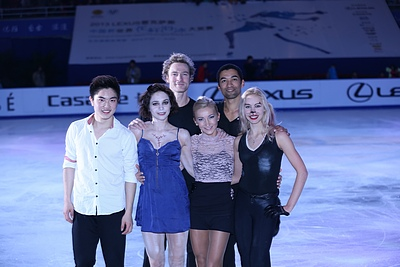
- Type: Grand Prix
- Date: November 1 – 3
- Season: 2013–14
- Location: Beijing
- Host: Chinese Skating Association
- Venue: Capital Indoor Stadium

Champions
- Men's singles: (China) Yan Han
- Ladies' singles: (Russia) Anna Pogorilaya
- Pairs: (Germany) Aliona Savchenko / Robin Szolkowy
- Ice dance: (France) Nathalie Péchalat / Fabian Bourzat
- Previous: 2012 Cup of China
- Next: 2014 Cup of China
- Previous Grand Prix: 2013 Skate Canada International
- Next Grand Prix: 2013 NHK Trophy

The 2013 Cup of China was the third event of six in the 2013–14 ISU Grand Prix of Figure Skating, a senior-level international invitational competition series. It was held at the Capital Indoor Stadium in Beijing on November 1–3. Medals were awarded in the disciplines of men's singles, ladies' singles, pair skating, and ice dancing. Skaters earned points toward qualifying for the 2013–14 Grand Prix Final.

== Entries ==
Country	Men	Ladies	Pairs	Ice dancing
China	Song Nan; Wang Yi; Yan Han	Guo Xiaowen; Li Zijun; Zhang Kexin	Pang Qing / Tong Jian; Peng Cheng / Zhang Hao; Wang Xuehan / Wang Lei	Huang Xintong / Zheng Xun; Yu Xiaoyang / Wang Chen; Zhang Yiyi / Wu Nan
France	Florent Amodio		Daria Popova / Bruno Massot	Pernelle Carron / Lloyd Jones; Nathalie Péchalat / Fabian Bourzat
Germany	Peter Liebers		Aliona Savchenko / Robin Szolkowy	
Italy		Carolina Kostner		
Japan	Takahiko Kozuka	Haruka Imai; Kanako Murakami		
Kazakhstan	Denis Ten			
Russia	Maxim Kovtun	Nikol Gosviani; Anna Pogorilaya; Adelina Sotnikova	Anastasia Martiusheva / Alexei Rogonov	Ekaterina Bobrova / Dmitri Soloviev
United States	Richard Dornbush	Agnes Zawadzki	Alexa Scimeca / Chris Knierim; Felicia Zhang / Nathan Bartholomay	Alexandra Aldridge / Daniel Eaton; Madison Chock / Evan Bates

=== Changes to preliminary assignments ===
Polina Korobeynikova withdrew and was replaced by Nikol Gosviani. Geng Bingwa withdrew and was replaced by Guo Xiaowen. Kevin Reynolds also withdrew; he was not replaced.

== Results ==
=== Men ===
Rank	Name	Nation	Total points	SP		FS	
1	Yan Han	China	245.62	1	90.14	2	155.48
2	Maxim Kovtun	Russia	238.65	2	81.84	1	156.81
3	Takahiko Kozuka	Japan	226.92	3	81.62	5	145.30
4	Denis Ten	Kazakhstan	224.80	4	77.05	3	147.75
5	Richard Dornbush	United States	218.57	6	72.58	4	145.99
6	Florent Amodio	France	213.39	5	76.75	6	136.64
7	Peter Liebers	Germany	200.80	7	69.34	7	131.46
8	Song Nan	China	196.80	8	68.68	8	128.12
9	Wang Yi	China	185.22	9	63.27	9	121.95

=== Ladies ===
Rank	Name	Nation	Total points	SP		FS	
1	Anna Pogorilaya	Russia	178.62	3	60.24	1	118.38
2	Adelina Sotnikova	Russia	174.70	1	66.03	3	108.67
3	Carolina Kostner	Italy	173.40	2	62.75	2	110.65
4	Kanako Murakami	Japan	165.95	4	57.33	4	108.62
5	Nikol Gosviani	Russia	152.04	6	53.76	5	98.28
6	Haruka Imai	Japan	150.30	5	54.79	6	95.51
7	Agnes Zawadzki	United States	147.64	7	53.73	8	93.91
8	Zhang Kexin	China	144.88	9	53.32	9	91.56
9	Guo Xiaowen	China	139.50	10	45.32	7	94.18
10	Li Zijun	China	138.98	8	53.58	10	85.40

=== Pairs ===
Rank	Name	Nation	Total points	SP		FS	
1	Aliona Savchenko / Robin Szolkowy	Germany	201.21	2	69.07	1	132.14
2	Pang Qing / Tong Jian	China	194.38	1	70.38	2	124.00
3	Peng Cheng / Zhang Hao	China	187.19	3	64.24	3	122.95
4	Wang Xuehan / Wang Lei	China	172.35	5	57.16	4	115.19
5	Alexa Scimeca / Chris Knierim	United States	161.72	4	57.99	6	103.73
6	Felicia Zhang / Nathan Bartholomay	United States	155.52	8	50.33	5	105.19
7	Anastasia Martiusheva / Alexei Rogonov	Russia	147.19	6	53.02	7	94.17
8	Daria Popova / Bruno Massot	France	141.33	7	51.82	8	89.51

=== Ice dancing ===
Rank	Name	Nation	Total points	SD		FD	
1	Nathalie Péchalat / Fabian Bourzat	France	165.68	2	63.60	1	102.08
2	Ekaterina Bobrova / Dmitri Soloviev	Russia	163.42	1	65.70	2	97.72
3	Madison Chock / Evan Bates	United States	150.53	3	56.77	3	93.76
4	Pernelle Carron / Lloyd Jones	France	134.12	5	50.20	4	83.92
5	Alexandra Aldridge / Daniel Eaton	United States	132.06	4	52.92	5	79.14
6	Yu Xiaoyang / Wang Chen	China	106.18	7	41.24	6	64.94
7	Zhang Yiyi / Wu Nan	China	104.98	6	41.79	7	63.19
WD	Huang Xintong / Zheng Xun	China		WD			
