= Guo Xiaowen =

Chinese figure skater (born 1997)

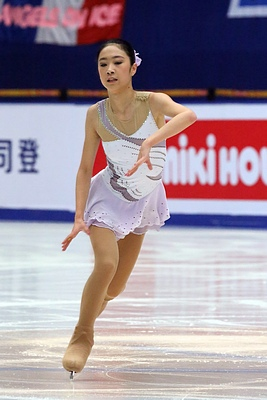
- Guo at the 2013 Cup of China

Personal information
- Born: July 22, 1997 (age 28) Changchun, China
- Height: 1.64 m (5 ft 4 1/2 in)

Figure skating career
- Country: China
- Coach: Liu Yazhou
- Began skating: 2003

Guo Xiaowen (Chinese: 郭小雯; pinyin: Guō Xiǎowén; July 22, 1997) is a Chinese figure skater. She competed in the final segment at the 2013 World Junior Championships in Milan and at one Grand Prix event, the 2013 Cup of China.

== Programs ==
Season	Short program	Free skating	Exhibition
2014–2015	Howl's Moving Castle by Joe Hisaishi	Miss Saigon by Claude-Michel Schönberg	
2013–2014	Howl's Moving Castle by Joe Hisaishi	Don Juan DeMarco by Michael Kamen	Moonrise
2012–2013	Howl's Moving Castle by Joe Hisaishi	Grenada	
2011–2012	Over the Rainbow (from The Wizard of Oz) by Harold Arlen	Grenada	

== Competitive highlights ==
GP: Grand Prix; JGP: Junior Grand Prix

International
Event	2011–12	2012–13	2013–14	2014–15
GP Cup of China			9th	
International: Junior
World Junior Championships		22nd		
JGP Slovenia		8th		
National
Chinese Championships	7th	4th	5th	12th
