= Denis Ten =

Kazakh figure skater (1993–2018)

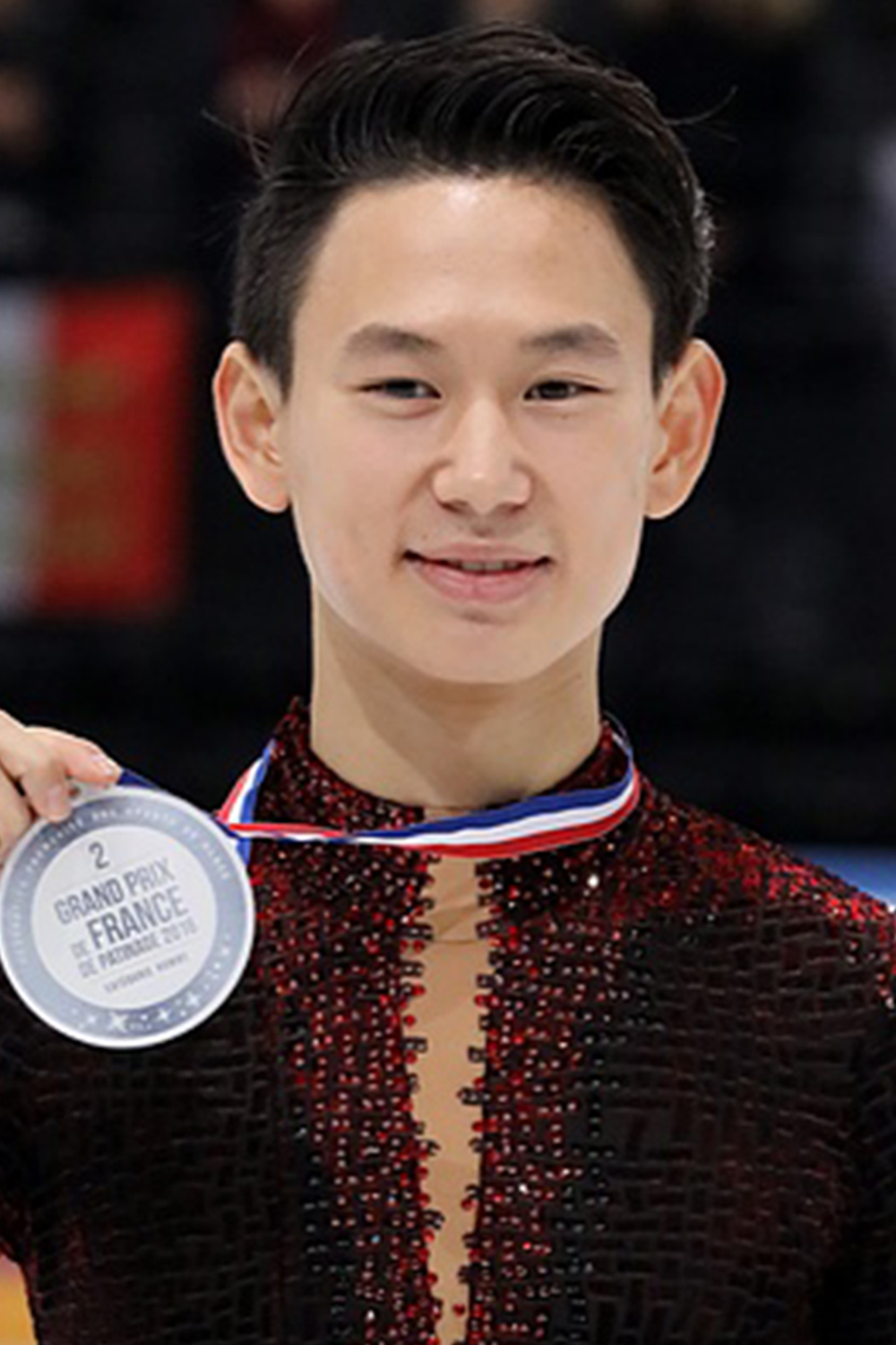
- Ten at the 2016 Grand Prix de France award ceremony

Personal information
- Full name: Denis Yurievich Ten
- Born: 13 June 1993 Almaty, Kazakhstan
- Died: 19 July 2018 (aged 25) Almaty, Kazakhstan
- Height: 1.68 m (5 ft 6 in)

Figure skating career
- Country: Kazakhstan
- Began skating: 1998

Medal record
Olympic Games
Bronze medal – third place	2014 Sochi	Singles
World Championships
Silver medal – second place	2013 London	Singles
Bronze medal – third place	2015 Shanghai	Singles
Four Continents Championships
Gold medal – first place	2015 Seoul	Singles

Denis Yurievich Ten (Russian: Денис Юрьевич Тен; 13 June 1993 – 19 July 2018) was a Kazakhstani figure skater. He was the 2014 Olympic bronze medalist, a two-time World medalist (silver in 2013, bronze in 2015), the 2015 Four Continents champion, and the 2017 Winter Universiade champion.

Ten was the first skater from Kazakhstan to stand on the podium at the World Championships, Four Continents Championships, Asian Winter Games, and the Olympic Games. At the 2008–09 ISU Junior Grand Prix event in Belarus, he became the first skater from Kazakhstan to win an International Skating Union competition. His other accomplishments include qualifying two spots for his country in the men's event at the 2010 and 2014 Winter Olympics.

Ten was the official ambassador for the Olympic Bidding Committee "Almaty 2022". He was a member of the Astana Presidential Sports Club and the political party "Nur Otan", which ruled the country since 1991. In 2013, he began producing his own ice show, "Denis Ten and Friends".

In July 2018, Ten was murdered in Almaty by two robbers who were attempting to steal his car mirrors.

== Early life ==
Ten was born on 13 June 1993 in Almaty, Kazakhstan. He was a member of the Korean minority in Kazakhstan. His great-great-grandfather, Min Geung-ho, was a Korean independence fighter general during the time of the Korean Empire when Korea fought for independence from Japan.

Ten attended music school for five years and competed as part of a choir. In 2002, his team won the silver medal at the World Choir Games, held in Busan, South Korea. This was Ten's first trip to that country. He also tried taekwondo, karate, tennis, swimming and acrobatics.

Ten moved with his mother to Moscow, Russia, in 2004 while his father and older brother, Alexei, remained in Kazakhstan. In 2010, he moved with his mother to the U.S. state of California.

== Career ==
=== Early career ===
Ten began skating at an open-air rink in Almaty in winter and later practiced at an indoor rink in a shopping mall. In 2003, he traveled to Omsk in southwest Siberia, Russia, for a skating competition which he won. The head judge, Alexander Kogan, invited him to another competition in Odintsovo, Moscow region, where Ten met coach Elena Buianova (Vodorezova). Ten began training camp with her at CSKA Moscow and was later invited to join her group full-time.

=== 2006–2007 season ===
Ten began competing internationally in the 2006–2007 season at the age of 13, which was the first year he was age-eligible for International Skating Union (ISU) junior-level competition. On 5 October 2006, he debuted on the ISU Junior Grand Prix (JGP) at the 2006–07 JGP event in The Hague, Netherlands. Ten placed 14th in the short program and 7th in the free skate to place 10th overall. In November, he competed at the 2006 Coupe Internationale de Nice in Nice, France, on the novice level. He won the event by 4.18 ahead of silver medalist Artur Gachinski.

In February 2007, Ten competed at the Dragon Trophy in Ljubljana, Slovenia. He won the junior men's event by 34.36 points over silver medalist Jason Thompson. Later that month, Ten competed at the 2007 World Junior Championships in Oberstdorf, Germany. He placed 26th in the short program and did not advance to the free skating portion of the event. He had placed 0.44 points below the final qualifier. Ten finished the season at the Haabersti Cup in Tallinn, Estonia, where he won the junior men's event by 16.34 points ahead of silver medalist Viktor Romanenkov.

=== 2007–2008 season ===
Ten began his season on the 2007–08 JGP circuit. In September 2007, he competed at the JGP event in Miercurea Ciuc, Romania. He placed 3rd in the short program, 2.42 behind second-place finisher Ivan Bariev and 2.22 ahead of fourth-place finisher Andrew Lum. In the free skate, Ten placed 6th, and finished the event in 6th place overall, 5.09 points behind bronze medalist Takahito Mura. At Ten's second event two weeks later in Tallinn, he placed 10th in the short program and 10th in the free skate to place 10th overall. He finished the ISU Junior Grand Prix in 31st place to qualify for the Junior Grand Prix Final.

In November, Ten competed at the NRW Trophy on the junior level. He won both segments of the competition to win the gold medal by 22.59 points over silver medalist Gordei Gorshkov.

In February 2008, Ten competed at the 2008 World Junior Championships. He placed 8th in the short program, 3.36 points behind third-place finisher Brandon Mroz and 9.35 points behind first-place finisher Adam Rippon. In the short program, Ten was credited with a triple Lutz–triple toe loop combination and received a level 4 on his change foot combination spin. In the free skate, Ten placed 19th after falling twice, once on a triple Axel attempt, and the second time on his triple Lutz. However, he was credited with rotating the triple Axel. He placed 16th overall. Because of his placement at the World Junior Championships, Ten earned Kazakhstan the right to send one men's entry to every JGP event for the following season.

=== 2008–2009 season ===
Ten began his season competing in the 2008–09 JGP. At his first event in Courchevel, France, he placed 5th in the short program and in the free skate to place 4th overall, placing 7.82 behind bronze medalist Florent Amodio. In his free skate, Ten landed a clean triple Axel. By placing 4th in his first event, Ten entered into contention to potentially qualify for the Junior Grand Prix Final. A month later, Ten competed at his second JGP event, the event in Gomel, Belarus. In the short program, Ten landed four triples, including a triple Axel, to win the short program by a 5.19 point margin of victory over second-place finisher Stanislav Kovalev. In the free skate, Ten landed six triple jumps to place 2nd in that segment of the competition by 3.88 points behind Yang Chao. Ten won the competition by 4.60 total points ahead of silver medalist Yang. By winning this competition, Ten simultaneously became the first skater from Kazakhstan to medal at an ISU competition and to win an ISU competition. Following the eighth and final Junior Grand Prix event, Ten became the first skater from Kazakhstan to qualify for the ISU Junior Grand Prix Final, for which he was the seventh qualifier.

Ten mentioned in interviews that he had landed the quad jump at the end of 2008, but an injury forced him to scale down training of the jump.

Ten competed at the 2008–09 JGP Final in Seoul, South Korea, in December 2008. In the short program, he landed a triple Axel, but fell on his combination jump and did not complete the combination to place 7th in that segment of the competition. In the free skating segment, Ten landed a triple Axel-double toe loop combination and six other triple jumps to place 3rd in that segment of the competition. He placed 5th overall, 0.31 points behind 4th-place finisher Ivan Bariev, and 3.59 points behind bronze medalist Richard Dornbush.

In February 2009, Ten made his senior international debut at the 2009 Four Continents in Vancouver, British Columbia, Canada, at the age of 15, the first year for which he was age-eligible for senior ISU championships. He placed 10th in the short program after landing a triple Axel and a triple Lutz, but missing his triple flip combination. He placed 8th in the free skate after landing six triples, including a triple Axel-triple toe loop combination, but popping a solo triple Axel and a triple flip. He placed 9th overall.

Two weeks later, Ten competed at the 2009 Junior Worlds. He placed 5th in the short program after being downgraded on the second jump in his triple-triple combination. In the free skate, Ten was credited with six triple jumps, including two triple Axels, and received another downgrade on the second jump of his triple-triple combination. He placed 4th in that segment of the competition, placing 0.32 points behind third-place finisher Artem Grigoriev in that segment of the competition. Ten placed 4th overall, ending the competition 0.63 points behind bronze medalist Grigoriev.

Ten finished the season at the 2009 World Championships, where he was the youngest male skater at the competition. He placed 17th in the short program after being credited with four triples, including his triple Axel and triple-triple combination. In the free skate, Ten was credited with eight triple jumps, the maximum number of triple jumps allowed, to place 6th in that segment of the competition. He placed 8th overall and qualified two spots for Kazakhstan at the Olympics for the first time in his sporting event's history.

=== 2009–2010 season ===
Ten won the 2009 Golden Spin of Zagreb and placed fourth overall in the 2009 NRW Trophy. After he made his Senior debut in the 2009–10 Grand Prix series, where he was assigned to the 2009 Cup of China and the 2009 Skate Canada International. He placed tenth at the 2009 Cup of China with 182.63 points, and seventh at the 2009 Skate Canada scoring 193.33 overall.

At the 2010 Four Continents, he earned 70.50 points in the short program, where he placed fourth. He came in fourteenth position in the free skate scoring 102.15 after falling on two of his jumps. He finished tenth with a combined score of 172.65 points.

At the 2010 Winter Olympics, Ten received a score of 76.24 points in the short program, placing tenth. He was fourteenth in the free skate with 135.01 points to finish eleventh overall with a total score of 211.25.

At the 2010 World Championships, Ten was in ninth place after the short program and placed fifteenth in the free skate with a score of 125.06 points. He finished 13th with 202.46 points overall. Following the World Championship, he announced a coaching change to Frank Carroll and relocated with his mother to California. Ten also worked with Rafael Arutyunyan.

=== 2010–2011 season ===
During the 2010–11 Grand Prix season, Ten competed at the 2010 NHK Trophy and the 2010 Skate America. At NHK, he placed 6th in the short program, but his long program saw him fall to 12th overall. At Skate America, he also placed sixth in the short program but dropped to 11th overall after the long program.

Ten won the gold medal at the 2011 Asian Winter Games with a first place in the short program and third in the long.

=== 2011–2012 season ===
Ten was assigned to 2011 Skate America and 2011 Skate Canada International. He placed 5th in both events. At the 2012 Worlds in Nice, France, Ten finished 7th, his best result at a World Championships until this season.

=== 2012–2013 season ===
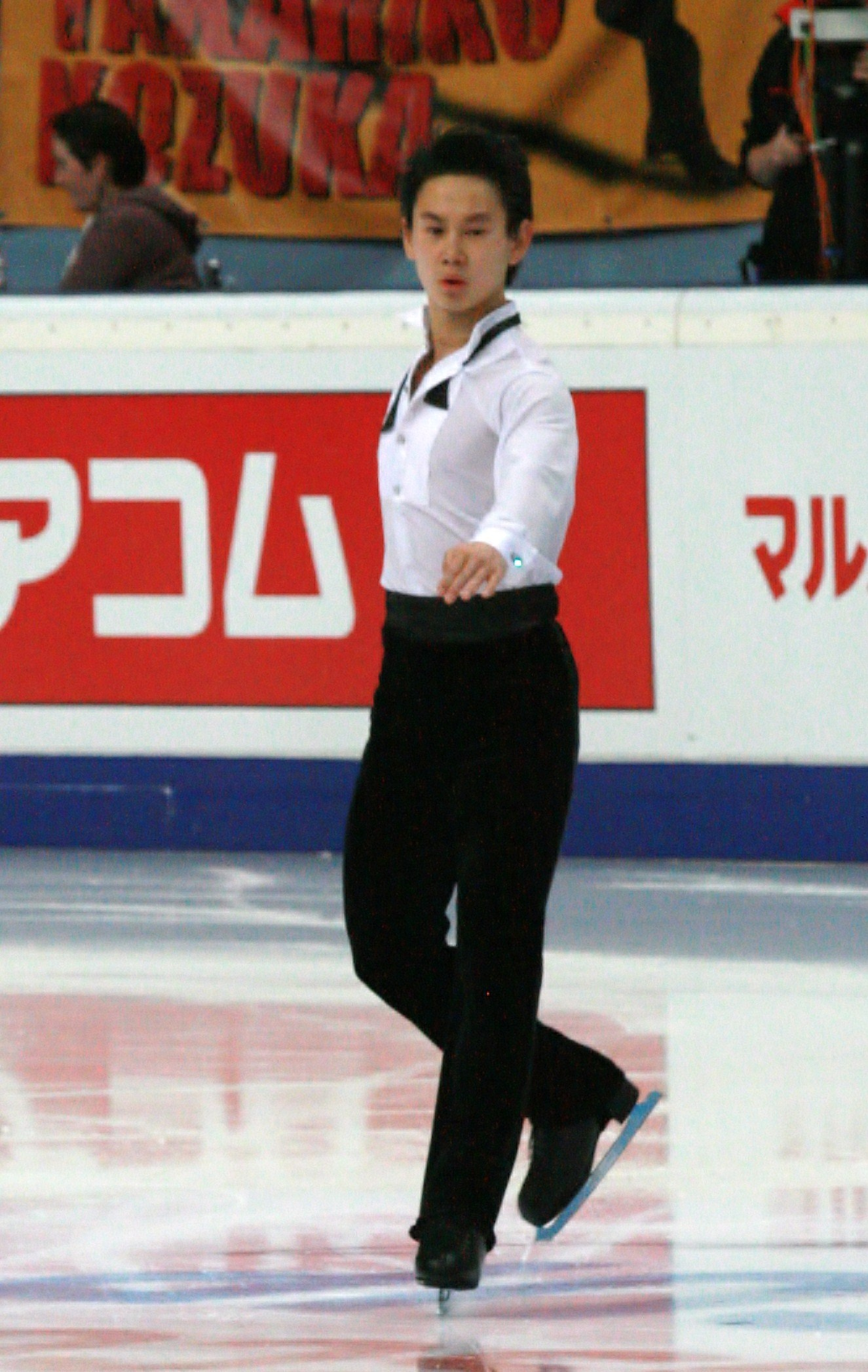
Ten at the 2012 Rostelecom Cup

Ten placed 6th at 2012 Skate Canada International, 9th at 2012 Rostelecom Cup and 12th at the 2013 Four Continents Championships. Later he explained that he had a series of injuries during the earlier part of the season, which prevented him from performing to his capacity.

At the 2013 World Championships, he scored a personal best of 91.56 points in the short program—second only to Patrick Chan—and received a small silver medal for the segment. Another personal best, 174.92 points, saw him place first in the long program and win a small gold medal. Overall, Ten won the silver medal with a total score of 266.48 points—just 1.3 points less than Chan. He became the first person from Kazakhstan to stand on a World podium in figure skating.

In June 2013, Carroll and Ten moved to the Toyota Sports Center in El Segundo, California.

=== 2013–2014 season ===
Ten withdrew from his first 2013–14 Grand Prix assignment, the 2013 Skate America, due to an infection causing black spots on his ankles and an infection in his jaw. He competed at the 2013 Cup of China and placed fourth.

In February 2014, Ten competed at the 2014 Winter Olympics in Sochi. He placed ninth in the short program, third in the free skate, and won the bronze medal—it was the first ever Olympic medal for Kazakhstan in figure skating. He wore unmatched boots after having tried six pairs. Ten was named Breakthrough of the Year by the Agency of Sport and Physical Education of Kazakhstan and awarded a car by the mayor of Almaty. He did not participate in the 2014 World Championships.

During the summer, Ten's ice show Olympic Energy brought international skaters, including twelve Olympic medalists, to Kazakhstan, with the proceeds supporting the sport's development in the country and the treatment of a child with neuroleukemia.

In August 2014, he signed a contract with All That Sports management company established by Yuna Kim.

=== 2014–2015 season ===
For the 2014–15 season, Ten was assigned to the 2014 Skate America and 2014 Trophée Éric Bompard. At the Skate America event, he fell on the opening quadruple jumps in both the short program and the free skating, and earned fourth. At the Trophée Éric Bompard competition, he placed first in the short program, then won bronze after the free skating. In December, at the 2014 Golden Spin of Zagreb event, he won gold.

At the 2015 Four Continents Championships in Seoul, South Korea, Ten set personal best scores of 97.61 and 191.85 points in the short program and free skating, respectively. He placed first in both segments of the competition and won the title with total points of 289.46, the third highest score at an ISU championship at the time.

At the 2015 World Championships, Ten was in third place after the short program and first in the free skate. With a total of 267.72 points, he won the bronze medal.

=== 2015–2016 season ===
Ten planned to start the season at the 2015 Skate Canada Autumn Classic, but had to withdraw due to an injury. With a lower back and hip injury, he placed 9th at the 2015 Skate America. At the 2015 Trophée Éric Bompard, he placed 4th at the short program segment of the competition, before the event was cancelled due to the November 2015 Paris Attacks.

Ten withdrew from the 2016 Four Continents Figure Skating Championships, again due to an injury. After that, he placed 2nd at the 2016 Coupe du Printemps competition with a new free skating program, Romeo and Juliet. At the competition, he attempted a quad salchow jump in his free skating. Ten finished 11th at the 2016 World Figure Skating Championships.

=== 2016–2017 season ===
Ten withdrew from the 2016 Skate America. He won the silver medal at the 2016 Trophée de France. Ten won gold at the 2017 Winter Universiade in Almaty, after placing first in both the short and free programs. He placed tenth at the Asian Winter Games, and ended the season with a sixteenth-place finish at the World Championships. During this season, Ten mainly worked with Nikolai Morozov.

=== 2017–2018 season ===
During the summer of 2017, Ten worked with Benoît Richaud and David Wilson to prepare for his Olympic season programs. While visiting South Korea for an ice show, Ten suffered a right ankle injury. He stayed in South Korea during the rehabilitation period for his ankle. However, he still competed in his Grand Prix events, first at the Rostelecom Cup placing 9th, and then at the Internationaux de France placing 8th. At the Four Continents Championships in late January, he placed 15th. Ten finished 27th at the 2018 Winter Olympics in Pyeongchang. This was his final Olympic appearance before his murder in July.

=== 2018–2019 season ===
According to Lori Nichol, Ten had a plan to create his short program with her in Toronto at the end of July. He was going to reuse his free skating from the 2017–2018 season, after rearranging it in the updated ISU format (30 seconds shorter) with David Wilson.

== Personal life ==
In May 2014, Ten graduated from the Kazakh Academy of Sports and Tourism with a Red Diploma. By 2015, he began working on his MBA program (Oil and Gas) at the Business School of the Kazakh-British Technical University.

In July 2015, the media reported on Ten's interest in photography. There is a separate social media page where he posted the photos he took. Celebrities who modeled for or collaborated with him included Dinara Baktybayeva, Aissulu Azimbayeva, Aliya Telebarisova, Sabina Altynbekova and Serik Sapiyev.

== Death ==
Ten was stabbed in the thigh on 19 July 2018 in Almaty by two carjackers who were attempting to steal his car mirrors, which were worth about 59 U.S. dollars. After being stabbed, Ten lost about 3 litres (5.3 imp pt) of blood and died from the severe blood loss at the Central Clinical Hospital in Almaty, three hours after being admitted.

The Kazakhstan Minister of Culture and Sport Arystanbek Muhamediuly paid tribute to Ten, saying "Denis Ten was an incredible figure skater, the legend of our sport, our pride." United States figure skaters Adam Rippon, Alex Shibutani, Gracie Gold, Ashley Wagner, and Mirai Nagasu, who used to train with Ten, also paid tribute to him, along with several other international figure skaters including Patrick Chan, Tessa Virtue, Scott Moir, Yuna Kim, Evgenia Medvedeva, Li Zijun, and many others. IOC president Thomas Bach stated, "Denis Ten was a great athlete and a great ambassador for his sport. A warm personality and a charming man. Such a tragedy to lose him at such a young age."

The two suspects—both male, one aged 23 and the other 24 years old—were apprehended the next day. In January 2019, they were sentenced to 18 years in a penal colony.

A civil funeral service for Ten took place on 21 July 2018 in Almaty. Ten's coffin was taken to the Baluan Sholak Sports Palace, where friends, family, and members of the public gathered to pay their respects. A mourning rally was also held at the Barys Arena in Astana.

There is a memorial marble and a sculpture on Baiseitova Street in Almaty (6WVV+VV).

== Programs ==
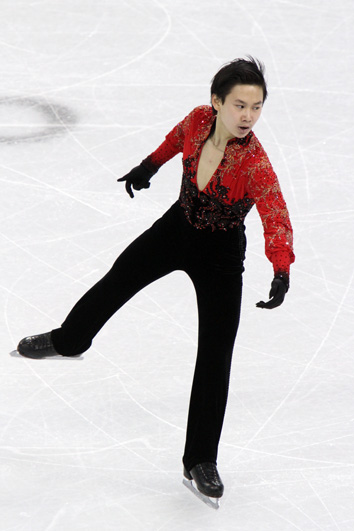
Ten at the 2010 Winter Olympics

Season	Short program	Free skating	Exhibition
2018–2019	planned: A program choreo. by Lori Nichol	planned: SOS d'un terrien en détresse by Luc Plamondon, Michel Berger performed by Dimash Qudaibergen choreo. by David Wilson	
2017–2018	Tu sei by Vittorio Grigolo choreo. by David Wilson	SOS d'un terrien en détresse by Luc Plamondon, Michel Berger performed by Dimash Qudaibergen choreo. by David Wilson	She Won't Be Mine by Denis Ten; SOS d'un terrien en détresse by Luc Plamondon, Michel Berger performed by Dimash Qudaibergen choreo. by David Wilson; Lose Yourself (Remix) by Eminem choreo. by Shae-Lynn Bourne
2016–2017	Romeo and Juliet by Sergei Prokofiev choreo. by Nikolai Morozov	Tosca by Giacomo Puccini choreo. by Nikolai Morozov	Lose Yourself (Remix) by Eminem choreo. by Shae-Lynn Bourne
2015–2016	Misa Tango by Luis Bacalov choreo. by Lori Nichol	Romeo and Juliet by Pyotr Ilyich Tchaikovsky choreo. by Lori Nichol; Misa Tango by Luis Bacalov choreo. by Lori Nichol	Made to Love performed by John Legend choreo. by Nikolai Morozov; Lose Yourself (Remix) by Eminem choreo. by Shae-Lynn Bourne
2014–2015	Caruso by Lucio Dalla performed by Joseph Calleja choreo. by Lori Nichol	Ambush from Ten Sides for Pipa, Sheng, Guitar, Cello and Orchestra (from "New Impossibilities") performed by Yo-Yo Ma and the Silk Road Ensemble; Vocussion (from "New Impossibilities") by Sandeep Das, Joseph Gramley, Dong-Won Kim, Shane Shanahan, Mark Suter choreo. by Lori Nichol	Mi Mancherai by Josh Groban choreo. by Denis Ten and Stéphane Lambiel; Money on My Mind by Sam Smith choreo. by Denis Ten and Stéphane Lambiel
2013–2014	Danse Macabre by Camille Saint-Saëns choreo. by Lori Nichol	The Lady and the Hooligan by Dmitri Shostakovich choreo. by Lori Nichol	Money on My Mind by Sam Smith choreo. by Denis Ten and Stéphane Lambiel; Mi Mancherai by Josh Groban choreo. by Denis Ten and Stéphane Lambiel
2012–2013	The Artist by Ludovic Bource: The Artist Overture; Waltz for Peppy; The Sound of Tears; L'ombre des larmes choreo. by Lori Nichol, Stéphane Lambiel	The Artist by Ludovic Bource: Happy Ending; George Valentin; Happy Ending; My Suicide; Peppy and George choreo. by Lori Nichol, Stéphane Lambiel	Singin' in the Rain choreo. by Stéphane Lambiel
2011–2012	Elegie Op. 3 No. 1 by Sergei Rachmaninoff choreo. by Lori Nichol	Adios Nonino by Astor Piazzolla choreo. by Lori Nichol	Per Te by Josh Groban choreo. by Denis Ten; Cinema Paradiso by Ennio Morricone choreo. by Fedor Andreev and Denis Ten
2010–2011	Primavera Porteño by Astor Piazzolla choreo. by Stéphane Lambiel	Totentanz; Piano Concerto No. 2 by Franz Liszt choreo. by Lori Nichol	
2009–2010	Sing, Sing, Sing by Louis Prima choreo. by Tatiana Tarasova	Pasodoble; Concierto de Aranjuez by Joaquín Rodrigo choreo. by Tatiana Tarasova	You Are Not Alone; Black or White by Michael Jackson
2008–2009	Flamenco; Once Upon a Time in Mexico by Brian Setzer choreo. by Tatiana Tarasova	Piano Concerto No. 2 by Sergei Rachmaninoff choreo. by Tatiana Tarasova	You Are Not Alone; Black or White by Michael Jackson; Swan Lake; Techno Music choreo. by Mikhail Potchitalin
2007–2008	Flamenco; Once Upon a Time in Mexico by Brian Setzer choreo. by Tatiana Tarasova	Peer Gynt Suite by Edvard Grieg choreo. by Tatiana Tarasova	
2006–2007	Fantasy on the theme of Faust by Charles Gounod	The Mask by Randy Edelman; Moonlight Serenade by Glenn Miller; Chattanooga Choo Choo; Summertime by George Gershwin	

== Competitive highlights ==
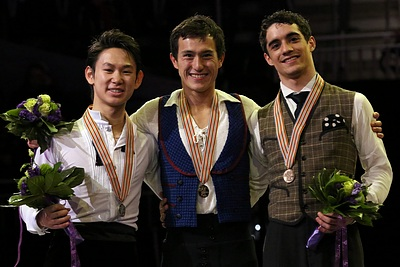
Ten on the 2013 World Championships podium

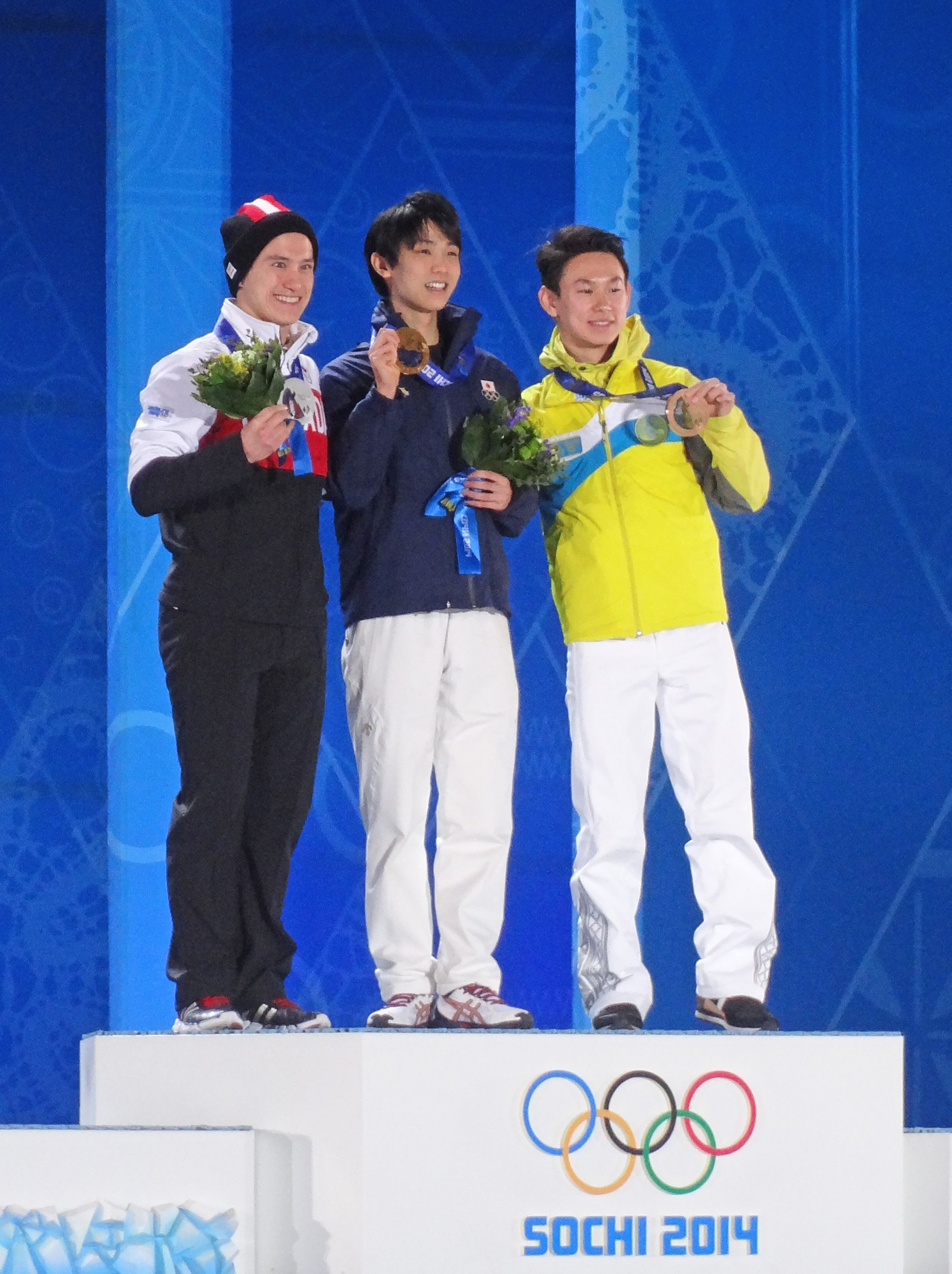
Ten on the 2014 Winter Olympics podium

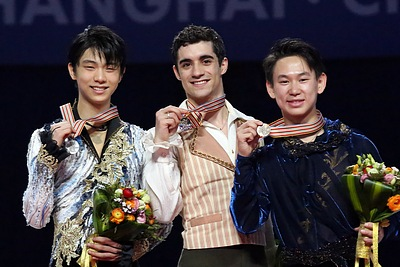
Ten on the 2015 World Figure Skating Championships podium

GP: Grand Prix; CS: Challenger Series; JGP: Junior Grand Prix

International
Event	04–05	05–06	06–07	07–08	08–09	09–10	10–11	11–12	12–13	13–14	14–15	15–16	16–17	17–18
Winter Olympics						11th				3rd				27th
World Championships					8th	13th	14th	7th	2nd		3rd	11th	16th	WD
Four Continents Championships					9th	10th		6th	12th	4th	1st			15th
GP Cup of China						10th				4th				
GP NHK Trophy							12th							
GP Rostelecom Cup									9th					9th
GP Skate America							11th	5th		WD	4th	9th	WD	
GP Skate Canada						7th		5th	6th					
GP Trophée Éric Bompard											3rd	4th	2nd	8th
CS Golden Spin of Zagreb						1st		2nd			1st	1st	WD	4th
Asian Games							1st						10th	
Coupe du Printemps												2nd		
Cup of Nice														5th
Ice Challenge										1st				
Istanbul Cup								1st						
Merano Cup										1st				
Nebelhorn Trophy								9th	7th					
NRW Trophy						4th						2nd		
Winter Universiade										WD			1st	
Volvo Open Cup									1st					
International: Junior
World Junior Championships			26th	16th	4th	9th		4th						
Junior Grand Prix Final					5th									
JGP Belarus					1st									
JGP Estonia				10th										
JGP France					4th									
JGP Netherlands			10th											
JGP Romania				6th										
Dragon Trophy			1st											
Haabersti Cup			1st											
Hellmut Seibt				1st										
NRW Trophy				1st										
Toruń Cup							1st							
National
Kazakh Championships	4th	1st	2nd											
Team events
Team Challenge; Cup												3rd T 7th P		

== Detailed results ==
Small medals for short programs and free skating awarded only at ISU Championships.

2017–18 season
Date	Event	SP	FS	Total
16–17 February 2018	2018 Winter Olympics	27; 70.12	–	27; 70.12
22–28 January 2018	2018 Four Continents Championships	11; 75.30	15; 135.52	15; 210.82
6–9 December 2017	2017 CS Golden Spin of Zagreb	1; 80.50	5; 148.31	4; 228.81
17–19 November 2017	2017 Internationaux de France	7; 83.70	10; 144.87	8; 228.57
20–22 October 2017	2017 Rostelecom Cup	10; 69.00	8; 145.35	9; 214.35
2016–17 season
Date	Event	SP	FS	Total
29 March – 2 April 2017	2017 World Championships	9; 90.18	20; 144.13	16; 234.31
23–26 February 2017	2017 Asian Winter Games	9; 72.98	13; 125.90	10; 198.88
1–5 February 2017	2017 Winter Universiade	1; 94.91	1; 172.06	1; 266.97
11–13 November 2016	2016 Trophée de France	3; 89.21	3; 180.05	2; 269.26
2015–16 season
Date	Event	SP	FS	Total
28 March – 3 April 2016	2016 World Championships	12; 78.55	12; 151.58	11; 230.13
11–13 March 2016	2016 Coupe du Printemps	1; 86.95	2; 133.09	2; 220.04
3–5 December 2015	2015 Golden Spin of Zagreb	1; 94.03	1; 182.36	1; 276.39
24–29 November 2015	2015 NRW Trophy	3; 82.63	2; 159.28	2; 241.91
13–15 November 2015	2015 Trophée Éric Bompard	4; 80.10	cancelled	
23–25 October 2015	2015 Skate America	6; 79.02	11; 122.50	9; 201.52
2014–15 season
Date	Event	SP	FS	Total
23–29 March 2015	2015 World Championships	3; 85.89	1; 181.83	3; 267.72
9–15 February 2015	2015 Four Continents Championships	1; 97.61	1; 191.85	1; 289.46
4–7 December 2014	2014 Golden Spin of Zagreb	1; 92.50	2; 157.43	1; 249.94
21–23 November 2014	2014 Trophée Éric Bompard	1; 91.78	5; 144.50	3; 236.28
24–26 October 2014	2014 Skate America	4; 77.18	4; 147.56	4; 224.74
2013–14 season
Date	Event	SP	FS	Total
6–22 February 2014	2014 Winter Olympics	9; 84.06	3; 171.04	3; 255.10
20–25 January 2014	2014 Four Continents Championships	5; 76.34	4; 150.03	4; 226.37
19–24 November 2013	2013 Ice Challenge	1; 88.19	1; 173.19	1; 261.38
14–17 November 2013	2013 Merano Cup	1; 82.21	2; 148.91	1; 231.12
1–3 November 2013	2013 Cup of China	4; 77.05	3; 147.75	4; 224.80
2012–13 season
Date	Event	SP	FS	Total
10–17 March 2013	2013 World Championships	2; 91.56	1; 174.92	2; 266.48
6–11 February 2013	2013 Four Continents Championships	7; 78.05	17; 119.21	12; 197.26
1–10 January 2013	20th Volvo Open Cup	1; 79.21	2; 125.12	1; 204.33
9–11 November 2012	2012 Rostelecom Cup	9; 59.42	9; 118.35	9; 177.77
26–28 October 2012	2012 Skate Canada International	4; 75.26	8; 128.44	6; 203.70
27–29 September 2012	2012 Nebelhorn Trophy	4; 67.88	8; 130.51	7; 198.39
2011–12 season
Date	Event	SP	FS	Total
26 March – 1 April 2012	2012 World Championships	8; 76.00	6; 153.70	7; 229.70
27 February – 4 March 2012	2012 World Junior Championships	3; 73.78	4; 134.42	4; 208.20
7–12 February 2012	2012 Four Continents Championships	5; 77.73	7; 132.30	6; 210.03
13–18 December 2011	2011 Istanbul Cup	1; 68.75	1; 152.08	1; 220.83
8–12 December 2011	2011 Golden Spin of Zagreb	1; 76.36	2; 144.11	2; 220.47
27–30 October 2011	2011 Skate Canada International	5; 71.40	6; 140.99	5; 212.39
21–23 October 2011	2011 Skate America	6; 67.38	7; 130.60	5; 197.98
21–24 September 2011	2011 Nebelhorn Trophy	5; 68.66	9; 118.59	9; 187.25

== Legacy ==
On 22 June 2019, a memorial to Denis Ten was opened in Almaty. The two-meter bronze pedestal depicts one of the moments of the skater's final performance at the 2014 Olympic Games in Sochi. In 2026, a previously nameless street in Almaty was named after Denis Ten.

Debuting in 2019, the Denis Ten Memorial Challenge is an annual figure skating competition held in Kazakhstan and named in his honor.

After winning the gold medal at the 2026 Winter Olympics and becoming the first Kazakh Olympic figure skating champion, Mikhail Shaidorov dedicated his win to Ten stating, "It would have probably meant a lot to Denis because he paved the road for us. He paved the road for young athletes, not only for me. Perhaps this road was very thorny for him and for me, but that's the way things turned out, and I want to thank Denis for what he did for our sport, for our country. It means a lot for me and for my country because I really want to see our sport to grow in Kazakhstan. I will do everything to make that happen and I hope that little kids will sign up for this sport, that there will be conditions that encourage that, and that this medal will bring a lot of motivation to young athletes who will now know that there are no limits at all."
