= Yan Han (figure skater) =

Chinese figure skater

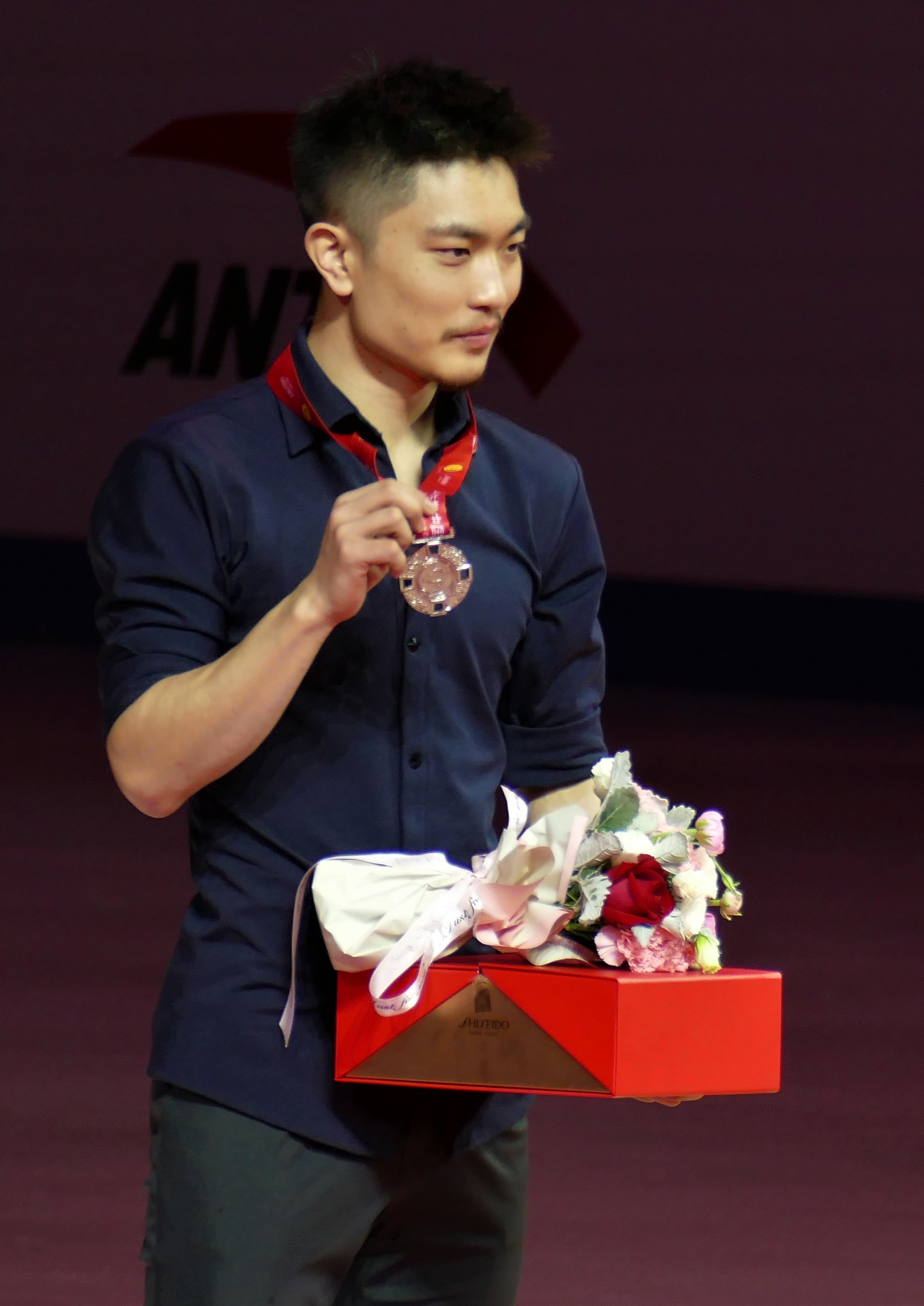
- Han Yan at 2019 Cup of China

Personal information
- Native name: 闫涵
- Full name: Yan Han
- Born: March 6, 1996 (age 30) Harbin, China
- Home town: Harbin
- Height: 1.70 m (5 ft 7 in)

Figure skating career
- Country: China
- Coach: Jia Shuguang
- Skating club: Harbin Training Centre
- Began skating: 2001
Medal record
Representing China
Figure skating: Men's singles
Four Continents Championships
Bronze medal – third place	2013 Osaka	Men's singles
Bronze medal – third place	2015 Seoul	Men's singles
Bronze medal – third place	2016 Taipei	Men's singles
Asian Winter Games
Bronze medal – third place	2017 Sapporo	Men's singles
Chinese Championships
Gold medal – first place	2010 Beijing	Men's singles
Gold medal – first place	2011 Qiqihar	Men's singles
Gold medal – first place	2018 Changchun	Men's singles
Gold medal – first place	2020 Changchun	Men's singles
Silver medal – second place	2013 Harbin	Men's singles
Silver medal – second place	2015 Changchun	Men's singles
Bronze medal – third place	2012 Changchun	Men's singles
Winter Youth Olympics
Gold medal – first place	2012 Innsbruck	Men's singles
World Junior Championships
Gold medal – first place	2012 Minsk	Men's singles
Junior Grand Prix Final
Silver medal – second place	2010–11 Beijing	Men's singles
Silver medal – second place	2011–12 Quebec	Men's singles

Yan Han
- Simplified Chinese: 闫涵
- Traditional Chinese: 閻涵
Transcriptions
Standard Mandarin
- Hanyu Pinyin: Yán Hán
- IPA: [jɛ̌n xǎn]

Yan Han (Chinese: 闫涵; pinyin: Yán Hán; Mandarin pronunciation: [jɛ̌n xǎn]; born March 6, 1996) is a former Chinese competitive figure skater. He is a three-time Four Continents bronze medalist (2013, 2015, 2016), the 2013 Cup of China champion and a four-time Chinese national champion (2010-2011, 2018, 2020).

On the junior level, he is the 2012 Youth Olympic champion, the 2012 Junior World champion, the winner of four ISU Junior Grand Prix titles, and a two-time Junior Grand Prix Final silver medalist (2010, 2011). He remains the only skater to win Junior Worlds and the Youth Olympic Games throughout the same season.

== Career ==
The only athlete in his family, Yan started skating at the age of 5. He trained in Harbin until he relocated to Beijing in early 2012.

=== 2009–2010 season: Junior Grand Prix debut ===
Yan made his ISU Junior Grand Prix debut in the 2009–2010 season. He won gold at the event in Turkey, his only assignment that season. He did not compete at the 2010 World Junior Championships due to a fracture injury.

=== 2010–2011 season ===
Yan was assigned to the 2010–11 ISU Junior Grand Prix events in Austria and Czech Republic. After winning his two JGP events, he qualified to the Junior Grand Prix Final, which was held in Beijing, China. Yan took the silver medal in his home country. He ended the season by placing 6th in his debut at the 2011 World Junior Championships in Korea.

=== 2011–2012 season: Youth Olympic and World Junior titles ===
In the 2011–2012 season, Yan began attempting a triple Axel and a quad toe loop in competition. After winning gold at his JGP events in Austria and Italy, Yan qualified for the 2011–12 Junior Grand Prix Final. At the event, held in Quebec City, Canada, he won the silver medal despite having a fever. He became the 2012 Youth Olympics champion in Innsbruck, Austria.

At the 2012 World Junior Championships, Yan became the first skater representing China to win the men's junior world title.

=== 2012–2013 season: First medal at Four Continents ===
Yan started his season at the 2012 JGP Slovenia, where he finished fifth after a shattering fall on the quadruple toe loop in the free program. He then won silver, behind Maxim Kovtun at the 2012 JGP Croatia. He did not advance to the JGP Final.

Yan took silver at the 2013 Chinese Championships. He made his senior international debut at the 2013 Four Continents Championships, where he took the bronze medal. Yan ended the season placing ninth in the men's discipline and fifth with Team China at the 2013 World Team Trophy. He then flew to Toronto to work with Lori Nichol for two new programs for the upcoming season.

=== 2013–2014 season: Grand Prix debut ===
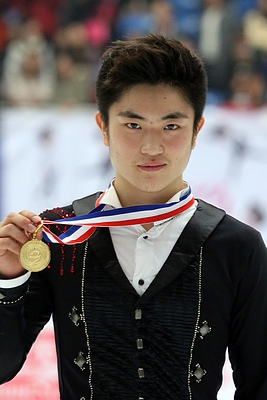
Yan at 2013 Cup of China

Yan's senior Grand Prix debut came at the 2013 Cup of China. He placed first in the short, setting a personal best score of 90.14 points and placed second in the free, winning the gold medal overall, ahead of Maxim Kovtun. Yan set a personal best overall score of 245.62 points. Yan finished fourth at the 2013 Trophée Éric Bompard, competing with a fever that he developed the day before his short program. His results qualified him for the Grand Prix Final, in which he placed sixth overall. He was selected to compete at the 2014 Winter Olympics in Sochi, where he finished seventh. He then finished seventh at the 2014 World Figure Skating Championships in Saitama, Japan.

=== 2014–2015 season: Second bronze at Four Continents ===
Yan's first assignment of the 2014 Grand Prix season was Cup of China. On November 8, during the free skate warm-up, he collided with Japan's Yuzuru Hanyu. Yan was visibly injured, but decided to compete. He placed seventh in the free program and sixth overall. Later in the same month, he placed eighth at another Grand Prix event, the 2014 Trophee Eric Bompard.

At the 2015 Four Continents Championships, Yan took the bronze medal with a combined score of 259.47, a personal best. He placed tenth at the 2015 World Championships.

=== 2015–2016 season: Third bronze at Four Continents ===
Competing in the 2015 Grand Prix season, Yan placed fourth at Skate America and took bronze at Cup of China. He went on to win his third bronze medal at the 2016 Four Continents Championships, setting personal bests in the free program (181.98) and combined score (271.55). Yan placed twenty-sixth at the 2016 World Championships.

=== 2016–2017 season ===
During the 2016 Grand Prix season, Yan placed tenth at Skate Canada and fifth at Cup of China. He ranked 10th at the 2017 Four Continents Championships. He won a bronze medal at the 2017 Asian Winter Games.

Yan's shoulder dislocated repeatedly after he sustained a fracture. As a result, he withdrew from the 2017 World Championships.

=== 2017–2018 season ===
Yan's first international competition during this season was the International Cup of Nice, where he won the gold medal. For his Grand Prix assignments, Yan competed at Skate America and the Cup of China, placing fifth at both competitions. He then became the Chinese national champion and went on to place tenth at the 2018 Four Continents Figure Skating Championships. During this season, he competed in the 2018 Winter Olympics, making it his second time at the Olympics. He ranked 23rd overall.

=== 2018–2019 season ===
Yan did not compete internationally during the season, subsequently attributing this to both injury recovery and disappointment with his performances in recent seasons. Initially intending to travel and study, he ultimately opted to plan a return to competition.

=== 2019–2020 season ===
Yan won his fourth national title at the 2020 Chinese Championships in September. Despite rumors of his retirement, he was initially assigned to 2019 CS Nebelhorn Trophy, but withdrew before the event. Yan was assigned to the 2019 Cup of China, where, despite performing only triple jumps, he placed first in the short program, narrowly ahead of Jin Boyang. After placing second in the free skate behind Jin, he won the silver medal. Speaking afterward, he thanked the Chinese Skating Association for giving him the chance to return to competition, and said that he was somewhat surprised to be competitive for a medal without quads. Yan did not receive a second Grand Prix assignment, and thus could not contend for a 2019–20 Grand Prix Final berth.

Making his return to the Four Continents Championships in February 2020, Yan placed tenth. Yan was required to self-quarantine for two weeks after returning to China, due to the COVID-19 pandemic. As a result, he was not named to the team for the 2020 World Championships, despite China having two men's spots.

=== 2020–2021 season ===
With the 2020–21 figure skating season having to deal with the COVID-19 pandemic, senior skaters were invited to a maximum of one Grand Prix event, based largely on geographic location. Yan was invited to the 2020 Cup of China, where he won the silver medal for the second consecutive year.

Yan competed at the 2021 World Championships in Stockholm, placing thirteenth, while Jin Boyang placed twenty-second. As a result, China qualified only one men's berth at the 2022 Winter Olympics in Beijing.

=== 2021–2022 season ===
For the 2021-22 Grand Prix Season, Yan was assigned to the 2021 Cup of China, which was later cancelled and replaced by the 2021 Gran Premio d'Italia. Yan's name was initially in this entry list as well, but he later withdrew.

== Age controversy ==
In February 2011, a group of Chinese skaters' ages became the subject of controversy as their birth dates published on the Chinese Skating Association's website did not match the ones listed on their bio pages on the ISU website. The controversy prompted a search for more discrepancies among Chinese figure skaters' dates of births. According to news articles published in February 2011, although Yan's birthday was listed as March 6, 1996 on ISU's website, the Chinese website suggested that he was born on that day in 1994. Officials from the State General Administration of Sports held a press conference where they attributed the discrepancies to erroneous information provided by the Chinese website.

== Programs ==
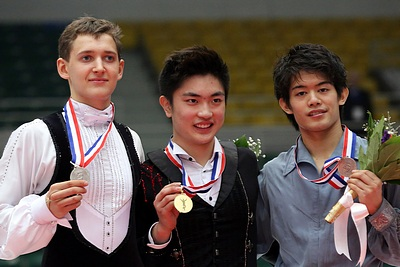
Han at the 2013 Cup of China podium

Season	Short program	Free skating	Exhibition
2020–2021	A Thousand Years by Christina Perri, David Hodges covered by Boyce Avenue choreo. by Lori Nichol	La La Land by Justin Hurwitz choreo. by Yuka Sato and Kurt Browning	La La Land by Justin Hurwitz choreo. by Yuka Sato and Kurt Browning
2019–2020	A Thousand Years by Christina Perri, David Hodges covered by Boyce Avenue choreo. by Lori Nichol	La La Land by Justin Hurwitz choreo. by Yuka Sato and Kurt Browning	I'll Take Care Of You by Brook Benton covered by Beth Hart, Joe Bonamassa choreo. by Lori Nichol
2017–2018	A Thousand Years by Christina Perri, David Hodges covered by Boyce Avenue choreo. by Lori Nichol	I'll Take Care Of You by Brook Benton covered by Beth Hart, Joe Bonamassa choreo. by Lori Nichol	Fly Me to the Moon by Bart Howard choreo. by Lori Nichol
2016–2017	I'll Take Care Of You by Brook Benton covered by Beth Hart, Joe Bonamassa choreo. by Lori Nichol	Romeo + Juliet by Craig Armstrong; Kissing You by Des'ree; Balcony Scene; Tybalt Arrives; Fight Scene choreo. by Lori Nichol	I Put a Spell on You by Screamin' Jay Hawkins
2015–2016	Sing, Sing, Sing by Louis Prima choreo. by Lori Nichol	Romeo + Juliet by Craig Armstrong; Kissing You by Des'ree; Balcony Scene; Tybalt Arrives; Fight Scene choreo. by Lori Nichol	Destiny by Aska
2014–2015	If I Were a Rich Man (from Fiddler on the Roof) choreo. by Lori Nichol	Fly Me to the Moon by Bart Howard choreo. by Lori Nichol	Lonely by Akon; Welcome to the Pleasuredome by Frankie Goes to Hollywood choreo. by Kurt Browning
2013–2014	Minor Waltz (from Double Jeux) by Michel Portal performed by Laurent Korcia; Viper's Drag by Fats Waller performed by Nigel Kennedy choreo. by Lori Nichol	Gourmet Valse Tartare (from Hannibal) by Klaus Badelt; The Blue Danube by Johann Strauss II choreo. by Lori Nichol	The Impossible Dream by Mitch Leigh, Joe Darion choreo. by Jiang Hailan
2012–2013	Jalousie 'Tango Tzigane' by Jacob Gade; Adiós Nonino; Libertango by Astor Piazzolla choreo. by Jiang Hailan	Masquerade Suite by Aram Khachaturian choreo. by Jiang Hailan	La Vie en rose by Louis Armstrong choreo. by Jiang Hailan
2011–2012	Waltz No.2 by Dmitri Shostakovich choreo. by Jiang Hailan	Zigeunerweisen by Pablo de Sarasate choreo. by Jiang Hailan	La Vie en rose by Louis Armstrong choreo. by Jiang Hailan
2010–2011	The Cotton Club by John Barry choreo. by Jiang Hailan	Zigeunerweisen by Pablo de Sarasate choreo. by Jiang Hailan	Embraceable You by Rod Stewart choreo. by Jiang Hailan
2009–2010	The Cotton Club by John Barry choreo. by Jiang Hailan	Rhapsody in Blue by George Gershwin choreo. by Jiang Hailan	

== Competitive highlights ==
GP: Grand Prix; CS: Challenger Series; JGP: Junior Grand Prix

International
Event	09–10	10–11	11–12	12–13	13–14	14–15	15–16	16–17	17–18	19–20	20–21	21–22
Olympics					7th				23rd			
Worlds					7th	10th	26th	WD			13th	
Four Continents				3rd		3rd	3rd	10th	10th	10th		
GP Final					6th							
GP Cup of China					1st	6th	3rd	5th	5th	2nd	2nd	C
GP Italy												WD
GP France					4th	8th						
GP Skate America							4th		5th			
GP Skate Canada								10th				
CS Nebelhorn										WD		
Asian Games								3rd				
Asian Trophy			1st									
Cup of Nice									1st			
International: Junior
Junior Worlds		6th	1st									
Youth Olympics			1st									
JGP Final		2nd	2nd									
JGP Austria		1st	1st									
JGP Croatia				2nd								
JGP Czech Rep.		1st										
JGP Italy			1st									
JGP Slovenia				5th								
JGP Turkey	1st											
National
Chinese NG			2nd				2nd					
Chinese Champ.	1st	1st	3rd	2nd	4th	2nd			1st	1st		
Team events
Olympics					7th T 4th P				6th T 7th P			
World Team Trophy				5th T 9th P		5th T 3rd P						
TBD = Assigned; WD = Withdrew; C = Event cancelled T = Team result; P = Personal result. Medals awarded for team result only.

== Detailed results ==
Small medals for short program and free skating awarded only at ISU Championships. Personal bests highlighted in bold.

=== 2013–14 to present ===
2020–21 season
Date	Event	SP	FS	Total
March 22–28, 2021	2021 World Championships	12; 81.52	14; 153.79	13; 235.31
November 6–8, 2020	2020 Cup of China	2; 92.56	2; 172.25	2; 264.81
2019–20 season
Date	Event	SP	FS	Total
February 4–9, 2020	2020 Four Continents Championships	11; 82.32	8; 157.09	10; 239.41
November 8–10, 2019	2019 Cup of China	1; 86.46	2; 162.99	2; 249.45
September 14–16, 2019	2020 Chinese Championships	2; 83.03	1; 148.47	1; 231.50
2017–18 season
Date	Event	SP	FS	Total
February 15–23, 2018	2018 Winter Olympics	19; 80.63	23; 132.38	23; 213.01
February 9–12, 2018	2018 Winter Olympics (team event)	7; 77.10	–	6T
January 22–28, 2018	2018 Four Continents Championships	5; 84.74	12; 143.19	10; 227.93
December 23–24, 2017	2018 Chinese Championships	1; 72.32	1; 174.85	1; 247.17
November 24–26, 2017	2017 Skate America	4; 85.97	7; 142.36	5; 228.33
November 3–5, 2017	2017 Cup of China	6; 82.22	4; 172.39	5; 254.61
October 24–28, 2017	2017 Cup of Nice	1; 94.29	1; 165.38	1; 259.67
2016–17 season
Date	Event	SP	FS	Total
February 23–26, 2017	2017 Asian Winter Games	3; 91.56	3; 180.30	3; 271.86
February 15–19, 2017	2017 Four Continents Championships	6; 84.08	10; 151.37	10; 235.45
November 18–20, 2016	2016 Cup of China	8; 75.04	5; 155.15	5; 230.19
October 28–30, 2016	2016 Skate Canada International	6; 72.86	11; 136.25	10; 209.11
2015–16 season
Date	Event	SP	FS	Total
March 28 – April 3, 2016	2016 World Championship	26; 62.56	DNQ	26; 62.56
February 16–21, 2016	2016 Four Continents Championships	3; 89.57	3; **181.98**	3; **271.55**
November 6–8, 2015	2015 Cup of China	6; 73.97	3; 156.36	3; 230.33
October 23–25, 2015	2015 Skate America	2; 86.53	5; 149.50	4; 236.03
2014–15 season
Date	Event	SP	FS	Total
April 16–19, 2015	2015 ISU World Team Trophy	2; 87.13	4; 163.14	3; 250.27
March 23–29, 2015	2015 World Championships	5; 84.45	13; 144.70	10; 229.15
February 10–15, 2015	2015 Four Continents Championships	3; 87.34	4; 172.13	3; 259.47
December 27–28, 2014	2015 Chinese Championships	2; 75.14	2; 153.05	2; 228.19
November 21–23, 2014	2014 Trophée Éric Bompard	10; 73.18	6; 143.67	8; 216.85
November 7–9, 2014	2014 Cup of China	3; 79.21	7; 127.44	6; 206.65
2013–14 season
Date	Event	SP	FS	Total
March 24–30, 2014	2014 World Championships	5; 86.70	11; 145.21	7; 231.91
February 13–14, 2014	2014 Winter Olympics	8; 85.66	7; 160.54	7; 246.20
December 28–29, 2013	2014 Chinese Championships	2; 78.02	4; 129.59	4; 207.61
December 5–8, 2013	2013–14 Grand Prix Final	4; 77.75	6; 154.80	6; 232.55
November 15–17, 2013	2013 Trophée Éric Bompard	4; 84.34	6; 129.89	4; 214.23
November 1–3, 2013	2013 Cup of China	1; **90.14**	2; 155.48	1; 245.62

=== 2009–10 to 2012–13 ===
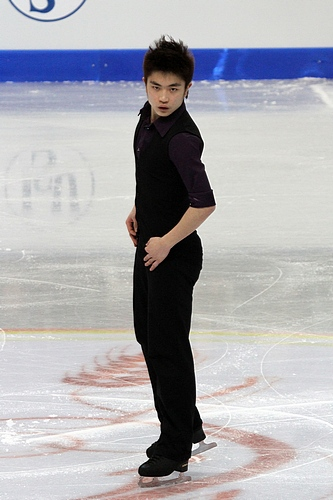
Yan at the 2012 World Junior Championships

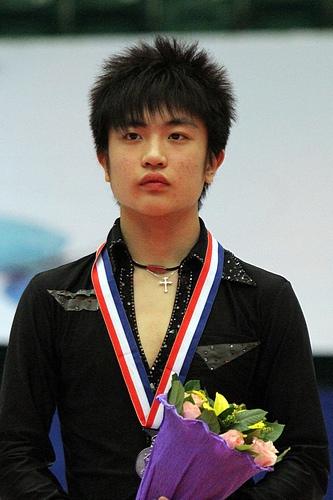
Yan at the 2010–11 Junior Grand Prix Final

2012–13 season
Date	Event	Level	SP	FS	Total
April 11–14, 2013	2013 ISU World Team Trophy	Senior	10; 64.54	9; 143.27	9; 207.81
February 8–11, 2012	2013 Four Continents Championships	Senior	2; 85.08	5; 150.14	3; 235.22
December 20–21, 2012	2013 Chinese Championships	Senior	2; 68.77	2; 143.03	2; 211.80
October 4–7, 2012	2012 Junior Grand Prix Croatia	Junior	1; 70.47	2; 141.63	2; 212.10
September 26–29, 2012	2012 Junior Grand Prix Slovenia	Junior	2; 65.66	5; 115.03	5; 180.69
2011–12 season
Date	Event	Level	SP	FS	Total
Feb. 27 – March 4, 2012	2012 World Junior Championships	Junior	2; 74.88	1; 147.57	1; 222.45
January 14–22, 2012	2012 Winter Youth Olympics	Junior	1; 59.65	1; 132.80	1; 192.45
January 4–6, 2012	12th Chinese National Winter Games	Senior	2; 77.15	1; 154.30	2; 231.45
December 7–12, 2011	2011 Junior Grand Prix Final	Junior	3; 64.23	1; 141.70	2; 205.93
October 5–8, 2011	2011 Junior Grand Prix Italy	Junior	1; 72.07	1; 147.30	1; 219.37
Sept. 28 – October 1, 2011	2011 Junior Grand Prix Austria	Junior	1; 68.78	1; 137.08	1; 205.86
September 20–23, 2011	2012 Chinese Championships	Senior	5; 62.60	4; 134.84	3; 197.44
August 22–26, 2011	2011 Asian Trophy	Senior	2; 63.19	1; 131.12	1; 194.31
2010–11 season
Date	Event	Level	SP	FS	Total
Feb. 27 – March 6, 2011	2011 World Junior Championships	Junior	8; 60.89	5; 126.60	6; 187.49
December 23–24, 2010	2011 Chinese Championships	Senior	1; 71.27	1; 134.74	1; 206.01
December 8–12, 2010	2010–11 Junior Grand Prix Final	Junior	3; 67.29	3; 118.76	2; 186.05
October 13–16, 2010	2010 Junior Grand Prix Czech Republic	Junior	1; 66.19	1; 127.43	1; 193.62
September 15–18, 2010	2010 Junior Grand Prix Austria	Junior	5; 53.79	1; 116.69	1; 170.48
2009–10 season
Date	Event	Level	SP	FS	Total
October 14–17, 2009	2009 Junior Grand Prix Turkey	Junior	3; 61.21	1; 121.33	1; 182.54
September 3–5, 2009	2010 Chinese Championships	Senior	1; 64.78	1; 129.90	1; 194.68
