= Felicia Zhang =

American pair skater

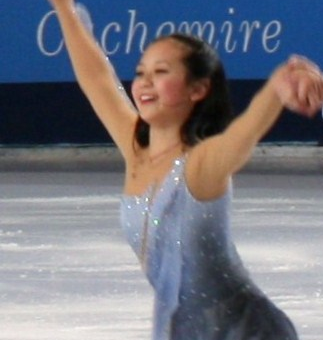
- Felicia Zhang at the 2010 Trophée Eric Bompard

Personal information
- Born: September 22, 1993 (age 32) Riverdale, New York, U.S.
- Home town: Plainsboro Township, New Jersey, U.S.
- Height: 5 ft 0 in (1.53 m)

Figure skating career
- Country: United States
- Began skating: 2000
- Retired: July 16, 2014

Felicia Zhang (born September 22, 1993) is an American former pair skater. With Nathan Bartholomay, she is a two-time U.S. national medalist (silver in 2014, bronze in 2013) and competed at the 2014 Winter Olympics.

== Personal life ==
Felicia Zhang was born in New York City and grew up in Plainsboro Township, New Jersey. Her mother, a doctor's receptionist, and father, a computer information technology worker, are both from Beijing, China. After graduating in 2011 from West Windsor-Plainsboro High School South, she began studying at the University of South Florida, majoring in psychology.

== Career ==
=== Early years and single skating ===
Zhang started skating at the age of seven after attending a skating birthday party. In singles, Zhang won the novice bronze medal at the 2008 U.S. Championships, and placed sixth on the junior level at the 2010 U.S. Championships.

=== Partnership with Toth ===
Zhang teamed up with Taylor Toth in 2009. They won the junior gold medal at the 2010 U.S. Championships, and finished 9th at the 2010 World Junior Championships.

Zhang/Toth moved up to the senior level for the 2010–11 season and competed in the Grand Prix at Skate America, where they finished 7th, and Trophée Eric Bompard, where they finished 5th. They withdrew from the 2011 U.S. Championships due to Zhang's rib injuries. On March 10, 2011, Zhang and Toth announced they had parted ways. During their partnership, they were coached by Jeff DiGregorio in Newark, Delaware.

=== Partnership with Bartholomay ===
Zhang teamed up with Nathan Bartholomay by May 2011. They are coached by Jim Peterson and Lyndon Johnston at the Ice and Sports Complex in Ellenton, Florida. In their first season, they were eighth at the U.S. Championships.

Zhang/Bartholomay won bronze at the 2013 U.S. Championships and were assigned to the 2013 Four Continents Championships where they placed fourth.

In the 2013–14 season, Zhang/Bartholomay received two Grand Prix assignments, the 2013 Skate America and 2013 Cup of China, finishing 7th and 6th. After winning the silver medal at the 2014 U.S. Championships, ahead of Caydee Denney / John Coughlin, they were named in the U.S. team to the Olympics and listed as first alternates for the World Championships. Zhang/Bartholomay finished 12th at the 2014 Winter Olympics in Sochi. They were called up to replace the injured Denney/Coughlin at the 2014 World Championships. They announced the end of their partnership on July 16, 2014.

== Programs ==
=== With Bartholomay ===
Season	Short program	Free skating	Exhibition
2013–2014	Carousel Waltz by Rodgers and Hammerstein	Les Misérables by Claude-Michel Schönberg	
2012–2013	Theme from Cocoon by James Horner	West Side Story by Leonard Bernstein	One Hand, One Heart (from West Side Story) by Leonard Bernstein
2011–2012	Piano Concerto by George Gershwin	Concierto de Aranjuez by Joaquín Rodrigo	

=== With Toth ===
Season	Short program	Free skating	Exhibition
2010–2011	Claire de Lune by Claude Debussy	Miss Saigon Rhapsody by Claude-Michel Schönberg, Alain Boublil performed by the Bournemouth Symphony Orchestra	Orange Colored Sky
2009–2010	Chamber music performed by Rondò Veneziano	Wonderland performed by Maksim Mrvica; Queen medley	Like a Prayer by Madonna

=== Single skating ===
Season	Short program	Free skating
2009–2011	Swan Lake by Pyotr I. Tchaikovsky	Butterfly Lovers' Violin Concerto by Zhan-hao and Gang He Chen
2008–2009	The Last Emperor by Ryuichi Sakamoto	Scheherazade by Nikolai Rimsky-Korsakov

== Competitive highlights ==
GP: Grand Prix; JGP: Junior Grand Prix

=== Pair skating with Bartholomay ===
International
Event	2011–12	2012–13	2013–14
Winter Olympics			12th
World Champ.			14th
Four Continents Champ.		4th	
GP Cup of China			6th
GP Skate America			7th
U.S. Classic		4th	7th
National
U.S. Championships	8th	3rd	2nd

=== Pair skating with Toth ===
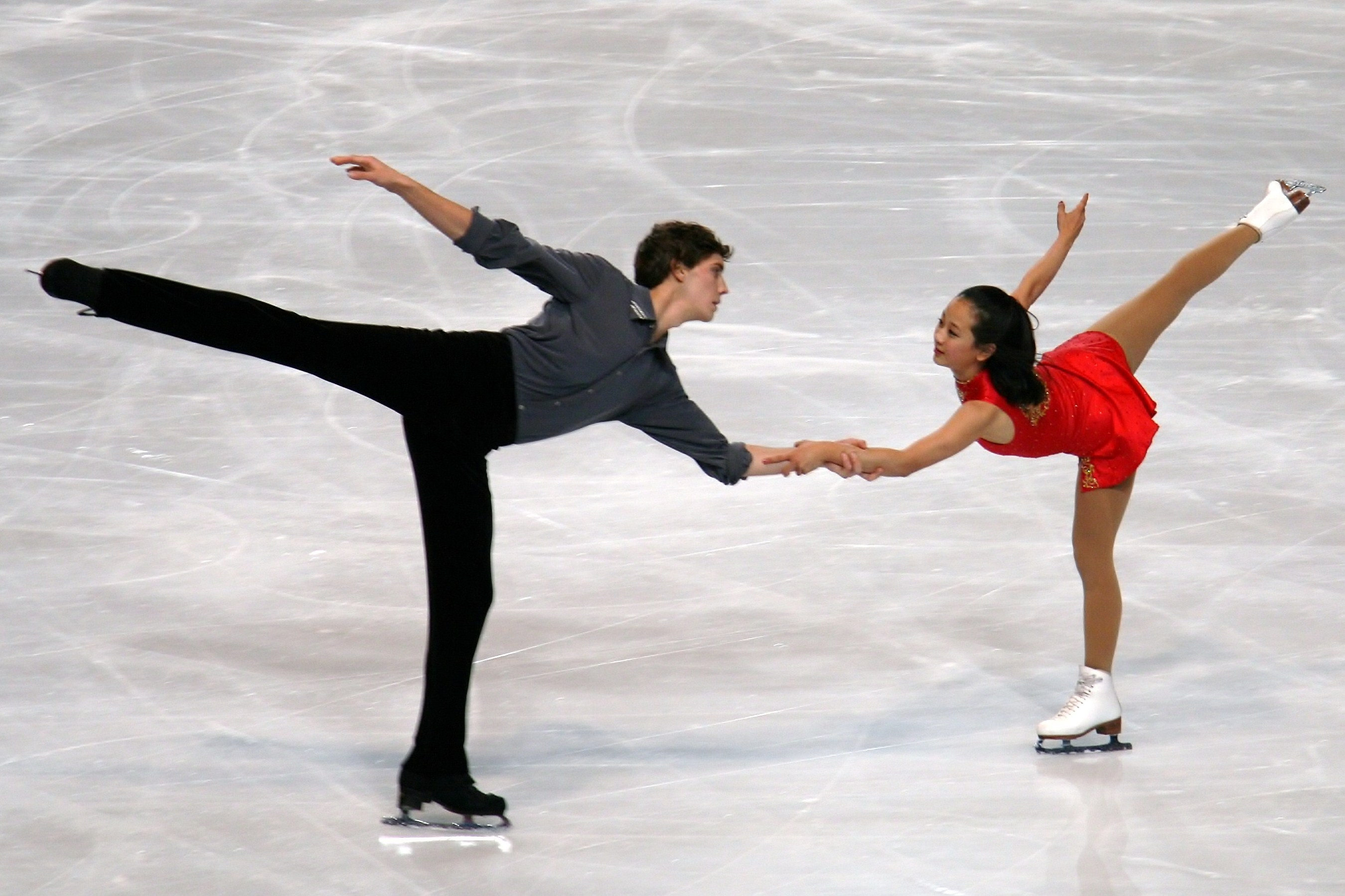
Zhang/Toth at the 2010 Trophée Eric Bompard

International
Event	2009–10	2010–11
GP Skate America		7th
GP Trophée Eric Bompard		5th
Nebelhorn Trophy		7th
International: Junior
World Junior Championships	9th	
JGP Germany	11th	
JGP Poland	6th	
National
U.S. Championships	1st J	WD
J = Junior level; WD = Withdrew

=== Single skating ===
International
Event	09–10	10–11
JGP Germany		7th
National
U.S. Championships	6th J	WD
WD = Withdrew; J = Junior
