= Nikol Gosviani =

Russian figure skater

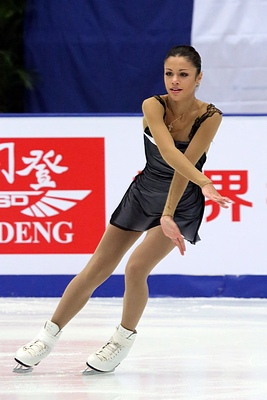

Personal information
- Native name: Николь Романовна Госвияни
- Full name: Nikol Romanovna Gosviani
- Born: 9 September 1996 (age 30) Saint Petersburg, Russia
- Height: 1.64 m (5 ft 4 1/2 in)

Figure skating career
- Country: Italy
- Began skating: 1999

Nikol Romanovna Gosviani (Russian: Николь Романовна Госвияни; born 9 September 1996) is a former Russian figure skater. She placed sixth at the 2013 European Championships.

== Personal life ==
Nikol Gosviani was born 9 September 1996 in Saint Petersburg. She studied music. She married Italian pair skater Leo Luca Sforza in June 2016.

== Career ==
Gosviani was coached by Natalia Golubeva until 2009 when she switched to Alexei Urmanov, the 1994 Olympic champion. She finished seventh in her only Junior Grand Prix event, the 2010 JGP Japan.

In the 2012–13 season, Gosviani was the third alternate for a place at the senior Russian Championships and was admitted after three skaters withdrew. She finished sixth in her debut at the event. With several skaters above her not age-eligible, Gosviani was named to the Russian team for the European Championships. She attained the minimum TES for the event at the Toruń Cup, where she won gold in the junior ladies' event. Gosviani made her senior international debut at the 2013 European Championships. She was twelfth in the short, fifth in the free, and sixth overall.

In the 2013–14 season, Gosviani's first international event was the Ondrej Nepela Memorial in October. She won the short program and placed second in the free to win the silver medal overall behind Haruka Imai of Japan. Gosviani was assigned to the 2013 Cup of China after Polina Korobeynikova withdrew. She placed fifth at the event, which was her senior Grand Prix debut. She finished eighth at the 2013 Rostelecom Cup and ninth at the 2014 Russian Championships. In July 2014, she decided to train in Moscow. Soon after, she tore ligaments in her ankle, causing her to miss the entire 2014–15 season.

In December 2015, Gosviani placed fourth at the Italian Championships.

== Programs ==
Season	Short program	Free skating
2013–2014	Storm (Piano Sonata No. 17) by Ludwig van Beethoven	Prelude G-moll, op. 23 No. 5 by Sergei Rachmaninoff
2012–2013	Nocturne by Joe Hisaishi	Berlin Concerto by Vladimir Cosma
2010–2011	Concierto de Aranjuez by Joaquín Rodrigo	Turandot by Giacomo Puccini

== Competitive highlights ==
GP: Grand Prix; JGP: Junior Grand Prix

=== For Italy ===
International
Event	2015–16	2016–17
International Cup of Nice		WD
National
Italian Championships	4th	WD
WD = Withdrew

=== For Russia ===
International
Event	07–08	10–11	12–13	13–14	14–15
Europeans			6th		
GP Cup of China				5th	
GP NHK Trophy					WD
GP Rostelecom Cup				8th	WD
Golden Bear				1st	
Nepela Trophy				2nd	
Triglav Trophy			1st		
International: Junior or novice
JGP Japan		7th			
Cup of Nice	3rd N	3rd J			
Toruń Cup			1st J		
National
Russian Champ.			6th	9th	
WD: Withdrew; Levels: N = Novice; J = Junior
