= Wang Yi (figure skater) =

Chinese figure skater

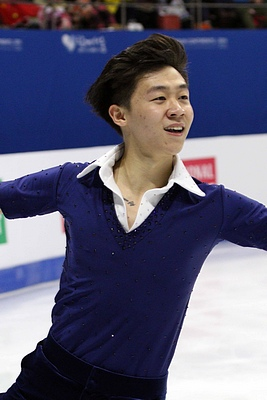

Personal information
- Born: August 18, 1992 (age 34) Changchun, China
- Height: 1.70 m (5 ft 7 in)

Figure skating career
- Country: China
- Coach: Lijie Yu
- Began skating: 2001

Wang Yi (Chinese: 王一; pinyin: Wáng Yī; born August 18, 1992) is a Chinese figure skater coach, former figure skater and an ice dancer starting from 2021. He has competed at three Four Continents Championships, reaching the top ten in 2015.

== Programs ==
Season	Short program	Free skating
2015–2016	Back to Black	Cornish Rhapsody by Hubert Bath
2014–2015	Waltz No. 2 by Dmitri Shostakovich	An American in Paris by George Gershwin
2013–2014	A Beautiful Storm by Jennifer Thomas	Four Seasons by Antonio Vivaldi
2012–2013	Peer Gynt, Suite No. 1 Op. 46 by Edvard Grieg	Nothing Else Matters; One by Metallica both performed by Apocalyptica

== Competitive highlights ==
=== As an ice dance team with Xiao Zixi ===
GP: Grand Prix

Event	22-23
National
Chinese Champ.	5th

=== As a men's single skater ===
GP: Grand Prix

International
Event	11–12	12–13	13–14	14–15	15–16	19–20
Four Continents		13th	16th	9th		
GP Bompard					8th	
GP Cup of China		6th	9th	11th		
Universiade			7th			
National
Chinese NG	5th				7th	
Chinese Champ.		5th	6th	4th	6th	3rd
Team events^{1}
World Team; Trophy		5th T 10th P				
^{1} Medals awarded for team result only. T = Team result; P = Personal result
