= 2018–19 ISU Junior Grand Prix =

- Type: ISU Junior Grand Prix
- Date: August 22 – December 9, 2018
- Season: 2018–19
- Previous: 2017–18 ISU Junior Grand Prix
- Next: 2019–20 ISU Junior Grand Prix

The 2018–19 ISU Junior Grand Prix was a series of junior international competitions organized by the International Skating Union that were held from August 2018 through December 2018. It was the junior-level complement to the 2018–19 ISU Grand Prix of Figure Skating. Medals were awarded in men's singles, women's singles, pair skating, and ice dance. Skaters earned points based on their placement at each event and the top six in each discipline qualified to compete at the 2018–19 Junior Grand Prix Final in Vancouver, Canada.

== Competitions ==
The locations of the JGP events change yearly. This season, the series was composed of the following events.

Date	Event	Location	Notes	Results
August 22–25	2018 JGP Slovakia	Bratislava, Slovakia		Details
August 29 – September 1	2018 JGP Austria	Linz, Austria		Details
September 5–8	2018 JGP Lithuania	Kaunas, Lithuania	No pairs	Details
September 12–15	2018 JGP Canada	Richmond, British Columbia, Canada		Details
September 26–29	2018 JGP Czech Republic	Ostrava, Czech Republic		Details
October 3–6	2018 JGP Slovenia	Ljubljana, Slovenia	No pairs	Details
October 10–13	2018 JGP Armenia	Yerevan, Armenia	No pairs	Details
December 6–9	2018–19 JGP Final	Vancouver, British Columbia, Canada		Details

== Entries ==
Skaters who reached the age of 13 by July 1, 2018 but had not turned 19 (singles and females of the other two disciplines) or 21 (male pair skaters and ice dancers) were eligible to compete on the junior circuit. Competitors were chosen by their countries according to their federations' selection procedures. The number of entries allotted to each ISU member federation was determined by their skaters' placements at the 2018 World Junior Championships in each discipline.

== Medalists ==
=== Men's singles ===
Competition	Gold	Silver	Bronze	Results
JGP Slovakia	(Canada) Stephen Gogolev	(Japan) Mitsuki Sumoto	(Italy) Daniel Grassl	
JGP Austria	(United States) Camden Pulkinen	(Japan) Koshiro Shimada	(Russia) Roman Savosin	
JGP Lithuania	(United States) Andrew Torgashev	(Russia) Kirill Iakovlev	(Japan) Yuto Kishina	
JGP Canada	(Russia) Petr Gumennik	(United States) Tomoki Hiwatashi	(France) Adam Siao Him Fa	
JGP Czech Republic	(Russia) Andrei Mozalev	(United States) Camden Pulkinen	(Canada) Joseph Phan	
JGP Slovenia	(Russia) Petr Gumennik	(United States) Tomoki Hiwatashi	(Japan) Koshiro Shimada	
JGP Armenia	(France) Adam Siao Him Fa	(Japan) Yuma Kagiyama	(Canada) Iliya Kovler	
(Canada) 2018–19 JGP Final	(Canada) Stephen Gogolev	(Russia) Petr Gumennik	(Japan) Koshiro Shimada	

=== Ladies' singles ===
Competition	Gold	Silver	Bronze	Results
JGP Slovakia	(Russia) Anna Shcherbakova	(Russia) Anna Tarusina	(South Korea) You Young	
JGP Austria	(Russia) Alena Kostornaia	(Russia) Alena Kanysheva	(Japan) Shiika Yoshioka	
JGP Lithuania	(Russia) Alexandra Trusova	(South Korea) Kim Ye-lim	(Russia) Ksenia Sinitsyna	
JGP Canada	(Russia) Anna Shcherbakova	(Russia) Anastasia Tarakanova	(Japan) Rion Sumiyoshi	
JGP Czech Republic	(Russia) Alena Kostornaia	(South Korea) Kim Ye-lim	(Russia) Viktoria Vasilieva	
JGP Slovenia	(Russia) Anastasia Tarakanova	(Russia) Anna Tarusina	(South Korea) Lee Hae-in	
JGP Armenia	(Russia) Alexandra Trusova	(Russia) Alena Kanysheva	(Japan) Yuhana Yokoi	
(Canada) 2018–19 JGP Final	(Russia) Alena Kostornaia	(Russia) Alexandra Trusova	(Russia) Alena Kanysheva	

=== Pairs ===
Competition	Gold	Silver	Bronze	Results
JGP Slovakia	(Russia) Anastasia Mishina / Aleksandr Galiamov	(Russia) Apollinariia Panfilova / Dmitry Rylov	(Russia) Kseniia Akhanteva / Valerii Kolesov	
JGP Austria	(Russia) Polina Kostiukovich / Dmitrii Ialin	(Russia) Anastasia Poluianova / Dmitry Sopot	(Russia) Alina Pepeleva / Roman Pleshkov	
JGP Canada	(Russia) Anastasia Mishina / Aleksandr Galiamov	(Russia) Apollinariia Panfilova / Dmitry Rylov	(Russia) Daria Kvartalova / Alexei Sviatchenko	
JGP Czech Republic	(Russia) Kseniia Akhanteva / Valerii Kolesov	(Russia) Polina Kostiukovich / Dmitrii Ialin	(United States) Sarah Feng / TJ Nyman	
(Canada) 2018–19 JGP Final	(Russia) Anastasia Mishina / Aleksandr Galiamov	(Russia) Polina Kostiukovich / Dmitrii Ialin	(Russia) Apollinariia Panfilova / Dmitry Rylov	

=== Ice dance ===
Competition	Gold	Silver	Bronze	Results
JGP Slovakia	(Russia) Elizaveta Khudaiberdieva / Nikita Nazarov	(Russia) Elizaveta Shanaeva / Devid Naryzhnyy	(United States) Eliana Gropman / Ian Somerville	
JGP Austria	(Russia) Sofia Shevchenko / Igor Eremenko	(Canada) Marjorie Lajoie / Zachary Lagha	(Russia) Eva Kuts / Dmitrii Mikhailov	
JGP Lithuania	(Russia) Arina Ushakova / Maxim Nekrasov	(United States) Avonley Nguyen / Vadym Kolesnik	(Ukraine) Darya Popova / Volodymyr Byelikov	
JGP Canada	(Canada) Marjorie Lajoie / Zachary Lagha	(Russia) Polina Ivanenko / Daniil Karpov	(Russia) Ksenia Konkina / Alexander Vakhnov	
JGP Czech Republic	(Russia) Elizaveta Khudaiberdieva / Nikita Nazarov	(Georgia (country)) Maria Kazakova / Georgy Reviya	(Russia) Diana Davis / Gleb Smolkin	
JGP Slovenia	(United States) Avonley Nguyen / Vadym Kolesnik	(Russia) Sofia Shevchenko / Igor Eremenko	(Russia) Polina Ivanenko / Daniil Karpov	
JGP Armenia	(Russia) Arina Ushakova / Maxim Nekrasov	(Georgia (country)) Maria Kazakova / Georgy Reviya	(Canada) Ellie Fisher / Simon-Pierre Malette-Paquette	
(Canada) 2018–19 JGP Final	(Russia) Sofia Shevchenko / Igor Eremenko	(Russia) Arina Ushakova / Maxim Nekrasov	(Russia) Elizaveta Khudaiberdieva / Nikita Nazarov	

== Medal standings ==
Rank	Nation	Gold	Silver	Bronze	Total
1	Russia	22	17	13	52
2	United States	3	4	2	9
3	Canada	3	1	3	7
4	France	1	0	1	2
5	Japan	0	3	6	9
6	South Korea	0	2	2	4
7	Georgia	0	2	0	2
8	Italy	0	0	1	1
8	Ukraine	0	0	1	1
Totals (9 entries)		29	29	29	87

== Qualification ==
At each event, skaters earned points toward qualification for the Junior Grand Prix Final. Following the seventh event, the top six highest-scoring skaters/teams advanced to the Final. The points earned per placement were as follows.

Placement	Singles	Pairs/Ice dance
1st	15	15
2nd	13	13
3rd	11	11
4th	9	9
5th	7	7
6th	5	5
7th	4	4
8th	3	3
9th	2	—
10th	1	—

There were originally seven tie-breakers in cases of a tie in overall points:

1. Highest placement at an event. If a skater placed 1st and 3rd, the tiebreaker is the 1st place, and that beats a skater who placed 2nd in both events.
2. Highest combined total scores in both events. If a skater earned 200 points at one event and 250 at a second, that skater would win in the second tie-break over a skater who earned 200 points at one event and 150 at another.
3. Participated in two events.
4. Highest combined scores in the free skating/free dance portion of both events.
5. Highest individual score in the free skating/free dance portion from one event.
6. Highest combined scores in the short program/short dance of both events.
7. Highest number of total participants at the events.

If a tie remained, it was considered unbreakable and the tied skaters all advanced to the Junior Grand Prix Final.

=== Qualification standings ===
Points	Men	Ladies	Pairs	Ice dance
30	(Russia) Petr Gumennik	(Russia) Alexandra Trusova (Russia) Alena Kostornaia (Russia) Anna Shcherbakova	(Russia) Anastasia Mishina / Aleksandr Galiamov	(Russia) Arina Ushakova / Maxim Nekrasov (Russia) Elizaveta Khudaiberdieva / Nikita Nazarov
28	(United States) Camden Pulkinen	(Russia) Anastasia Tarakanova	(Russia) Polina Kostiukovich / Dmitrii Ialin	(United States) Avonley Nguyen / Vadym Kolesnik (Russia) Sofia Shevchenko / Igor Eremenko (Canada) Marjorie Lajoie / Zachary Lagha
26	(France) Adam Siao Him Fa (United States) Tomoki Hiwatashi	(South Korea) Kim Ye-lim (Russia) Alena Kanysheva (Russia) Anna Tarusina	(Russia) Kseniia Akhanteva / Valerii Kolesov (Russia) Apollinariia Panfilova / Dmitry Rylov	(Georgia (country)) Maria Kazakova / Georgy Reviya
24	(United States) Andrew Torgashev (Japan) Koshiro Shimada	—	—	(Russia) Polina Ivanenko / Daniil Karpov
22	(Canada) Stephen Gogolev (Russia) Kirill Iakovlev (Japan) Yuma Kagiyama	—	(Russia) Anastasia Poluianova / Dmitry Sopot	(Russia) Elizaveta Shanaeva / Devid Naryzhnyy
20	(Russia) Andrei Mozalev (Japan) Mitsuki Sumoto	(South Korea) You Young (Japan) Rion Sumiyoshi (South Korea) Lee Hae-in	—	(Ukraine) Darya Popova / Volodymyr Byelikov
18	(Russia) Roman Savosin (Italy) Daniel Grassl (Canada) Conrad Orzel	(South Korea) Wi Seo-young	—	(Canada) Ellie Fisher / Simon-Pierre Malette-Paquette (United States) Eliana Gropman / Ian Somerville
16	(Russia) Artur Danielian	(Japan) Yuhana Yokoi (Japan) Shiika Yoshioka	(United States) Sarah Feng / TJ Nyman	(France) Loïcia Demougeot / Théo le Mercier
15	(Canada) Iliya Kovler	—		
14	—	(Japan) Nana Araki (Japan) Tomoe Kawabata	(United States) Laiken Lockley / Keenan Prochnow	(Canada) Emmy Bronsard / Aissa Bouaraguia (Canada) Natalie D'Alessandro / Bruce Waddell (Ukraine) Maria Golubtsova / Kirill Belobrov
13	(Canada) Joseph Phan (Japan) Yuto Kishina	(Hong Kong) Yi Christy Leung	(Japan) Riku Miura / Shoya Ichihashi (Canada) Patricia Andrew / Paxton Fletcher	(Canada) Alicia Fabbri / Paul Ayer
12	(United States) Ryan Dunk	—	(France) Cléo Hamon / Denys Strekalin	—
11	—	(Russia) Ksenia Sinitsyna (Russia) Viktoria Vasilieva (United States) Ting Cui (South Korea) To Ji-hun	(Russia) Alina Pepeleva / Roman Pleshkov (Russia) Daria Kvartalova / Alexei Sviatchenko (China) Tang Feiyao / Yang Yongchao	(Russia) Diana Davis / Gleb Smolkin (Russia) Ksenia Konkina / Alexander Vakhnov (Russia) Eva Kuts / Dmitrii Mikhailov
10	—	(Azerbaijan) Ekaterina Ryabova	(Ukraine) Sofiia Nesterova / Artem Darenskyi	(Italy) Sara Campanini / Francesco Riva (United States) Sophia Elder / Christopher Elder
9	(Russia) Egor Murashov (Israel) Mark Gorodnitsky	(Ukraine) Anastasiia Arkhipova	—	(Azerbaijan) Yana Buga / Georgy Pokhilyuk
8	(South Korea) An Geon-hyeong (Canada) Aleksa Rakic	(France) Anna Kuzmenko	—	(United States) Emma Gunter / Caleb Wein
7	(Georgia (country)) Irakli Maysuradze (South Korea) Cha Young-hyun	(Japan) Moa Iwano (United States) Gabriella Izzo	(Canada) Brooke McIntosh / Brandon Toste	(Russia) Ekaterina Andreeva / Ivan Desyatov
6	(Czech Republic) Matyáš Bělohradský (Sweden) Nikolaj Majorov	(Sweden) Selma Ihr	—	(Italy) Francesca Righi / Aleksei Dubrovin
5	(Russia) Artem Kovalev (Russia) Matvei Vetlugin (Ukraine) Ivan Shmuratko	(Georgia (country)) Alina Urushadze	(Slovakia) Tereza Zendulkova / Simon Fukas	(Belarus) Emiliya Kalehanova / Uladzislau Palkhouski (Canada) Ashlynne Stairs / Elliot Graham (United States) Alina Efimova / Alexander Petrov
4	(Russia) Egor Rukhin (Italy) Gabriele Frangipani (Sweden) Andreas Nordebäck	(Italy) Lucrezia Beccari (United States) Hanna Harrell (Japan) Yuna Aoki (Japan) Riko Takino (Israel) Alina Soupian	(Belarus) Darya Rabkova / Vladyslav Gresko	(United Kingdom) Emily Rose Brown / James Hernandez (Canada) Olivia McIsaac / Corey Circelli (Canada) Irina Galiyanova / Grayson Lochhead (United States) Jocelyn Haines / James Koszuta
3	(Canada) Beres Clements (Azerbaijan) Vladimir Litvintsev (Czech Republic) Radek Jakubka (Austria) Luc Maierhofer	(China) Chen Hongyi (Bulgaria) Alexandra Feigin (United States) Pooja Kalyan	(Canada) Gabrielle Levesque / Pier-Alexandre Hudon (China) Wang Yuchen / Huang Yihang	(United States) Oona Brown / Gage Brown (Canada) Miku Makita / Tyler Gunara (Ukraine) Anna Cherniavska / Volodymyr Gorovyy (France) Lou Terreau / Noe Perron
2	(South Korea) Kyeong Jae-seok	(Lithuania) Paulina Ramanauskaitė (Canada) Alison Schumacher (Austria) Olga Mikutina (Netherlands) Caya Scheepens (Canada) Sarah-Maude Blanchard (Canada) Emma Bulawka (Bulgaria) Maria Levushkina	—	
1	(United States) Dinh Tran (Japan) Sena Miyake	(Hungary) Júlia Láng (Switzerland) Maïa Mazzara (Canada) Hannah Dawson (Finland) Vera Stolt	—	

=== Qualifiers ===
No.	Men	Ladies	Pairs	Ice dance
1	(Russia) Petr Gumennik	(Russia) Alexandra Trusova	(Russia) Anastasia Mishina / Aleksandr Galiamov	(Russia) Arina Ushakova / Maxim Nekrasov
2	(United States) Camden Pulkinen	(Russia) Alena Kostornaia	(Russia) Polina Kostiukovich / Dmitrii Ialin	(Russia) Elizaveta Khudaiberdieva / Nikita Nazarov
3	(France) Adam Siao Him Fa	(Russia) Anna Shcherbakova	(Russia) Kseniia Akhanteva / Valerii Kolesov	(United States) Avonley Nguyen / Vadym Kolesnik
4	(United States) Tomoki Hiwatashi	(Russia) Anastasia Tarakanova	(Russia) Apollinariia Panfilova / Dmitry Rylov	(Russia) Sofia Shevchenko / Igor Eremenko
5	~~(United States) Andrew Torgashev~~ (withdrew)	(South Korea) Kim Ye-lim	(Russia) Anastasia Poluianova / Dmitry Sopot	(Canada) Marjorie Lajoie / Zachary Lagha
6	(Japan) Koshiro Shimada	(Russia) Alena Kanysheva	(United States) Sarah Feng / TJ Nyman	(Georgia (country)) Maria Kazakova / Georgy Reviya

Alternates

No.	Men	Ladies	Pairs	Ice dance
1	(Canada) Stephen Gogolev (called up)	(Russia) Anna Tarusina	(United States) Laiken Lockley / Keenan Prochnow	(Russia) Polina Ivanenko / Daniil Karpov
2	(Russia) Kirill Iakovlev	(South Korea) You Young	(Japan) Riku Miura / Shoya Ichihashi	(Russia) Elizaveta Shanaeva / Devid Naryzhnyy
3	(Japan) Yuma Kagiyama	(Japan) Rion Sumiyoshi	(Canada) Patricia Andrew / Paxton Fletcher	(Ukraine) Darya Popova / Volodymyr Byelikov

== Top scores ==
=== Men's singles ===
Top 10 best scores in the men's combined total
No.	Skater	Nation	Score	Event
1	Stephen Gogolev	Canada	233.58	2018–19 JGP Final
2	Camden Pulkinen	United States	223.95	2018 JGP Austria
3	Koshiro Shimada	Japan	220.45	2018 JGP Austria
4	Petr Gumennik	Russia	220.04	2018 JGP Canada
5	Andrei Mozalev	Russia	217.12	2018 JGP Czech Republic
6	Tomoki Hiwatashi	United States	215.16	2018 JGP Slovenia
7	Conrad Orzel	Canada	212.94	2018 JGP Slovenia
8	Roman Savosin	Russia	211.10	2018 JGP Austria
9	Artur Danielian	Russia	210.49	2018 JGP Slovenia
10	Mitsuki Sumoto	Japan	210.31	2018 JGP Slovakia

Top 10 best scores in the men's short program
No.	Skater	Nation	Score	Event
1	Camden Pulkinen	United States	81.01	2018 JGP Czech Republic
2	Conrad Orzel	Canada	79.66	2018 JGP Austria
3	Andrei Mozalev	Russia	78.83	2018 JGP Czech Republic
4	Stephen Gogolev	Canada	78.82	2018–19 JGP Final
5	Petr Gumennik	Russia	77.33	2018 JGP Slovenia
6	Tomoki Hiwatashi	United States	76.81	2018 JGP Canada
7	Yuma Kagiyama	Japan	75.60	2018 JGP Canada
8	Koshiro Shimada	Japan	74.78	2018 JGP Austria
9	Mark Gorodnitsky	Israel	74.66	2018 JGP Slovenia
10	Mitsuki Sumoto	Japan	74.13	2018 JGP Slovakia

Top 10 best scores in the men's free skating
No.	Skater	Nation	Score	Event
1	Stephen Gogolev	Canada	154.76	2018–19 JGP Final
2	Petr Gumennik	Russia	150.35	2018 JGP Canada
3	Camden Pulkinen	United States	147.80	2018 JGP Austria
4	Koshiro Shimada	Japan	145.67	2018 JGP Austria
5	Artur Danielian	Russia	141.19	2018 JGP Slovenia
6	Tomoki Hiwatashi	United States	140.99	2018 JGP Slovenia
7	Adam Siao Him Fa	France	140.56	2018–19 JGP Final
8	Conrad Orzel	Canada	139.70	2018 JGP Slovenia
9	Roman Savosin	Russia	139.69	2018 JGP Austria
10	Andrei Mozalev	Russia	138.29	2018 JGP Czech Republic

=== Ladies' singles ===
Top 10 best scores in the ladies' combined total
No.	Skater	Nation	Score	Event
1	Alexandra Trusova	Russia	221.44	2018 JGP Lithuania
2	Alena Kostornaia	Russia	217.98	2018–19 JGP Final
3	Anna Shcherbakova	Russia	205.39	2018 JGP Slovakia
4	Alena Kanysheva	Russia	198.14	2018–19 JGP Final
5	Kim Ye-lim	South Korea	196.34	2018 JGP Czech Republic
6	Anastasia Tarakanova	Russia	190.69	2018 JGP Canada
7	Anna Tarusina	Russia	188.24	2018 JGP Slovenia
8	Ksenia Sinitsyna	Russia	187.91	2018 JGP Lithuania
9	Yuhana Yokoi	Japan	184.09	2018 JGP Armenia
10	You Young	South Korea	183.98	2018 JGP Slovakia

Top 10 best scores in the ladies' short program
No.	Skater	Nation	Score	Event
1	Alena Kostornaia	Russia	76.32	2018–19 JGP Final
2	Alexandra Trusova	Russia	74.74	2018 JGP Lithuania
3	Anna Shcherbakova	Russia	73.18	2018 JGP Slovakia
4	Ting Cui	United States	70.20	2018 JGP Czech Republic
5	Kim Ye-lim	South Korea	69.45	2018 JGP Czech Republic
6	Alena Kanysheva	Russia	68.66	2018–19 JGP Final
7	Anna Tarusina	Russia	67.14	2018 JGP Slovakia
8	Ksenia Sinitsyna	Russia	67.12	2018 JGP Lithuania
9	Tomoe Kawabata	Japan	66.85	2018 JGP Slovenia
10	Wi Seo-yeong	South Korea	66.48	2018 JGP Czech Republic

Top 10 best scores in the ladies' free skating
No.	Skater	Nation	Score	Event
1	Alexandra Trusova	Russia	146.81	2018 JGP Armenia
2	Alena Kostornaia	Russia	141.66	2018–19 JGP Final
3	Anna Shcherbakova	Russia	132.21	2018 JGP Slovakia
4	Kim Ye-lim	South Korea	130.26	2018 JGP Lithuania
5	Alena Kanysheva	Russia	129.48	2018–19 JGP Final
6	Anastasia Tarakanova	Russia	128.68	2018–19 JGP Final
7	Yuhana Yokoi	Japan	126.47	2018 JGP Armenia
8	Anna Tarusina	Russia	122.50	2018 JGP Slovenia
9	Ksenia Sinitsyna	Russia	120.79	2018 JGP Lithuania
10	Rion Sumiyoshi	Japan	119.89	2018 JGP Canada

=== Pairs ===
Top 10 best scores in the pairs' combined total
No.	Team	Nation	Score	Event
1	Anastasia Mishina / Aleksandr Galiamov	Russia	190.63	2018–19 JGP Final
2	Polina Kostiukovich / Dmitrii Ialin	Russia	189.53	2018–19 JGP Final
3	Apollinariia Panfilova / Dmitry Rylov	Russia	186.59	2018–19 JGP Final
4	Kseniia Akhanteva / Valerii Kolesov	Russia	184.73	2018 JGP Czech Republic
5	Anastasia Poluianova / Dmitry Sopot	Russia	166.11	2018 JGP Austria
6	Sarah Feng / TJ Nyman	United States	163.44	2018 JGP Czech Republic
7	Alina Pepeleva / Roman Pleshkov	Russia	158.40	2018 JGP Austria
8	Daria Kvartalova / Alexei Sviatchenko	Russia	144.32	2018 JGP Canada
9	Cléo Hamon / Denys Strekalin	France	141.77	2018 JGP Czech Republic
10	Riku Miura / Shoya Ichihashi	Japan	141.40	2018 JGP Canada

Top 10 best scores in the pairs' short program
No.	Team	Nation	Score	Event
1	Polina Kostiukovich / Dmitrii Ialin	Russia	66.84	2018–19 JGP Final
2	Apollinariia Panfilova / Dmitry Rylov	Russia	66.44	2018–19 JGP Final
3	Kseniia Akhanteva / Valerii Kolesov	Russia	66.01	2018 JGP Czech Republic
4	Anastasia Mishina / Aleksandr Galiamov	Russia	65.22	2018 JGP Canada
5	Anastasia Poluianova / Dmitry Sopot	Russia	59.80	2018 JGP Czech Republic
6	Sarah Feng / TJ Nyman	United States	58.90	2018 JGP Czech Republic
7	Laiken Lockley / Keenan Prochnow	United States	54.93	2018 JGP Czech Republic
8	Daria Kvartalova / Alexei Sviatchenko	Russia	54.78	2018 JGP Canada
9	Alina Pepeleva / Roman Pleshkov	Russia	53.38	2018 JGP Austria
10	Tang Feiyao / Yang Yongchao	China	52.24	2018 JGP Czech Republic

Top 10 best scores in the pairs' free skating
No.	Team	Nation	Score	Event
1	Anastasia Mishina / Aleksandr Galiamov	Russia	126.26	2018–19 JGP Final
2	Polina Kostiukovich / Dmitrii Ialin	Russia	122.69	2018–19 JGP Final
3	Apollinariia Panfilova / Dmitry Rylov	Russia	120.15	2018–19 JGP Final
4	Kseniia Akhanteva / Valerii Kolesov	Russia	118.72	2018 JGP Czech Republic
5	Anastasia Poluianova / Dmitry Sopot	Russia	112.04	2018 JGP Austria
6	Alina Pepeleva / Roman Pleshkov	Russia	105.02	2018 JGP Austria
7	Sarah Feng / TJ Nyman	United States	104.54	2018 JGP Czech Republic
8	Cléo Hamon / Denys Strekalin	France	92.17	2018 JGP Czech Republic
9	Sofiia Nesterova / Artem Darenskyi	Ukraine	90.75	2018 JGP Austria
10	Riku Miura / Shoya Ichihashi	Japan	89.85	2018 JGP Canada

=== Ice dance ===
Top 10 season's best scores in the combined total (ice dance)
No.	Team	Nation	Score	Event
1	Arina Ushakova / Maxim Nekrasov	Russia	172.81	2018 JGP Armenia
2	Sofia Shevchenko / Igor Eremenko	Russia	170.66	2018–19 JGP Final
3	Marjorie Lajoie / Zachary Lagha	Canada	166.52	2018 JGP Canada
4	Avonley Nguyen / Vadym Kolesnik	United States	165.63	2018 JGP Slovenia
5	Maria Kazakova / Georgy Reviya	Georgia	164.65	2018 JGP Armenia
6	Elizaveta Khudaiberdieva / Nikita Nazarov	Russia	164.54	2018–19 JGP Final
7	Ellie Fisher / Simon-Pierre Malette-Paquette	Canada	152.46	2018 JGP Armenia
8	Elizaveta Shanaeva / Devid Naryzhnyy	Russia	152.21	2018 JGP Slovakia
9	Polina Ivanenko / Daniil Karpov	Russia	151.69	2018 JGP Slovenia
10	Diana Davis / Gleb Smolkin	Russia	148.62	2018 JGP Czech Republic

Top 10 season's best scores in the rhythm dance
No.	Team	Nation	Score	Event
1	Arina Ushakova / Maxim Nekrasov	Russia	69.18	2018 JGP Armenia
2	Sofia Shevchenko / Igor Eremenko	Russia	67.73	2018–19 JGP Final
3	Elizaveta Khudaiberdieva / Nikita Nazarov	Russia	66.29	2018–19 JGP Final
4	Marjorie Lajoie / Zachary Lagha	Canada	66.25	2018–19 JGP Final
5	Maria Kazakova / Georgy Reviya	Georgia	65.42	2018 JGP Armenia
6	Avonley Nguyen / Vadym Kolesnik	United States	65.41	2018 JGP Slovenia
7	Ellie Fisher / Simon-Pierre Malette-Paquette	Canada	60.34	2018 JGP Armenia
7	Ksenia Konkina / Alexander Vakhnov	Russia	60.34	2018 JGP Canada
9	Elizaveta Shanaeva / Devid Naryzhnyy	Russia	60.30	2018 JGP Slovakia
10	Eliana Gropman / Ian Somerville	United States	59.92	2018 JGP Slovakia

Top 10 season's best scores in the free dance
No.	Team	Nation	Score	Event
1	Arina Ushakova / Maxim Nekrasov	Russia	103.63	2018 JGP Armenia
2	Sofia Shevchenko / Igor Eremenko	Russia	102.93	2018–19 JGP Final
3	Marjorie Lajoie / Zachary Lagha	Canada	100.95	2018 JGP Canada
4	Avonley Nguyen / Vadym Kolesnik	United States	100.22	2018 JGP Slovenia
5	Maria Kazakova / Georgy Reviya	Georgia	99.23	2018 JGP Armenia
6	Elizaveta Khudaiberdieva / Nikita Nazarov	Russia	98.25	2018–19 JGP Final
7	Elizaveta Shanaeva / Devid Naryzhnyy	Russia	92.33	2018 JGP Armenia
8	Ellie Fisher / Simon-Pierre Malette-Paquette	Canada	92.12	2018 JGP Armenia
9	Diana Davis / Gleb Smolkin	Russia	92.07	2018 JGP Czech Republic
10	Polina Ivanenko / Daniil Karpov	Russia	91.91	2018 JGP Slovenia
