= 2019 U.S. Figure Skating Championships =

Figure skating competition

- Type: National Championship
- Date: January 19 – January 27
- Season: 2018–19
- Location: Detroit, Michigan
- Host: U.S. Figure Skating
- Venue: Little Caesars Arena

Champions
- Men's singles: Nathan Chen (Senior) & Ryan Dunk (Junior)
- Women's singles: Alysa Liu (Senior) & Gabriella Izzo (Junior)
- Pairs: Ashley Cain and Timothy LeDuc (Senior) & Laiken Lockley and Keenan Prochnow (Junior)
- Ice dance: Madison Hubbell and Zachary Donohue (Senior) & Caroline Green and Gordon Green (Junior)
- Previous: 2018 U.S. Championships
- Next: 2020 U.S. Championships

The 2019 U.S. Figure Skating Championships were held from January 18–27, 2019, at the Little Caesars Arena in Detroit, Michigan. Medals were awarded in men's singles, women's singles, pair skating, and ice dance at the senior, junior, novice, intermediate, and juvenile levels. The results were part of the U.S. selection criteria for the 2019 Four Continents Championships, 2019 World Junior Championships, and the 2019 World Championships.

Detroit was announced as the host in November 2017.

== Qualifying ==
Competitors qualified at regional and sectional competitions, held from October to November 2018, or earned a bye. The top four finishers in each discipline at sectionals earned a spot at the National Figure Skating Championships. A list of qualified skaters was published on December 13, 2018.

Date	Event	Type	Location	Results
October 3–7, 2018	Upper Great Lakes	Regional	Peoria, Illinois	
October 3–7, 2018	Northwest Pacific	Regional	Sherwood, Oregon	
October 3–7, 2018	South Atlantic	Regional	Coral Springs, Florida	
October 10–14, 2018	Central Pacific	Regional	Vacaville, California	
October 10–14, 2018	Southwestern	Regional	Plano, Texas	
October 10–14, 2018	New England	Regional	Boston, Massachusetts	
October 17–21, 2018	Southwest Pacific	Regional	Anaheim, California	
October 17–21, 2018	North Atlantic	Regional	Lake Placid, New York	
October 17–21, 2018	Eastern Great Lakes	Regional	Ann Arbor, Michigan	
November 13–17, 2018	Eastern	Sectional	Wake Forest, North Carolina	
November 13–17, 2018	Midwestern	Sectional	Fort Wayne, Indiana	
November 13–17, 2018	Pacific Coast	Sectional	Salt Lake City, Utah	
January 18–27, 2019	U.S. Championships	Final	Detroit, Michigan	

== Entries ==
Men	Ladies	Pairs	Ice dance
Andrew Austin	Starr Andrews	Ashley Cain / Timothy LeDuc	Alannah Binotto / Shiloh Judd
Jason Brown	Mariah Bell	Jessica Calalang / Brian Johnson	Christina Carreira / Anthony Ponomarenko
Nathan Chen	Julia Biechler	Winter Deardorff / Max Settlage	Madison Chock / Evan Bates
Timothy Dolensky	Ting Cui	Haven Denney / Brandon Frazier	Lydia Erdman / Yuri Vlasenko
Tomoki Hiwatashi	Amber Glenn	Nica Digerness / Danny Neudecker	Kaitlin Hawayek / Jean-Luc Baker
William Hubbart	Hanna Harrell	Tarah Kayne / Danny O’Shea	Madison Hubbell / Zachary Donohue
Ben Jalovick	Courtney Hicks	Chelsea Liu / Ian Meyh	Karina Manta / Joseph Johnson
Alexander Johnson	Rena Ikenishi	Audrey Lu / Misha Mitrofanov	Lorraine McNamara / Quinn Carpenter
Alexei Krasnozhon	Pooja Kalyan	Alexa Scimeca Knierim / Chris Knierim	Bailey Melton / Ryan O'Donnell
Daniel Kulenkamp	Alysa Liu	Olivia Serafini / Mervin Tran	Rachel Parsons / Michael Parsons
Tony Lu	Emmy Ma	Erika Smith / AJ Reiss	Elicia Reynolds / Stephen Reynolds
Jimmy Ma	Brynne McIsaac	Deanna Stellato-Dudek / Nathan Bartholomay	Nicole Takahashi / Oleg Altukhov
Jordan Moeller	Hannah Miller	Allison Timlen / Justin Highgate-Brutman	
Sebastien Payannet	Heidi Munger		
Camden Pulkinen	Akari Nakahara		
Sean Rabbitt	Bradie Tennell		
Emmanuel Savary	Sierra Venetta		
Kevin Shum	Megan Wessenberg		
Andrew Torgashev			
Vincent Zhou

=== Changes to preliminary entries ===
Date	Discipline	Withdrew	Reason/Other notes	Refs
January 2	Pairs	Jessica Pfund / Joshua Santillan	Injury	
January 4	Ladies	Karen Chen	Injury recovery	
January 9	Ladies	Gracie Gold	Personal	
January 13	Ladies	Angela Wang	Illness & injury	
January 14	Ladies	Ashley Lin		
January 14	Pairs	Sarah Feng / TJ Nyman		

== Schedule ==
The Little Caesars Arena, the home of the Detroit Red Wings which opened in September 2017, will host all junior and senior (Championship) level practices and competitions. The Detroit Skating Club will host all Juvenile, Intermediate and Novice practice sessions and competitions from January 18 – 22, 2019.

Date	Time	Event
January 22	5:30 PM	Junior Ladies and Junior Men Short Program
January 23	10:30 AM	Junior Pairs Short Program
January 23	3:00 PM	Junior Rhythm Dance
January 23	5:30 PM	Junior Ladies and Junior Men Free Skate
January 24	12:00 PM	Junior Pairs Free Skate
January 24	4:00 PM	Senior Pairs Short Program
January 24	7:45 PM	Senior Ladies Short Program
January 25	12:00 PM	Junior Free Dance
January 25	3:45 PM	Senior Rhythm Dance
January 25	6:30 PM	Senior Ladies Free Skate
January 26	9:15 AM	Senior Pairs Free Skate and Senior Men Short Program
January 26	1:15 PM	Senior Pairs Free Skate and Senior Men Short Program
January 26	6:00 PM	Senior Free Dance
January 27	2:00 PM	Senior Men Free Skate
January 27	8:00 PM	Skating Spectacular

== Medal summary ==
=== Senior ===
Discipline	Gold	Silver	Bronze	Pewter
Men	Nathan Chen	Vincent Zhou	Jason Brown	Tomoki Hiwatashi
Women	Alysa Liu	Bradie Tennell	Mariah Bell	Hanna Harrell
Pairs	Ashley Cain; Timothy LeDuc	Haven Denney; Brandon Frazier	Deanna Stellato-Dudek; Nathan Bartholomay	Tarah Kayne; Daniel O'Shea
Ice dance	Madison Hubbell; Zachary Donohue	Madison Chock; Evan Bates	Kaitlin Hawayek; Jean-Luc Baker	Lorraine McNamara; Quinn Carpenter

=== Junior ===
Discipline	Gold	Silver	Bronze	Pewter
Men	Ryan Dunk	Dinh Tran	Joonsoo Kim	Peter Liu
Women	Gabriella Izzo	Audrey Shin	Emilia Murdock	Sarah Jung
Pairs	Laiken Lockley; Keenan Prochnow	Kate Finster; Balázs Nagy	Isabelle Martins; Ryan Bedard	Maria Mokhova; Ivan Mokhov
Ice dance	Caroline Green; Gordon Green	Avonley Nguyen; Vadym Kolesnik	Eliana Gropman; Ian Somerville	Oona Brown; Gage Brown

== Senior results ==
=== Men's singles ===
Rank	Skater	Total	SP		FS	
1st place, gold medalist(s)	Nathan Chen	342.22	1	113.42	1	228.80
2nd place, silver medalist(s)	Vincent Zhou	284.01	3	100.25	2	183.76
3rd place, bronze medalist(s)	Jason Brown	273.08	2	100.52	3	172.56
4	Tomoki Hiwatashi	253.28	4	84.05	4	169.23
5	Alexei Krasnozhon	234.52	5	82.53	5	151.99
6	Timothy Dolensky	228.94	6	81.10	7	147.84
7	Andrew Torgashev	225.97	9	76.95	6	149.02
8	Sean Rabbitt	217.84	7	79.66	9	138.18
9	Alexander Johnson	216.48	11	74.07	8	142.41
10	Jimmy Ma	206.92	10	74.84	11	132.08
11	Emmanuel Savary	202.45	13	69.89	10	132.56
12	Camden Pulkinen	199.87	8	78.39	15	121.48
13	Jordan Moeller	197.82	14	66.15	12	131.67
14	Kevin Shum	196.11	12	71.13	13	124.98
15	Daniel Kulenkamp	188.93	16	64.64	14	124.29
16	William Hubbart	186.02	15	65.34	16	120.68
17	Sebastien Payannet	169.14	17	61.55	18	107.59
18	Ben Jalovick	167.51	19	58.51	17	109.00
19	Tony Lu	144.99	18	59.81	20	85.18
20	Andrew Austin	131.39	20	45.68	19	85.71

=== Women's singles ===
Rank	Skater	Total	SP		FS	
1st place, gold medalist(s)	Alysa Liu	217.51	2	73.89	1	143.62
2nd place, silver medalist(s)	Bradie Tennell	213.59	1	76.60	4	136.99
3rd place, bronze medalist(s)	Mariah Bell	212.40	3	70.30	2	142.10
4	Hanna Harrell	203.11	5	68.16	5	134.95
5	Ting Cui	194.30	12	54.64	3	139.66
6	Megan Wessenberg	182.55	7	60.37	6	122.18
7	Amber Glenn	180.73	4	69.86	8	110.87
8	Starr Andrews	175.70	8	58.66	7	117.04
9	Emmy Ma	174.82	6	65.13	9	109.69
10	Akari Nakahara	166.76	10	57.72	10	109.04
11	Brynne McIsaac	157.34	11	56.46	13	100.88
12	Sierra Venetta	152.93	18	47.77	11	105.16
13	Rena Ikenishi	152.70	16	51.01	12	101.69
14	Heidi Munger	151.85	15	52.37	14	99.48
15	Hannah Miller	148.38	14	52.75	15	95.63
16	Courtney Hicks	145.95	13	53.04	16	92.91
17	Julia Biechler	133.88	17	50.98	17	82.90
WD	Pooja Kalyan	Withdrew	9	58.64	Withdrew from competition	

=== Pairs ===
Rank	Team	Total	SP		FS	
1st place, gold medalist(s)	Ashley Cain; Timothy LeDuc	212.36	2	70.47	1	141.89
2nd place, silver medalist(s)	Haven Denney; Brandon Frazier	201.64	3	68.32	2	133.32
3rd place, bronze medalist(s)	Deanna Stellato-Dudek; Nathan Bartholomay	199.92	4	68.18	3	131.74
4	Tarah Kayne; Daniel O'Shea	198.64	1	71.83	4	126.81
5	Jessica Calalang; Brian Johnson	183.36	6	62.94	5	120.42
6	Audrey Lu; Misha Mitrofanov	182.42	5	66.21	6	116.21
7	Alexa Scimeca Knierim; Chris Knierim	171.42	7	61.56	7	109.86
8	Nica Digerness; Danny Neudecker	163.63	9	58.84	9	104.79
9	Erika Smith; A.J. Reiss	162.52	10	56.25	8	106.27
10	Winter Deardorff; Max Settlage	154.80	12	53.14	10	101.66
11	Chelsea Liu; Ian Meyh	154.69	8	59.44	12	95.25
12	Allison Timlen; Justin Highgate-Brutman	153.12	11	55.27	11	97.85
13	Olivia Serafini; Mervin Tran	137.95	13	51.32	13	86.63

=== Ice dance ===
Rank	Team	Total	RD		FD	
1st place, gold medalist(s)	Madison Hubbell; Zachary Donohue	215.88	1	84.56	1	131.32
2nd place, silver medalist(s)	Madison Chock; Evan Bates	211.52	2	82.33	2	129.19
3rd place, bronze medalist(s)	Kaitlin Hawayek; Jean-Luc Baker	196.95	3	76.77	3	120.18
4	Lorraine McNamara; Quinn Carpenter	191.10	5	74.42	4	116.68
5	Christina Carreira; Anthony Ponomarenko	190.01	4	75.23	5	114.78
6	Rachel Parsons; Michael Parsons	170.26	6	72.52	7	97.74
7	Karina Manta; Joseph Johnson	159.97	7	55.16	6	104.81
8	Lydia Erdman; Yuri Vlasenko	124.92	8	45.99	8	78.93
9	Elicia Reynolds; Stephen Reynolds	111.69	9	39.16	9	72.53
10	Nicole Takahashi; Oleg Altukhov	91.31	12	31.93	10	59.38
11	Alannah Binotto; Shiloh Judd	90.64	11	34.87	11	55.77
12	Bailey Melton; Ryan O'Donnell	88.53	10	36.60	12	51.93

== Junior results ==
=== Junior men ===
Rank	Name	Total points	SP		FS	
1	Ryan Dunk	201.43	2	68.58	1	132.85
2	Dinh Tran	196.03	4	64.84	2	131.19
3	Joonsoo Kim	187.95	1	70.72	4	117.23
4	Peter Liu	182.32	5	64.33	3	117.99
5	Lucas Altieri	172.87	6	60.94	7	111.93
6	Joseph Kang	170.98	11	54.42	5	116.56
7	David Shapiro	166.85	7	57.30	8	109.55
8	Max Lake	165.69	12	52.43	6	113.26
9	Alex Wellman	163.20	9	55.70	9	107.50
10	Eric Sjoberg	161.99	10	55.54	10	106.45
11	Luke Ferrante	161.89	3	65.08	11	96.81
12	Chase Finster	132.25	8	56.27	12	75.98

=== Junior women ===
Rank	Name	Total points	SP		FS	
1	Gabriella Izzo	172.42	1	60.97	2	111.45
2	Audrey Shin	165.61	6	53.03	1	112.58
3	Emilia Murdock	154.48	2	58.15	4	96.33
4	Sarah Jung	150.88	4	56.07	5	94.81
5	Wren Warne-Jacobsen	150.13	7	51.50	3	98.63
6	Emily Zhang	146.64	5	55.46	7	91.18
7	Noelle Rosa	144.91	8	51.33	6	93.58
8	Amie Miyagi	133.58	3	56.25	10	77.33
9	Caitlin Ha	132.68	9	49.31	8	83.37
10	Alyssa Rich	128.02	10	46.53	9	81.49
11	Akane Eguchi	118.56	12	43.36	11	75.20
12	Stephanie Ciarochi	116.53	11	44.47	12	72.06

=== Junior pairs ===
Rank	Name	Total points	SP		FS	
1	Laiken Lockley / Keenan Prochnow	163.35	1	61.52	1	101.83
2	Kate Finster / Balazs Nagy	149.48	2	59.65	2	89.83
3	Isabelle Martins / Ryan Bedard	141.97	3	52.16	3	89.81
4	Maria Mokhova / Ivan Mokhov	136.61	4	48.47	4	88.14
5	Grace Knoop / Blake Eisenach	128.87	5	47.31	5	81.56
6	Ainsley Peterson / Matthew Rounis	124.35	6	44.46	6	79.89
7	Sarah Rose / Jim Garbutt	119.76	8	44.14	7	75.62
8	Evelyn Grace Hanns / Kristofer Ogrens	116.15	7	44.23	8	71.92
9	Cora DeWyre / Jacob Nussle	103.61	9	35.74	9	67.87

=== Junior ice dance ===
Rank	Name	Total points	RD		FD	
1	Caroline Green / Gordon Green	172.54	1	70.82	2	101.72
2	Avonley Nguyen / Vadym Kolesnik	171.06	2	65.92	1	105.14
3	Eliana Gropman / Ian Somerville	155.46	4	62.60	3	92.86
4	Oona Brown / Gage Brown	153.67	3	63.34	4	90.33
5	Molly Cesanek / Yehor Yehorov	144.23	5	58.57	5	85.66
6	Jocelyn Haines / James Koszuta	136.64	7	54.67	6	81.97
7	Ella Ales / Daniel Tsarik	132.24	6	56.99	9	75.25
8	Sophia Elder / Christopher Elder	131.94	8	52.10	7	79.84
9	Katarina Wolfkostin / Howard Zhao	127.63	9	50.07	8	77.56
10	Katarina DelCamp / Maxwell Gart	121.52	11	48.22	10	73.30
11	Alina Efimova / Alexander Petrov	119.73	10	48.89	11	70.84
12	Claire Purnell / Lucas Purnell	108.10	12	41.87	12	66.23
13	Samantha Udell / Garrett Udell	53.96	13	22.37	13	31.59

== International team selections ==
=== World Championships ===
U.S. Figure Skating began announcing the team for the 2019 World Championships on January 26.

	Men	Ladies	Pairs	Ice dancing
	Jason Brown	Mariah Bell	Ashley Cain / Timothy LeDuc	Madison Chock / Evan Bates
	Nathan Chen	Bradie Tennell		Kaitlin Hawayek / Jean-Luc Baker
	Vincent Zhou			Madison Hubbell / Zachary Donohue
1st alt.	Tomoki Hiwatashi	Ting Cui	Tarah Kayne / Danny O'Shea	Lorraine McNamara / Quinn Carpenter
2nd alt.	Alexei Krasnozhon	Megan Wessenberg	Alexa Scimeca Knierim / Chris Knierim	Christina Carreira / Anthony Ponomarenko
3rd alt.	Timothy Dolensky	Starr Andrews	Deanna Stellato-Dudek / Nathan Bartholomay	Rachel Parsons / Michael Parsons

=== Four Continents Championships ===
U.S. Figure Skating began announcing the team for the 2019 Four Continents Championships on January 26.

	Men	Ladies	Pairs	Ice dancing
	Jason Brown	Mariah Bell	Ashley Cain / Timothy LeDuc	Madison Chock / Evan Bates
	Tomoki Hiwatashi	Ting Cui	Haven Denney / Brandon Frazier	Kaitlin Hawayek / Jean-Luc Baker
	Vincent Zhou	Bradie Tennell	Tarah Kayne / Danny O'Shea	Madison Hubbell / Zachary Donohue
1st alt.	Alexei Krasnozhon	Megan Wessenberg	Deanna Stellato-Dudek / Nathan Bartholomay	Lorraine McNamara / Quinn Carpenter
2nd alt.	Timothy Dolensky	Starr Andrews	Alexa Scimeca Knierim / Chris Knierim	Christina Carreira / Anthony Ponomarenko
3rd alt.	Andrew Torgashev	Amber Glenn	Jessica Calalang / Brian Johnson	Rachel Parsons / Michael Parsons

=== World Junior Championships ===
U.S. Figure Skating began announcing entries for the 2019 World Junior Championships team on January 26. The men and ladies will be selected after a training camp. The men and ladies were announced on February 5.

	Men	Ladies	Pairs	Ice dancing
	Tomoki Hiwatashi	Ting Cui	Sarah Feng / TJ Nyman	Caroline Green / Gordon Green
	Alexei Krasnozhon	Hanna Harrell	Kate Finster / Balazs Nagy	Eliana Gropman / Ian Somerville
	Camden Pulkinen		Laiken Lockley / Keenan Prochnow	Avonley Nguyen / Vadym Kolesnik
1st alt.	Andrew Torgashev	Starr Andrews	Chelsea Liu / Ian Meyh	Oona Brown / Gage Brown
2nd alt.	Ryan Dunk	Gabriella Izzo	Grace Knoop / Blake Eisenach	Jocelyn Haines / James Koszuta
3rd alt.	Dinh Tran	Audrey Shin		Ella Ales / Daniel Tsarik
