= Hanna Harrell =

American figure skater

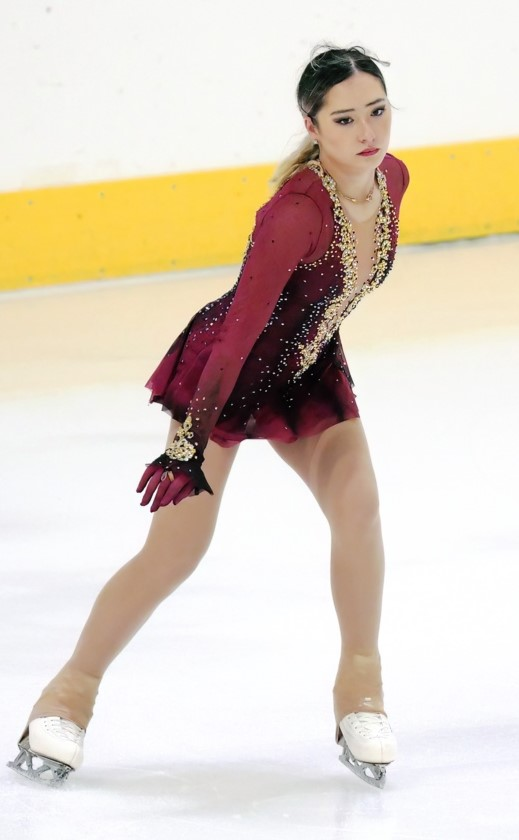
- Harrell during her free skate at the 2022 CS Lombardia Trophy

Personal information
- Born: September 26, 2003 (age 23) Russellville, Arkansas, U.S.
- Home town: Anaheim, California, U.S.
- Height: 5 ft 0 in (1.52 m)

Figure skating career
- Country: United States
- Coach: Misha Ge
- Skating club: SC of Boston

Hanna Harrell (born September 26, 2003) is an American figure skater.

Harrell competed in US Championships at the juvenile level in 2016 where she won the silver medal, at the junior level in 2018 where she placed fourth, and at the senior level in 2019 where she placed fourth at just 15 years old, leading to her selection for the World Junior Championships where she finished 7th.

Harrell also competed at the senior level in the US Championships in 2021-2023.

== Figure skating career ==
=== Early years ===
Harrell began learning to skate as a three-year-old at the Diamond Edge Figure Skating Club in Little Rock, Arkansas. At age 7, she relocated for training to Dallas, Texas, where she was coached by former Olympian Natalia Mishkutionok for one year before training with prominent figure skating coaches Olga Ganicheva and Aleksey Letov.

=== 2015–2016 season ===
At the 2016 U.S. Championships, Harrell won the juvenile silver medal (behind Stephanie Ciarochi).

=== 2017–2018 season ===
In the 2017–2018 season, she debuted in the ISU Junior Grand Prix series.

At the 2018 U.S. Championships she won the junior pewter (i.e. fourth place) medal behind Alysa Liu, Pooja Kalyan and Ting Cui.

=== 2018–2019 season ===
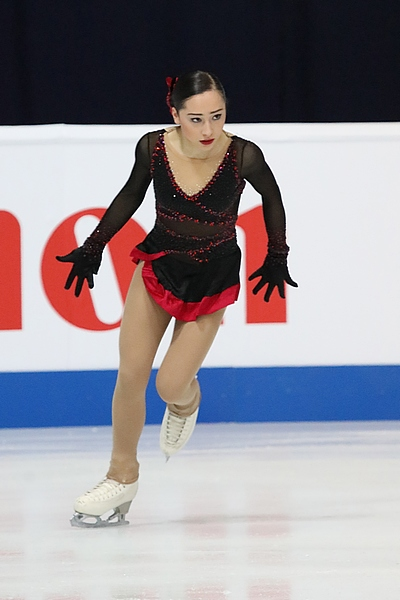
Harrell at the 2019 World Junior Championships

Harrell was diagnosed with a foot injury in late August 2018. She wore a protective boot for more than a month and was off the ice completely for two to three weeks. She stated, "I had a bad injury on my foot, and I had two stress reactions, and they were almost fractured".

In October, Harrell placed seventh at her JGP assignment in Yerevan, Armenia.

In January, at the 2019 U.S. Championships, she surprisingly won the senior pewter medal at the age of 15 (behind Alysa Liu, Bradie Tennell and Mariah Bell).

In March, she (along with Ting Cui) represented the United States at the 2019 World Junior Championships in Zagreb, Croatia. Ranked fifth in the short, she competed in the final group during the free skate. She finished seventh overall after placing ninth in the free skate.

=== 2019–2020 season ===
Harrell opened the season at the Philadelphia Summer International, where she won the bronze medal. Given two Junior Grand Prix assignments, she placed seventh at the 2019 JGP France. Harrell had to withdraw from the 2019 JGP Italy due to a stress fracture in her foot that was repeatedly misdiagnosed. Harrell's injury subsequently forced her to withdraw from the rest of the season, including her place on the American team to the 2020 Winter Youth Olympics in Lausanne, Switzerland.

=== 2020–2021 season ===
Harrell returned to competition at the 2021 U.S. Championships, where she placed seventeenth out of seventeen skaters.

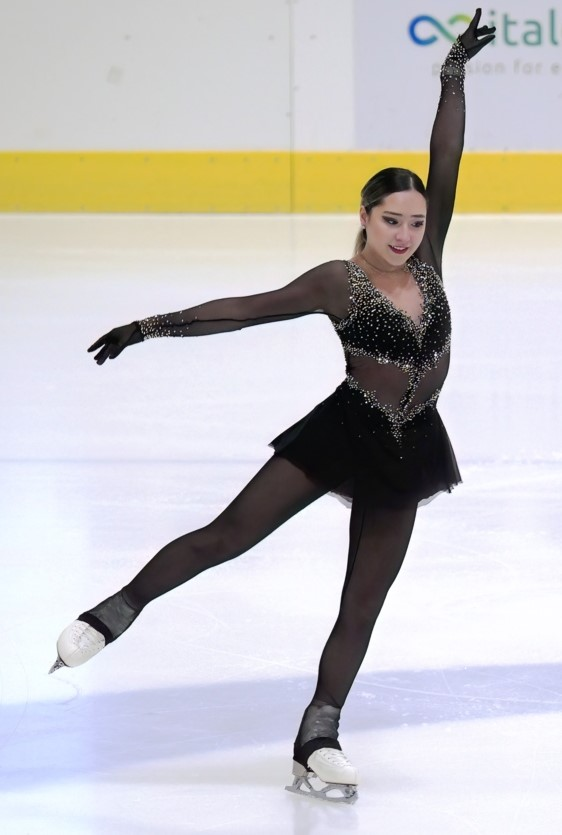
Harrell during her short program at the 2022 CS Lombardia Trophy

=== 2021–2022 season ===
Harrell began the season making her Challenger series debut at the 2021 CS Golden Spin of Zagreb, finishing seventh. She went on to place eighth at the 2022 U.S. Championships.

=== 2022–2023 season ===
Harrell began the 2022-23 figure skating season with a twelfth-place finish at 2022 Cranberry Cup International and fifth-place finish at the 2022 Lombardia Trophy.

She qualified a spot for the 2023 U.S. Championships after winning silver at the 2023 Pacific Coast Sectional Championships. At the U.S. National Championships, Harrell fell twice during her short program which landed her in eighteenth place out of the eighteen skaters competing and withdrew before the free skate.

== Personal life ==
Harrell was born on September 26, 2003, in Russellville, Arkansas, of Japanese descent on her mother's side. Harrell also competed in artistic gymnastics up through Level 7. She is now a student at the University of California, Berkeley and is a member of the Upsilon chapter of Zeta Tau Alpha.

== Programs ==
| Season | Short program | Free skating | Exhibition |
|---|---|---|---|
| 2023–2024 | Malagueña (Electro) by Ernesto Lecuona choreo. by Misha Ge | Adagio in G minor (Epic) by Tomaso Albinoni choreo. by Misha Ge | |
| 2022–2023 | Violin Concerto No. 2 by Felix Mendelssohn choreo. by Misha Ge | Nessun dorma (from Turandot) by Giacomo Puccini choreo. by Misha Ge | |
| 2021-2022 | Liebesträume by Franz Liszt choreo. by Misha Ge | Nessun dorma (from Turandot) by Giacomo Puccini choreo. by Misha Ge | |
| 2019–2021 | Carmen's Story by Édith Piaf; Tanguera choreo. by Misha Ge | Rhapsody on a Theme of Paganini by Sergei Rachmaninoff choreo. by Misha Ge | |
| 2018–2019 | Bla Bla Bla Cha Cha Cha by Petty Booka choreo. by Olga Ganicheva | Tango choreo. by Olga Ganicheva | |
| 2017–2018 | Dark Eyes performed by 101 Strings choreo. by Olga Ganicheva | Mambo Mix by Pérez Prado choreo. by Olga Ganicheva | |
| 2016–2017 | Conga by Miami Sound Machine | Carmen by Georges Bizet | |
| 2015–2016 | | Two Guitars by Paul Mauriat | |

== Competitive highlights ==
CS: Challenger Series; JGP: Junior Grand Prix

International
| Event | 17–18 | 18–19 | 19–20 | 20–21 | 21–22 | 22–23 |
|---|---|---|---|---|---|---|
| CS Golden Spin | | | WD | | 7th | |
| CS Lombardia | | | | | | 5th |
| Cranberry Cup | | | | | | 12th |
| Philadelphia | | | 3rd | | | |
International: Junior
| Junior Worlds | | 7th | | | | |
| JGP Armenia | | 7th | | | | |
| JGP France | | | 7th | | | |
| Asian Open | 5th | | | | | |
| Egna Trophy | 2nd | | | | | |
National
| U.S. Championships | 4th J | 4th | WD | 17th | 8th | WD |
