= Ryan Dunk =

American figure skater (born 2000)

Personal information
- Born: October 14, 2000 (age 25) Baltimore, Maryland, U.S.
- Home town: Boston, Massachusetts, U.S.
- Height: 5 ft 10 in (1.77 m)

Figure skating career
- Country: United States
- Discipline: Men's singles
- Began skating: 2009
- Retired: April 5, 2022

Ryan Dunk (born October 14, 2000) is a retired American competitive figure skater. He is the 2019 U.S. Junior National gold medalist and the 2019 Asian Open Trophy bronze medalist.

== Personal life ==
Dunk began skating in 2009 after his mother brought him to a rink and he participated in a group lesson.

In an Instagram post on October 14, 2021, Ryan Dunk came out as gay.

== Career ==
=== 2018–19 season ===
Dunk began his season by competing in the 2018 JGP series. At the 2018 JGP Slovakia, he placed sixth, while he placed fifth at the 2018 JGP Armenia.

Dunk won his first junior national title in 2019 with 68.58 in the short program, 132.85 in the free skate, and 201.43 overall. He made his international senior debut at the 2019 International Challenge Cup, where he finished in fifth place.

In 2018, Dunk moved to Boston to train with Peter Johansson and Mark Mitchell.

=== 2019–20 season ===
Returning to the Junior Grand Prix, Dunk finished fifth at the 2019 JGP United States and sixth at the 2019 JGP Poland. Making his senior international debut at the ISU Challenger series, he won the bronze medal at the 2019 Asian Open Trophy. He then appeared at the 2020 U.S. Championships, where he finished eleventh.

=== 2020–21 season ===
During the pandemic-limited season, Dunk's lone competition appearance was at the 2021 U.S. Championships, where he finished in eleventh place.

=== 2021–22 season ===
Dunk finished ninth at the 2022 U.S. Championships.

On April 5, an article announced that Dunk had retired from competition.

== Programs ==
Season	Short program	Free skate	Ref.
2018–19	"Illumination" By Jennifer Thomas Choreo. by Colin McManus	La La Land By Justin Hurwitz Choreo. by Colin McManus	
2019–20	"The Blower's Daughter" By Chris Mann Performed by Christina Aguilera	"Io ci sarò" By Andrea Bocelli	

== Competitive highlights ==
- CS – Event of the ISU Challenger Series
- JGP – Event of the ISU Junior Grand Prix Series

Competition placements at junior level
Season	2016–17	2017–18	2018–19	2019–20
U.S. Championships	3rd	4th	1st	
JGP Armenia			5th	
JGP Austria		9th		
JGP Poland				6th
JGP Slovakia			6th	
JGP United States				5th
Philadelphia Summer		1st		

Competition placements at senior level
Season	2018–19	2019–20	2020–21	2021–22
U.S. Championships		11th	14th	9th
CS Asian Open Trophy		3rd		
Challenge Cup	5th			

== Detailed results ==
ISU personal best scores in the +5/-5 GOE System
Segment	Type	Score	Event
Total	TSS	205.90	2019 JGP Poland
Short program	TSS	72.90	2019 JGP Poland
Short program	TES	39.19	2019 JGP Poland
Short program	PCS	34.95	2019 CS Asian Open Trophy
Free skating	TSS	133.00	2019 JGP Poland
Free skating	TES	65.32	2019 JGP Poland
Free skating	PCS	69.20	2019 CS Asian Open Trophy

ISU personal best scores in the +3/-3 GOE System
Segment	Type	Score	Event
Total	TSS	170.71	2017 JGP Austria
Short program	TSS	60.85	2017 JGP Austria
Short program	TES	32.25	2017 JGP Austria
Short program	PCS	28.60	2017 JGP Austria
Free skating	TSS	109.86	2017 JGP Austria
Free skating	TES	50.56	2017 JGP Austria
Free skating	PCS	59.30	2017 JGP Austria

- At national events in the United States, pewter medals are awarded for fourth place.

=== Senior level ===
Results in the 2018–19 season
Date	Event	SP		FS		Total	
Date	Event	P	Score	P	Score	P	Score
Feb 21–24, 2019	(Netherlands) 2019 International Challenge Cup	7	65.36	5	128.59	5	193.95

Results in the 2019–20 season
Date	Event	SP		FS		Total	
Date	Event	P	Score	P	Score	P	Score
Oct 30 – Nov 3, 2019	(China) 2019 CS Asian Open Trophy	4	71.56	3	127.47	3	199.03
Jan 20–26, 2020	(United States) 2020 U.S. Championships	14	67.15	11	132.30	11	199.45

Results in the 2020–21 season
Date	Event	SP		FS		Total	
Date	Event	P	Score	P	Score	P	Score
Jan 11–21, 2021	(United States) 2021 U.S. Championships	14	65.60	13	127.06	14	192.66

Results in the 2021–22 season
Date	Event	SP		FS		Total	
Date	Event	P	Score	P	Score	P	Score
Jan 3–9, 2022	(United States) 2022 U.S. Championships	11	65.66	9	125.70	9	191.36

=== Junior level ===
Results in the 2016–17 season
Date	Event	SP		FS		Total	
Date	Event	P	Score	P	Score	P	Score
Jan 14–22, 2017	(United States) 2017 U.S. Championships (Junior)	4	57.78	3	114.44	3	172.22

Results in the 2017–18 season
Date	Event	SP		FS		Total	
Date	Event	P	Score	P	Score	P	Score
Aug 3–5, 2017	(United States) 2017 Philadelphia Summer International	1	60.60	1	117.92	1	178.52
Aug 23–26, 2017	2017 JGP Austria	5	60.85	12	109.86	9	170.71
Dec 29, 2017 – Jan 8, 2018	(United States) 2018 U.S. Championships (Junior)	10	53.43	3	119.25	4	172.68

Results in the 2018–19 season
Date	Event	SP		FS		Total	
Date	Event	P	Score	P	Score	P	Score
Aug 22–25, 2018	2018 JGP Slovakia	6	63.08	6	125.83	6	188.91
Oct 10–13, 2018	2018 JGP Armenia	4	68.45	6	126.85	5	195.30
Jan 19–27, 2019	(United States) 2019 U.S. Championships (Junior)	2	68.58	1	132.85	1	201.43

Results in the 2019–20 season
Date	Event	SP		FS		Total	
Date	Event	P	Score	P	Score	P	Score
Aug 28–31, 2019	2019 JGP United States	6	63.89	6	124.50	5	188.39
Sep 18–21, 2019	2019 JGP Poland	5	72.90	6	133.00	6	205.90
