= Selma Ihr =

Swedish figure skater

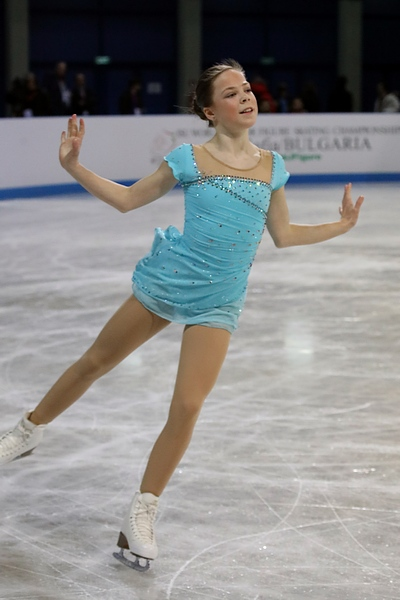

Personal information
- Born: 23 February 2004 (age 22) Danderyd, Sweden
- Home town: Vaxholm
- Height: 1.59 m (5 ft 2 1/2 in)

Figure skating career
- Country: Sweden
- Began skating: 2007

Selma Ihr (born 23 February 2004) is a Swedish figure skater. She is the 2018 Swedish junior national champion and competed in the final segment at the 2018 World Junior Championships.

== Personal life ==
Ihr was born on 23 February 2004 in Danderyd Municipality, Stockholm County, Sweden to Ida and Peter Ihr. She has an older brother named Hugo and a younger brother named Tore. The family lives in Vaxholm and owns multiple pets, including seven rabbits and two dogs. In addition to skating, Ihr also trains in dance.

== Career ==
=== Early career ===
Ihr started skating at age three after following her older brother, a hockey player, to the ice rink. Earlier in her career, she trained under Viacheslav Chiliy. Ihr later moved to Cecilia Willberg at the Föreningen Solna Konståkning in Solna. She has been a member of the Swedish national team since August 2016.

Ihr began competing internationally from a young age and won several medals on the advanced novice level, including titles at the 2015 Volvo Open Cup, the 2015 and 2016 Nordics Open, the 2016 NRW Trophy, and the 2016 Mentor Toruń Cup. She also won multiple national titles on the novice level in the U13 and U15 categories.

=== 2017–2018 season ===
Ihr made her junior international debut on the 2017–18 ISU Junior Grand Prix, earning an 11th-place finish in Brisbane, Australia and a ninth-place finish in Minsk, Belarus. At the 2018 Swedish Championships in December, she won her first junior national title over Smilla Szalkai and Jelizaveta Kopaca by nearly 13 points. Ihr competed the following month at the 2018 Bavarian Open and finished fourth. As a result, she was named to the 2018 World Junior Championships alongside men's skater Gabriel Folkesson and pairs team Greta Crafoord / John Crafoord. At Junior Worlds, where Ihr was one of the youngest skaters, she placed 14th in both segments with personal bests to finish 14th overall. During the offseason, Ihr trained with Peter Johansson and Mark Mitchell in Boston for a month.

=== 2018–2019 season ===
Ihr again opened her season on the Junior Grand Prix, placing eighth at both 2018 JGP Czech Republic and 2018 JGP Slovenia. She did not compete at the 2019 Swedish Championships, but was nevertheless named to the teams for the 2019 European Youth Olympic Festival and the 2019 World Junior Championships based on her strong early season results. However, the injury that kept her out of Swedish Championships eventually caused her to withdraw from both events. Ihr again spent part of the offseason training with Johansson and Mitchell.

=== Abusive coaching allegations ===
Ihr left Willberg and the Solna SC in September 2019 after alleging that she engaged in mental abuse, verbal abuse, body shaming, and overtraining resulting in exacerbated injuries. She was the sixth Swedish national team member to leave the club in recent years, following Matilda Algotsson, Illya Solomin, Alessia Hägg, Lisa Lager, and Natran Tzagai. Ihr believes her situation is part of a widespread cultural problem in Swedish figure skating, where multiple coaches within the Swedish Figure Skating Association engage in such behavior without facing repercussions; Peter Nordahl, chairman of the Stockholm Figure Skating Association, has agreed with Ihr's assessment of the "culture of silence".

"For me, it is important that she was convicted, both for mental abuse and weight shaming. But I find it very strange that the suspension did not last longer. That means she can work with children again, is that really right? Does the Swedish Figure Skating Association want to expose more children to what I have been exposed to?"

"Of course I'm disappointed, it does not feel like anyone is listening. Why did RIN not listen to all the skaters we called as witnesses, who can talk about what they saw the coach expose me to? Why should unions and coaches be protected when it is we children who should be protected?"

— Selma Ihr

Ihr recalled that she was required to report her weight daily to her coach and that she often called skaters "ugly" and made disparaging comments about skaters' mistakes in practice. She alleged that at a Junior Grand Prix event in 2018, Willberg mentioned that "most skaters here have eating disorders" and encouraged Ihr to throw up her food to lose weight; Ihr recalled that it was one of the times where she stood up for herself, stating that even if she bought a scale and her weight inevitably went up as she aged, she would not throw up her food. Ihr also discussed how her coach did not follow a physical therapist's recommended training plan for her to manage a back injury, forcing her to jump earlier than allowed and resulting in greater pain.

After the Swedish Figure Skating Association received Ihr's report on Willberg's misconduct in September 2019, the federation's ethics and discipline committee convicted Willberg of mental abuse and weight shaming in March 2020 following a recommendation from the Swedish Sports Confederation; Solna SC had suspended Willberg and removed her from club activities since October 2019. The club itself was investigated in October as well by the City of Solna's leisure administration, but eventually not punished. No further discipline was expected for Willberg despite her violation of the federation's code of conduct and the board's conclusion that she was "indifferent to the effects of her treatment [on young skaters]." However, upon appeal, the National Sports Board (RIN) acquitted Willberg in June 2020, noting that while "the skater [Ihr] appears credible," the accusations in the report are not sufficiently specified and that "in an overall assessment of the investigation presented in the case, it cannot be considered beyond a reasonable doubt that the coach conducted herself in the insulting and improper manner alleged in the report." Both Ihr and her mother Ida expressed disappointment with the decision and called it irresponsible to let Willberg work with children again.

Ihr has not competed internationally or domestically since her injury in 2018, although she has not officially announced retirement.

== Programs ==
Season	Short program	Free skating
2019–2020	Sing, Sing, Sing (with a Swing) by Louis Prima choreo. by Jamie Isley	One Moment in Time performed by Vanessa-Mae choreo. by Cecilia Willberg
2018–2019	Sing, Sing, Sing (with a Swing) by Louis Prima choreo. by Jamie Isley	Pas de Deux (from The Nutcracker) by Pyotr Ilyich Tchaikovsky choreo. by Cecilia Willberg
2017–2018	Over the Rainbow (from The Wizard of Oz) by Harold Arlen, Andrew Lloyd Webber performed by Danielle Hope choreo. by Cecilia Willberg	Pas de Deux (from The Nutcracker) by Pyotr Ilyich Tchaikovsky choreo. by Cecilia Willberg

== Competitive highlights ==
JGP: Junior Grand Prix

International: Junior
Event	14–15	15–16	16–17	17–18	18–19
Junior Worlds				14th	WD
JGP Australia				11th	
JGP Belarus				9th	
JGP Czech Rep.					8th
JGP Slovenia					8th
EYOF					WD
Bavarian Open				4th	
International: Advanced novice
Gardena Spring	7th				
Golden Bear			5th		
Lombardia		4th			
Nordics Open		1st	1st		
NRW Trophy	9th	9th	1st		
Printemps	5th	4th			
Toruń Cup		2nd	1st		
Volvo Open Cup		1st			
National
Swedish Champ.	1st N^{1}	1st N^{1}	1st N^{2}	1st J	WD
WD = Withdrew; Levels: J = Junior; N^{1} = Novice U13; N^{2} = Novice U15
