= Anna Kuzmenko =

Russian-born figure skater (born 2004)

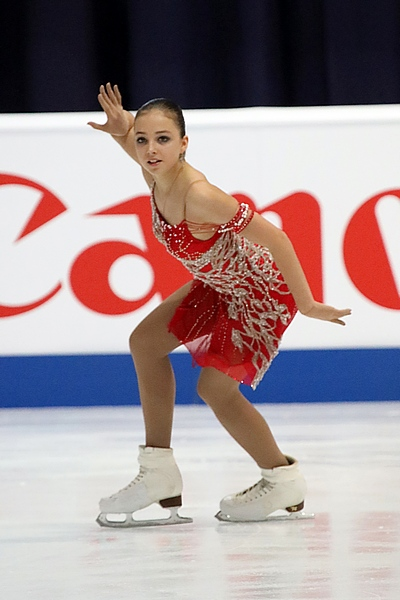
- Kuzmenko at 2019 Junior Worlds

Personal information
- Native name: Анна Александровна Кузьменко
- Full name: Anna Alexandrovna Kuzmenko
- Born: 27 February 2004 (age 22) Moscow, Russia
- Home town: Paris, France
- Height: 1.61 m (5 ft 3 1/2 in)

Figure skating career
- Country: France
- Coach: Svetlana Panova, Tatiana Moiseeva
- Skating club: Club France
- Began skating: 2008

Anna Alexandrovna Kuzmenko (Russian: Анна Александровна Кузьменко, born 27 February 2004) is a Russian-born figure skater who competes for France. She is the 2019 French junior national champion and represented the country at the 2019 World Junior Championships, advancing to the free skate and finishing 15th overall.

== Career ==
=== 2018–2019 season ===
In the 2018–2019 season, she debuted in the ISU Junior Grand Prix series.

At the 2019 French Championships, Kuzmenko won the junior gold medal.

In March 2019, she represented France at the 2019 World Junior Championships in Zagreb, Croatia. Ranked 7th in the short, she vaulted into the penultimate (second-to-last) group for the free skate, where she placed only 18th, falling to 15th overall.

== Programs ==
Season	Short program	Free skating
2018–2019	Dancing in the Dark (from The Band Wagon) by Arthur Schwartz and Howard Dietz; I Won't Dance by Jerome Kern performed by Fred Astaire choreo. by Nadezhda Kanaeva	Seven Nation Army by The White Stripes performed by Postmodern Jukebox ft. Haley Reinhart; Ain't No Other Man by Christina Aguilera choreo. by Romain Gazave

== Competitive highlights ==
=== For France ===
JGP: Junior Grand Prix

International: Junior
Event	18–19	19–20
Junior Worlds	15th	
JGP Armenia	8th	
JGP Austria	6th	
JGP France		WD
JGP Poland		WD
Golden Bear	7th	
National
French Champ.	1st J	
Master's de Patinage	1st J	
Levels: J = Junior; WD = Withdrew, TBD = Assigned

== Detailed results ==
=== Junior level ===
2018–19 season
Date	Event	Level	SP	FS	Total
4–10 March 2019	2019 Junior Worlds	Junior	7; 59.20	18; 88.66	15; 147.86
22–24 February 2019	2019 French Junior Championships	Junior	1; 58.94	2; 93.51	1; 152.45
25–28 October 2018	2018 Golden Bear of Zagreb	Junior	6; 53.79	7; 93.74	7; 147.53
10–13 October 2018	2018 JGP Armenia	Junior	9; 48.67	7; 104.19	8; 152.86
25–27 September 2018	2018 Master's de Patinage	Junior	1; 45.66	1; 96.24	1; 141.90
29 Aug. – 1 Sept. 2018	2018 JGP Austria	Junior	4; 54.55	7; 96.36	6; 150.91
