= Ting Cui =

American figure skater (born 2002)

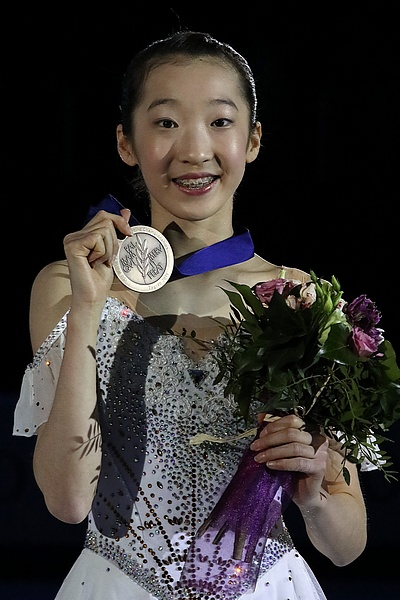
- Cui at the 2019 World Junior Championships

Personal information
- Born: September 6, 2002 (age 24) Baltimore, Maryland, U.S.
- Height: 5 ft 7 in (1.70 m)

Figure skating career
- Country: United States
- Discipline: Women's singles
- Coach: Tom Zakrajsek
- Skating club: Baltimore Figure Skating Club
- Began skating: 2009

Medal record
World Junior Championships
Bronze medal – third place	2019 Zagreb	Singles

Ting Cui (/tsweɪ/; born September 6, 2002) is an American figure skater. She is the 2018 CS Tallinn Trophy silver medalist. At the junior level, she is the 2019 World Junior bronze medalist and the 2018 U.S. junior national bronze medalist.

== Personal life ==
Ting Cui was born on September 6, 2002, in Baltimore, Maryland, the eldest child of Lily and Larry Cui. She graduated from Towson High School in 2020. She enrolled at Middlebury College in 2022, where she currently in the process of obtaining a bachelor's degree in Political Science and Government.

== Career ==
=== Early years ===
Cui began learning to skate in 2009. She received a pewter medal after finishing fourth in the intermediate category at the 2015 U.S. Championships. Two years later, she won silver in the novice ranks at the 2017 U.S. Championships.

=== 2017–18 season ===
Cui made her ISU Junior Grand Prix (JGP) debut in August, placing sixth in Brisbane, Australia. In January, she won the junior bronze medal at the 2018 U.S. Championships, having finished third behind Alysa Liu and Pooja Kalyan after placing eleventh in the short and second in the free. She placed seventh at the 2018 World Junior Championships in Sofia, Bulgaria. She was coached by Vincent Restencourt in Aston, Pennsylvania, until the end of the season. In June, she joined Tom Zakrajsek in Colorado Springs, Colorado.

=== 2018–19 season: World Junior bronze ===
Cui began her season on the JGP series, placing fifth in Linz, Austria, and then seventh in Ostrava, Czech Republic. Making her senior international debut, she won silver at the 2018 CS Tallinn Trophy in November.

At the 2019 U.S. Championships, Cui debuted on the senior level domestically. She placed twelfth in the short program after falling twice and failing to execute a combination. She rallied in the free skate, where she placed third, rising to fifth place overall. Cui said afterward that it "felt amazing, and the audience was so different from juniors. I could feel the energy from the crowd, and I was just so happy, and people were on their feet too, which was really amazing." Cui was then assigned to the 2019 World Junior Championships alongside pewter medalist Hanna Harrell. Because both Harrell and gold medalist Alysa Liu were ineligible for senior international competition, Cui was also assigned to the 2019 Four Continents Championship.

Competing at Four Continents, Cui placed seventh in the short program. Despite an edge call on her flip, she said it was "so much fun skating for the crowd, especially during my footwork, that was great. It’s my first Championship event, and I really want to enjoy every moment of it." In the free program, she fell three times and finished in eleventh place overall.

She won the bronze medal at the 2019 World Junior Championships after placing third in both segments, becoming the first American lady to medal at Junior Worlds since Gracie Gold in 2012.

=== 2019–20 season ===
Cui suffered from a serious ankle injury over the summer but returned to compete at the 2019 U.S. Classic, where she finished fourth. On October 9, 2019, Cui announced that she had reinjured her ankle in training and would consequently withdraw from her Grand Prix assignments for the year, the Internationaux de France and NHK Trophy.

In January, Cui qualified for the 2020 U.S. Championships but withdrew in December 2019 to focus on recovering from her ankle injury.

=== 2020–21 season ===
Cui switched coaches from Tom Zakrajsek to Natalia Linichuk in Newark, Delaware during the offseason. She did not compete at either 2020 Skate America or the 2021 U.S. Championships. Cui struggled with continuing ankle issues and developed an eating disorder that hampered her recovery, though a skating friend helped her to begin improving her mental health.

While appearing on Polina Edmunds's podcast, on an episode that was released in February 2021, Cui said she was training in Lake Placid, New York, with Paul Wylie and was still recovering from her injury. She said she was working on getting her triples consistent and looking to return and compete for the next season. Cui also said her coaching situation for the upcoming season would be dependent upon several factors, including where she decided to attend college. Roland Burghart would eventually become her new coach.

During the following season, Cui would only appear at small domestic events. She considered ending her competitive career after she entered college, but she continued to skate for fun and eventually decided to return to competitive training.

=== 2022–23 season ===
Competing at the 2023 Eastern Sectional Championships in early November, Cui would win the silver medal, which allowed her to qualify for the U.S. Championships.

Although assigned to compete at the 2023 Winter World University Games, she would withdraw following a nineteenth-place short program due to illness. Shortly following the event, Cui competed at the 2023 U.S. Championships, where she finished in twelfth place.

=== 2023–24 season ===
Competing at the 2024 Eastern Sectional Championships, Cui won the bronze medal.

=== 2024–25 season ===
During the summer, Tatiana Malinina and Roman Skorniakov became her head coaches; due to the distance between their rink and Cui's college, they coached her virtually when she was at school.

Cui began the season by competing at the 2025 Eastern Sectional Championships, where she won the gold medal, thus qualifying for the 2025 U.S. Championships. She ultimately placed seventeenth at the latter event.

In May 2025, she underwent surgery to treat a longtime ankle injury.

== Programs ==
Season	Short program	Free skating	Exhibition
2016–2017	Defend the Yellow River by Lang Lang	The Wizard of Oz by Harold Arlen	
2017–2018	Libertango by Astor Piazzolla choreo. by Derrick Delmore	Chopin Medley; Selection by Edvin Marton choreo. by Derrick Delmore	Skinny Love by Justin Vernon performed by Birdy
2018–2019	Rhapsody on a Theme of Paganini by Sergei Rachmaninoff choreo. by Derrick Delmore	Giselle by Adolphe Adam choreo. by Derrick Delmore	All I Ask by Adele
2019–2020	Rhapsody on a Theme of Paganini by Sergei Rachmaninoff choreo. by Derrick Delmore	Wayward Sisters; Table for Two (from Nocturnal Animals) by Abel Korzeniowski; La belle histoire d'amour performed by Patricia Kaas choreo. by Katherine Hill	
2020–2021	This Bitter Earth by Dinah Washington, Max Richter choreo. by Colin McManus	Wayward Sisters; Table for Two (from Nocturnal Animals) by Abel Korzeniowski; La belle histoire d'amour performed by Patricia Kaas choreo. by Katherine Hill	
2021–2022	This Bitter Earth by Dinah Washington, Max Richter choreo. by Colin McManus	Wayward Sisters; Table for Two (from Nocturnal Animals) by Abel Korzeniowski; La belle histoire d'amour performed by Patricia Kaas choreo. by Katherine Hill	
2022–2023	Orchestra Suite Part 1 (from Mission: Impossible 2) by Hans Zimmer		
2023–2024	Orchestra Suite Part 1 (from Mission: Impossible 2) by Hans Zimmer		Can't Help Falling in Love by Elvis Presley performed by Tommee Profitt
2024–2025	Black Magic Woman by Fleetwood Mac performed by Santana	Star Wars; The Force Theme by Samuel Kim; Jyn Erso & Hope Suite by Michael Giacchino; Duel of the Fates (Epic Version) by Samuel Kim	

== Competitive highlights ==
- JGP – Event of the ISU Junior Grand Prix Series
- CS – Event of the ISU Challenger Series
- WD – Withdrew from competition

Competition placements at senior level
Season	2018–19	2019–20	2022–23	2023–24	2024–25
Four Continents Championships	11th				
U.S. Championships	5th		12th		17th
CS Tallinn Trophy	2nd				
CS U.S. Classic		4th			
Kings Cup				WD	
Winter University Games			WD		

Competition placements at junior level
Season	2017–18	2018–19
World Junior Championships	7th	3rd
U.S. Championships	3rd	
JGP Australia	6th	
JGP Austria		5th
JGP Czech Republic		7th
Philadelphia Summer	1st	

== Detailed results ==
ISU personal best scores in the +5/-5 GOE System
Segment	Type	Score	Event
Total	TSS	199.79	2018 CS Tallinn Trophy
Short program	TSS	70.20	2018 JGP Czech Republic
Short program	TES	40.43	2018 JGP Czech Republic
Short program	PCS	30.96	2018 CS Tallinn Trophy
Free skating	TSS	132.23	2018 CS Tallinn Trophy
Free skating	TES	72.11	2018 CS Tallinn Trophy
Free skating	PCS	61.84	2019 CS U.S. International Classic

ISU personal best scores in the +3/-3 GOE System
Segment	Type	Score	Event
Total	TSS	180.39	2018 World Junior Championships
Short program	TSS	62.22	2018 World Junior Championships
Short program	TES	36.33	2018 World Junior Championships
Short program	PCS	25.89	2018 World Junior Championships
Free skating	TSS	118.17	2018 World Junior Championships
Free skating	TES	65.16	2018 World Junior Championships
Free skating	PCS	54.01	2018 World Junior Championships

- Small medals for the short program and free skating are only awarded at ISU Championships.

=== Senior level ===
Results in the 2018–19 season
Date	Event	SP		FS		Total	
Date	Event	P	Score	P	Score	P	Score
Nov 26 – Dec 2, 2018	(Estonia) 2018 CS Tallinn Trophy	2	67.56	2	132.23	2	199.79
Jan 19–27, 2019	(United States) 2019 U.S. Championships	12	54.64	3	139.66	5	194.30
Feb 7–10, 2019	(United States) 2019 Four Continents Championships	7	66.73	14	98.11	11	164.84

Results in the 2019–20 season
Date	Event	SP		FS		Total	
Date	Event	P	Score	P	Score	P	Score
Sep 17–22, 2019	(United States) 2019 CS U.S. International Classic	3	63.10	4	114.37	4	177.47

Results in the 2022–23 season
Date	Event	SP		FS		Total	
Date	Event	P	Score	P	Score	P	Score
Jan 13–15, 2022	(United States) 2023 Winter World University Games	19	47.33	—N/a	—N/a	–	WD
Jan 23–29, 2023	(United States) 2023 U.S. Championships	10	57.11	12	104.16	12	161.27

Results in the 2023–24 season
Date	Event	SP		FS		Total	
Date	Event	P	Score	P	Score	P	Score
Oct 5–7, 2023	(United States) 2023 Kings Cup International	3	55.72	—N/a	—N/a	–	WD

Results in the 2024–25 season
Date	Event	SP		FS		Total	
Date	Event	P	Score	P	Score	P	Score
Jan 20–26, 2025	(United States) 2025 U.S. Championships	18	43.94	17	82.69	17	126.63

=== Junior level ===
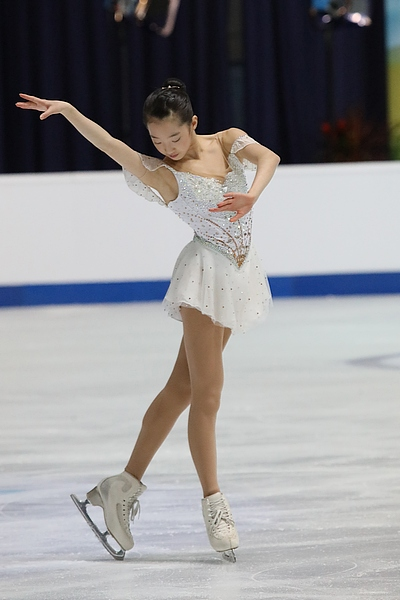
Cui at the 2019 World Junior Championships

Results in the 2017–18 season
Date	Event	SP		FS		Total	
Date	Event	P	Score	P	Score	P	Score
Aug 3–6, 2017	(United States) 2017 Philadelphia Summer International	1	54.01	1	97.78	1	151.79
Aug 23–26, 2017	2017 JGP Australia	5	55.34	7	95.61	6	150.95
Dec 29, 2017 – Jan 8, 2018	(United States) 2018 U.S. Championships (Junior)	11	45.55	2	119.96	3	165.51
Mar 5–11, 2018	(Bulgaria) 2018 World Junior Championships	7	62.22	7	118.17	7	180.39

Results in the 2018–19 season
Date	Event	SP		FS		Total	
Date	Event	P	Score	P	Score	P	Score
Aug 29 – Sep 1, 2018	2018 JGP Austria	6	53.25	5	102.79	5	156.04
Sep 26–29, 2018	2018 JGP Czech Republic	2	70.20	7	102.54	7	172.74
Mar 4–10, 2019	(Croatia) 2019 World Junior Championships	3	67.69	3	126.72	3	194.41
