= Tomoki Hiwatashi =

American figure skater (born 2000)

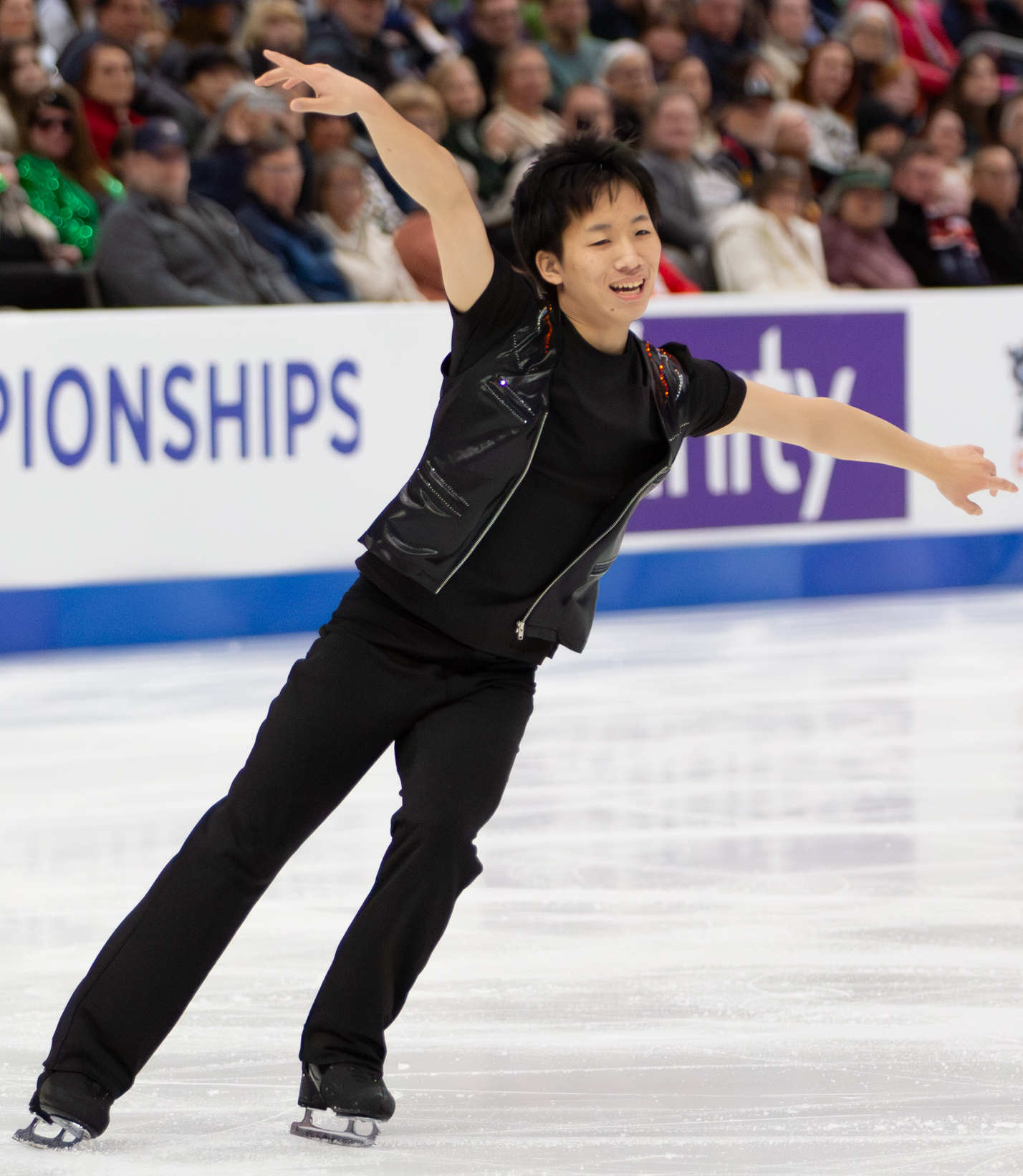
- Hiwatashi at the 2026 U.S. Championships

Personal information
- Native name: 樋渡知樹
- Born: January 20, 2000 (age 26) Englewood, New Jersey, U.S.
- Height: 5 ft 3 in (1.60 m)

Figure skating career
- Country: United States
- Discipline: Men's singles
- Coach: Mie Hamada; Hiroaki Sato; Satsuki Muramoto
- Skating club: DuPage Figure Skating Club, Buffalo Grove
- Began skating: 2005
- Retired: January 25, 2026

Medal record
U.S. Championships
Bronze medal – third place	2020 Greensboro	Singles
World Junior Championships
Gold medal – first place	2019 Zagreb	Singles
Bronze medal – third place	2016 Debrecen	Singles

Tomoki Richard Hiwatashi (born January 20, 2000) is a retired American figure skater. He is a four-time ISU Challenger Series bronze medalist and a two-time U.S. national medalist.

At the junior level, he is the 2019 World Junior champion, the 2016 World Junior bronze medalist, a five-time medalist on the ISU Junior Grand Prix series, and the 2016 U.S. junior national champion.

== Personal life ==
Hiwatashi was born on January 20, 2000, in Englewood, New Jersey. His mother, Satomi, and father, Satoshi Hiwatashi, are both from Kobe, Japan. He was raised with two sisters. For much of his early life, he lived in the Chicago suburb Hoffman Estates. From 2018 to 2023, he trained and resided in Colorado Springs, Colorado before moving to Osaka, Japan to train.

== Career ==
=== Early career ===
Hiwatashi began skating at age five after a rink opened near his house. He competed on the juvenile level during the 2008–2009 season, placing fourth at the Upper Great Lakes Regional Championships. Continuing as a juvenile in 2009–2010, he won the bronze medal at the Upper Great Lakes Regionals before finishing sixth at the 2010 U.S. Championships. During the 2010–2011 season, he won the juvenile gold medal at both the Upper Great Lakes Regionals and the 2011 U.S. Championships.

In 2011–2012, Hiwatashi moved up to the intermediate level, winning the gold medal at the Upper Great Lakes Regionals and the 2012 U.S. Championships. He advanced to the novice level in 2012–13, winning the gold medal at the Upper Great Lakes Regionals, the Midwestern Sectionals, and the 2013 U.S. Championships.

Coached by Alexandre Fadeev in Wilmette, Illinois, Hiwatashi was scheduled to make his ISU Junior Grand Prix (JGP) debut in Mexico in early September 2013 but sustained a medial malleolus fracture in his left foot during an official practice at the competition. As a result, he missed the rest of the 2013–2014 season.

=== 2014–2015 season: Junior debut ===
Hiwatashi competed on the junior level during the 2014–2015 season. He won the bronze medal at the Midwestern Sectionals and placed fifth at the 2015 U.S. Championships. He ended his season with the junior gold medal at the International Challenge Cup.

=== 2015–2016 season: World Junior bronze ===
In 2015–2016, Hiwatashi debuted on the JGP series, placing fifth in Colorado Springs, Colorado before winning the bronze medal in Zagreb, Croatia. He won the junior silver medal at the Midwestern Sectionals, finishing second to Alexei Krasnozhon, and went on to become the junior national champion, outscoring Kevin Shum by 14.78 points for gold at the 2016 U.S. Championships. Later that month, he was selected to replace the injured Nathan Chen at the 2016 World Junior Championships in Debrecen, Hungary.

In March at the World Junior Championships, he placed sixth in the short program and third in the free skate to win the bronze medal behind Daniel Samohin of Israel and Nicolas Nadeau of Canada. He was coached by Alexander Ouriashev in Glen Ellyn, Illinois.

=== 2016–2017 season: Senior international debut ===
Hiwatashi started his season at 2016 JGP Saint-Gervais, where he placed sixth. He competed at the 2016 CS Warsaw Cup, placing ninth, and finished fifteenth at the 2017 U.S. Championships on the senior level. During the season, he was coached by Kori Ade in Monument, Colorado.

=== 2017–2018 season: Two Junior Grand Prix bronze ===
Hiwatashi won two bronze medals on the 2017 JGP circuit at 2017 JGP Riga and 2017 JGP Egna. At the 2018 U.S. Championships, he placed fifteenth in the short program, seventh in the free skate, and twelfth overall. He finished seventh at the 2018 World Junior Championships in Sofia, Bulgaria. By the end of the season, he was training under Christine Krall and Damon Allen in Colorado.

=== 2018–2019 season: World Junior champion & two Junior Grand Prix silver ===
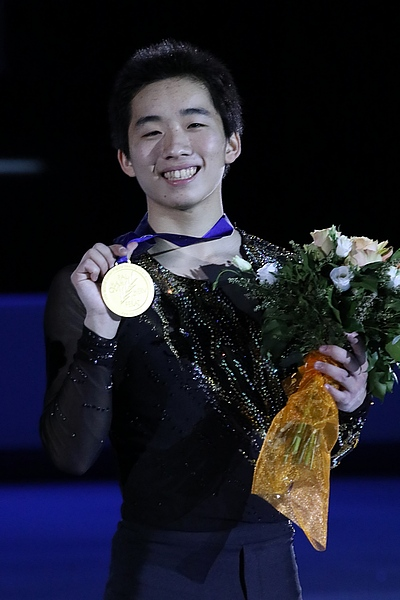
Hiwatashi at the 2019 World Junior Championships

In September 2018, Hiwatashi won the silver medal at the 2018 JGP Canada, behind Petr Gumennik. He won another silver medal at his second event, the 2018 JGP Slovenia. These results qualified Hiwatashi to the 2018–19 Junior Grand Prix Final in Vancouver, Canada. He next competed on the senior level at the 2018 CS Alpen Trophy, where he won the bronze medal. Concluding the fall season at the Junior Grand Prix Final, he placed sixth overall after struggling in both programs.

At the 2019 U.S. Championships, Hiwatashi won the Pewter medal.

Due to US national champion Nathan Chen's schedule conflicting with the 2019 Four Continents Championships, Hiwatashi made his senior ISU Championship debut after being named to the Four Continents team with Vincent Zhou and Jason Brown. He set a new personal best score and placed eighth.

In his final event of the season, Hiwatashi competed at the 2019 World Junior Championships alongside countrymen Alexei Krasnozhon and Camden Pulkinen. He placed second in the short program, briefly holding the junior world record until it was reclaimed minutes later by Pulkinen. In the free skate, he placed second behind Russian competitor Roman Savosin after cleanly landing a quadruple toe loop-triple toe loop combination but popping a second planned quadruple toe loop to a double toe loop. However, his strong placement in the short program combined with his performance in the free skate allowed him to claim victory overall, and he became the World Junior Champion, ahead of Savosin and bronze medalist Daniel Grassl of Italy.

=== 2019–2020 season: Grand Prix debut & U.S. national bronze ===
Hiwatashi began his first full senior season with a fifth-place finish at the 2019 CS U.S. Classic. Making this debut on the senior Grand Prix at the 2019 Internationaux de France, Hiwatashi placed tenth in the short program after multiple jump errors but rose to fifth place overall in the free skate.

Competing at the 2020 U.S. Championships, Hiwatashi placed fifth in the short program with a clean skate. Third in the free skate, he won the bronze medal, standing on the senior national podium for the second time. Despite placing third, he was not chosen for one of America's three berths at the 2020 World Championships, the third spot going to reigning World bronze medalist Vincent Zhou, who finished slightly under three points behind Hiwatashi in fourth. Hiwatashi was instead assigned to compete at the 2020 Four Continents Championships in Seoul. He placed ninth at Four Continents.

=== 2020–2021 season ===
With the coronavirus pandemic raging, Hiwatashi was assigned to compete at the 2020 Skate America, the ISU having made Grand Prix assignments based primarily on geography. Hiwatashi placed fourth at the event, despite a fall and a singled jump in the free skate.

Competing at the 2021 U.S. Championships, also held in Las Vegas, Hiwatashi placed seventh.

=== 2021–2022 season ===
Hiwatashi began his season at the 2021 CS Lombardia Trophy, where he placed fifth. He was eleventh to start the Grand Prix at 2021 Skate Canada International. At his second event, the 2021 NHK Trophy, he placed ninth. After the free skate, Hiwatashi said he "wanted to focus on doing my three quads, and I was able to do that."

Scheduled to compete at the 2022 U.S. Championships in hopes of qualifying for the American Olympic team, Hiwatashi was forced to withdraw due to a positive COVID test. Despite this, he was named to the American team for the 2022 Four Continents Championships in Tallinn, where he was eighth.

=== 2022–2023 season ===
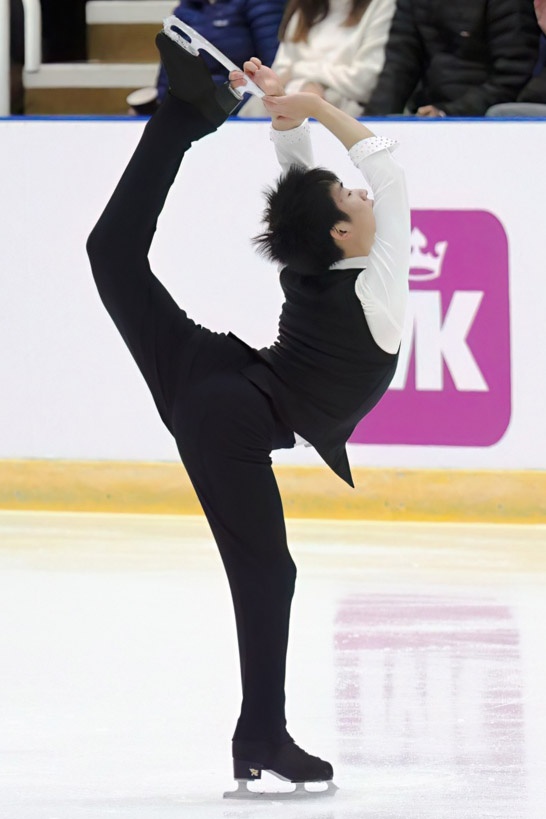
Hiwatashi performing a Biellmann spin during his free skate at the 2022 MK John Wilson Trophy

After winning the silver medal at the Skating Club of Boston's Cranberry Cup, Hiwatashi competed twice on the Grand Prix, finishing ninth at the 2022 MK John Wilson Trophy and then twelfth at the 2022 NHK Trophy.

Struggling with a back injury at the 2023 U.S. Championships, Hiwatashi finished a disappointing tenth-place. Following the season, he moved to Kyoto, Japan to train under Mie Hamada, Hiroaki Sato, and Satsuki Muramoto at the Kinoshita Academy.

=== 2023–2024 season ===
At the 2023 CS Budapest Trophy, Hiwatashi placed third, winning his second ISU Challenger Series Medal. At the 2023 CS Golden Spin of Zagreb, Hiwatashi placed eight in the short program after falling on his opening quad toe loop. In the free skate, Hiwatashi placed eight again, finishing eighth overall.

In advance of the 2024 U.S. Championships, Hiwatashi was preemptively named to the American team for the 2024 Four Continents Championships, which were to occur in Shanghai the week after the national championships. He finished eighth at the national championships, and then went on to place eleventh at the Four Continents Championships.

=== 2024–2025 season ===
Hiwatashi started the season with an eleventh-place finish at the 2024 Cranberry Cup International. He then went on to finish eighth at the 2024 NHK Trophy. One week following that event, Hiwatashi won the gold medal at the 2025 Midwestern Sectional Championships. He subsequently followed this up by finishing eleventh at the 2024 CS Golden Spin of Zagreb.

In January, Hiwatashi competed at the 2025 U.S. Championships, where he finished in sixth place. As the second alternate for the 2025 Four Continents Championships, he was subsequently called up to compete following the withdrawal of Maxim Naumov. At the event, he ultimately finished ninth overall.

=== 2025–2026 season: Final competitive season & retirement ===
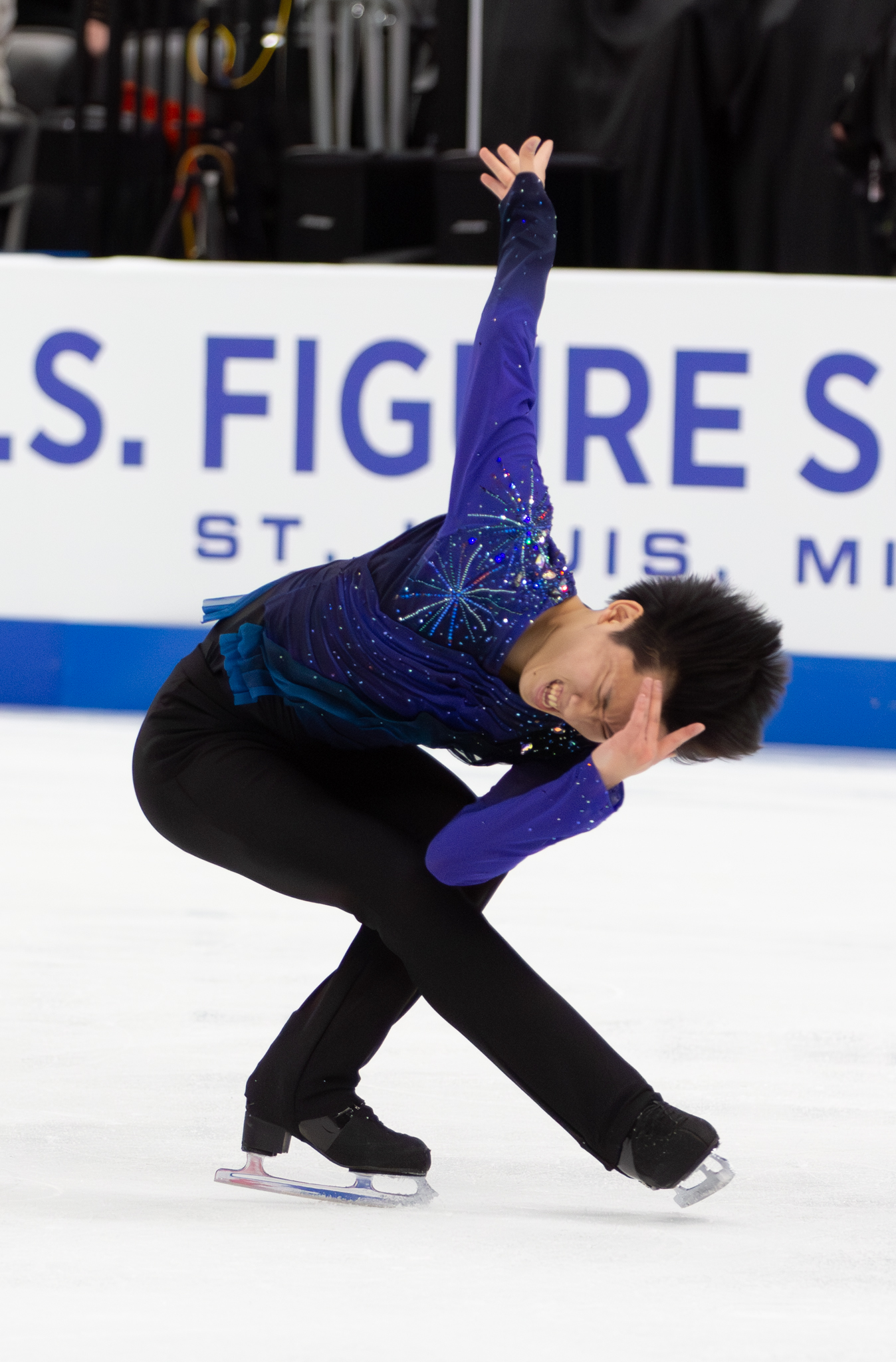
Hiwatashi performing a sit spin during his free skate at the 2026 U.S. Championships

Hiwatashi began the season by competing on the 2025–26 ISU Challenger Series, finishing ninth at the 2025 CS Cranberry Cup International as well as winning bronze at the 2025 CS Kinoshita Group Cup and at the 2025 CS Trialeti Trophy.

In late October, he competed at the 2025 Cup of China, where he finished in fourth place, earning a new personal best free skate and combined total score in the process. He then followed this up with a ninth-place finish at 2025 Skate Canada International.

At the 2026 U.S. Championships in January, Hiwatashi skated a solid short program and placed second in that segment. During the free skate, several of Hiwatashi's jumps received negative grade of execution points, placing fifth in that segment and placing fifth overall. “I really enjoyed myself on the ice,” Hiwatashi reflected. “I really felt like I put everything in there. I fought for it. I fought for that spot. I fought for everything I had. And I think I’ve done well doing it. He was subsequently named to the 2026 Four Continents team.

At the 2026 Four Continents Championships, Hiwatashi placed eighth in both segments to place seventh overall with a score of 240.54, only .29 ahead of Jacob Sanchez. He subsequently announced his retirement. "I think this Four Continents was the competition for me to just enjoy myself and put an ending to my skating career," he said. "And my goal in the future is to be involved with skating, being a technical specialist, cheering and supporting the skaters."

== Skating technique ==
Unlike most skaters, Hiwatashi jumps and spins clockwise. He also can perform the Biellmann spin, an element rarely performed by men due to the flexibility it requires.

== Programs ==
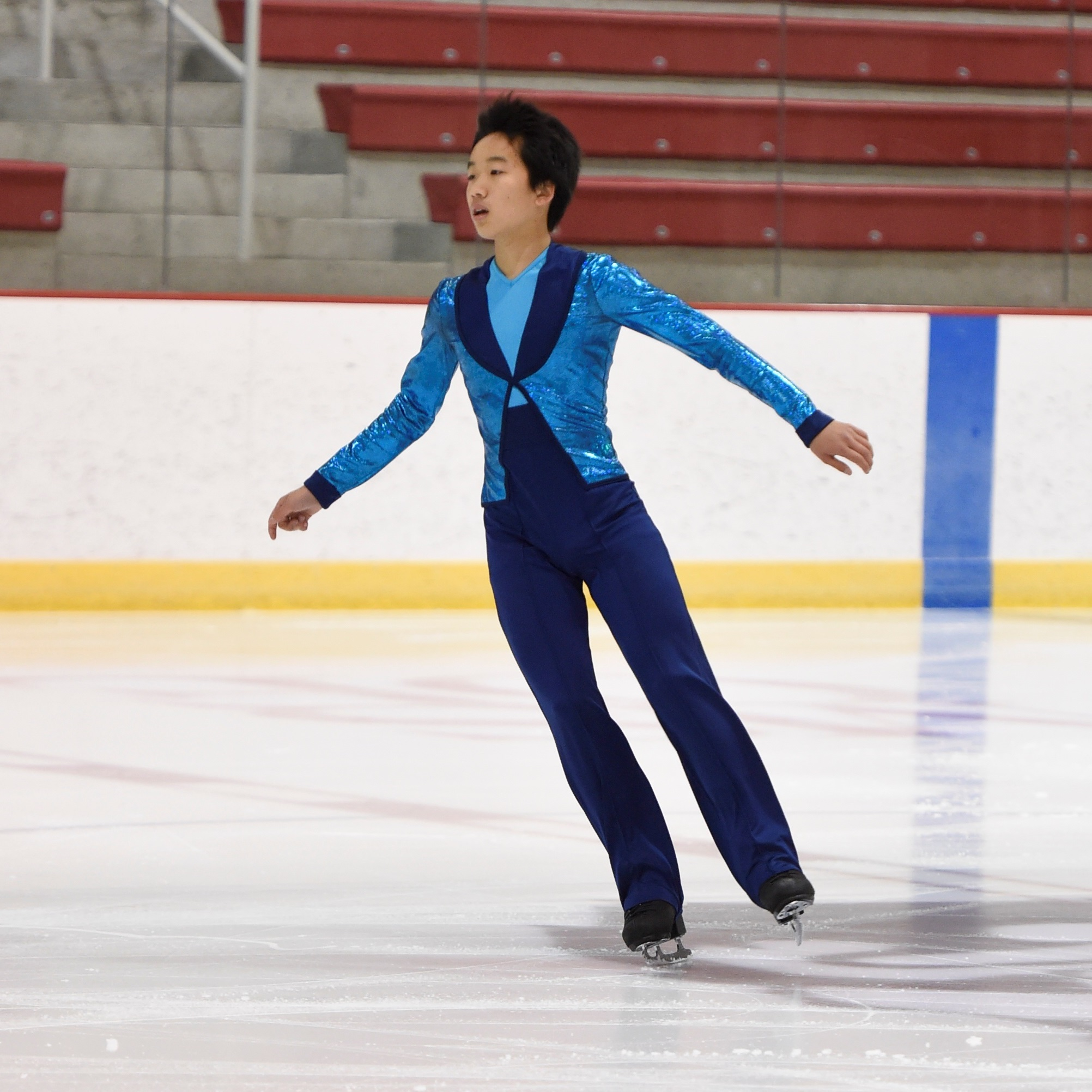
Tomoki Hiwatashi at 2015 Skate Milwaukee

Season	Short program	Free skating	Exhibition
2012–13	Orange Blossom Special by Ervin T. Rouse choreo. by Alexandre Fadeev	Die Fledermaus by Johann Strauss II choreo. by Alexandre Fadeev	
2013–15	Take Five; Unsquare Dance by The Dave Brubeck Quartet choreo. by Alexandre Fadeev	The Barber of Seville by Gioachino Rossini choreo. by Alexandre Fadeev	
2015–16	I Got You (I Feel Good) by James Brown choreo. by Olga Ganicheva	Charlie Chaplin; Two Little Ballet Shoes (from Limelight) by Charlie Chaplin; The Reel Chaplin: A Symphonic Adventure by Carl Davis choreo. by Olga Ganicheva	Great Balls of Fire by Jerry Lee Lewis
2016–17	Some Things; Big and Bad by Big Bad Voodoo Daddy choreo. by Marina Zueva	La Strada by Nino Rota choreo. by Marina Zueva	
2017–18	Emerald Tiger by Vanessa-Mae choreo. by Rohene Ward	The Last of the Mohicans by Trevor Jones choreo. by Rohene Ward	
2018–19	Cry Me a River by Arthur Hamilton performed by Michael Bublé choreo. by Mark Pillay	Fate of the Gods by Steven Reineke choreo. by Benjamin Agosto	
2019–20	Love Runs Out by OneRepublic choreo. by Mark Pillay	Petrushka by Igor Stravinsky choreo. by Tom Dickson	
2020–21	Standards by Leslie Odom Jr. choreo. by Mark Pillay	Take Five by The Dave Brubeck Quartet; Blue Light, Red Light by Harry Connick Jr.; Nutville by Buddy Rich choreo. by Benjamin Agosto	
2021–22	Standards by Leslie Odom Jr. choreo. by Mark Pillay	The Artist by Ludovic Bource choreo. by Mark Pillay	
2022–23	Romani Holiday (from Sherlock Holmes) by Hans Zimmer choreo. by Mark Pillay	The Artist by Ludovic Bource choreo. by Mark Pillay	
2023–24	Romani Holiday (from Sherlock Holmes) by Hans Zimmer choreo. by Mark Pillay	Finlandia by Jean Sibelius choreo. by Jeffrey Buttle	
2024–25	Super Bad by James Brown; Super Bad (Agami Remix) by James Brown performed by Kraddy & Agami Music choreo. by Cathy Reed	Kōtan (from Rurouni Kenshin: The Legend Ends); Hitokiri battōsai ~ kishin ~ (from Rurouni Kenshin: The Beginning); Kyō yume (from Rurouni Kenshin: Kyoto Inferno); Seiseiruten Shin Jidai He; Hiten (from Rurouni Kenshin); Saigo no tatakai (from Rurouni Kenshin: The Final) by Naoki Satō choreo. by Kenji Miyamoto; Jimmy's Tux (from The Tuxedo) by John Debney; Fight or Flight (from Spy Hunter) by Ryan Shore choreo. by Cathy Reed	
2025–26	Free Bird by Lynyrd Skynyrd choreo. by Cathy Reed	Creep by Radiohead performed by Vincint choreo. by Misha Ge	Kyouran Hey Kids!! (from Noragami Aragoto) by The Oral Cigarettes

== Competitive highlights ==
- GP – Event of the ISU Grand Prix Series
- JGP – Event of the ISU Junior Grand Prix Series
- CS – Event of the ISU Challenger Series
- TBD – Assigned
- WD – Withdrew from competition

Competition placements at senior level
Season	2016–17	2017–18	2018–19	2019–20	2020–21	2021–22	2022–23	2023–24	2024–25	2025–26
Four Continents Championships			8th	9th		8th		11th	9th	7th
U.S. Championships	15th	12th	4th	3rd	7th		10th	8th	6th	5th
GP Cup of China										4th
GP France				5th						
GP NHK Trophy				10th		9th	12th		8th	
GP Skate America					4th					
GP Skate Canada						11th				9th
GP Wilson Trophy							9th			
CS Alpen Trophy			3rd							
CS Budapest Trophy								3rd		
CS Cranberry Cup									11th	9th
CS Golden Spin of Zagreb								9th	11th	
CS Kinoshita Group Cup										3rd
CS Lombardia Trophy						5th				
CS Trialeti Trophy										3rd
CS U.S. Classic				5th						
CS Warsaw Cup	9th									
Cranberry Cup						7th	2nd			

Competition placements at junior level
Season	2014–15	2015–16	2016–17	2017–18	2018–19
World Junior Championships		3rd		7th	1st
Junior Grand Prix Final					6th
U.S. Championships	5th	1st			
JGP Canada					2nd
JGP Croatia		3rd			
JGP France			6th		
JGP Italy				3rd	
JGP Latvia				3rd	
JGP Slovenia					2nd
JGP United States		5th			
Challenge Cup	1st				

== Detailed results ==
ISU personal best scores in the +5/-5 GOE System
Segment	Type	Score	Event
Total	TSS	245.71	2025 Cup of China
Short program	TSS	90.52	2025 Cup of China
Short program	TES	49.77	2020 Four Continents Championships
Short program	PCS	38.56	2019 Internationaux de France
Free skating	TSS	166.64	2025 Cup of China
Free skating	TES	90.52	2025 Grand Prix Cup of China
Free skating	PCS	78.48	2019 Four Continents Championships

ISU personal best scores in the +3/-3 GOE System
Segment	Type	Score	Event
Total	TSS	222.52	2016 World Junior Championships
Short program	TSS	74.97	2016 World Junior Championships
Short program	TES	41.75	2016 World Junior Championships
Short program	PCS	33.22	2016 World Junior Championships
Free skating	TSS	147.55	2016 World Junior Championships
Free skating	TES	75.27	2016 World Junior Championships
Free skating	PCS	72.28	2016 World Junior Championships

- Small medals for the short program and free skating are only awarded at ISU Championships.
- At national events in the United States, pewter medals are awarded for fourth place.

=== Senior level ===
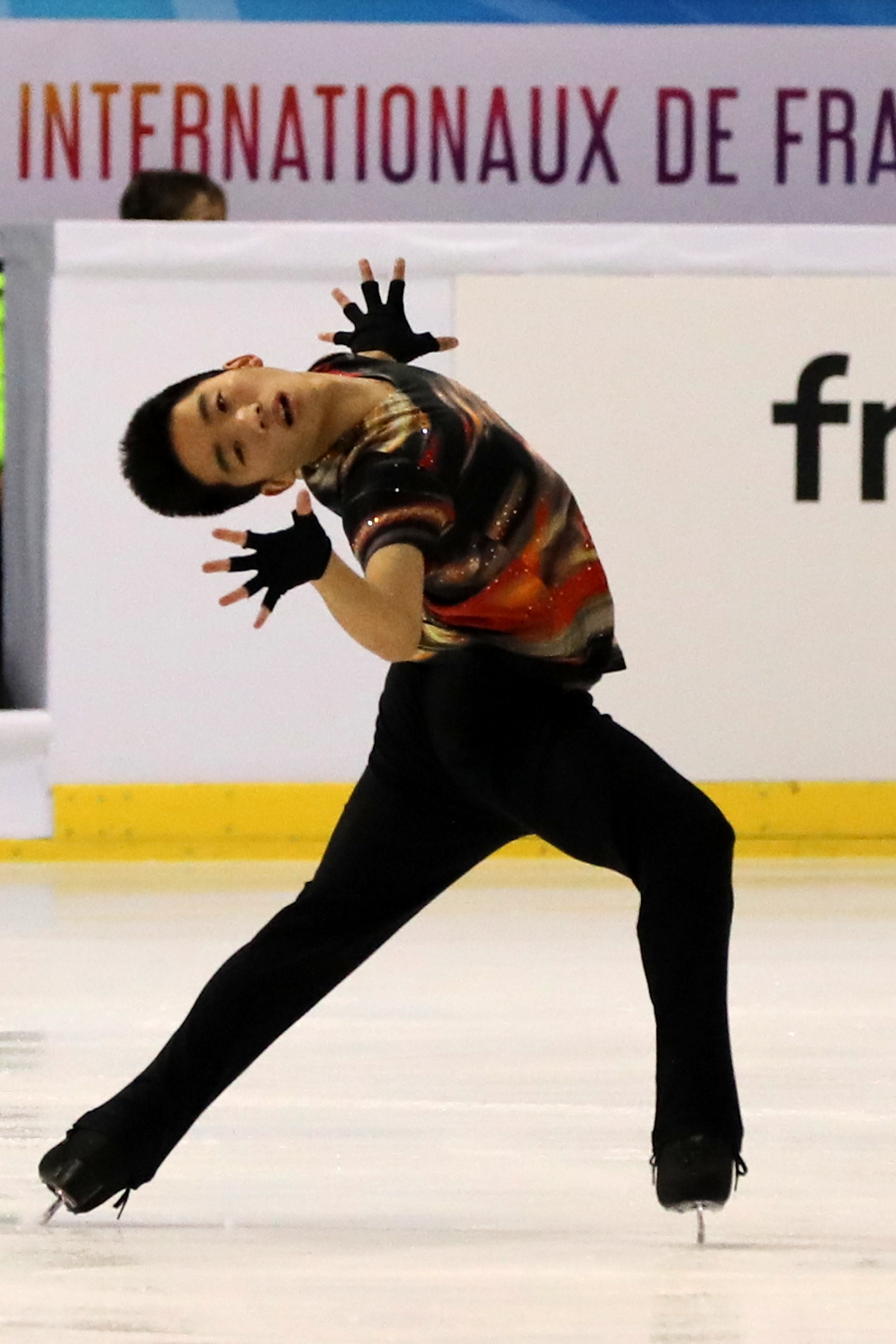
Hiwatashi at the 2019 Internationaux de France

Results in the 2016–17 season
Date	Event	SP		FS		Total	
Date	Event	P	Score	P	Score	P	Score
Nov 17–20, 2016	(Poland) 2016 CS Warsaw Cup	8	63.54	8	118.58	9	182.12
Jan 14–22, 2017	(United States) 2017 U.S. Championships	13	71.79	18	124.30	15	196.09

Results in the 2017–18 season
Date	Event	SP		FS		Total	
Date	Event	P	Score	P	Score	P	Score
Dec 29, 2017 – Jan 8, 2018	(United States) 2018 U.S. Championships	15	63.48	7	154.05	12	217.53

Results in the 2018–19 season
Date	Event	SP		FS		Total	
Date	Event	P	Score	P	Score	P	Score
Nov 11–18, 2018	(Austria) 2018 CS Alpen Trophy	3	77.22	7	121.99	3	199.21
Jan 19–27, 2019	(United States) 2019 U.S. Championships	4	84.05	4	169.23	4	253.28
Feb 7–10, 2019	(United States) 2019 Four Continents Championships	9	76.95	7	159.84	8	236.79

Results in the 2019–20 season
Date	Event	SP		FS		Total	
Date	Event	P	Score	P	Score	P	Score
Sep 17–22, 2019	(United States) 2019 CS U.S. International Classic	4	76.96	5	137.96	5	214.82
Nov 1–3, 2019	2019 Internationaux de France	10	68.70	4	158.73	5	227.43
Nov 22–24, 2019	(Japan) 2019 NHK Trophy	11	64.54	9	142.76	10	207.30
Jan 20–26, 2020	(United States) 2020 U.S. Championships	5	94.21	3	183.87	3	278.08
Feb 4–9, 2020	(South Korea) 2020 Four Continents Championships	8	88.09	9	152.69	9	240.78

Results in the 2020–21 season
Date	Event	SP		FS		Total	
Date	Event	P	Score	P	Score	P	Score
Oct 23–24, 2020	(United States) 2020 Skate America	4	87.17	4	158.13	4	245.30
Jan 11–21, 2021	(United States) 2021 U.S. Championships	9	75.51	6	154.63	7	230.14

Results in the 2021–22 season
Date	Event	SP		FS		Total	
Date	Event	P	Score	P	Score	P	Score
Aug 11–15, 2021	(United States) 2021 Cranberry Cup International	7	71.44	6	133.73	7	205.17
Sep 10–12, 2021	(Italy) 2021 CS Lombardia Trophy	9	66.69	4	146.42	5	213.11
Oct 29–31, 2021	2021 Skate Canada International	11	72.92	7	148.85	11	221.77
Nov 12–14, 2021	(Japan) 2021 NHK Trophy	9	72.36	9	144.72	9	217.08
Jan 18–23, 2022	(Estonia) 2022 Four Continents Championships	7	77.51	10	144.86	8	222.37

Results in the 2022–23 season
Date	Event	SP		FS		Total	
Date	Event	P	Score	P	Score	P	Score
Aug 9–14, 2022	(United States) 2022 Cranberry Cup International	4	69.10	2	137.20	2	206.30
Nov 11–13, 2022	(United Kingdom) 2022 MK John Wilson Trophy	8	66.68	9	122.05	9	188.73
Nov 18–20, 2022	(Japan) 2022 NHK Trophy	12	57.18	12	127.87	12	185.05
Jan 23–29, 2023	(United States) 2023 U.S. Championships	3	85.43	14	132.19	10	217.62

Results in the 2023–24 season
Date	Event	SP		FS		Total	
Date	Event	P	Score	P	Score	P	Score
Oct 13–15, 2023	(Hungary) 2023 CS Budapest Trophy	7	69.16	3	154.63	3	223.79
Dec 6–9, 2023	(Croatia) 2023 CS Golden Spin of Zagreb	8	63.22	8	128.50	9	191.72
Jan 22–28, 2024	(United States) 2024 U.S. Championships	6	81.31	9	149.49	8	230.80
Jan 30 – Feb 4, 2024	(China) 2024 Four Continents Championships	10	75.39	11	142.35	11	217.74

Results in the 2024–25 season
Date	Event	SP		FS		Total	
Date	Event	P	Score	P	Score	P	Score
Aug 8–11, 2024	(United States) 2024 CS Cranberry Cup	2	84.40	11	106.16	11	190.56
Nov 8–10, 2024	(Japan) 2024 NHK Trophy	11	74.59	7	151.79	8	226.38
Nov 18–24, 2024	(United States) 2025 Midwestern Sectional Championships	1	79.79	2	148.91	1	228.70
Dec 4–7, 2024	(Croatia) 2024 CS Golden Spin of Zagreb	8	71.66	11	121.20	11	192.86
Jan 20–26, 2025	(United States) 2025 U.S. Championships	10	75.21	5	158.44	6	233.65
Feb 19–23, 2025	(South Korea) 2025 Four Continents Championships	15	65.88	9	148.91	9	214.79

Results in the 2025–26 season
Date	Event	SP		FS		Total	
Date	Event	P	Score	P	Score	P	Score
Aug 7–10, 2025	(United States) 2025 CS Cranberry Cup International	9	69.45	9	132.21	9	201.66
Sep 5–7, 2025	(Japan) 2025 CS Kinoshita Group Cup	4	83.62	3	153.09	3	236.71
Oct 8–11, 2025	(Georgia (country)) 2025 CS Trialeti Trophy	5	79.55	3	157.56	3	237.11
Oct 24–26, 2025	2025 Cup of China	6	79.07	4	166.64	4	245.71
Oct 31 – Nov 2, 2025	2025 Skate Canada International	9	84.32	9	146.26	9	230.58
Jan 4–11, 2026	(United States) 2026 U.S. Championships	2	89.26	5	157.98	5	247.24
Jan 21–25, 2026	(China) 2026 Four Continents Championships	8	80.88	8	159.66	7	240.54

=== Junior level ===
Results in the 2014–15 season
Date	Event	SP		FS		Total	
Date	Event	P	Score	P	Score	P	Score
Jan 18–25, 2015	(United States) 2024 U.S. Championships (Junior)	5	61.20	5	125.67	5	186.87
Feb 19–22, 2015	(Netherlands) 2015 International Challenge Cup	1	62.89	1	110.46	1	173.35

Results in the 2015–16 season
Date	Event	SP		FS		Total	
Date	Event	P	Score	P	Score	P	Score
Sep 2–5, 2015	2015 JGP United States	6	59.84	5	125.82	5	185.66
Oct 7–11, 2015	2015 JGP Croatia	4	66.02	3	131.60	3	197.62
Jan 15–24, 2016	(United States) 2016 U.S. Championships (Junior)	1	65.90	1	136.83	1	202.73
Mar 14–20, 2016	(Hungary) 2016 World Junior Championships	6	74.97	3	147.55	3	222.52

Results in the 2016–17 season
Date	Event	SP		FS		Total	
Date	Event	P	Score	P	Score	P	Score
Aug 24–28, 2016	2016 JGP France	6	57.90	4	123.04	6	180.94

Results in the 2017–18 season
Date	Event	SP		FS		Total	
Date	Event	P	Score	P	Score	P	Score
Sep 6–9, 2017	2017 JGP Latvia	5	61.35	3	128.54	3	189.89
Oct 11–14, 2017	2017 JGP Italy	3	73.28	4	133.00	3	206.28
Mar 5–11, 2018	(Bulgaria) 2018 World Junior Championships	11	67.85	7	138.83	7	206.68

Results in the 2018–19 season
Date	Event	SP		FS		Total	
Date	Event	P	Score	P	Score	P	Score
Sep 12–15, 2018	2018 JGP Canada	1	76.81	2	136.43	2	213.24
Oct 3–6, 2018	2018 JGP Slovenia	3	74.17	3	140.99	2	215.16
Dec 6–9, 2018	(Canada) 2018–19 Junior Grand Prix Final	6	62.48	5	128.32	6	190.80
Mar 4–10, 2019	(Croatia) 2019 World Junior Championships	2	81.50	2	148.82	1	230.32
