= 2019 World Junior Figure Skating Championships =

Figure skating event

- Type: ISU Championship
- Date: 4 – 10 March
- Season: 2018–19
- Location: Zagreb, Croatia
- Host: Croatian Figure Skating Federation
- Venue: Dom Sportova

Champions
- Men's singles: (United States) Tomoki Hiwatashi
- Ladies' singles: (Russia) Alexandra Trusova
- Pairs: (Russia) Anastasia Mishina / Aleksandr Galiamov
- Ice dance: (Canada) Marjorie Lajoie / Zachary Lagha
- Previous: 2018 World Junior Championships
- Next: 2020 World Junior Championships

The 2019 World Junior Figure Skating Championships were held in Zagreb, Croatia from 4 to 10 March 2019.

== Records ==
The following new ISU best scores were set during this competition:

Event	Component	Skater(s)	Score	Date	Ref
Men	Short program	(United States) Tomoki Hiwatashi	81.50	6 March 2019	
Men	Short program	(United States) Camden Pulkinen	82.41	6 March 2019	
Pairs	Short program	(Russia) Anastasia Mishina / Aleksandr Galiamov	67.02	6 March 2019	
Pairs	Short program	(Russia) Apollinariia Panfilova / Dmitry Rylov	67.91	6 March 2019	
Pairs	Short program	(Russia) Polina Kostiukovich / Dmitrii Ialin	68.31	6 March 2019	
Ice dance	Rhythm dance	(Canada) Marjorie Lajoie / Zachary Lagha	70.14	7 March 2019	
Ice dance	Free dance	(Canada) Marjorie Lajoie / Zachary Lagha	105.96	9 March 2019	
Ice dance	Total score	(Canada) Marjorie Lajoie / Zachary Lagha	176.10	9 March 2019	
Ladies	Free skating	(Russia) Alexandra Trusova	150.40	9 March 2019	
Ladies	Total score	(Russia) Alexandra Trusova	222.89	9 March 2019	

== Qualification ==
=== Minimum TES ===
The ISU stipulates that the minimum scores must be achieved at an ISU-recognized junior international competition in the ongoing or preceding season, no later than 21 days before the first official practice day.

Minimum technical scores (TES)
Discipline	SP / SD 2017–18	FS / FD 2017–18	SP / RD 2018–19	FS / FD 2018–19
Men	23	44	23	42
Ladies	21	36	23	38
Pairs	23	35	23	34
Ice dance	20	30	22	35

- Must be achieved at an ISU-recognized international event in the ongoing or preceding season.
- SP/RD and FS/FD scores may be attained at different events.

=== Number of entries per discipline ===
Based on the results of the 2018 Junior World Championships, each ISU member nation can field one to three entries per discipline.

Spots	Men	Ladies	Pairs	Dance
3	Russia; United States	Russia; Japan	Russia; United States	Russia; United States
2	Italy; Canada; Ukraine; Japan; Germany; South Korea	South Korea; United States; Germany	China; Canada; Germany; Japan	Canada; France; Georgia; Germany
If not listed above, one entry is allowed.

== Entries ==
Member nations began announcing their selections in January 2019. The International Skating Union published the full list of entries on 12 February 2019.

Country	Men	Ladies	Pairs	Ice dancing
Armenia				Viktoriia Azroian / Aleksandr Siroshtan
Australia				Jessica Palfreyman / Nicholas McCreary
Austria	Luc Maierhofer	Olga Mikutina		Marina Philippova / Vadym Kravtsov
Azerbaijan	Vladimir Litvintsev	Ekaterina Ryabova		
Belarus	Yakau Zenko	Aliaksandra Chepeleva		Emiliya Kalehanova / Uladzislau Palkhouski
Bulgaria	Radoslav Marinov	Alexandra Feigin		
Canada	Stephen Gogolev; Joseph Phan	Alison Schumacher	Gabrielle Levesque / Pier-Alexandre Hudon; Brooke McIntosh / Brandon Toste	Alicia Fabbri / Paul Ayer; Marjorie Lajoie / Zachary Lagha
China	Chen Yudong	Chen Hongyi	Tang Feiyao / Yang Yongchao	Chen Xizi / Xing Jianing
Chinese Taipei		Mandy Chiang		Chloe Dan Tsoi / Long You Zimou Wang
Croatia	Charles Henry Katanovic	Hana Cvijanović		
Czech Republic	Matyáš Bělohradský	Nikola Rychtaříková		Natálie Taschlerová / Filip Taschler
Denmark		Maia Sørensen		
Estonia	Mihhail Selevko	Eva Lotta Kiibus		Viktoria Semenjuk / Artur Gruzdev
Finland		Linnea Ceder		
France	Adam Siao Him Fa	Anna Kuzmenko	Cléo Hamon / Denys Strekalin	Loicia Demougeot / Théo Le Mercier; Evgenia Lopareva / Geoffrey Brissaud
Georgia	Irakli Maysuradze	Alina Urushadze		Maria Kazakova / Georgy Reviya
Germany	Jonathan Hess; Nikita Starostin	Elodie Eudine; Ann-Christin Marold	Letizia Roscher / Luis Schuster; Talisa Thomalla / Robert Kunkel	Charise Matthaei / Maximilian Pfisterer; Amanda Peterson / Stephano Valentino Schuster
Great Britain	Edward Appleby	Kristen Spours		Sasha Fear / George Waddell
Greece				Sophia Simitsakos / Jeffrey Wong
Hong Kong		Yi Christy Leung		
Hungary		Júlia Láng		Villö Marton / Danyil Semko
Israel	Mark Gorodnitsky	Alina Soupian	Hailey Esther Kops / Artem Tsoglin	Mariia Nosovitskaya / Mikhail Nosovitskiy
Italy	Gabriele Frangipani; Daniel Grassl	Lucrezia Beccari	Vivienne Contarino / Marco Pauletti	Francesca Righi / Aleksei Dubrovin
Japan	Koshiro Shimada; Tatsuya Tsuboi	Tomoe Kawabata; Yuna Shiraiwa; Yuhana Yokoi	Riku Miura / Shoya Ichihashi	Ayumi Takanami / Yoshimitsu Ikeda
Kazakhstan	Rakhat Bralin	Alana Toktarova		
Latvia		Arina Somova		
Lithuania		Paulina Ramanauskaitė		Mira Polishook / Deividas Kizala
Malaysia	Kai Xiang Chew			
Mexico		Andrea Montesinos Cantu		
Netherlands		Caya Scheepens		
New Zealand		Jocelyn Hong		
Poland	Kornel Witkowski	Oliwia Rzepiel		Olivia Oliver / Petr Paleev
Romania		Ana Sofia Beschea		
Russia	Artur Danielian; Petr Gumennik; Roman Savosin	Anna Shcherbakova; Ksenia Sinitsyna; Alexandra Trusova	Polina Kostiukovich / Dmitrii Ialin; Anastasia Mishina / Aleksandr Galiamov; Apollinariia Panfilova / Dmitry Rylov	Elizaveta Khudaiberdieva / Nikita Nazarov; Sofia Shevchenko / Igor Eremenko; Arina Ushakova / Maxim Nekrasov
South Korea	Cha Young-hyun; Lee Si-hyeong	Lee Hae-in; You Young		
Slovakia		Silvia Hugec	Tereza Zendulkova / Simon Fukas	
Slovenia		Nina Polsak		
Spain	Aleix Gabara	Marian Millares		Sofia Val / Linus Colmor Jepsen
Sweden	Nikolaj Majorov	Smilla Szalkai		
Switzerland	Nurullah Sahaka	Anais Coraducci		
Thailand	Micah Kai Lynette			
Turkey	Başar Oktar	Güzide Irmak Bayır		
Ukraine	Andriy Kokura; Ivan Shmuratko	Anastasiia Arkhipova	Sofiia Nesterova / Artem Darenskyi	Darya Popova / Volodymyr Byelikov
United States	Tomoki Hiwatashi; Alexei Krasnozhon; Camden Pulkinen	Ting Cui; Hanna Harrell	Sarah Feng / TJ Nyman; Kate Finster / Balazs Nagy; Laiken Lockley / Keenan Prochnow	Caroline Green / Gordon Green; Eliana Gropman / Ian Somerville; Avonley Nguyen / Vadym Kolesnik

=== Changes to initial assignments ===
Announced	Country	Discipline	Initial	Replacement	Reference
14 February 2019	Australia	Men	James Min	None	
21 February 2019	Sweden	Ladies	Selma Ihr	Smilla Szalkai	
26 February 2019	Singapore	Men	Chadwick Wang	None	
1 March 2019	Russia	Men	Alexey Erokhov	Artur Danielian	
4 March 2019	Russia	Ladies	Alena Kostornaia	Ksenia Sinitsyna	

== Results ==
=== Men ===
Rank	Name	Nation	Total points	SP		FS	
1	Tomoki Hiwatashi	United States	230.32	2	81.50	2	148.82
2	Roman Savosin	Russia	229.28	6	78.33	1	150.95
3	Daniel Grassl	Italy	224.67	3	81.19	4	143.48
4	Artur Danielian	Russia	220.68	9	77.71	5	142.97
5	Stephen Gogolev	Canada	220.66	10	77.00	3	143.66
6	Adam Siao Him Fa	France	219.91	8	77.74	6	142.17
7	Irakli Maysuradze	Georgia	217.78	11	76.46	7	141.32
8	Camden Pulkinen	United States	216.68	1	82.41	9	134.27
9	Koshiro Shimada	Japan	212.78	12	74.89	8	137.89
10	Petr Gumennik	Russia	212.14	4	80.33	11	131.81
11	Alexei Krasnozhon	United States	211.47	5	79.98	12	131.49
12	Joseph Phan	Canada	209.02	7	77.89	13	131.13
13	Vladimir Litvintsev	Azerbaijan	196.93	16	68.94	14	127.99
14	Tatsuya Tsuboi	Japan	195.88	20	62.59	10	133.29
15	Matyáš Bělohradský	Czech Republic	194.23	17	68.74	15	125.49
16	Ivan Shmuratko	Ukraine	191.32	13	73.31	17	118.01
17	Mark Gorodnitsky	Israel	185.62	15	69.22	18	116.40
18	Luc Maierhofer	Austria	184.15	14	70.47	21	113.68
19	Başar Oktar	Turkey	182.91	19	62.82	16	120.09
20	Cha Young-hyun	South Korea	177.22	21	61.75	19	115.47
21	Nikolaj Majorov	Sweden	176.93	23	61.47	20	115.46
22	Jonathan Hess	Germany	175.11	18	62.93	22	112.18
23	Gabriele Frangipani	Italy	170.89	24	61.32	23	109.57
24	Nikita Starostin	Germany	152.00	22	61.61	24	90.39
Did not advance to free skating
25	Chen Yudong	China	60.06	25	60.06	—N/a	
26	Andriy Kokura	Ukraine	57.93	26	57.93	—N/a	
27	Mihhail Selevko	Estonia	56.68	27	56.68	—N/a	
28	Micah Kai Lynette	Thailand	56.66	28	56.66	—N/a	
29	Lee Si-hyeong	South Korea	54.04	29	54.04	—N/a	
30	Yakau Zenko	Belarus	52.69	30	52.69	—N/a	
31	Nurullah Sahaka	Switzerland	52.44	31	52.44	—N/a	
32	Rakhat Bralin	Kazakhstan	50.28	32	50.28	—N/a	
33	Charles Henry Katanovic	Croatia	47.60	33	47.60	—N/a	
34	Aleix Gabara	Spain	47.53	34	47.53	—N/a	
35	Radoslav Marinov	Bulgaria	46.39	35	46.39	—N/a	
36	Edward Appleby	Great Britain	44.80	36	44.80	—N/a	
37	Kornel Witkowski	Poland	44.16	37	44.16	—N/a	
WD	Kai Xiang Chew	Malaysia	withdrew	withdrew from competition			

=== Ladies ===
Rank	Name	Nation	Total points	SP		FS	
1	Alexandra Trusova	Russia	222.89	2	72.49	1	150.40
2	Anna Shcherbakova	Russia	219.94	1	72.86	2	147.08
3	Ting Cui	United States	194.41	3	67.69	3	126.72
4	Ksenia Sinitsyna	Russia	188.84	4	66.52	6	122.32
5	Yuna Shiraiwa	Japan	185.46	6	62.08	4	123.38
6	You Young	South Korea	178.82	11	55.62	5	123.20
7	Hanna Harrell	United States	176.69	5	62.68	9	114.01
8	Lee Hae-in	South Korea	171.97	14	53.02	7	118.95
9	Yuhana Yokoi	Japan	170.17	18	51.61	8	118.56
10	Alison Schumacher	Canada	158.52	16	51.86	10	106.66
11	Alina Urushadze	Georgia	157.96	15	52.53	11	105.43
12	Tomoe Kawabata	Japan	157.47	9	57.65	13	99.82
13	Ekaterina Ryabova	Azerbaijan	154.60	12	54.28	12	100.32
14	Júlia Láng	Hungary	153.24	10	55.86	14	97.38
15	Anna Kuzmenko	France	147.86	7	59.20	18	88.66
16	Lucrezia Beccari	Italy	147.03	8	57.70	17	89.33
17	Anastasiia Arkhipova	Ukraine	146.39	17	51.62	16	94.77
18	Olga Mikutina	Austria	145.34	20	48.75	15	96.59
19	Chen Hongyi	China	141.49	13	53.24	19	88.25
20	Kristen Spours	Great Britain	136.72	19	51.08	23	85.64
21	Yi Christy Leung	Hong Kong	135.85	22	47.62	20	88.23
22	Alexandra Feigin	Bulgaria	135.69	21	48.45	21	87.24
23	Anaïs Coraducci	Switzerland	134.44	23	47.23	22	87.21
24	Alina Soupian	Israel	131.97	24	46.70	24	85.27
Did not advance to free skating
25	Hana Cvijanović	Croatia	46.33	25	46.33	—N/a	
26	Eva-Lotta Kiibus	Estonia	45.67	26	45.67	—N/a	
27	Mandy Chiang	Chinese Taipei	44.48	27	44.48	—N/a	
28	Élodie Eudine	Germany	43.59	28	43.59	—N/a	
29	Linnea Ceder	Finland	43.14	29	43.14	—N/a	
30	Smilla Szalkai	Sweden	43.02	30	43.02	—N/a	
31	Alana Toktarova	Kazakhstan	42.50	31	42.50	—N/a	
32	Jocelyn Hong	New Zealand	41.72	32	41.72	—N/a	
33	Nikola Rychtaříková	Czech Republic	41.51	33	41.51	—N/a	
34	Silvia Hugec	Slovakia	41.30	34	41.30	—N/a	
35	Aliaksandra Chepeleva	Belarus	40.47	35	40.47	—N/a	
36	Caya Scheepens	Netherlands	40.19	36	40.19	—N/a	
37	Ana Sofia Beschea	Romania	39.95	37	39.95	—N/a	
38	Ann-Christin Marold	Germany	39.88	38	39.88	—N/a	
39	Marian Millares	Spain	39.35	39	39.35	—N/a	
40	Oliwia Rzepiel	Poland	39.05	40	39.05	—N/a	
41	Paulina Ramanauskaitė	Lithuania	36.49	41	36.49	—N/a	
42	Arina Somova	Latvia	35.56	42	35.56	—N/a	
43	Andrea Montesinos Cantú	Mexico	35.15	43	35.15	—N/a	
44	Nina Polsak	Slovenia	34.51	44	34.51	—N/a	
45	Maia Sørensen	Denmark	31.68	45	31.68	—N/a	
46	Güzide Irmak Bayır	Turkey	30.09	46	30.09	—N/a	

=== Pairs ===
Rank	Name	Nation	Total points	SP		FS	
1	Anastasia Mishina / Aleksandr Galiamov	Russia	188.74	3	67.02	1	121.72
2	Apollinariia Panfilova / Dmitry Rylov	Russia	188.17	2	67.91	2	120.26
3	Polina Kostiukovich / Dmitrii Ialin	Russia	181.59	1	68.31	3	113.28
4	Tang Feiyao / Yang Yongchao	China	168.77	4	60.77	4	108.00
5	Sarah Feng / TJ Nyman	United States	162.90	6	58.43	5	104.47
6	Laiken Lockley / Keenan Prochnow	United States	159.54	5	59.96	6	99.58
7	Hailey Kops / Artem Tsoglin	Israel	144.28	7	53.03	7	91.25
8	Sofiia Nesterova / Artem Darenskyi	Ukraine	140.88	8	51.97	8	88.91
9	Cléo Hamon / Denys Strekalin	France	137.58	12	49.38	9	88.20
10	Brooke McIntosh / Brandon Toste	Canada	132.43	11	49.99	12	82.44
11	Kate Finster / Balazs Nagy	United States	132.29	10	50.30	13	81.99
12	Talisa Thomalla / Robert Kunkel	Germany	131.67	13	48.01	11	83.66
13	Vivienne Contarino / Marco Pauletti	Italy	131.20	14	46.88	10	84.32
14	Riku Miura / Shoya Ichihashi	Japan	130.30	9	51.55	15	78.75
15	Gabrielle Levesque / Pier-Alexandre Hudon	Canada	123.32	15	43.92	14	79.40
16	Tereza Zendulkova / Simon Fukas	Slovakia	113.06	16	42.81	16	70.25
Did not advance to free skating
17	Letizia Roscher / Luis Schuster	Germany	39.55	17	39.55	—N/a	

=== Ice dance ===
Rank	Name	Nation	Total points	RD		FD	
1	Marjorie Lajoie / Zachary Lagha	Canada	176.10	1	70.14	1	105.96
2	Elizaveta Khudaiberdieva / Nikita Nazarov	Russia	171.22	2	68.69	4	102.53
3	Sofia Shevchenko / Igor Eremenko	Russia	170.43	3	67.56	2	102.87
4	Avonley Nguyen / Vadym Kolesnik	United States	167.90	5	65.18	3	102.72
5	Arina Ushakova / Maxim Nekrasov	Russia	166.48	4	65.96	5	100.52
6	Maria Kazakova / Georgy Reviya	Georgia	155.40	6	60.08	6	95.32
7	Caroline Green / Gordon Green	United States	153.05	8	58.82	7	94.23
8	Loïcia Demougeot / Théo Le Mercier	France	144.33	7	59.33	9	85.00
9	Alicia Fabbri / Paul Ayer	Canada	143.04	13	55.58	8	87.46
10	Evgeniia Lopareva / Geoffrey Brissaud	France	141.98	10	57.99	10	83.99
11	Darya Popova / Volodymyr Byelikov	Ukraine	140.21	11	57.88	11	82.33
12	Eliana Gropman / Ian Somerville	United States	139.96	9	58.53	13	81.43
13	Francesca Righi / Aleksei Dubrovin	Italy	137.54	12	55.68	12	81.86
14	Natálie Taschlerová / Filip Taschler	Czech Republic	131.91	16	51.02	14	80.89
15	Emiliya Kalehanova / Uladzislau Palkhouski	Belarus	131.71	14	53.26	16	78.45
16	Viktoria Semenjuk / Artur Gruzdev	Estonia	129.87	15	51.05	15	78.82
17	Charise Matthaei / Maximilian Pfisterer	Germany	124.19	18	50.15	18	74.04
18	Sasha Fear / George Waddell	Great Britain	123.43	17	50.51	19	72.92
19	Mira Polishook / Deividas Kizala	Lithuania	122.10	19	47.17	17	74.93
20	Viktoriia Azroian / Aleksandr Siroshtan	Armenia	115.64	20	46.93	20	68.71
Did not advance to free dance
21	Sofia Val / Linus Colmor Jepsen	Spain	46.22	21	46.22	—N/a	
22	Amanda Peterson / Stephano Valentino Schuster	Germany	45.88	22	45.88	—N/a	
23	Villo Martin / Danyil Semko	Hungary	44.48	23	44.48	—N/a	
24	Chen Xizi / Xing Jianing	China	44.24	24	44.24	—N/a	
25	Mariia Nosovitskaya / Mikhail Nosovitskiy	Israel	43.10	25	43.10	—N/a	
26	Ayumi Takanami / Yoshimitsu Ikeda	Japan	41.74	26	41.74	—N/a	
27	Chloe Dan Tsoi / Long You Zimou Wang	Chinese Taipei	39.33	27	39.33	—N/a	
28	Olivia Oliver / Petr Paleev	Poland	38.64	28	38.64	—N/a	
29	Jessica Palfreyman / Nicholas McCreary	Australia	37.02	29	37.02	—N/a	
30	Sophia Simitsakos / Jeffrey Wong	Greece	36.35	30	36.35	—N/a	
31	Marina Philippova / Vadym Kravtsov	Austria	36.00	31	36.00	—N/a	

== Medals summary ==
=== Medalists ===
Medals awarded to the skaters who achieve the highest overall placements in each discipline:

Discipline	Gold	Silver	Bronze
Men	(United States) Tomoki Hiwatashi	(Russia) Roman Savosin	(Italy) Daniel Grassl
Ladies	(Russia) Alexandra Trusova	(Russia) Anna Shcherbakova	(United States) Ting Cui
Pairs	(Russia) Anastasia Mishina / Aleksandr Galiamov	(Russia) Apollinariia Panfilova / Dmitry Rylov	(Russia) Polina Kostiukovich / Dmitrii Ialin
Ice dancing	(Canada) Marjorie Lajoie / Zachary Lagha	(Russia) Elizaveta Khudaiberdieva / Nikita Nazarov	(Russia) Sofia Shevchenko / Igor Eremenko

Small medals awarded to the skaters who achieve the highest short program or rhythm dance placements in each discipline:

Discipline	Gold	Silver	Bronze
Men	(United States) Camden Pulkinen	(United States) Tomoki Hiwatashi	(Italy) Daniel Grassl
Ladies	(Russia) Anna Shcherbakova	(Russia) Alexandra Trusova	(United States) Ting Cui
Pairs	(Russia) Polina Kostiukovich / Dmitrii Ialin	(Russia) Apollinariia Panfilova / Dmitry Rylov	(Russia) Anastasia Mishina / Aleksandr Galiamov
Ice dancing	(Canada) Marjorie Lajoie / Zachary Lagha	(Russia) Elizaveta Khudaiberdieva / Nikita Nazarov	(Russia) Sofia Shevchenko / Igor Eremenko

Medals awarded to the skaters who achieve the highest free skating or free dance placements in each discipline:

Discipline	Gold	Silver	Bronze
Men	(Russia) Roman Savosin	(United States) Tomoki Hiwatashi	(Canada) Stephen Gogolev
Ladies	(Russia) Alexandra Trusova	(Russia) Anna Shcherbakova	(United States) Ting Cui
Pairs	(Russia) Anastasia Mishina / Aleksandr Galiamov	(Russia) Apollinariia Panfilova / Dmitry Rylov	(Russia) Polina Kostiukovich / Dmitrii Ialin
Ice dancing	(Canada) Marjorie Lajoie / Zachary Lagha	(Russia) Sofia Shevchenko / Igor Eremenko	(United States) Avonley Nguyen / Vadym Kolesnik

=== Medals by country ===
Table of medals for overall placement:

Rank	Nation	Gold	Silver	Bronze	Total
1	Russia (RUS)	2	4	2	8
2	United States (USA)	1	0	1	2
3	Canada (CAN)	1	0	0	1
4	Italy (ITA)	0	0	1	1
Totals (4 entries)		4	4	4	12
