= 2017–18 national figure skating championships =

2017–2018 national figure skating championships
- Type: National
- Season: 2017–2018
- Previous: 2016–2017
- Next: 2018–2019

National figure skating championships of the 2017–2018 season took place mainly between December 2017 and January 2018. They were held to crown national champions and some competitions served as part of the selection process for international events such as the 2018 Winter Olympics and ISU Figure Skating Championships. Medals may be awarded in the disciplines of men's singles, ladies' singles, pair skating, and ice dancing. A few countries chose to organize their national championships together with their neighbors; the results were subsequently divided into national podiums.

== Competitions ==
Key

Nationals	Other domestic

Date	Event	Type	Level	Disc.	Location	Refs
28–30 September	Master's de Patinage	Other	Sen.-Jun.	All	Villard-de-Lans, France	
5–8 October	New Zealand	Nat.	Sen.-Nov.	M/L/D	Dunedin, New Zealand	
27–28 October	Romanian Champ.	Nat.	Senior	M/L	Otopeni, Romania	
24–26 November	Japan Junior Champ.	Nat.	Junior	All	Maebashi, Japan	
28 Nov. – 4 Dec.	British Championships	Nat.	Sen.-Nov.	All	Sheffield, England	
29 Nov. – 3 Dec.	Skate Canada Challenge	Other	Sen.-Nov.	All	Pierrefonds, Quebec	
1–2 December	Belgian Championships	Nat.	Sen.-Nov.	M/L	Liedekerke, Belgium	
2–3 December	Latvian Championships	Nat.	Sen.-Jun.	M/L/D	Mārupe, Latvia	
9–10 December	Estonian Championships	Nat.	Senior	M/L/D	Tallinn, Estonia	
13 December	Slovenian Championships	Nat.	Sen-Jun	M/L	Kranj, Slovenia	
13–16 December	Italian Championships	Nat.	Sen.-Jun.	All	Milan, Italy	
14–16 December	French Championships	Nat.	Senior	All	Nantes, France	
14–16 December	Austrian Championships	Nat.	Sen.-Nov.	All	Vienna, Austria	
14–17 December	Swedish Championships	Nat.	Sen.-Nov.	All	Skellefteå, Sweden	
15–16 December	Czech/Slovak/Polish/Hungarian	Nat.	Senior	M/L/D	Košice, Slovakia	
15–17 December	Spanish Championships	Nat.	Sen.-Nov.	All	Jaca, Spain	
16–17 December	Belarusian Championships	Nat.	Senior	M/L/D	Minsk, Belarus	
16–17 December	Finnish Championships	Nat.	Sen.-Jun.	M/L/D	Vantaa, Finland	
17–20 December	Ukrainian Championships	Nat.	Senior	All	Kyiv, Ukraine	
19–21 December	Bulgarian Championships	Nat.	Sen.-Nov.	M/L/D	Sofia, Bulgaria	
19–24 December	Russian Championships	Nat.	Senior	All	Saint Petersburg, Russia	
21–24 December	Japan Championships	Nat.	Senior	All	Tokyo, Japan	
22–24 December	Turkish Championships	Nat.	Sen.-Nov.	All	Ankara, Turkey	
23-24 December	Chinese Championships	Nat.	Senior	All	Changchun, China	
29 Dec. – 7 Jan.	U.S. Championships	Nat.	Sen.-Nov.	All	San Jose, California	
1 - 14 January	Norwegian Championships	Nat.			Stavanger, Norway	
5 - 7 January	South Korean Championships	Nat.	Sen.-Jun.	All	Seoul, South Korea	
8 - 14 January	Canadian Championships	Nat.	Sen.-Nov.	All	Vancouver, British Columbia	
Levels: Sen. = Senior; Jun. = Junior; Nov. = Novice; Disciplines: M = Men's singles; L = Ladies' singles; P = Pair skating; D = Ice dancing; All = All four disciplines

== Senior medalists ==
=== Men ===
Men
Nation	Gold	Silver	Bronze	Refs
Australia	Brendan Kerry	Andrew Dodds	Mark Webster	
Austria	Manuel Koll	Albert Mück	Manuel Drechsler	
Belarus	Yakau Zenko	Anton Karpuk	Yauhenii Puzanau	
Belgium	—N/a			
Bulgaria	Niki-Leo Obreikov	Aleksandar Zlatkov	—N/a	
Canada	Patrick Chan	Keegan Messing	Nam Nguyen	
China	Yan Han	Zhang He	Hao Yan	
Czech Republic	Jiří Bělohradský	Matyáš Bělohradský	Petr Kotlařík	
Denmark	—N/a			
Estonia	Daniel Albert Naurits	Samuel Koppel	—N/a	
Finland	Valtter Virtanen	Bela Papp	Roman Galay	
France	Chafik Besseghier	Kévin Aymoz	Romain Ponsart	
Germany	Paul Fentz	Peter Liebers	Catalin Dimitrescu	
Hungary	Alexander Maszljanko	Alexander Borovoj	Máté Böröcz	
Italy	Matteo Rizzo	Ivan Righini	Maurizio Zandron	
Japan	Shoma Uno	Keiji Tanaka	Takahito Mura	
Latvia	Deniss Vasiļjevs	—N/a		
New Zealand	Brian Lee	Michael Durham	—N/a	
Norway	—N/a			
Poland	Ihor Reznichenko	Krzysztof Gała	Olgierd Febbi	
Romania	Dorjan Kecskes	—N/a		
Russia	Mikhail Kolyada	Alexander Samarin	Dmitri Aliev	
Slovakia	Michael Neuman	Jakub Kršňák	Marco Klepoch	
South Korea	Cha Jun-hwan	Kimn Jin-seo	Lee June-hyoung	
Spain	Javier Fernández	Javier Raya	Felipe Montoya	
Sweden	Alexander Majorov	Illya Solomin	Daniel Engelsons	
Switzerland	Stéphane Walker	Nicola Todeschini	Lukas Britschgi	
Turkey	Burak Demirboğa	Engin Ali Artan	Mehmet Çakır	
Ukraine	Yaroslav Paniot	Ivan Pavlov	Ivan Shmuratko	
United Kingdom	Phillip Harris	Peter-James Hallam	Graham Newberry	
United States	Nathan Chen	Ross Miner	Vincent Zhou	

=== Ladies ===
Ladies
Nation	Gold	Silver	Bronze	Refs
Australia	Kailani Craine	Amelia Scarlett Jackson	Katie Pasfield	
Austria	Lara Roth	Natalie Klotz	Sophia Schaller	
Belarus	Aliaksandra Chepeleva	Maria Saldakaeva	Lizaveta Malinouskaya	
Belgium	Loena Hendrickx	Anneliese Van Houdt	—N/a	
Bulgaria	Presiyana Dimitrova	Simona Gospodinova	Svetoslava Ryadkova	
Canada	Gabrielle Daleman	Kaetlyn Osmond	Larkyn Austman	
China	Li Xiangning	Zhao Ziquan	Chen Hongyi	
Czech Republic	Eliška Březinová	Dahyun Ko	Michaela Lucie Hanzlíková	
Denmark	Pernille Sørensen	Emma Frida Andersen	Malene Andersen	
Estonia	Gerli Liinamäe	Kristina Škuleta-Gromova	Eva Lotta Kiibus	
Finland	Emmi Peltonen	Viveca Lindfors	Jenni Saarinen	
France	Maé-Bérénice Méité	Laurine Lecavelier	Léa Serna	
Germany	Nicole Schott	Nathalie Weinzierl	Lea Johanna Dastich	
Hungary	Fruzsina Medgyesi	Ivett Tóth	Daria Jakab	
Italy	Carolina Kostner	Giada Russo	Elisabetta Leccardi	
Japan	Satoko Miyahara	Kaori Sakamoto	Rika Kihira	
Latvia	Diāna Ņikitina	Darja Šatibelko	—N/a	
New Zealand	Brooke Tamepo	Isabella Bardua	Sarah Cullen	
Norway	Camilla Gjersem	—N/a		
Poland	Elżbieta Gabryszak	Oliwia Rzepiel	Coco Colette Kaminski	
Romania	Zselyke Kenez	Irina Preda	—N/a	
Russia	Alina Zagitova	Maria Sotskova	Alena Kostornaia	
Serbia	Antonina Dubinina	—N/a		
Slovakia	Silvia Hugec	Nina Letenayová	Maria Sofia Pucherová	
Slovenia	Dasa Grm	Nina Polsak	Ursa Krusec	
South Korea	You Young	Choi Da-bin	Lim Eun-soo	
Sweden	Anita Östlund	Matilda Algotsson	Josefin Taljegård	
Switzerland	Alexia Paganini	Yoonmi Lehmann	Yasmine Yamada	
Turkey	Sıla Saygı	Sinem Kuyucu	Zeynep Yigit	
Ukraine	Anastasia Arkhipova	Anna Khnychenkova	Anastasia Hozhva	
United Kingdom	Natasha McKay	Karly Robertson	Kristen Spours	
United States	Bradie Tennell	Mirai Nagasu	Karen Chen	

=== Pairs ===
Pairs
Nation	Gold	Silver	Bronze	Refs
Australia	Paris Stephens / Matthew Dodds	—N/a		
Austria	Miriam Ziegler / Severin Kiefer	—N/a		
Canada	Meagan Duhamel / Eric Radford	Julianne Séguin / Charlie Bilodeau	Kirsten Moore-Towers / Michael Marinaro	
China	Yu Xiaoyu / Zhang Hao	Peng Cheng / Jin Yang	Wang Xuehan / Wang Lei	
France	Lola Esbrat / Andrei Novoselov	Cléo Hamon / Denys Strekalin	Coline Keriven / Noël-Antoine Pierre	
Germany	Aljona Savchenko / Bruno Massot	Minerva Fabienne Hase / Nolan Seegert	Annika Hocke / Ruben Blommaert	
Italy	Nicole Della Monica / Matteo Guarise	Valentina Marchei / Ondřej Hotárek	Rebecca Ghilardi / Filippo Ambrosini	
Japan	Miu Suzaki / Ryuichi Kihara	Narumi Takahashi / Ryo Shibata	Riku Miura / Shoya Ichihashi	
Russia	Evgenia Tarasova / Vladimir Morozov	Ksenia Stolbova / Fedor Klimov	Natalia Zabiiako / Alexander Enbert	
South Korea	Kim Kyu-eun / Alex Kam			
Spain	Laura Barquero / Aritz Maestu Babarro	Dorota Broda / Pedro Betegón Martín	—N/a	
Switzerland	Ioulia Chtchetinina / Mikhail Akulov	—N/a		
Ukraine	Sofia Nesterova / Artem Darenskyi	—N/a		
United Kingdom	Zoe Jones / Christopher Boyadji	—N/a		
United States	Alexa Scimeca Knierim / Chris Knierim	Tarah Kayne / Danny O'Shea	Deanna Stellato / Nathan Bartholomay	

=== Ice dancing ===
Ice dancing
Nation	Gold	Silver	Bronze	Refs
Australia	Chantelle Kerry / Andrew Dodds	Micol Carmignani / Mitchell Frencham	—N/a	
Belarus	Viktoria Kavaliova / Yurii Bieliaiev	Anna Kublikova / Yuri Hulitski	—N/a	
Belgium	—N/a			
Canada	Tessa Virtue / Scott Moir	Piper Gilles / Paul Poirier	Kaitlyn Weaver / Andrew Poje	
China	Wang Shiyue / Liu Xinyu	Song Linshu / Sun Zhuoming	Ning Wanqi / Wang Chao	
Czech Republic	Cortney Mansour / Michal Ceska	—N/a		
Denmark	Laurence Fournier Beaudry / Nikolaj Sørensen	—N/a		
Estonia	Viktoria Semenjuk / Artur Gruzdev	Katerina Bunina / German Frolov	—N/a	
Finland	Cecilia Törn / Jussiville Partanen	Juulia Turkkila / Matthias Versluis	Monica Lindors / Juho Pirinen	
France	Gabriella Papadakis / Guillaume Cizeron	Marie-Jade Lauriault / Romain Le Gac	Angélique Abachkina / Louis Thauron	
Germany	Kavita Lorenz / Joti Polizoakis	Katharina Müller / Tim Dieck	Shari Koch / Christian Nüchtern	
Hungary	Anna Yanovskaya / Ádám Lukács	—N/a		
Italy	Anna Cappellini / Luca Lanotte	Charlène Guignard / Marco Fabbri	Jasmine Tessari / Francesco Fioretti	
Japan	Kana Muramoto / Chris Reed	Misato Komatsubara / Timothy Koleto	Rikako Fukase / Aru Tateno	
Latvia	Aurelija Ipolito / Malcolm Jones	—N/a		
Poland	Natalia Kaliszek / Maksym Spodyriev	Justyna Plutowska / Jeremie Flemin	Anastasia Polibina / Radosław Barszczak	
Russia	Ekaterina Bobrova / Dmitri Soloviev	Alexandra Stepanova / Ivan Bukin	Tiffany Zahorski / Jonathan Guerreiro	
Slovakia	Lucie Myslivečková / Lukáš Csölley	—N/a		
South Korea	Yura Min / Alexander Gamelin	—N/a		
Spain	Olivia Smart / Adrià Díaz	Sara Hurtado / Kirill Khaliavin	Celia Robledo / Luis Fenero	
Sweden	Malin Malmberg / Thomas Nordahl	—N/a		
Switzerland	Victoria Manni / Carlo Röthlisberger	—N/a		
Ukraine	Oleksandra Nazarova / Maxim Nikitin	Darya Popova / Volodymyr Byelikov	Yuliia Zhata / Yan Lukouski	
United Kingdom	Penny Coomes / Nicholas Buckland	Lilah Fear / Lewis Gibson	Robynne Tweedale / Joseph Buckland	
United States	Madison Hubbell / Zachary Donohue	Maia Shibutani / Alex Shibutani	Madison Chock / Evan Bates	

== Junior medalists ==
=== Men ===
Junior men
Nation	Gold	Silver	Bronze	Refs
Australia	Darian Kaptich	Giuseppe Triulcio	James Thompson	
Austria	Anton Skoficz	Valentin Eisenbauer	Sebastian Mörtl	
Belarus				
Belgium	Bob Rasschaert	—N/a		
Bulgaria	Radoslav Marinov	Vasil Dimitrov	—N/a	
Canada	Matthew Markell	Corey Circelli	Zoé Duval-Yergeau	
China				
Czech Republic				
Denmark	Daniel Tsion	Nikolaj Mølgaard Pedersen	Lucas Strezlec	
Estonia				
Finland	Benjam Papp	Lauri Lankila	Mikla Rasia	
France				
Germany	Jonathan Hess	Kai Jagoda	Denis Gurdzhi	
Hungary				
Italy	Nik Folini	Gabriele Frangipani	Paolo Balestri	
Japan	Mitsuki Sumoto	Sena Miyake	Tatsuya Tsuboi	
Latvia	Kims Georgs Pavlovs	Daniels Rosciks	Aleksejs Mazalevskis	
New Zealand	Brian Lee	Harrison Bain	Connor McIver	
Norway	—N/a			
Poland				
Romania				
Russia	Alexey Erokhov	Roman Savosin	Artur Danielian	
Slovakia				
South Korea				
Spain	Aleix Gabara Xancó	Gaizka Madejón Cambra	Iker Oyarzabal Albas	
Sweden	Gabriel Folkesson	Nikolaj Majorov	Andreas Nordebäck	
Switzerland				
Turkey	Başar Oktar	Alp Eren Özkan	Ömer Efe Sayıcı	
Ukraine				
United Kingdom	Luke Digby	Josh Brown	Edward Appleby	
United States	Camden Pulkinen	Dinh Tran	Maxim Naumov	

=== Ladies ===
Junior ladies
Nation	Gold	Silver	Bronze	Refs
Australia	Amelia Scarlett Jackson	Jordan Lazarus	Lucy Sori Yun	
Austria	Stefanie Pesendorfer	Sophia Schaller	Olga Mikutina	
Belarus				
Belgium	Laura Balanean	Lisa Van Genck	Loïs Arickx	
Bulgaria	Aleksandra Feygin	Kristina Grigorova	Eliza Pancheva	
Canada	Olivia Gran	Sarah-Maude Blanchard	Victoria Bocknek	
China				
Czech Republic				
Denmark	Jane Iskov	Caroline Oreskov Christoffersen	Josephine Kaersgaard	
Denmark	—N/a			
Estonia				
Finland	Sofia Sula	Vera Stolt	Laura Karhunen	
France				
Germany	Ann-Christin Marold	Franziska Kettl	Tina Helleken	
Hungary				
Italy	Lucrezia Beccari	Lara Naki Gutmann	Marina Piredda	
Japan	Rika Kihira	Mako Yamashita	Nana Araki	
Latvia	Anete Lāce	Nikola Mažgane	Polina Andrejeva	
New Zealand	Nicola Korck	Jojo Hong	Pei-Lin Lee	
Norway	Andrea Lae	Marianne Stålen	Ingrid Vestre	
Poland				
Romania				
Russia	Alexandra Trusova	Alena Kostornaya	Stanislava Konstantinova	
Serbia	Leona Rogić	Nevena Mihajlović	Zona Apostolović	
Slovakia				
South Korea				
Spain	Belen Alvarez	Anna Bertran Gracia	Claudia Justo de Andres	
Sweden	Selma Ihr	Smilla Szalkai	Jelizaveta Kopaca	
Switzerland				
Turkey	Güzide Irmak Bayır	İlayda Bayar	Ekin Saygı	
Ukraine				
United Kingdom	Kristen Spours	Anastasia Vaipan-Law	Anna Litvinenko	
United States	Alysa Liu	Pooja Kalyan	Ting Cui	

=== Pairs ===
Junior pairs
Nation	Gold	Silver	Bronze	Refs
Australia	Kaitlyn Ineson / Tremayne Bevan	—N/a		
Austria	Heidrun Pipal / Erik Pipal	—N/a		
Belgium	—N/a			
Canada	Lori-Ann Matte / Thierry Ferland	Patricia Andrew / Paxton Knott	Gabrielle Levesque / Pier-Alexandre Hudon	
China				
Czech Republic				
Denmark	—N/a			
France				
Germany	—N/a			
Italy	Sara Carli / Marco Pauletti	Giorgia Audenino / Fernando Fossa	—N/a	
Japan	Riku Miura / Shoya Ichihashi	Marin Ono / Kurtis Kazuki Schreiber	—N/a	
Poland				
Russia	Daria Pavliuchenko / Denis Khodykin	Anastasia Mishina / Aleksandr Galiamov	Polina Kostiukovich / Dmitrii Ialin	
Spain	Isabella Gámez / Tòn Cónsul Vivar	—N/a		
Sweden	Greta Crafoord / John Crafoord	—N/a		
Ukraine	Mariya Syplenko / Daniil Ermakov	—N/a		
United Kingdom	Emilia Drury / Aidan Brown	—N/a		
United States	Audrey Lu / Misha Mitrofanov	Sarah Feng / T. J. Nyman	Laiken Lockley / Keenan Prochnow	

=== Ice dancing ===
Junior ice dancing
Nation	Gold	Silver	Bronze	Refs
Australia	Jessica Palfreyman / Charlton Doherty	Varshana Schelling / Liam McIver	—N/a	
Belarus				
Belgium	—N/a			
Canada	Marjorie Lajoie / Zachary Lagha	Olivia McIsaac / Elliott Graham	Ashlynne Stairs / Lee Royer	
China				
Czech Republic	Natálie Taschlerová / Filip Taschler	—N/a		
Denmark	—N/a			
Estonia				
France				
Germany	Ria Schwendinger / Valentin Wunderlich	Charise Matthaei / Maximilian Pfisterer	Lara Luft / Asaf Kazimov	
Hungary	Villő Marton / Danyil Semko	Hanna Jakucs / Alessio Galli	Loréna Bubcsó / Alfréd Sőregi-Niksz	
Italy	Chiara Calderone / Pietro Papetti	Francesca Righi / Aleksei Dubrovin	Sara Campanini / Francesco Riva	
Japan	Haruno Yajima / Daiki Shimazaki	Kiria Hirayama / Kenta Higashi	Ayumi Takanami / Yosimitu Ikeda	
Poland	Oleksandra Borysova / Cezary Zawadzki	Zuzanna Sudnik / Danylo Lykhopok	—N/a	
Russia	Anastasia Skoptcova / Kirill Aleshin	Sofia Shevchenko / Igor Eremenko	Arina Ushakova / Maxim Nekrasov	
Spain	Malene Nichita-Basquín / Jaime García	Léa Mangas / Nicolas Soleihavoup	—N/a	
Sweden	Vendela Bexander / Hugo Linder	—N/a		
Switzerland				
Turkey				
Ukraine				
United Kingdom	Sasha Fear / George Waddell	Emily Rose Brown / James Hernandez	Natalia Paillu Neves / Frank Roselli	
United States	Christina Carreira / Anthony Ponomarenko	Caroline Green / Gordon Green	Chloe Lewis / Logan Bye	
