= Dinh Tran =

American figure skater

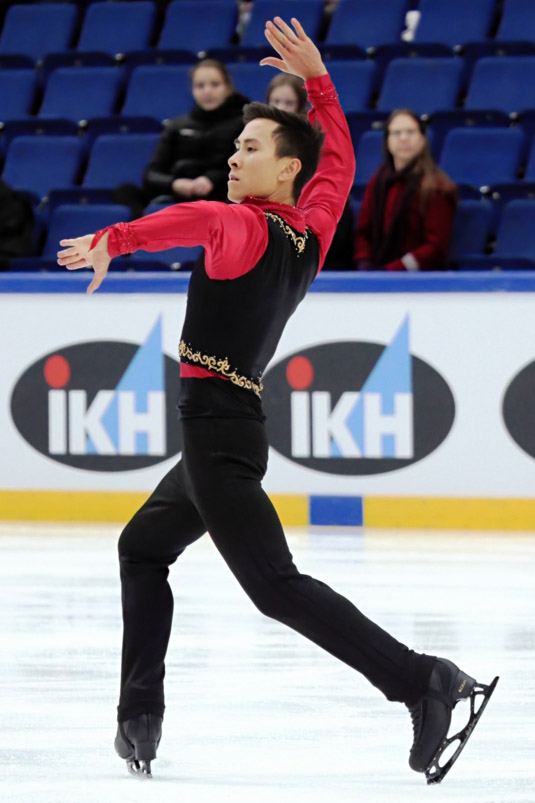
- Tran at the 2022 Finlandia Trophy

Personal information
- Born: June 21, 2001 (age 25) San Francisco, California, U.S.
- Home town: San Francisco, California, U.S.
- Height: 5 ft 5 in (1.66 m)

Figure skating career
- Country: United States
- Coach: Dee Goldstein, Viacheslav Zagorodniuk
- Skating club: SC of San Francisco
- Began skating: 2006

Dinh Tran (born June 21, 2001) is an American figure skater. He is the 2022 Philadelphia Summer International silver medalist and a two-time U.S. national junior silver medalist (2018, 2019).

== Personal life ==
Tran was born on June 21, 2001, in San Francisco, California. His mother, Mimi Hoang, is a physical education teacher. The daughter of a Vietnamese mother and American soldier, she was left with her grandmother and grew up in Saigon, working as a housekeeper from the age of 8, before moving to the U.S. at 18.

Tran was raised in Tenderloin, San Francisco with two older brothers, Phong and Hao, and one younger, Trieu. His parents divorced when he was 14 years old. Growing up, he took flute lessons and performed with his school's jazz band. He received a full scholarship to attend Stuart Hall High School, graduating in 2020. He subsequently enrolled at California State University, Long Beach as a computer science major but soon switched to mechanical engineering.

== Career ==
=== Early years ===
Tran was first introduced to ice skating at a birthday party. He started taking lessons at the Yerba Buena ice rink, which offered free lessons to children from Tenderloin. Later, his family was granted a free membership at the Skating Club of San Francisco and also found a local sponsor.

Early in his career, he was coached by Jeffrey Crandell. Tran sustained a sprained ankle and shin splints in the 2017–18 season. In October 2017, he debuted on the ISU Junior Grand Prix (JGP) series, placing twelfth in Poland. He won silver in the junior men's event at the 2018 U.S. Championships.

Tran sprained his ankle three more times in the fall of 2018. At the 2019 U.S. Championships, he repeated as junior silver medalist.

=== Senior career ===
By the 2019–20 season, Tran was training under Dee Goldstein. He placed ninth at his JGP assignment. He qualified to the senior men's event at the 2020 U.S. Championships, where he finished eighth.

Making his senior international debut, he placed ninth at the 2021 U.S. International Figure Skating Classic in September. In January, he finished eighth at the 2022 U.S. Championships.

In August 2022, Tran won silver at the Philadelphia Summer International. He then appeared at two Challenger competitions, placing thirteenth at the 2022 CS Lombardia Trophy and seventh at the 2022 CS Finlandia Trophy. Following Eric Sjoberg's withdrawal, Tran was invited to his first Grand Prix event, the 2022 Skate America, where he finished tenth.

== Programs ==
Season	Short program	Free skating	Exhibition
2023–2024	L-O-V-E by Nat King Cole choreo. by Misha Ge	Tron: Legacy by Daft Punk choreo. by Misha Ge	
2022–2023	Asturias (Leyenda) by Isaac Albéniz performed by Marcin Patrzałek choreo. by Misha Ge	The Matrix choreo. by Misha Ge	Runaway Baby by Bruno Mars
2021–2022	Malagueña by Ernesto Lecuona performed by Paco de Lucía choreo. by Misha Ge	Fly Me to the Moon by Michael Bublé choreo. by Misha Ge	
2020–2021 2019–2020	Puss in Boots by Henry Jackman choreo. by Pasquale Camerlengo	Sherlock Holmes by Hans Zimmer choreo. by Pasquale Camerlengo	
2018–2019	Let's Dance (InFiction String Remix) by David Bowie choreo. by Alex Chang	Golden Age; Volcano; Run Boy Run by Woodkid choreo. by Alex Chang	
2017–2018	Exogenesis: Symphony Part 1 by Muse	Poeta by Vicente Amigo	

== Competitive highlights ==
GP: Grand Prix; CS: Challenger Series; JGP: Junior Grand Prix

=== Senior and junior ===
International
Event	17–18	18–19	19–20	20–21	21–22	22–23
GP Skate America						10th
CS Finlandia						13th
CS Lombardia						7th
Philadelphia						2nd
U.S. Classic					9th	
Universiade						9th
International: Junior
JGP Austria		10th				
JGP Poland	12th		9th			
National
U.S. Championships	2nd J	2nd J	8th	10th	8th	16th

== Detailed results ==
=== Senior level ===
2022–23 season
Date	Event	SP	FS	Total
January 23–29, 2023	2023 U.S. Championships	16; 60.63	13; 126.55	16; 187.18
January 13–15, 2023	2023 Winter Universiade	17; 60.69	8; 137.90	9; 198.59
October 21–23, 2022	2022 Skate America	11; 64.99	10; 134.69	10; 199.68
October 4–9, 2022	2022 CS Finlandia Trophy	15; 62.52	12; 128.82	13; 191.34
September 16–19, 2022	2022 CS Lombardia Trophy	8; 60.53	7; 125.61	7; 186.14
August 7, 2022	2022 Philadelphia Summer International	2; 71.54	1; 127.11	2; 198.65
2021–22 season
Date	Event	SP	FS	Total
January 3–9, 2022	2022 U.S. Championships	9; 71.18	7; 144.54	8; 215.72
September 14–17, 2021	2021 U.S. International Classic	8; 65.77	10; 110.95	9; 176.72
2020–21 season
Date	Event	SP	FS	Total
January 11–21, 2021	2021 U.S. Championships	10; 74.03	11; 136.76	10; 210.79
2019–20 season
Date	Event	SP	FS	Total
Jan. 20–26, 2020	2020 U.S. Championships	11; 71.86	8; 149.02	8; 220.88

=== Junior level ===
2019–20 season
Date	Event	SP	FS	Total
September 18–21, 2019	2019 JGP Poland	12; 56.88	9; 118.35	9; 175.23
2018–19 season
Date	Event	SP	FS	Total
Jan 19–27, 2019	2019 U.S. Championships	4; 64.84	2; 131.19	2; 196.03
Aug 29 – September 1, 2018	2018 JGP Austria	10; 60.07	10; 109.63	10; 169.70
2017–18 season
Date	Event	SP	FS	Total
December 29, 2017 – January 8, 2018	2018 U.S. Championships	2; 67.28	2; 132.67	2; 199.95
October 4–7, 2017	2017 JGP Poland	10; 60.53	12; 112,38	12; 172.91
