= 2018 U.S. Figure Skating Championships =

Figure skating competition

- Type: National Championship
- Date: December 29 – January 8
- Season: 2017–18
- Location: San Jose, California
- Host: U.S. Figure Skating
- Venue: SAP Center

Champions
- Men's singles: Nathan Chen (S); Camden Pulkinen (J)
- Ladies' singles: Bradie Tennell (S); Alysa Liu (J)
- Pairs: Alexa Scimeca Knierim / Chris Knierim (S); Audrey Lu / Misha Mitrofanov (J)
- Ice dance: Madison Hubbell / Zachary Donohue (S); Christina Carreira / Anthony Ponomarenko (J)
- Previous: 2017 U.S. Championships
- Next: 2019 U.S. Championships

The 2018 Prudential U.S. Figure Skating Championships were held from December 29, 2017 – January 8, 2018 at the SAP Center in San Jose, California. Medals were awarded in the disciplines of men's singles, ladies singles, pair skating, and ice dance at the senior, junior, novice, intermediate, and juvenile levels. The results were part of the U.S. selection criteria for the 2018 Winter Olympics, 2018 Four Continents Championships, 2018 World Junior Championships, and the 2018 World Championships.

San Jose was announced as the host in August 2016.

== Qualifying ==
Competitors qualified at regional and sectional competitions held from October to November 2017 or earned a bye. Skaters must place in the top 4 in order to earn a spot at the National Figure Skating Championships.

| Date | Event | Type | Location | Results |
|---|---|---|---|---|
| October 4–8, 2017 | North Atlantic | Regional | Hackensack, New Jersey | |
| October 4–8, 2017 | Upper Great Lakes | Regional | Blaine, Minnesota | |
| October 11–15, 2017 | Northwest Pacific | Regional | Eugene, Oregon | |
| October 11–15, 2017 | South Atlantic | Regional | Aston, Pennsylvania | |
| October 11–15, 2017 | Southwestern | Regional | Fort Collins, Colorado | |
| October 11–15, 2017 | Southwest Pacific | Regional | Ontario, California | |
| October 18–22, 2017 | New England | Regional | Westborough, Massachusetts | |
| October 18–22, 2017 | Eastern Great Lakes | Regional | Antioch, Tennessee | |
| October 18–22, 2017 | Central Pacific | Regional | Salt Lake City, Utah | |
| November 15–19, 2017 | Eastern | Sectional | Boxborough, Massachusetts | |
| November 15–19, 2017 | Midwestern | Sectional | Bloomington, Minnesota | |
| November 15–19, 2017 | Pacific Coast | Sectional | Spokane, Washington | |
| December 29, 2017 – January 7, 2018 | U.S. Championships | Final | San Jose, California | |

In late December 2017, U.S. Figure Skating published the list of skaters who had qualified or received a bye.

== Schedule ==
The competition took place over ten days. All times are in PST.

| Date | Time | Event | Segment |
|---|---|---|---|
| December 29 | 9:10 AM | Juvenile girls | Free skate |
| December 29 | 10:45 AM | Juvenile boys | Free skate |
| December 29 | 12:30 PM | Juvenile pairs | Free skate |
| December 29 | 3:00 PM | Intermediate pairs | Short program |
| December 29 | 4:45 PM | Intermediate ladies | Short program |
| December 29 | 6:30 PM | Intermediate men | Short program |
| December 30 | 2:45 PM | Intermediate pairs | Free skate |
| December 30 | 4:45 PM | Intermediate ladies | Free skate |
| December 30 | 6:30 PM | Intermediate men | Free skate |
| December 31 | 10:30 AM | Juvenile dance | Pattern dance 1 (Foxtrot) |
| December 31 | 11:45 AM | Juvenile dance | Pattern dance 2 (Cha Cha) |
| December 31 | 7:00 PM | Junior pairs | Short program |
| December 31 | 8:55 PM | Junior ladies | Short program |
| January 1 | 9:30 AM | Intermediate dance | Pattern dance 1 (Tango) |
| January 1 | 10:45 AM | Intermediate dance | Pattern dance 2 (Fourteenstep) |
| January 1 | 12:10 PM | Junior men | Short program |
| January 1 | 2:15 PM | Juvenile dance | Free dance |
| January 1 | 4:05 PM | Novice dance | Pattern dance 1 (Argentine tango) |
| January 1 | 5:20 PM | Novice dance | Pattern dance 2 (Quickstep) |
| January 1 | 6:45 PM | Novice pairs | Short program |
| January 2 | 8:50 AM | Novice ladies | Short program |
| January 2 | 10:30 AM | Novice men | Short program |
| January 2 | 12:10 PM | Intermediate dance | Free dance |
| January 2 | 12:30 PM | Junior pairs | Free skate |
| January 2 | 3:30 PM | Novice pairs | Free skate |
| January 2 | 6:15 PM | Novice dance | Free dance |
| January 2 | 7:50 PM | Junior ladies | Free skate |
| January 3 | 8:15 AM | Novice ladies | Free skate |
| January 3 | 10:15 AM | Junior men | Free skate |
| January 3 | 1:00 PM | Junior dance | Short dance |
| January 3 | 3:15 PM | Novice men | Free skate |
| January 3 | 6:35 PM | Senior ladies | Short program |
| January 4 | 9:50 AM | Junior dance | Free dance |
| January 4 | 1:00 PM | Senior pairs | Short program |
| January 4 | 5:40 PM | Senior men | Short program |
| January 5 | 1:10 PM | Senior dance | Short dance |
| January 5 | 3:45 PM | Senior ladies | Free skate |
| January 6 | 11:45 AM | Senior pairs | Free skate |
| January 6 | 3:45 PM | Senior men | Free skate |
| January 7 | 12:30 PM | Senior dance | Free dance |

== Medal summary ==
=== Senior ===
| Discipline | Gold | Silver | Bronze | Pewter |
|---|---|---|---|---|
| Men | Nathan Chen | Ross Miner | Vincent Zhou | Adam Rippon |
| Ladies | Bradie Tennell | Mirai Nagasu | Karen Chen | Ashley Wagner |
| Pairs | Alexa Scimeca Knierim / Chris Knierim | Tarah Kayne / Danny O'Shea | Deanna Stellato / Nathan Bartholomay | Ashley Cain-Gribble / Timothy LeDuc |
| Ice dance | Madison Hubbell / Zachary Donohue | Maia Shibutani / Alex Shibutani | Madison Chock / Evan Bates | Kaitlin Hawayek / Jean-Luc Baker |

=== Junior ===
| Discipline | Gold | Silver | Bronze | Pewter |
|---|---|---|---|---|
| Men | Camden Pulkinen | Dinh Tran | Maxim Naumov | Ryan Dunk |
| Ladies | Alysa Liu | Pooja Kalyan | Ting Cui | Hanna Harrell |
| Pairs | Audrey Lu / Misha Mitrofanov | Sarah Feng / TJ Nyman | Laiken Lockley / Keenan Prochnow | Nadine Wang / Spencer Howe |
| Ice dance | Christina Carreira / Anthony Ponomarenko | Caroline Green / Gordon Green | Chloe Lewis / Logan Bye | Eliana Gropman / Ian Somerville |

=== Novice ===
| Discipline | Gold | Silver | Bronze | Pewter |
|---|---|---|---|---|
| Men | Goku Endo | Max Lake | Nicholas Hsieh | Lucas Altieri |
| Ladies | Beverly Zhu | Emilea Zingas | Violeta Ushakova | Calista Choi |
| Pairs | Jade Hom / Franz-Peter Jerosch | Joanna Hubbart / William Hubbart | Masha Mokhova / Ivan Mokhov | Ellie McClellan / Jim Garbutt |
| Ice dance | Katarina Wolfkostin / Howard Zhao | Gianna Buckley / Jeffrey Chen | Caroline Liu / Kenan Slevira | Elizabeth Tkachenko / Alexei Kiliakov |

=== Intermediate ===
| Discipline | Gold | Silver | Bronze | Pewter |
|---|---|---|---|---|
| Men | Maxim Zharkov | Matthew Nielsen | Liam Kapeikis | William Annis |
| Ladies | Indi Cha | Alyssa Chan | Arianna Concepcion | Alena Budko |
| Pairs | Zoe Larson / Nick Hubbart | Cate Fleming / Jedidiah Isbell | Katie Luong / Nathan Luong | Sydney Flaum / Cayden McKenzie-Cook |
| Ice dance | Elliana Peal / Ethan Peal | Claire Cain / Andrei Davydov | Anna Gissibl / Alexander Colucci | Nastia Efimova / Jonathan Zhao |

=== Juvenile ===
| Discipline | Gold | Silver | Bronze | Pewter |
|---|---|---|---|---|
| Men | Keita Horiko | Jacob Sanchez | Nhat-Viet Nguyen | Andriy Kratyuk |
| Ladies | Isabeau Levito | Clara Kim | Macie Rolf | Madeleine Park |
| Pairs | Natasha Mishkutionok / Daniel Tioumentsev | Nadia Wang / Jaden Schwab | Dalila DeLaura / Ryan Xie | Megan Voigt / Levon Davis |
| Ice dance | Jenna Hauer / Benjamin Starr | Zoe Sensenbrenner / Matthew Sperry | Kristina Bland / Gabriel Francis | Emma L'Esperance / Mika Amdour |

== Senior results ==
=== Men ===
| Rank | Name | Total | SP | | FS | |
|---|---|---|---|---|---|---|
| 1 | Nathan Chen | 315.23 | 1 | 104.45 | 1 | 210.78 |
| 2 | Ross Miner | 274.51 | 6 | 88.91 | 2 | 185.60 |
| 3 | Vincent Zhou | 273.83 | 5 | 89.02 | 3 | 184.81 |
| 4 | Adam Rippon | 268.34 | 2 | 96.52 | 4 | 171.82 |
| 5 | Grant Hochstein | 255.31 | 4 | 92.18 | 5 | 163.13 |
| 6 | Jason Brown | 253.68 | 3 | 93.23 | 6 | 160.45 |
| 7 | Timothy Dolensky | 236.33 | 7 | 85.06 | 9 | 151.27 |
| 8 | Alexander Johnson | 232.62 | 10 | 79.60 | 8 | 153.02 |
| 9 | Max Aaron | 224.20 | 12 | 74.95 | 10 | 149.25 |
| 10 | Alexei Krasnozhon | 223.58 | 8 | 82.58 | 13 | 141.00 |
| 11 | Jimmy Ma | 222.41 | 11 | 75.28 | 11 | 147.13 |
| 12 | Tomoki Hiwatashi | 217.53 | 15 | 63.48 | 7 | 154.05 |
| 13 | Andrew Torgashev | 217.01 | 9 | 81.32 | 14 | 135.69 |
| 14 | Sean Rabbitt | 214.53 | 13 | 73.29 | 12 | 141.24 |
| 15 | Jordan Moeller | 180.21 | 20 | 55.35 | 15 | 124.86 |
| 16 | Ben Jalovick | 178.33 | 19 | 56.12 | 16 | 122.21 |
| 17 | Daniel Kulenkamp | 177.95 | 18 | 60.15 | 17 | 117.80 |
| 18 | Emmanuel Savary | 177.13 | 14 | 64.65 | 18 | 112.48 |
| 19 | Sebastien Payannet | 172.89 | 16 | 61.29 | 20 | 111.60 |
| 20 | Scott Dyer | 172.04 | 17 | 60.17 | 19 | 111.87 |
| 21 | Kevin Shum | 163.33 | 21 | 52.04 | 21 | 111.29 |

=== Ladies ===
| Rank | Name | Total | SP | | FS | |
|---|---|---|---|---|---|---|
| 1 | Bradie Tennell | 219.51 | 1 | 73.79 | 1 | 145.72 |
| 2 | Mirai Nagasu | 213.84 | 2 | 73.09 | 2 | 140.75 |
| 3 | Karen Chen | 198.59 | 3 | 69.48 | 4 | 129.11 |
| 4 | Ashley Wagner | 196.19 | 5 | 65.94 | 3 | 130.25 |
| 5 | Mariah Bell | 192.34 | 6 | 65.18 | 6 | 127.16 |
| 6 | Starr Andrews | 189.91 | 8 | 62.55 | 5 | 127.36 |
| 7 | Angela Wang | 188.01 | 4 | 67.00 | 7 | 121.01 |
| 8 | Amber Glenn | 168.06 | 9 | 61.62 | 9 | 106.44 |
| 9 | Courtney Hicks | 165.48 | 11 | 57.81 | 8 | 107.67 |
| 10 | Tessa Hong | 156.86 | 13 | 55.82 | 11 | 101.04 |
| 11 | Caroline Zhang | 156.38 | 10 | 60.29 | 14 | 96.09 |
| 12 | Franchesca Chiera | 150.99 | 14 | 53.85 | 13 | 97.14 |
| 13 | Hannah Miller | 149.14 | 12 | 57.57 | 16 | 91.57 |
| 14 | Kaitlyn Nguyen | 146.20 | 17 | 46.30 | 12 | 99.90 |
| 15 | Brynne McIsaac | 145.54 | 20 | 43.97 | 10 | 101.57 |
| 16 | Emmy Ma | 138.02 | 18 | 45.55 | 15 | 92.47 |
| 17 | Megan Wessenberg | 131.73 | 22 | 40.90 | 17 | 90.83 |
| 18 | Katie McBeath | 124.64 | 15 | 48.53 | 18 | 76.11 |
| 19 | Vivian Le | 122.60 | 16 | 46.65 | 19 | 75.95 |
| 20 | Emily Chan | 104.43 | 19 | 44.79 | 20 | 59.64 |
| WD | Polina Edmunds | 63.78 | 7 | 63.78 | withdrew from competition | |
| WD | Ashley Lin | 42.33 | 21 | 42.33 | withdrew from competition | |

=== Pairs ===
| Rank | Name | Total | SP | | FS | |
|---|---|---|---|---|---|---|
| 1 | Alexa Scimeca Knierim / Chris Knierim | 206.60 | 1 | 71.10 | 1 | 135.50 |
| 2 | Tarah Kayne / Danny O'Shea | 200.80 | 2 | 68.93 | 2 | 131.87 |
| 3 | Deanna Stellato / Nathan Bartholomay | 197.65 | 3 | 67.84 | 3 | 129.81 |
| 4 | Ashley Cain-Gribble / Timothy LeDuc | 187.14 | 8 | 60.03 | 4 | 127.11 |
| 5 | Haven Denney / Brandon Frazier | 186.32 | 4 | 63.63 | 5 | 122.69 |
| 6 | Marissa Castelli / Mervin Tran | 182.38 | 6 | 60.75 | 6 | 121.63 |
| 7 | Chelsea Liu / Brian Johnson | 167.47 | 5 | 62.35 | 9 | 105.12 |
| 8 | Jessica Pfund / Joshua Santillan | 163.62 | 7 | 60.52 | 10 | 103.10 |
| 9 | Jessica Calalang / Zack Sidhu | 162.23 | 12 | 50.43 | 7 | 111.80 |
| 10 | Erika Smith / AJ Reiss | 159.03 | 11 | 50.95 | 8 | 108.08 |
| 11 | Nica Digerness / Danny Neudecker | 154.10 | 9 | 53.78 | 11 | 100.32 |
| 12 | Winter Deardorff / Max Settlage | 145.66 | 10 | 51.15 | 13 | 94.51 |
| 13 | Caitlin Fields / Ernie Utah Stevens | 142.12 | 13 | 45.49 | 12 | 96.63 |
| 14 | Alexandria Yao / Jacob Simon | 128.12 | 15 | 40.97 | 14 | 87.15 |
| 15 | Allison Timlen / Justin Highgate-Brutman | 126.05 | 14 | 41.70 | 15 | 84.35 |

=== Ice dance ===
| Rank | Name | Total | SD | | FD | |
|---|---|---|---|---|---|---|
| 1 | Madison Hubbell / Zachary Donohue | 197.12 | 2 | 79.10 | 2 | 118.02 |
| 2 | Maia Shibutani / Alex Shibutani | 196.93 | 1 | 82.33 | 3 | 114.60 |
| 3 | Madison Chock / Evan Bates | 196.60 | 3 | 77.61 | 1 | 118.99 |
| 4 | Kaitlin Hawayek / Jean-Luc Baker | 187.61 | 4 | 73.18 | 4 | 114.43 |
| 5 | Rachel Parsons / Michael Parsons | 176.07 | 5 | 72.69 | 6 | 103.38 |
| 6 | Lorraine McNamara / Quinn Carpenter | 175.19 | 6 | 69.16 | 5 | 106.03 |
| 7 | Elliana Pogrebinsky / Alex Benoit | 167.98 | 7 | 66.41 | 7 | 101.57 |
| 8 | Alexandra Aldridge / Daniel Eaton | 153.93 | 8 | 61.21 | 8 | 92.72 |
| 9 | Karina Manta / Joseph Johnson | 151.00 | 9 | 58.29 | 9 | 92.71 |
| 10 | Julia Biechler / Damian Dodge | 136.37 | 10 | 54.53 | 10 | 81.84 |
| 11 | Elicia Reynolds / Stephen Reynolds | 110.92 | 11 | 40.92 | 11 | 70.00 |
| 12 | Cassidy Klopstock / Jacob Schedl | 89.28 | 12 | 37.16 | 12 | 52.12 |
| 13 | Ashley Bain / Oleg Altukhov | 79.42 | 13 | 31.17 | 13 | 48.25 |

== Junior results ==
=== Men ===
| Rank | Name | Total | SP | | FS | |
|---|---|---|---|---|---|---|
| 1 | Camden Pulkinen | 219.29 | 1 | 67.88 | 1 | 151.41 |
| 2 | Dinh Tran | 199.95 | 2 | 67.28 | 2 | 132.67 |
| 3 | Maxim Naumov | 179.00 | 3 | 64.07 | 4 | 114.93 |
| 4 | Ryan Dunk | 172.68 | 10 | 53.43 | 3 | 119.25 |
| 5 | Tony Lu | 166.57 | 4 | 62.43 | 7 | 104.14 |
| 6 | Alex Wellman | 160.69 | 8 | 56.23 | 6 | 104.46 |
| 7 | Paul Yeung | 158.71 | 11 | 53.30 | 5 | 105.41 |
| 8 | Sasha Lunin | 148.67 | 9 | 54.86 | 8 | 93.81 |
| 9 | Peter Liu | 143.63 | 5 | 58.33 | 11 | 85.30 |
| 10 | Patrick Frohling | 138.43 | 12 | 52.22 | 10 | 86.21 |
| 11 | Kendrick Weston | 136.83 | 6 | 58.10 | 12 | 78.73 |
| 12 | Justin Wichmann | 135.95 | 13 | 48.05 | 9 | 87.90 |
| 13 | Luke Ferrante | 129.58 | 7 | 56.48 | 13 | 73.10 |

=== Ladies ===
| Rank | Name | Total | SP | | FS | |
|---|---|---|---|---|---|---|
| 1 | Alysa Liu | 184.16 | 1 | 63.83 | 1 | 120.33 |
| 2 | Pooja Kalyan | 166.53 | 4 | 54.55 | 3 | 111.98 |
| 3 | Ting Cui | 165.51 | 11 | 45.55 | 2 | 119.96 |
| 4 | Hanna Harrell | 154.36 | 5 | 52.10 | 4 | 102.26 |
| 5 | Emily Zhang | 149.83 | 2 | 56.97 | 8 | 92.86 |
| 6 | Gabriella Izzo | 148.04 | 3 | 55.19 | 7 | 93.05 |
| 7 | Angelina Huang | 143.84 | 6 | 51.27 | 9 | 92.57 |
| 8 | Akari Nakahara | 143.41 | 7 | 49.12 | 6 | 94.29 |
| 9 | Audrey Shin | 140.50 | 10 | 46.05 | 5 | 94.45 |
| 10 | Emma Coppess | 139.30 | 8 | 48.08 | 10 | 91.22 |
| 11 | Lily Sun | 137.75 | 9 | 47.38 | 11 | 90.37 |
| 12 | Jenna Shi | 114.50 | 12 | 44.20 | 12 | 70.30 |

=== Pairs ===
| Rank | Name | Total | SP | | FS | |
|---|---|---|---|---|---|---|
| 1 | Audrey Lu / Misha Mitrofanov | 173.31 | 1 | 60.80 | 1 | 112.51 |
| 2 | Sarah Feng / TJ Nyman | 155.57 | 3 | 58.37 | 2 | 97.20 |
| 3 | Laiken Lockley / Keenan Prochnow | 153.04 | 2 | 58.67 | 3 | 94.37 |
| 4 | Nadine Wang / Spencer Howe | 135.96 | 5 | 46.58 | 4 | 89.38 |
| 5 | Elli Kopmar / Jonah Barrett | 132.90 | 4 | 52.18 | 5 | 80.72 |
| 6 | Ainsley Peterson / Griffin Schwab | 124.21 | 6 | 45.86 | 6 | 78.35 |
| 7 | Sarah Rose / Ian Meyh | 115.54 | 9 | 39.48 | 7 | 76.06 |
| 8 | Evelyn Grace Hanns / Kristofer Ogren | 114.62 | 7 | 43.85 | 9 | 70.77 |
| 9 | Meiryla Findley / Matthew Rounis | 113.82 | 8 | 40.74 | 8 | 73.08 |
| 10 | Eliana Secunda / Blake Eisenach | 100.74 | 10 | 37.14 | 10 | 63.60 |
| 11 | Sapphire Jaeckel / Matthew Scoralle | 88.92 | 11 | 35.35 | 12 | 53.57 |
| 12 | Cora DeWyre / Jacob Nussle | 85.44 | 12 | 27.56 | 11 | 57.88 |
| 13 | Juliette Erickson / Nathan Grundhofer | 64.86 | 13 | 24.67 | 13 | 40.19 |

=== Ice dance ===
| Rank | Name | Total | SD | | FD | |
|---|---|---|---|---|---|---|
| 1 | Christina Carreira / Anthony Ponomarenko | 159.18 | 1 | 68.70 | 1 | 90.48 |
| 2 | Caroline Green / Gordon Green | 146.72 | 2 | 63.14 | 2 | 83.58 |
| 3 | Chloe Lewis / Logan Bye | 143.21 | 3 | 62.14 | 3 | 81.07 |
| 4 | Eliana Gropman / Ian Somerville | 138.90 | 4 | 61.13 | 5 | 77.77 |
| 5 | Avonley Nguyen / Vadym Kolesnik | 134.31 | 7 | 54.02 | 4 | 80.29 |
| 6 | Emma Gunter / Caleb Wein | 132.89 | 5 | 56.31 | 6 | 76.58 |
| 7 | Jocelyn Haines / James Koszuta | 126.59 | 6 | 55.69 | 7 | 70.90 |
| 8 | Alina Efimova / Alexander Petrov | 120.92 | 8 | 52.06 | 8 | 68.86 |
| 9 | Katarina DelCamp / Maxwell Gart | 116.65 | 9 | 50.26 | 10 | 66.39 |
| 10 | Isabelle Amoia / Luca Becker | 116.08 | 10 | 49.50 | 9 | 66.58 |
| 11 | Sophia Elder / Christopher Elder | 111.02 | 11 | 49.14 | 12 | 61.88 |
| 12 | Molly Cesanek / Nikolay Usanov | 106.60 | 13 | 44.04 | 11 | 62.56 |
| 13 | Allie Rose / JT Michel | 103.55 | 12 | 45.11 | 13 | 58.44 |

== International team selections ==
=== Winter Olympics ===
U.S. Figure Skating began announcing the team for the 2018 Winter Olympics on January 6, 2018.

| | Men | Ladies | Pairs | Ice dance |
|---|---|---|---|---|
| | Nathan Chen | Karen Chen | Alexa Scimeca Knierim / Chris Knierim | Madison Chock / Evan Bates |
| | Adam Rippon | Mirai Nagasu | | Madison Hubbell / Zachary Donohue |
| | Vincent Zhou | Bradie Tennell | | Maia Shibutani / Alex Shibutani |
| 1st alt. | Jason Brown | Ashley Wagner | Tarah Kayne / Danny O'Shea | Kaitlin Hawayek / Jean-Luc Baker |
| 2nd alt. | Ross Miner | Mariah Bell | Deanna Stellato / Nathan Bartholomay | Lorraine McNamara / Quinn Carpenter |
| 3rd alt. | Max Aaron | Angela Wang | Ashley Cain-Gribble / Timothy LeDuc | Rachel Parsons / Michael Parsons |

The selections for the team event at the Olympics were as follows:

| | Men | Ladies | Pairs | Ice dance |
|---|---|---|---|---|
| SP/SD | Nathan Chen | Bradie Tennell | Alexa Scimeca Knierim / Chris Knierim | Maia Shibutani / Alex Shibutani |
| FS/FD | Adam Rippon | Mirai Nagasu | Alexa Scimeca Knierim / Chris Knierim | Maia Shibutani / Alex Shibutani |

=== World Championships ===
U.S. Figure Skating began announcing the team for the 2018 World Championships on January 6, 2018.

| | Men | Ladies | Pairs | Ice dance |
|---|---|---|---|---|
| | Nathan Chen | ~~Karen Chen~~ (withdrew) | Tarah Kayne / Danny O'Shea | Madison Chock / Evan Bates |
| | ~~Adam Rippon~~ (withdrew) | Mirai Nagasu | Alexa Scimeca Knierim / Chris Knierim | Madison Hubbell / Zachary Donohue |
| | Vincent Zhou | Bradie Tennell | | Maia Shibutani / Alex Shibutani |
| 1st alt. | Jason Brown | ~~Ashley Wagner~~ (withdrew) | Deanna Stellato / Nathan Bartholomay | Kaitlin Hawayek / Jean-Luc Baker |
| 2nd alt. | Ross Miner | Mariah Bell (called up) | Ashley Cain-Gribble / Timothy LeDuc | Lorraine McNamara / Quinn Carpenter |
| 3rd alt. | Max Aaron (called up) | Angela Wang | Haven Denney / Brandon Frazier | Rachel Parsons / Michael Parsons |

=== Four Continents ===
U.S. Figure Skating began announcing the team for the 2018 Four Continents Championships on January 6, 2018.

| | Men | Ladies | Pairs | Ice dance |
|---|---|---|---|---|
| | Max Aaron | Starr Andrews | Ashley Cain-Gribble / Timothy LeDuc | Kaitlin Hawayek / Jean-Luc Baker |
| | Jason Brown | Mariah Bell | Tarah Kayne / Danny O'Shea | Lorraine McNamara / Quinn Carpenter |
| | ~~Ross Miner~~ (withdrew) | ~~Ashley Wagner~~ (withdrew) | Deanna Stellato / Nathan Bartholomay | Rachel Parsons / Michael Parsons |
| 1st alt. | Grant Hochstein (called up) | Angela Wang (called up) | Haven Denney / Brandon Frazier | Elliana Pogrebinsky / Alex Benoit |
| 2nd alt. | Timothy Dolensky | Amber Glenn | Marissa Castelli / Mervin Tran | Karina Manta / Joseph Johnson |
| 3rd alt. | Alexander Johnson | Courtney Hicks | Chelsea Liu / Brian Johnson | Julia Biechler / Damian Dodge |

=== World Junior Championships ===
U.S. Figure Skating began announcing the team for the 2018 World Junior Championships on January 6, 2018.

| | Men | Ladies | Pairs | Ice dance |
|---|---|---|---|---|
| | Tomoki Hiwatashi | ~~Starr Andrews~~ (withdrew) | Audrey Lu / Misha Mitrofanov | Christina Carreira / Anthony Ponomarenko |
| | Alexei Krasnozhon | Ting Cui | Sarah Feng / TJ Nyman | Caroline Green / Gordon Green |
| | Camden Pulkinen | | | Chloe Lewis / Logan Bye |
| Alt. | Maxim Naumov | Hanna Harrell | Laiken Lockley / Keenan Prochnow | Eliana Gropman / Ian Somerville |
| Alt. | Andrew Torgashev | Tessa Hong | Nadine Wang / Spencer Howe | Avonley Nguyen / Vadym Kolesnik |
| Alt. | Dinh Tran | Emmy Ma (called up) | Elli Kopmar / Jonah Barrett | Emma Gunter / Caleb Wein |
