= 2021 U.S. International Figure Skating Classic =

Figure skating competition

2021 U.S. International Classic
- Type: ISU event
- Date: September 14 – 17
- Season: 2021–22
- Location: Norwood, Massachusetts, United States
- Host: U.S. Figure Skating
- Venue: Skating Club of Boston

Champions
- Men's singles: (Czech Republic) Michal Březina
- Women's singles: (Russia) Alexandra Trusova
- Ice dance: (United States) Madison Hubbell / Zachary Donohue
- Previous: 2019 CS U.S. International Classic
- Next: 2022 CS U.S. Classic

The 2021 U.S. International Figure Skating Classic was held on September 14–17, 2021 in Norwood, Massachusetts. Medals were awarded in the disciplines of men's singles, women's singles, and ice dance. This was the first time since 2013 that the competition was not included as part of the ISU Challenger Series, as well as the first time that pair skating was not included as a discipline.

== Entries ==
U.S. Figure Skating posted the preliminary entries on August 26, 2021.

Country	Men	Women	Ice dance
Australia	—	—	Chantelle Kerry / Andrew Dodds
Czech Republic	Michal Březina	—	—
Ecuador	—	Katherine Ona	—
India	—	Tara Prasad	—
Israel	Mark Gorodnitsky	Taylor Morris	Shira Ichilov / Laurent Abecassis
Israel	Daniel Samohin	—	Mariia Nosovitskaya / Mikhail Nosovitskiy
Mexico	Donovan Carrillo	—	—
Philippines	Christopher Caluza	—	—
Poland	—	—	Jenna Hertenstein / Damian Binkowski
Russia	—	Alexandra Trusova	Diana Davis / Gleb Smolkin
South Korea	—	Park Yeon-jeong	Yura Min / Daniel Eaton
United States	Jimmy Ma	Maxine Bautista	Madison Hubbell / Zachary Donohue
United States	Maxim Naumov	Gabriella Izzo	Lorraine McNamara / Anton Spiridonov
United States	Camden Pulkinen	Paige Rydberg	Eva Pate / Logan Bye
United States	Eric Sjoberg	Sierra Venetta	—
United States	Dinh Tran	—	—

== Results ==
=== Men's singles ===
Rank	Skater	Nation	Total points	SP		FS	
1st place, gold medalist(s)	Michal Březina	Czech Republic	238.65	1	87.48	1	151.17
2nd place, silver medalist(s)	Jimmy Ma	United States	233.58	2	84.07	2	149.51
3rd place, bronze medalist(s)	Eric Sjoberg	United States	221.12	3	78.11	3	143.01
4	Camden Pulkinen	United States	208.99	6	66.84	4	142.15
5	Donovan Carrillo	Mexico	208.41	4	77.48	7	130.93
6	Maxim Naumov	United States	207.39	5	69.99	6	137.40
7	Daniel Samohin	Israel	207.36	7	66.54	5	140.82
8	Mark Gorodnitsky	Israel	186.82	9	64.24	8	122.58
9	Dinh Tran	United States	176.72	8	65.77	10	110.95
10	Christopher Caluza	Philippines	175.64	10	62.03	9	113.61

=== Women's singles ===
Rank	Skater	Nation	Total points	SP		FS	
1st place, gold medalist(s)	Alexandra Trusova	Russia	216.80	1	74.75	1	142.05
2nd place, silver medalist(s)	Park Yeon-jeong	South Korea	212.40	2	71.07	2	141.33
3rd place, bronze medalist(s)	Gabriella Izzo	United States	182.76	3	63.93	3	118.83
4	Sierra Venetta	United States	177.40	4	61.60	4	115.80
5	Paige Rydberg	United States	154.03	5	58.24	5	95.79
6	Taylor Morris	Israel	142.16	6	49.09	6	93.07
7	Maxine Bautista	United States	138.08	7	45.71	7	92.37
8	Tara Prasad	India	129.19	8	44.66	8	84.53
9	Katherine Ona	Ecuador	64.05	9	20.73	9	43.32

=== Ice dance ===
Rank	Team	Nation	Total points	RD		FD	
1st place, gold medalist(s)	Madison Hubbell / Zachary Donohue	United States	207.30	1	84.06	1	123.24
2nd place, silver medalist(s)	Diana Davis / Gleb Smolkin	Russia	190.63	2	75.21	2	115.42
3rd place, bronze medalist(s)	Eva Pate / Logan Bye	United States	171.70	4	67.20	3	104.50
4	Yura Min / Daniel Eaton	South Korea	168.28	3	67.85	5	100.43
5	Lorraine McNamara / Anton Spiridonov	United States	161.82	6	60.06	4	101.76
6	Chantelle Kerry / Andrew Dodds	Australia	152.96	5	61.96	7	91.00
7	Shira Ichilov / Laurent Abecassis	Israel	152.53	7	59.82	6	92.71
8	Mariia Nosovitskaya / Mikhail Nosovitskiy	Israel	139.26	8	50.76	8	88.50
9	Jenna Hertenstein / Damian Binkowski	Poland	115.04	9	44.34	9	70.70
