= 2020 U.S. Figure Skating Championships =

Figure skating competition

- Type: National Championship
- Date: January 20 – 26
- Season: 2019–20
- Location: Greensboro, North Carolina
- Host: U.S. Figure Skating
- Venue: Greensboro Coliseum Complex

Champions
- Men's singles: Nathan Chen (Senior) & Maxim Naumov (Junior)
- Women's singles: Alysa Liu (Senior) & Lindsay Thorngren (Junior)
- Pairs: Alexa Scimeca Knierim and Chris Knierim (Senior) & Kate Finster and Balázs Nagy (Junior)
- Ice dance: Madison Chock and Evan Bates (Senior) & Avonley Nguyen and Vadym Kolesnik (Junior)
- Previous: 2019 U.S. Championships
- Next: 2021 U.S. Championships

The 2020 U.S. Figure Skating Championships were held from January 20–26, 2020 at the Greensboro Coliseum Complex in Greensboro, North Carolina. Medals were awarded in the disciplines of men's singles, ladies' singles, pair skating, and ice dance at the senior and junior levels. The results were part of the U.S. selection criteria for the 2020 Four Continents Championships, 2020 World Junior Championships, and the 2020 World Championships.

Greensboro was announced as the host in November 2018. The city previously hosted the event in 2011 and 2015.

== Qualifying ==
U.S. Figure Skating implemented a new qualifying structure beginning from the 2019–20 season. Competitors qualified through the National Qualifying Series (NQS), Regional (singles) and Sectional (pairs/ice dance) Challenges, and Sectional (singles) and U.S. (pairs/ice dance) Finals, held from June to November 2019, or earned a bye. The NQS is not mandatory, but the top six singles athletes in each section may earn a bye to the Sectional Singles Final, and the top three teams/couples in pairs and ice dance may earn a bye to the U.S. Final in their respective disciplines. The top four finishers at the Sectional Finals (singles) and the top twelve finishers at the U.S. Finals (pairs/ice dance) earned a spot at the National Figure Skating Championships.

Juvenile, intermediate, and novice skaters qualified for the National High Performance Development Team and Camp in lieu of participating at U.S. Championships.

| Date | Event | Type | Location | Results |
|---|---|---|---|---|
| June–September 2019 | National Qualifying Series (NQS) | | Various cities | Details |
| October 2–6, 2019 | South Atlantic | Regional Challenge | Aston, Pennsylvania | Details |
| October 2–6, 2019 | Eastern Ice Dance/Pairs | Sectional Challenge | Aston, Pennsylvania | Details |
| October 2–6, 2019 | Eastern Great Lakes | Regional Challenge | Lansing, Michigan | Details |
| October 2–6, 2019 | Midwestern Ice Dance | Sectional Challenge | Lansing, Michigan | Details |
| October 2–6, 2019 | Northwest Pacific | Regional Challenge | Mountlake Terrace, Washington | Details |
| October 16–20, 2019 | Southwestern | Regional Challenge | Colorado Springs, Colorado | Details |
| October 16–20, 2019 | Midwestern Pairs | Sectional Challenge | Colorado Springs, Colorado | Details |
| October 16–20, 2019 | Southwest Pacific | Regional Challenge | Irvine, California | Details |
| October 16–20, 2019 | Pacific Coast Pairs | Sectional Challenge | Irvine, California | Details |
| October 23–27, 2019 | New England | Regional Challenge | Westborough, Massachusetts | Details |
| October 23–27, 2019 | North Atlantic | Regional Challenge | Westborough, Massachusetts | Details |
| October 23–27, 2019 | Upper Great Lakes | Regional Challenge | Saint Paul, Minnesota | Details |
| October 23–27, 2019 | Central Pacific | Regional Challenge | Salt Lake City, Utah | Details |
| October 23–27, 2019 | Pacific Coast Ice Dance | Sectional Challenge | Salt Lake City, Utah | Details |
| November 12–16, 2019 | Eastern | Sectional Final | Hyannis, Massachusetts | Details |
| November 12–16, 2019 | U.S. Ice Dance Final | U.S. Final | Hyannis, Massachusetts | Details |
| November 12–16, 2019 | Midwestern | Sectional Final | Allen, Texas | Details |
| November 12–16, 2019 | U.S. Pairs Final | U.S. Final | Allen, Texas | Details |
| November 12–16, 2019 | Pacific Coast | Sectional Final | Wenatchee, Washington | Details |
| January 20–26, 2020 | U.S. Championships | Championship | Greensboro, North Carolina | Details |

=== Minimum TES requirements ===
In the senior division, all competitors that qualify through their placement at a Sectional Singles Final, the U.S. Pairs Final, or the U.S. Dance Final, must have met a minimum combined Technical Elements Score (TES) during the season to compete at the U.S. Figure Skating Championships.

Minimum technical scores (TES)
| Discipline | Combined |
| Men | 92 |
| Ladies | 75 |
| Pairs | 68 |
| Ice dance | 65 |
May be attained at any official NQS event, a Regional or Sectional Challenge, a Sectional or U.S. Final, or any international competition

== Entries ==
A list of qualified skaters was published on November 26, 2019.

=== Seniors ===
Several qualified skaters were unable to compete due to failure to achieve the minimum TES: Andrew Austin, Ben Jalovick, Tony Lu, and Jun Hong Chen in men's singles, Megan Wessenberg in ladies' singles, and Brynne McIsaac / Mark Sadusky in pairs.

| Men | Ladies | Pairs | Ice dance |
|---|---|---|---|
| Jason Brown | Starr Andrews | Ashley Cain-Gribble / Timothy LeDuc | Christina Carreira / Anthony Ponomarenko |
| Nathan Chen | Maxine Marie Bautista | Jessica Calalang / Brian Johnson | Madison Chock / Evan Bates |
| Ryan Dunk | Mariah Bell | ~~Emily Chan / Spencer Akira Howe~~ (withdrew) | Caroline Green / Michael Parsons |
| Tomoki Hiwatashi | Karen Chen | Haven Denney / Brandon Frazier | Kaitlin Hawayek / Jean-Luc Baker |
| William Hubbart | ~~Ting Cui~~ (withdrew) | Nica Digerness / Danny Neudecker | Madison Hubbell / Zachary Donohue |
| Joonsoo Kim | Alex Evans | Tarah Kayne / Danny O'Shea | Lorraine McNamara / Quinn Carpenter |
| Alexei Krasnozhon | Amber Glenn | Alexa Scimeca Knierim / Chris Knierim | Bailey Melton / Ryan O'Donnell |
| Jimmy Ma | Gracie Gold | Laiken Lockley / Keenan Prochnow | Eva Pate / Logan Bye |
| Jordan Moeller | Caitlin Ha | Audrey Lu / Misha Mitrofanov | Livvy Shilling / Alexander Petrov |
| Yaroslav Paniot | ~~Hanna Harrell~~ (withdrew) | Maria Mokhova / Ivan Mokhov | |
| Camden Pulkinen | Courtney Hicks | Jessica Pfund / Joshua Santillan | |
| Sean Rabbitt | Rena Ikenishi | Olivia Serafini / Mervin Tran | |
| Emmanuel Savary | Gabriella Izzo | Allison Timlen / Justin Highgate-Brutman | |
| Andrew Torgashev | Sarah Jung | | |
| Dinh Tran | Alysa Liu | | |
| Vincent Zhou | ~~Emilia Murdock~~ (withdrew) | | |
| | Alyssa Rich | | |
Paige Rydberg
Bradie Tennell
Sierra Venetta
Emily Zhang

=== Juniors ===
Names with an asterisk (*) denote novice skaters.

| Men | Ladies | Pairs | Ice dance |
|---|---|---|---|
| Lucas Altieri | Lara Annunziata | Sarah Burden / Jake Pagano | Ella Ales / Daniel Tsarik |
| Goku Endo | Elsa Cheng* | Sydney Cooke / Timmy Chapman | Hilary Asher / Kyle Pearson |
| Chase Finster | Calista Choi | Winter Deardorff / Mikhail Johnson | Oona Brown / Gage Brown |
| Nicolas Hsieh | Hazel Collier* | Kate Finster / Balázs Nagy | Molly Cesanek / Yehor Yehorov |
| Joseph Kang | Mia Eckels | Sydney Flaum / Alex Wellman | Katarina DelCamp / Ian Somerville |
| Liam Kapeikis | Hannah Herrera* | Cate Fleming / Jedidiah Isbell | Isabella Flores / Adam Bouaziz |
| Joseph Klein* | Tamnhi Huynh* | Analise Gonzalez / Franz-Peter Jerosch | Layla Karnes / Kenan Slevira |
| Kai Kovar* | Isabelle Inthisone | ~~Evelyn Grace Hanns / Jim Garbutt~~ (withdrew) | Angela Ling / Caleb Wein |
| Seth Kurogi | Mia Kalin | ~~Grace Knoop / Blake Eisenach~~ (withdrew) | Avonley Nguyen / Vadym Kolesnik |
| ~~Ilia Malinin~~ (withdrew) | Michelle Lee* | Isabelle Martins / Ryan Bedard | ~~Anna Nicklas / Max Ryan~~ (withdrew) |
| Daniel Martynov* | Isabeau Levito* | Anastasiia Smirnova / Danil Siianytsia | Cordelia Pride / Benjamin Lawless |
| Samuel Mindra* | Jessica Lin | Arianna Varvoutis / Derrick Griffin | Samantha Ritter / Jim Wang |
| Maxim Naumov | Maryn Pierce | | Breelie Taylor / Tyler Vollmer |
| Matthew Nielsen | Noelle Rosa | | Elizabeth Tkachenko / Alexei Kiliakov |
| Jacob Sanchez* | Ellen Slavicek | | Katarina Wolfkostin / Jeffrey Chen |
| David Shapiro | Lindsay Thorngren | | |
| Eric Sjoberg | Mauryn Tyack | | |
| Daniel Turchin | Kate Wang | | |
| Robert Yampolsky* | | | |

==== Novice ====
The top two novice finishers at each Sectional in men's and ladies' singles were added to the junior event at U.S. Championships.

| Sectional | | Men | Ladies |
|---|---|---|---|
| Eastern | 1 | Robert Yampolsky | Isabeau Levito |
| Eastern | 2 | Jacob Sanchez | Hazel Collier |
| Midwestern | 1 | Joseph Klein | Elsa Cheng |
| Midwestern | 2 | Daniel Martynov | Tamnhi Huynh |
| Pacific Coast | 1 | Samuel Mindra | Michelle Lee |
| Pacific Coast | 2 | Kai Kovar | Hannah Herrera |

=== Changes to preliminary entries ===
| Date | Discipline | Withdrew | Added | Reason/Other notes | Refs |
|---|---|---|---|---|---|
| December 22 | Senior ladies | Ting Cui | N/A | Injury (right ankle) | |
| January 4 | Junior ice dance | Anna Nicklas / Max Ryan | Breelie Taylor / Tyler Vollmer | | |
| January 13 | Senior ladies | Hanna Harrell | N/A | Injury recovery | |
| January 13 | Junior pairs | Grace Knoop / Blake Eisenach | N/A | | |
| January 16 | Senior ladies | Emilia Murdock | N/A | | |
| January 16 | Senior pairs | Emily Chan / Spencer Akira Howe | N/A | | |
| January 16 | Junior men | Ilia Malinin | N/A | | |
| January 16 | Junior pairs | Evelyn Grace Hanns / Jim Garbutt | N/A | | |

== Medal summary ==
=== Senior ===
| Discipline | Gold | Silver | Bronze | Pewter |
|---|---|---|---|---|
| Men | Nathan Chen | Jason Brown | Tomoki Hiwatashi | Vincent Zhou |
| Ladies | Alysa Liu | Mariah Bell | Bradie Tennell | Karen Chen |
| Pairs | Alexa Scimeca Knierim / Chris Knierim | Jessica Calalang / Brian Johnson | Tarah Kayne / Danny O'Shea | Ashley Cain-Gribble / Timothy LeDuc |
| Ice dance | Madison Chock / Evan Bates | Madison Hubbell / Zachary Donohue | Kaitlin Hawayek / Jean-Luc Baker | Christina Carreira / Anthony Ponomarenko |

=== Junior ===
| Discipline | Gold | Silver | Bronze | Pewter |
|---|---|---|---|---|
| Men | Maxim Naumov | Eric Sjoberg | Liam Kapeikis | Lucas Altieri |
| Ladies | Lindsay Thorngren | Isabeau Levito | Calista Choi | Isabelle Inthisone |
| Pairs | Kate Finster / Balazs Nagy | Anastasiia Smirnova / Danil Siianytsia | Winter Deardorff / Mikhail Johnson | Cate Fleming / Jedidiah Isbell |
| Ice dance | Avonley Nguyen / Vadym Kolesnik | Katarina Wolfkostin / Jeffrey Chen | Oona Brown / Gage Brown | Molly Cesanek / Yehor Yehorov |

== Senior results ==
=== Senior men ===
| Rank | Name | Total points | SP | | FS | |
|---|---|---|---|---|---|---|
| 1 | Nathan Chen | 330.17 | 1 | 114.13 | 1 | 216.04 |
| 2 | Jason Brown | 292.88 | 2 | 100.99 | 2 | 191.89 |
| 3 | Tomoki Hiwatashi | 278.08 | 5 | 94.21 | 3 | 183.87 |
| 4 | Vincent Zhou | 275.23 | 4 | 94.82 | 4 | 180.41 |
| 5 | Andrew Torgashev | 260.64 | 3 | 97.87 | 5 | 162.77 |
| 6 | Alexei Krasnozhon | 241.32 | 6 | 80.71 | 6 | 160.61 |
| 7 | Camden Pulkinen | 236.08 | 7 | 79.19 | 7 | 156.89 |
| 8 | Dinh Tran | 220.88 | 11 | 71.86 | 8 | 149.02 |
| 9 | Sean Rabbitt | 213.46 | 8 | 77.71 | 9 | 135.75 |
| 10 | Yaroslav Paniot | 209.79 | 9 | 77.10 | 10 | 132.69 |
| 11 | Ryan Dunk | 199.45 | 14 | 67.15 | 11 | 132.30 |
| 12 | William Hubbart | 195.87 | 13 | 69.11 | 12 | 126.76 |
| 13 | Jimmy Ma | 193.85 | 12 | 71.54 | 13 | 122.31 |
| 14 | Jordan Moeller | 191.25 | 10 | 71.87 | 14 | 119.38 |
| 15 | Joonsoo Kim | 177.03 | 15 | 60.13 | 15 | 116.90 |

=== Senior women ===
| Rank | Name | Total points | SP | | FS | |
|---|---|---|---|---|---|---|
| 1 | Alysa Liu | 235.52 | 2 | 75.40 | 1 | 160.12 |
| 2 | Mariah Bell | 225.21 | 3 | 73.22 | 2 | 151.99 |
| 3 | Bradie Tennell | 220.86 | 1 | 78.96 | 3 | 141.90 |
| 4 | Karen Chen | 193.65 | 5 | 70.41 | 4 | 123.24 |
| 5 | Amber Glenn | 186.57 | 4 | 73.16 | 9 | 113.42 |
| 6 | Starr Andrews | 181.78 | 7 | 65.86 | 6 | 115.92 |
| 7 | Sierra Venetta | 176.37 | 11 | 57.98 | 5 | 118.39 |
| 8 | Courtney Hicks | 175.28 | 9 | 60.25 | 7 | 115.03 |
| 9 | Gabriella Izzo | 174.41 | 6 | 65.94 | 11 | 108.47 |
| 10 | Rena Ikenishi | 171.81 | 12 | 57.47 | 8 | 114.34 |
| 11 | Maxine Marie Bautista | 171.46 | 10 | 59.47 | 10 | 111.99 |
| 12 | Gracie Gold | 161.75 | 13 | 54.51 | 12 | 107.24 |
| 13 | Emily Zhang | 158.36 | 15 | 52.48 | 13 | 105.88 |
| 14 | Paige Rydberg | 150.12 | 8 | 60.82 | 16 | 89.30 |
| 15 | Sarah Jung | 149.38 | 17 | 51.09 | 14 | 98.29 |
| 16 | Alex Evans | 142.70 | 14 | 53.53 | 17 | 89.17 |
| 17 | Caitlin Ha | 139.37 | 16 | 51.48 | 18 | 87.89 |
| 18 | Alyssa Rich | 138.54 | 18 | 45.25 | 15 | 93.29 |

=== Senior pairs ===
| Rank | Team | Total points | SP | | FS | |
|---|---|---|---|---|---|---|
| 1 | Alexa Scimeca Knierim / Chris Knierim | 216.15 | 1 | 77.06 | 2 | 139.09 |
| 2 | Jessica Calalang / Brian Johnson | 213.57 | 3 | 68.86 | 1 | 146.01 |
| 3 | Tarah Kayne / Danny O'Shea | 204.07 | 2 | 70.35 | 3 | 133.72 |
| 4 | Ashley Cain-Gribble / Timothy LeDuc | 197.12 | 4 | 67.56 | 4 | 128.26 |
| 5 | Haven Denney / Brandon Frazier | 186.25 | 6 | 61.33 | 5 | 124.92 |
| 6 | Audrey Lu / Misha Mitrofanov | 181.49 | 5 | 65.06 | 6 | 116.43 |
| 7 | Olivia Serafini / Mervin Tran | 171.21 | 7 | 61.08 | 7 | 110.13 |
| 8 | Jessica Pfund / Joshua Santillan | 165.93 | 8 | 58.48 | 8 | 107.45 |
| 9 | Nica Digerness / Danny Neudecker | 164.12 | 9 | 57.95 | 9 | 106.17 |
| 10 | Laiken Lockley / Keenan Prochnow | 147.07 | 12 | 50.86 | 10 | 96.21 |
| 11 | Maria Mokhova / Ivan Mokhov | 143.29 | 11 | 51.50 | 11 | 91.79 |
| 12 | Allison Timlen / Justin Highgate-Brutman | 135.10 | 10 | 55.60 | 12 | 79.50 |

=== Senior ice dance ===
| Rank | Team | Total points | RD | | FD | |
|---|---|---|---|---|---|---|
| 1 | Madison Chock / Evan Bates | 221.86 | 1 | 87.63 | 1 | 134.23 |
| 2 | Madison Hubbell / Zachary Donohue | 217.19 | 2 | 86.31 | 2 | 130.88 |
| 3 | Kaitlin Hawayek / Jean-Luc Baker | 201.16 | 3 | 82.59 | 3 | 118.57 |
| 4 | Christina Carreira / Anthony Ponomarenko | 194.16 | 4 | 78.02 | 4 | 116.14 |
| 5 | Caroline Green / Michael Parsons | 180.25 | 5 | 77.42 | 5 | 102.83 |
| 6 | Lorraine McNamara / Quinn Carpenter | 173.67 | 6 | 75.79 | 6 | 97.88 |
| 7 | Eva Pate / Logan Bye | 155.82 | 7 | 60.07 | 7 | 95.75 |
| 8 | Livvy Shilling / Alexander Petrov | 133.93 | 8 | 56.24 | 8 | 77.69 |
| 9 | Bailey Melton / Ryan O'Donnell | 96.02 | 9 | 39.47 | 9 | 56.55 |

== Junior results ==
=== Junior men ===
| Rank | Name | Total points | SP | | FS | |
|---|---|---|---|---|---|---|
| 1 | Maxim Naumov | 206.92 | 1 | 70.75 | 2 | 136.17 |
| 2 | Eric Sjoberg | 202.38 | 6 | 62.97 | 1 | 139.41 |
| 3 | Liam Kapeikis | 189.15 | 2 | 68.12 | 4 | 121.03 |
| 4 | Lucas Altieri | 187.94 | 4 | 65.55 | 3 | 122.39 |
| 5 | Nicholas Hsieh | 183.54 | 5 | 65.20 | 5 | 118.34 |
| 6 | Joseph Kang | 177.80 | 3 | 67.84 | 7 | 109.96 |
| 7 | Chase Finster | 171.98 | 8 | 61.73 | 6 | 110.25 |
| 8 | Matthew Nielsen | 165.59 | 9 | 61.51 | 9 | 104.08 |
| 9 | David Shapiro | 165.39 | 12 | 58.69 | 8 | 106.70 |
| 10 | Samuel Mindra | 164.51 | 7 | 62.48 | 11 | 102.03 |
| 11 | Kai Kovar | 162.26 | 11 | 58.90 | 10 | 103.36 |
| 12 | Daniel Martynov | 158.54 | 13 | 56.63 | 12 | 101.91 |
| 13 | Joseph Klein | 155.98 | 15 | 55.83 | 13 | 100.15 |
| 14 | Robert Yampolsky | 147.62 | 16 | 50.48 | 14 | 97.14 |
| 15 | Goku Endo | 146.94 | 10 | 60.08 | 18 | 86.86 |
| 16 | Daniel Turchin | 145.09 | 14 | 55.93 | 17 | 89.16 |
| 17 | Jacob Sanchez | 142.19 | 17 | 49.21 | 15 | 92.98 |
| 18 | Seth Kurogi | 139.75 | 18 | 47.60 | 16 | 92.15 |

=== Junior women ===
| Rank | Name | Total points | SP | | FS | |
|---|---|---|---|---|---|---|
| 1 | Lindsay Thorngren | 183.76 | 2 | 59.66 | 1 | 124.10 |
| 2 | Isabeau Levito | 179.47 | 3 | 59.18 | 2 | 120.29 |
| 3 | Calista Choi | 177.05 | 1 | 61.82 | 3 | 115.23 |
| 4 | Isabelle Inthisone | 165.34 | 4 | 58.80 | 4 | 106.54 |
| 5 | Kate Wang | 160.88 | 6 | 54.85 | 5 | 106.03 |
| 6 | Tamnhi Huynh | 155.44 | 12 | 50.15 | 6 | 105.29 |
| 7 | Elsa Cheng | 151.68 | 5 | 55.26 | 7 | 96.42 |
| 8 | Maryn Pierce | 144.32 | 8 | 52.17 | 9 | 92.15 |
| 9 | Ellen Slavicek | 143.58 | 10 | 50.91 | 8 | 92.67 |
| 10 | Jessica Lin | 137.95 | 15 | 47.15 | 10 | 90.80 |
| 11 | Lara Annunziata | 137.36 | 9 | 51.40 | 13 | 85.96 |
| 12 | Noelle Rosa | 137.24 | 11 | 50.29 | 12 | 86.95 |
| 13 | Mia Kalin | 131.80 | 7 | 52.19 | 17 | 79.61 |
| 14 | Mauryn Tyack | 128.70 | 14 | 47.18 | 16 | 81.52 |
| 15 | Hannah Herrera | 126.60 | 16 | 44.32 | 15 | 82.28 |
| 16 | Hazel Collier | 125.90 | 17 | 43.47 | 14 | 82.43 |
| 17 | Mia Eckels | 123.52 | 18 | 34.32 | 11 | 89.20 |
| 18 | Michelle Lee | 120.80 | 13 | 48.33 | 18 | 72.47 |

=== Junior pairs ===
| Rank | Team | Total points | SP | | FS | |
|---|---|---|---|---|---|---|
| 1 | Kate Finster / Balazs Nagy | 169.37 | 1 | 63.89 | 2 | 105.48 |
| 2 | Anastasiia Smirnova / Danil Siianytsia | 163.04 | 3 | 54.56 | 1 | 108.48 |
| 3 | Winter Deardorff / Mikhail Johnson | 149.47 | 2 | 56.60 | 3 | 92.87 |
| 4 | Cate Fleming / Jedidiah Isbell | 131.58 | 4 | 48.56 | 4 | 83.02 |
| 5 | Isabelle Martins / Ryan Bedard | 119.94 | 9 | 38.05 | 5 | 81.89 |
| 6 | Sydney Cooke / Timmy Chapman | 115.58 | 5 | 41.98 | 6 | 73.60 |
| 7 | Sydney Flaum / Alex Wellman | 111.84 | 7 | 38.38 | 7 | 73.46 |
| 8 | Sarah Burden / Jake Pagano | 109.04 | 6 | 40.26 | 8 | 68.78 |
| 9 | Analise Gonzalez / Franz-Peter Jerosch | 104.20 | 8 | 38.26 | 9 | 65.94 |
| 10 | Arianna Varvoutis / Derrick Griffin | 97.72 | 10 | 33.11 | 10 | 64.61 |

=== Junior ice dance ===
| Rank | Team | Total points | RD | | FD | |
|---|---|---|---|---|---|---|
| 1 | Avonley Nguyen / Vadym Kolesnik | 184.38 | 1 | 74.49 | 1 | 109.89 |
| 2 | Katarina Wolfkostin / Jeffrey Chen | 161.39 | 4 | 60.93 | 2 | 100.46 |
| 3 | Oona Brown / Gage Brown | 160.54 | 3 | 64.91 | 3 | 95.63 |
| 4 | Molly Cesanek / Yehor Yehorov | 159.09 | 2 | 66.13 | 4 | 92.96 |
| 5 | Katarina DelCamp / Ian Somerville | 148.59 | 5 | 60.75 | 5 | 87.84 |
| 6 | Angela Ling / Caleb Wein | 135.76 | 6 | 56.90 | 7 | 78.86 |
| 7 | Elizabeth Tkachenko / Alexei Kiliakov | 134.06 | 7 | 54.91 | 6 | 79.15 |
| 8 | Ella Ales / Daniel Tsarik | 131.09 | 8 | 54.31 | 8 | 76.78 |
| 9 | Layla Karnes / Kenan Slevira | 127.78 | 9 | 53.33 | 9 | 74.45 |
| 10 | Samantha Ritter / Jim Wang | 114.94 | 10 | 46.47 | 10 | 68.47 |
| 11 | Cordelia Pride / Benjamin Lawless | 104.44 | 11 | 44.56 | 11 | 59.88 |
| 12 | Hilary Asher / Kyle Pearson | 98.15 | 13 | 38.40 | 12 | 59.75 |
| 13 | Isabella Flores / Adam Bouaziz | 93.33 | 12 | 41.04 | 13 | 52.29 |
| 14 | Breelie Taylor / Tyler Vollmer | 83.31 | 14 | 34.93 | 14 | 48.38 |

== International team selections ==
=== World Championships ===
The 2020 World Figure Skating Championships will be held in Montreal, Quebec, Canada from March 16–22, 2020. U.S. Figure Skating announced the team on January 26.

| | Men | Ladies | Pairs | Ice dance |
|---|---|---|---|---|
| | Jason Brown | Mariah Bell | Ashley Cain-Gribble / Timothy LeDuc | Madison Chock / Evan Bates |
| | Nathan Chen | Bradie Tennell | ~~Alexa Scimeca Knierim / Chris Knierim~~ (withdrew) | Kaitlin Hawayek / Jean-Luc Baker |
| | Vincent Zhou | | | Madison Hubbell / Zachary Donohue |
| 1st alt. | Tomoki Hiwatashi | Karen Chen | Jessica Calalang / Brian Johnson (called up) | Christina Carreira / Anthony Ponomarenko |
| 2nd alt. | Andrew Torgashev | Amber Glenn | Tarah Kayne / Danny O'Shea | Caroline Green / Michael Parsons |
| 3rd alt. | Camden Pulkinen | Starr Andrews | Haven Denney / Brandon Frazier | Lorraine McNamara / Quinn Carpenter |

=== Four Continents Championships ===
The 2020 Four Continents Figure Skating Championships will be held in Seoul, South Korea from February 4–9, 2020. U.S. Figure Skating announced the team on January 26.

| | Men | Ladies | Pairs | Ice dance |
|---|---|---|---|---|
| | Jason Brown | Karen Chen | Jessica Calalang / Brian Johnson | Madison Chock / Evan Bates |
| | Tomoki Hiwatashi | Amber Glenn | Tarah Kayne / Danny O'Shea | Kaitlin Hawayek / Jean-Luc Baker |
| | Camden Pulkinen | Bradie Tennell | Alexa Scimeca Knierim / Chris Knierim | Madison Hubbell / Zachary Donohue |
| 1st alt. | Alexei Krasnozhon | Starr Andrews | Haven Denney / Brandon Frazier | Christina Carreira / Anthony Ponomarenko |
| 2nd alt. | | Gabriella Izzo | Audrey Lu / Misha Mitrofanov | Caroline Green / Michael Parsons |
| 3rd alt. | | | Olivia Serafini / Mervin Tran | Lorraine McNamara / Quinn Carpenter |

=== World Junior Championships ===
Commonly referred to as "Junior Worlds", the 2020 World Junior Figure Skating Championships will take place in Tallinn, Estonia from March 2–8, 2020. U.S. Figure Skating announced the men's and ladies' selection camp roster on January 26. The entire team was announced on January 29.

| | Men | Ladies | Pairs | Ice dance |
|---|---|---|---|---|
| | Ilia Malinin | Starr Andrews | Winter Deardorff / Mikhail Johnson | Oona Brown / Gage Brown |
| | Maxim Naumov | Alysa Liu | Kate Finster / Balazs Nagy | Avonley Nguyen / Vadym Kolesnik |
| | Andrew Torgashev | Lindsay Thorngren | Anastasiia Smirnova / Danil Siianytsia | Katarina Wolfkostin / Jeffrey Chen |
| 1st alt. | Dinh Tran | Audrey Shin | Cate Fleming / Jedidah Isbell | Molly Cesanek / Yehor Yehorov |
| 2nd alt. | Eric Sjoberg | Gabriella Izzo | | Katarina DelCamp / Ian Somerville |
| 3rd alt. | Lucas Altieri | Isabelle Inthisone | | Angela Ling / Caleb Wein |
| 4th alt. | Liam Kapeikis | Calista Choi | | |

=== Winter Youth Olympics ===
The 2020 Winter Youth Olympics were held in Lausanne, Switzerland from January 10–15, 2020. The team was announced on December 17, 2019, as the U.S. Championships were held after the Winter Youth Olympics.

| | Men | Ladies | Pairs | Ice dance |
|---|---|---|---|---|
| | Liam Kapeikis | ~~Hanna Harrell~~ (withdrew) | Cate Fleming / Jedidiah Isbell | Katarina Wolfkostin / Jeffrey Chen |
| | ~~Ilia Malinin~~ (withdrew) | Audrey Shin | | |
| Alt. | | Kate Wang (called up) | | |
