= Maxim Naumov =

American figure skater (born 2001)

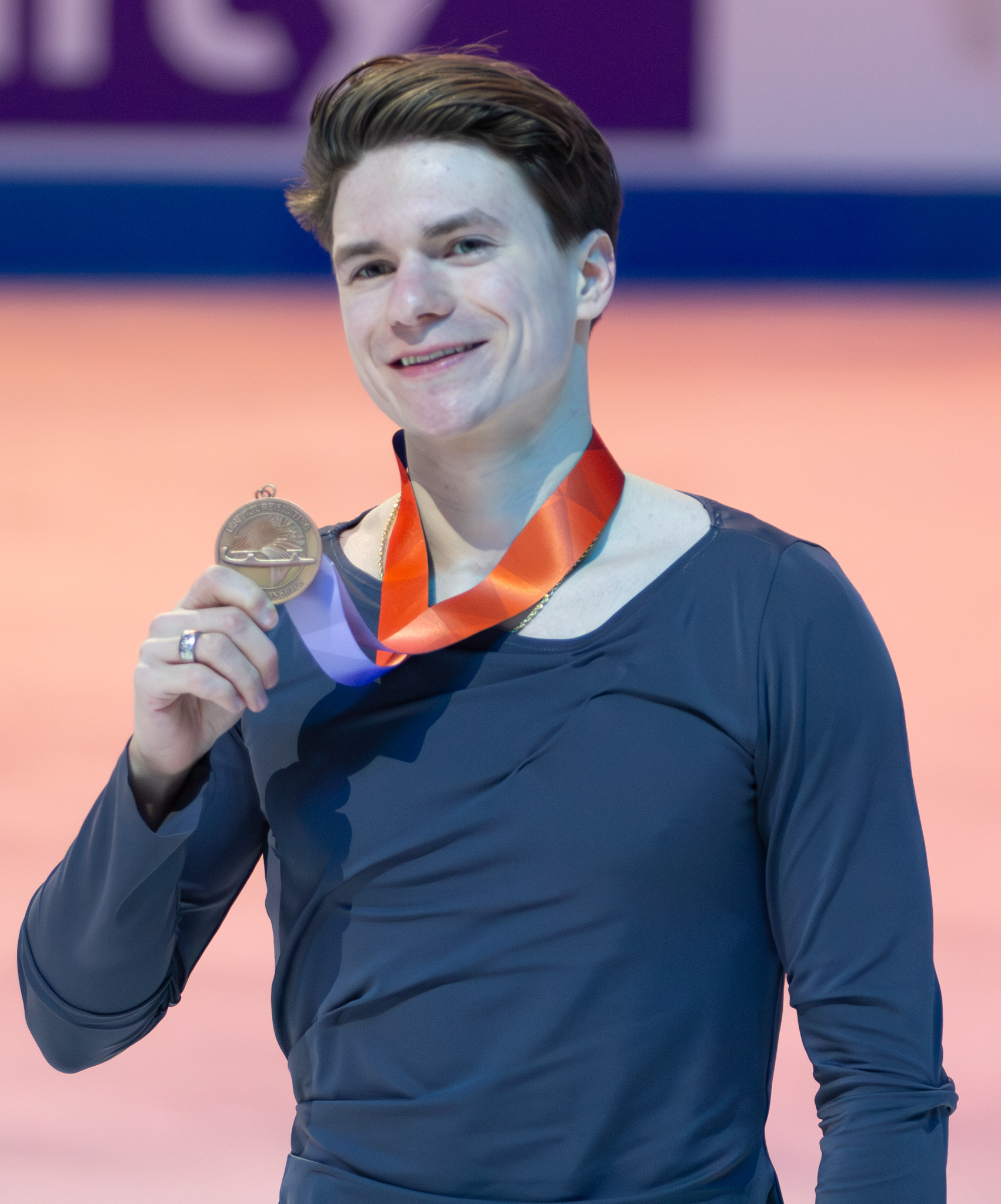
- Naumov at the 2026 U.S. Championships

Personal information
- Born: August 1, 2001 (age 25) Hartford, Connecticut, U.S.
- Home town: Simsbury, Connecticut, U.S.
- Height: 5 ft 6 in (1.68 m)

Figure skating career
- Country: United States
- Discipline: Men's singles
- Coach: Vladimir Petrenko; Benoît Richaud
- Skating club: Skating Club of Boston

Medal record
U.S. Championships
Bronze medal – third place	2026 St. Louis	Singles

Maxim Naumov (born August 1, 2001) is an American figure skater. He is the 2026 U.S. national bronze medalist, three-time U.S. national pewter medalist, and the 2020 U.S. junior national champion. Naumov finished within the top five at the 2020 World Junior Championships.

He represented the United States at the 2026 Winter Olympics.

== Personal life ==
"Once again, Maxim made us all proud, getting on to the podium at Nationals after 7th place in the short. This beautiful and emotional performance is a result of a team work. Huge thanks to Serhii and Irina Vaypan and of course to Adam Blake for his wonderful choreography of a classic! Maxim has earned his place in the team of 4 Continents. 👏🏻👍🏻💪🏻😄🎊"

— Vadim Naumov and Evgenia Shishkova's final Instagram post caption

Maxim Naumov was born on August 1, 2001, in Hartford, Connecticut. His parents, Vadim Naumov and Evgenia Shishkova, were the 1994 World Champions in pairs for Russia. Naumov previously competed in gymnastics as a child. After graduating from Simsbury High School in 2019, he began attending ASU Online.

Naumov has cited his figure skating influences as being Olympic champions Evgeni Plushenko and Yuzuru Hanyu, as well as his parents.

On January 29, 2025, Naumov's parents, who were passengers onboard American Eagle Flight 5342, were killed in the Potomac River mid-air collision. Three days prior to the crash, the couple expressed pride over their son's fourth-place finish at the 2025 U.S. Championships, which had recently taken place, via their joint Instagram account. Naumov subsequently took control of the Skating Club of Boston's Youth Academy Program that his parents founded.

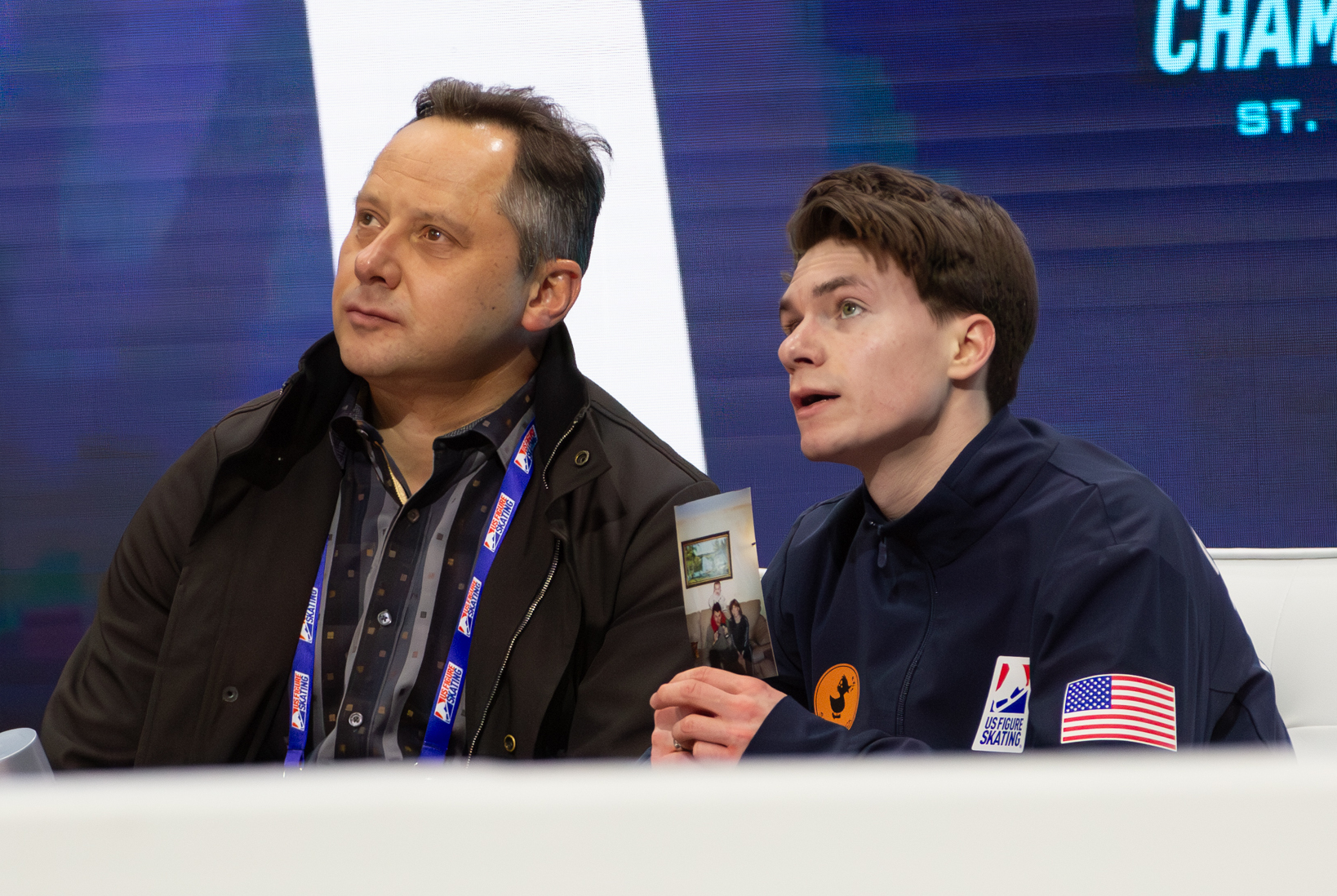
Naumov with coach, Vladimir Petrenko, holding a photo of his late parents in the kiss and cry area at the 2026 U.S. Championships

Two months following the crash, Naumov spoke out about his parents' death and legacy during an interview with Today. He shared, "I would not be the person I am today without them. [... ]They were always like superheroes to me."

== Career ==
=== Early years ===
Naumov began skating at age five after being inspired by his parents. He is the 2013 U.S. national juvenile and the 2017 U.S. national novice champion, as well as the 2016 U.S. national novice and 2018 U.S. national junior bronze medalist. At the advanced novice level, Naumov is also the 2016 Gardena Trophy and 2017 International Challenge Cup champion.

Naumov made his junior international debut at the 2017 Philadelphia Summer International, winning the silver medal behind Ryan Dunk. He made his Junior Grand Prix debut at 2017 JGP Latvia, where he finished eighth. Naumov did not compete during the 2018–19 season due to injury.

=== 2019–20 season: Junior national title ===
Naumov returned to competition in June 2019 after missing the previous season due to injury. Competing on the 2019–20 ISU Junior Grand Prix, he placed seventh at 2019 JGP France.

Naumov won the junior title at the 2020 U.S. Championships. He landed two triple axels in his free skate and achieved a Level 4 on three elements. After attending the U.S. junior camp, he was named to the U.S. team for the 2020 World Junior Championships, alongside Ilia Malinin and Andrew Torgashev. At the 2020 World Junior Championships, he placed tenth in the short and fourth in the free to finish fifth overall.

=== 2020–21 season: Senior debut ===
With the COVID-19 pandemic raging, Naumov was assigned to make his senior Grand Prix debut at the 2020 Skate America, an event scheduled for skaters training in the United States and held in Las Vegas. He placed eighth at the event.

Naumov next competed at the 2021 U.S. Championships, also held in Las Vegas, where he placed fifth in both segments and overall.

=== 2021–22 season ===
Naumov won the bronze medal at the Skating Club of Boston's Cranberry Cup event, and then came sixth at the 2021 U.S. Classic.

=== 2022–23 season ===
Naumov appeared twice on the Challenger circuit in the fall, finishing fifth at both the 2022 CS Budapest Trophy and the 2022 CS Warsaw Cup. Sixth after the short program at the 2023 U.S. Championships, he rose to fourth in the free skate and won the pewter medal. This in turn earned him an assignment to the 2023 Four Continents Championships. He finished tenth at Four Continents.

=== 2023–24 season ===
Beginning the season at the 2023 CS Nepela Memorial, Naumov placed eleventh. On the Grand Prix, he was tenth at the 2023 Skate America.

In advance of the 2024 U.S. Championships, Naumov was preemptively named as first alternate for the American team for the 2024 Four Continents Championships, which were to occur in Shanghai the week after the national championships. Naumov finished second in the short program at the national championships, in what was considered a surprise result. He fell to fourth place after coming fourth in the free skate, winning a second consecutive national pewter medal. He subsequently replaced Camden Pulkinen on the Four Continents team, and finished twelfth the following weekend.

=== 2024–25 season ===
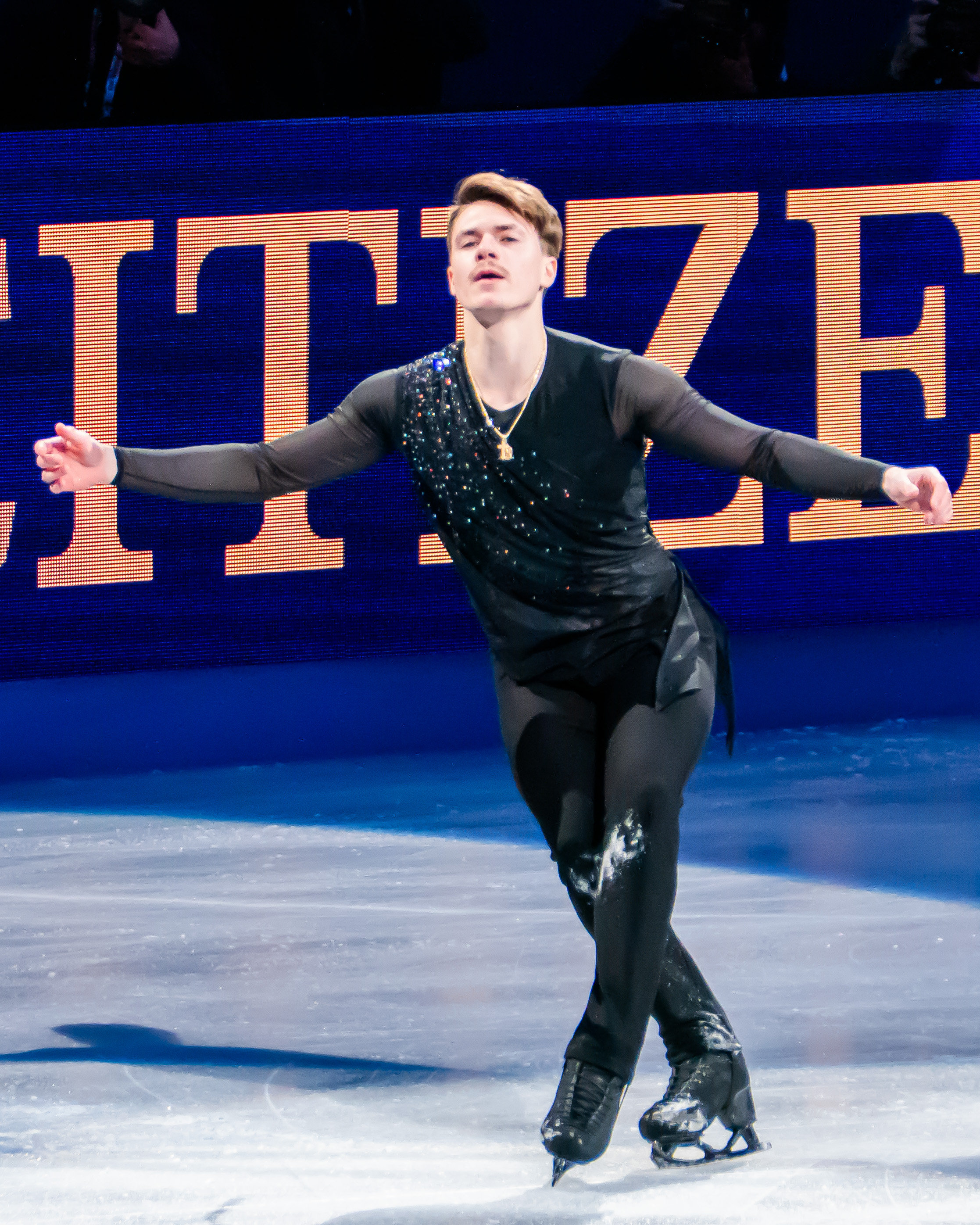
Naumov during the gala at the 2025 World Championships

Naumov started the season at the 2024 CS Nebelhorn Trophy, where he finished in eleventh place. Going on to compete on the 2024–25 Grand Prix circuit at 2024 Skate America, he was seventh of twelve men. Naumov assessed his performance as "technically similar" to his appearance at the Nebelhorn Trophy, explaining that his quadruple jumps were improved in practices "so the consistency is getting there but I'm still lacking a lot of confidence on the actual program run. It's a natural progression so I'm feeling it will get better and better." He was later given a second assignment on the Challenger circuit, placing eighth at the 2024 CS Warsaw Cup.

At the 2025 U.S. Championships in Wichita, Naumov won his third consecutive pewter medal. His only notable error came in the free skate when failing to execute his planned quadruple Salchow jump, which he said he was "definitely bummed about," but added "I'm overall happy with how I did everything." Three days following the conclusion of the championships, Naumov's parents remained in Wichita to participate in a development camp for young skaters. They were part of a group of camp participants who were traveling home on American Eagle Flight 5342, which collided mid-air with a US Army Black Hawk over the Potomac River and crashed, resulting in the deaths of all onboard. Although assigned to the American team for the 2025 Four Continents Championships, Naumov subsequently withdrew.

On March 2, 2025, Naumov took part in Legacy on Ice, an ice show organized by U.S. Figure Skating that paid tribute to the victims aboard American Eagle Flight 5342. He honored his parents' memory by performing to "Город, которого нет (The City That Doesn't Exist)" by Igor Kornelyuk, which was their favorite song. Naumov received a standing ovation following his performance. Later that month, Naumov was invited to perform in the exhibition at the 2025 World Championships that took place in Boston, Massachusetts, United States. He received a long standing ovation from the audience at the end of his performance.

=== 2025–26 season: Milano Cortina Olympics ===
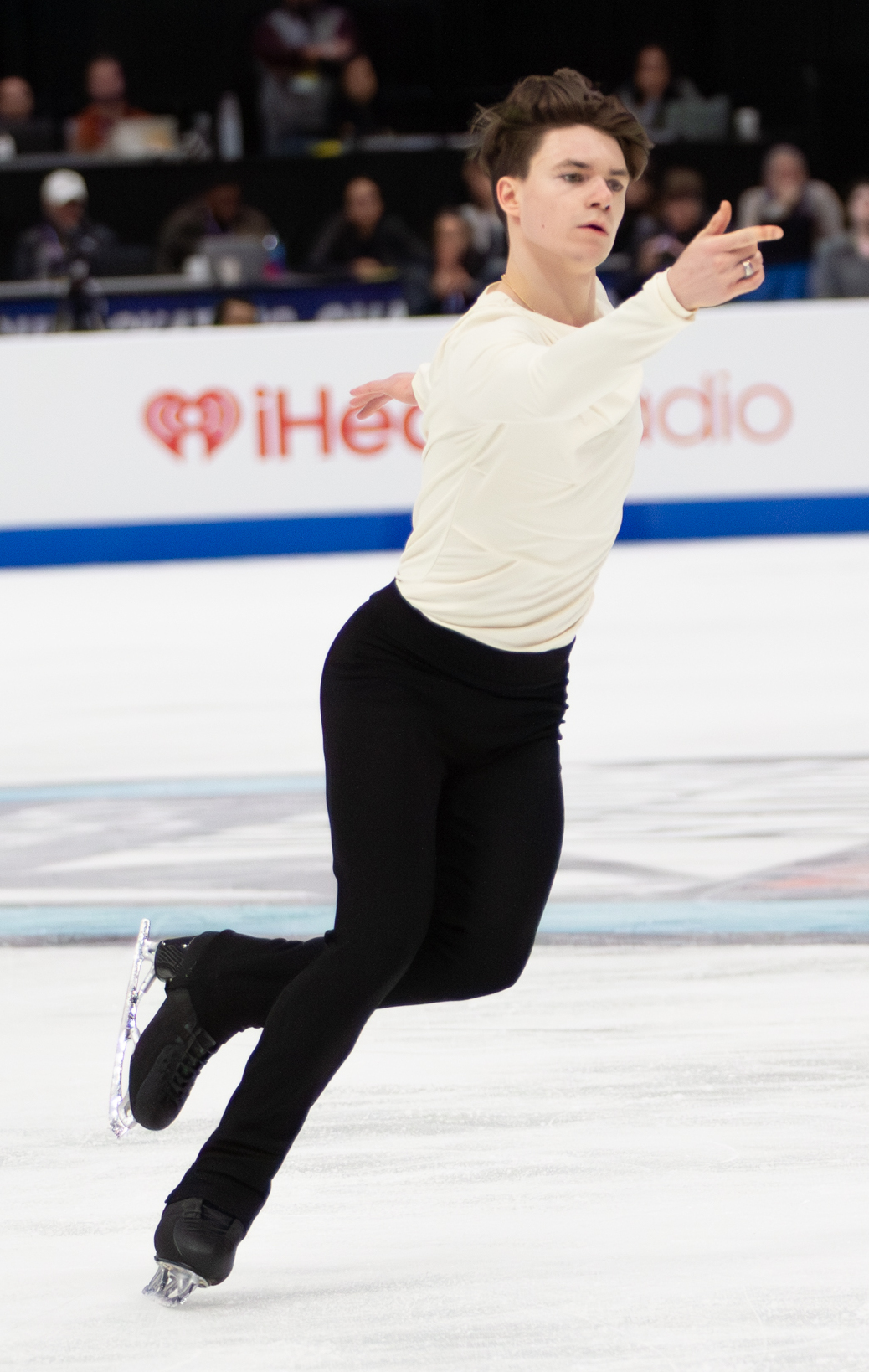
Naumov during his short program at the 2026 U.S. Championships

Following a period of uncertainty, Naumov announced his plans to continue his competitive figure skating career. He selected Vladimir Petrenko, a longtime family friend, as his new head coach. In addition, he added renowned French choreographer Benoît Richaud to his team after being invited to partake in Richaud’s Peak Ice summer training camps in Italy and France.

He opened his season in September by finishing ninth at the 2025 CS Lombardia Trophy. The following month, he went on to place ninth at the 2025 Grand Prix de France and won the gold medal at the 2025 Ice Challenge.

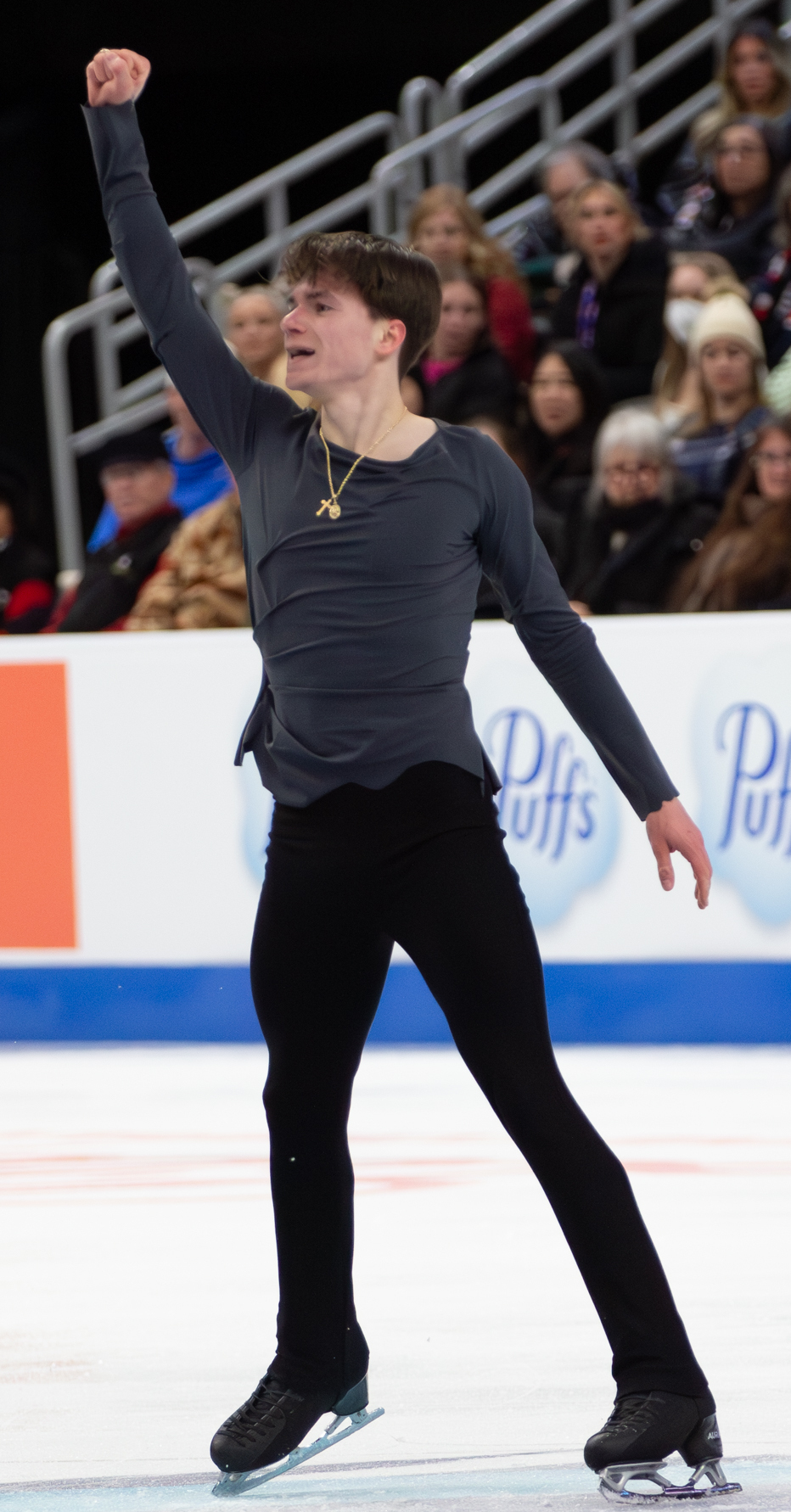
Naumov following his free skate 2026 U.S. Championships

In January, Naumov won the bronze medal at the 2026 U.S. Figure Skating Championships. "It's been an emotional roller coaster for me personally," shared Naumov. "You know, I'm really happy that is all over right now. And I'm relieved but incredibly grateful to be sitting in this position right now." He was subsequently named to the 2026 Winter Olympic team. "I would not be sitting here without the unimaginable work, effort and love from my parents," he said following the announcement. "It means absolutely everything to me, fulfilling the dream that we collectively had as a family since I first was on the ice at five years old. So it means absolutely everything. And I know they’re looking down, smiling and proud."

At the 2026 Winter Olympics, Naumov placed thirteenth in the short program and twenty-second in the free skate, finishing in twentieth place overall. He reflected happily on his Olympic experience following his free skate performance, saying, "What it took for me to get to this moment is what I look back on and what I'm most proud of. Of course, I made mistakes and fell on the [quad] Salchow, but that's not what it's all about. It's about just what it took to get here and the fact that I'm here. I gave everything that I possibly could have to do that program, from the start to finish. That is something I can take away from this... Today, I was able to just take a second, stay on my feet a little bit, and look around, and it was covered with U.S.A. flags. And it just makes me so proud, honestly, to be able to represent my country at the biggest stage. The privilege of doing that is really something. I always need to do things that I'm proud of. Of course, there's a couple of things I would have changed, but hopefully that can inspire me, with everything that I was able to do. And I think I'm going to have a better year later."

== Programs ==
Season	Short program	Free skating	Exhibition
2025–26	Nocturne No. 20 by Frédéric Chopin choreo. by Benoît Richaud	In This Shirt by The Irrepressibles choreo. by Benoît Richaud	That's on Me by Mac Miller choreo. by Adam Blake
2024–25	Steppin' Out with My Baby by Tony Bennett choreo. by Adam Blake	Tosca by Giacomo Puccini choreo. by Adam Blake; Adagio for Tron; The Grid (from Tron: Legacy) by Daft Punk; Blow Your Mind by Will Sparks choreo. by Adam Blake	One Last Breath by Creed; That's on Me by Mac Miller choreo. by Adam Blake; Город, которого нет (from Bandit Petersburg) by Igor Kornelyuk; Ants Marching by Dave Matthews Band
2023–24	Glimpse of Us by Joji choreo. by Adam Blake	Tosca by Giacomo Puccini choreo. by Adam Blake	Wherever I May Roam by Metallica
2022–23	Glimpse of Us by Joji choreo. by Adam Blake	Iron; Shadows by Woodkid; Loyal by Odesza choreo. by Adam Blake	Galaxy by War; Controversy by Prince
2020–22	Run by Joji choreo. by Adam Blake	Unstoppable by E.S. Posthumus; Stabat Mater by Woodkid choreo. by Adam Blake	
2019–20	Uprising by Muse choreo. by Adam Blake	Who Wants to Live Forever by Brian May performed by The Tenors choreo. by Evgenia Shishkova, Matthew Gates	
2017–18	Luck Be a Lady by Frank Loesser performed by Frank Sinatra choreo. by Evgenia Shishkova, Matthew Gates	Who Wants to Live Forever by Brian May performed by The Tenors choreo. by Evgenia Shishkova, Matthew Gates	
2016–17	Maybe I Maybe You by Scorpions choreo. by Adam Blake	Spanish Flame by Maxime Rodriguez choreo. by Adam Blake	
2015–16	Feeling Good performed by Michael Bublé choreo. by Adam Blake	300 Violin Orchestra by Jorge Quintero choreo. by Adam Blake	

== Competitive highlights ==
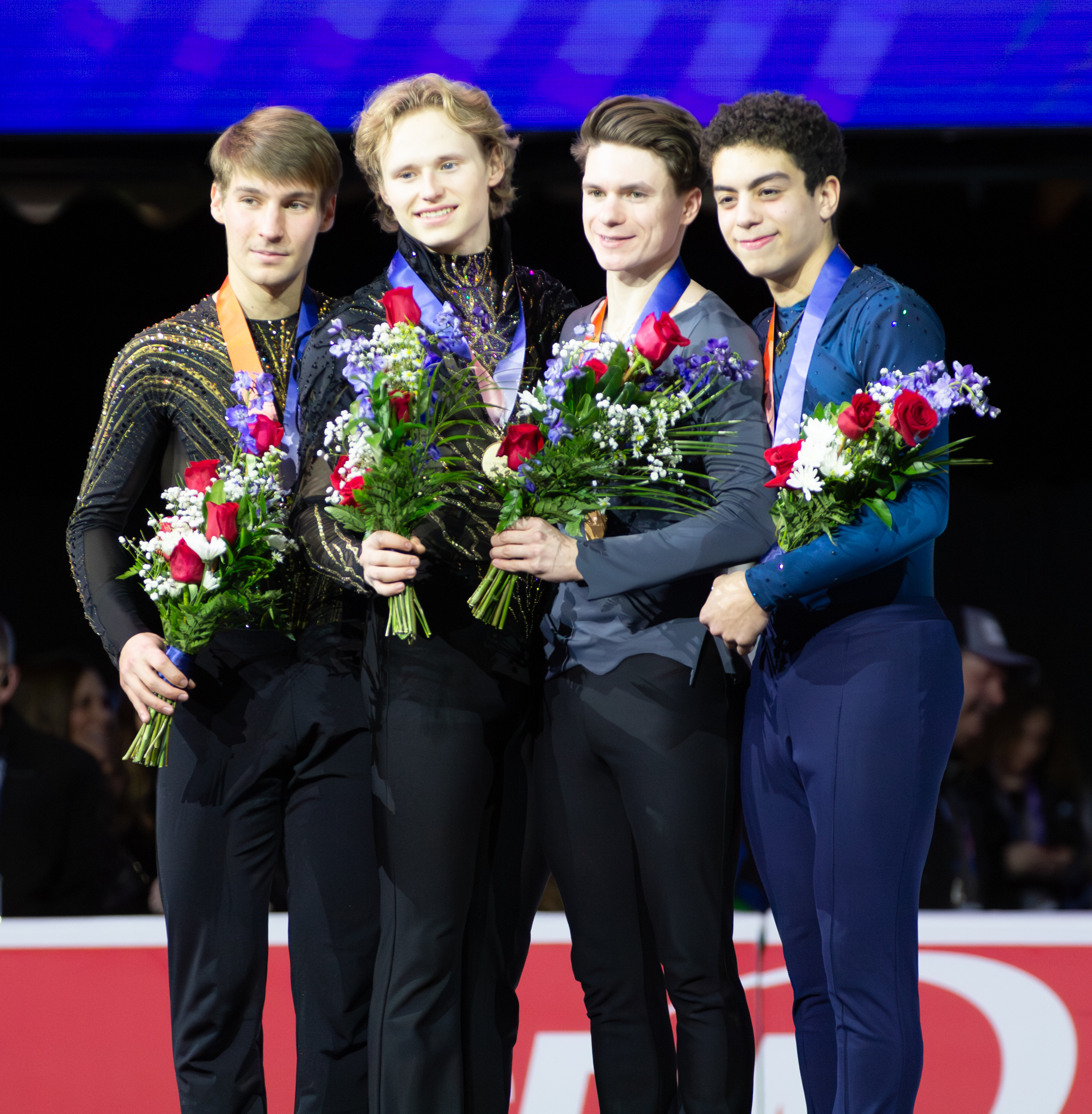
2026 U.S. Figure Skating Championships (from left to right): Andrew Torgashev, Ilia Malinin, Maxim Naumov, Jacob Sanchez

- GP – Event of the ISU Grand Prix Series
- JGP – Event of the ISU Junior Grand Prix Series
- CS – Event of the ISU Challenger Series
- TBD – Assigned
- WD – Withdrew from competition

Competition placements at senior level
Season	2020–21	2021–22	2022–23	2023–24	2024–25	2025–26
Winter Olympics						20th
Four Continents Championships			10th	12th		
U.S. Championships	5th		4th	4th	4th	3rd
GP France						9th
GP Skate America	8th			10th	7th	
CS Budapest Trophy			5th			
CS Lombardia Trophy						9th
CS Nebelhorn Trophy					11th	
CS Nepela Memorial				11th		
CS Tallinn Trophy						4th
CS Warsaw Cup			5th		8th	
Cranberry Cup		3rd				
Ice Challenge						1st
U.S. Classic		6th				

Competition placements at junior level
Season	2017–18	2019–20
World Junior Championships		5th
U.S. Championships	3rd	1st
JGP France		7th
JGP Latvia	8th	
Philadelphia Summer	2nd	

== Detailed results ==
ISU personal best scores in the +5/-5 GOE System
Segment	Type	Score	Event
Total	TSS	227.17	2022 CS Budapest Trophy
Short program	TSS	87.11	2022 CS Budapest Trophy
Short program	TES	47.77	2026 Winter Olympics
Short program	PCS	40.10	2022 CS Budapest Trophy
Free skating	TSS	151.47	2025 Grand Prix de France
Free skating	TES	75.98	2020 World Junior Championships
Free skating	PCS	80.52	2022 CS Budapest Trophy

ISU personal best scores in the +3/-3 GOE System
Segment	Type	Score	Event
Total	TSS	163.66	2017 Junior Grand Prix Riga Cup
Short program	TSS	57.64	2017 Junior Grand Prix Riga Cup
Short program	TES	28.96	2017 Junior Grand Prix Riga Cup
Short program	PCS	29.68	2017 Junior Grand Prix Riga Cup
Free skating	TSS	106.02	2017 Junior Grand Prix Riga Cup
Free skating	TES	51.66	2017 Junior Grand Prix Riga Cup
Free skating	PCS	57.36	2017 Junior Grand Prix Riga Cup

- At national events in the United States, pewter medals are awarded for fourth place.

=== Senior level ===
Results in the 2020–21 season
Date	Event	SP		FS		Total	
Date	Event	P	Score	P	Score	P	Score
Oct 23–24, 2020	(United States) 2020 Skate America	8	70.91	4	143.56	8	214.27
Jan 11–21, 2021	(United States) 2021 U.S. Championships	5	83.53	5	160.67	5	244.20

Results in the 2021–22 season
Date	Event	SP		FS		Total	
Date	Event	P	Score	P	Score	P	Score
Aug 11–15, 2021	(United States) 2021 Cranberry Cup International	6	73.64	3	149.51	3	223.15
Sep 14–17, 2021	(United States) 2021 U.S. International Classic	5	69.99	4	137.40	6	207.39

Results in the 2022–23 season
Date	Event	SP		FS		Total	
Date	Event	P	Score	P	Score	P	Score
Oct 14–16, 2022	(Hungary) 2022 CS Budapest Trophy	1	87.11	5	140.06	5	227.17
Nov 17–20, 2022	(Poland) 2022 CS Warsaw Cup	5	76.17	5	142.81	5	218.98
Jan 23–29, 2023	(United States) 2023 U.S. Championships	6	77.71	4	171.43	4	249.14
Feb 7–12, 2023	(United States) 2023 Four Continents Championships	8	75.96	9	142.75	10	218.71

Results in the 2023–24 season
Date	Event	SP		FS		Total	
Date	Event	P	Score	P	Score	P	Score
Sep 28–30, 2023	(Slovakia) 2023 CS Nepela Memorial	11	70.05	12	131.66	11	201.71
Oct 20–22, 2023	(United States) 2023 Skate America	10	70.73	9	139.80	10	210.53
Jan 22–28, 2024	(United States) 2024 U.S. Championships	2	89.72	4	170.78	4	260.50
Jan 30 – Feb 4, 2024	(China) 2024 Four Continents Championships	15	67.61	9	147.39	12	215.00

Results in the 2024–25 season
Date	Event	SP		FS		Total	
Date	Event	P	Score	P	Score	P	Score
Sep 18–21, 2024	(Germany) 2024 CS Nebelhorn Trophy	15	63.01	11	136.29	11	199.30
Oct 18–20, 2024	(United States) 2024 Skate America	8	73.11	7	143.27	7	216.38
Nov 20–24, 2024	(Poland) 2024 CS Warsaw Cup	5	75.77	12	117.92	8	193.69
Jan 20–26, 2025	(United States) 2025 U.S. Championships	7	82.41	3	165.75	4	248.16

Results in the 2025–26 season
Date	Event	SP		FS		Total	
Date	Event	P	Score	P	Score	P	Score
Sep 11–14, 2025	(Italy) 2025 CS Lombardia Trophy	9	76.71	9	146.72	9	223.43
Oct 17–19, 2025	2025 Grand Prix de France	9	75.27	8	151.47	9	226.74
Nov 5–9, 2025	(Austria) 2025 Ice Challenge	1	92.81	1	153.89	1	246.70
Nov 25–30, 2025	(Estonia) 2025 CS Tallinn Trophy	7	74.53	4	148.51	4	223.04
Jan 4–11, 2026	(United States) 2026 U.S. Championships	4	85.72	4	163.44	3	249.16
Feb 6–19, 2026	(Italy) 2026 Winter Olympics	14	85.65	22	137.71	20	223.46

=== Junior level ===
Results in the 2017–18 season
Date	Event	SP		FS		Total	
Date	Event	P	Score	P	Score	P	Score
Aug 3–5, 2017	(United States) 2017 Philadelphia Summer International	2	60.40	2	114.69	2	175.09
Sep 6–9, 2017	2017 JGP Latvia	9	57.64	9	106.02	8	163.66
Dec 29, 2017 – Jan 8, 2018	(United States) 2018 U.S. Championships	3	64.07	4	114.93	3	179.00

Results in the 2019–20 season
Date	Event	SP		FS		Total	
Date	Event	P	Score	P	Score	P	Score
Aug 21–24, 2019	2019 JGP France	6	63.47	8	115.68	7	179.15
Jan 20–26, 2020	(United States) 2020 U.S. Championships	1	70.75	2	136.17	1	206.92
Mar 2–8, 2020	(Estonia) 2020 World Junior Championships	10	75.20	4	149.90	5	225.10
