= Tarah Kayne =

American pair skater (born 1993)

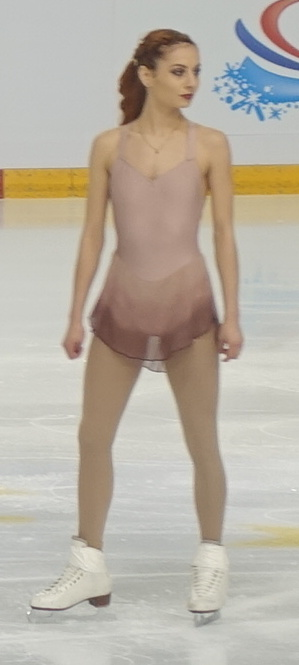

Personal information
- Born: April 28, 1993 (age 33) Fort Myers, Florida, U.S.
- Home town: Colorado Springs, Colorado, U.S.
- Height: 5 ft 2 in (1.57 m)

Figure skating career
- Country: United States
- Discipline: Pair skating
- Partner: Daniel O'Shea (2012–21)
- Began skating: 1998
- Retired: 2020

Medal record
Four Continents Championships
Gold medal – first place	2018 Taipei	Pairs
Silver medal – second place	2014 Taipei	Pairs
U.S. Championships
Gold medal – first place	2016 Saint Paul	Pairs
Silver medal – second place	2018 San Jose	Pairs
Bronze medal – third place	2015 Greensboro	Pairs
Bronze medal – third place	2020 Greensboro	Pairs

Tarah Kayne (born April 28, 1993) is an American retired competitive pair skater. With former partner Daniel O'Shea, she is the 2018 Four Continents champion, 2014 Four Continents silver medalist, and 2016 U.S. national champion.

== Personal life ==
Kayne was born on April 28, 1993, in Fort Myers, Florida.

== Career ==
=== Early years ===
Kayne began learning to skate in 1998. She competed in the novice ladies' category in the 2010–2011 season and then on the junior level for one season. She then switched to pairs, teaming up with Daniel O'Shea in April 2012.

=== 2012–13 season ===
Kayne/O'Shea finished seventh in their first trip to the U.S. Championships, in January 2013. Making their international debut, they won the silver medal at the 2013 International Challenge Cup.

=== 2013–14 season ===
Kayne/O'Shea won bronze medals at the U.S. Classic and Ice Challenge. After placing sixth at the 2014 U.S. Championships, they were assigned to the 2014 Four Continents, where they won the silver medal.

=== 2014–15 season ===
On July 28, 2014, Kayne underwent surgery due to a labral tear in her right hip. As a result, the pair withdrew from their 2014–15 Grand Prix assignments, the 2014 Cup of China and 2014 Rostelecom Cup. Kayne/O'Shea returned to competition at the 2014 Golden Spin of Zagreb, taking bronze at the ISU Challenger Series (CS) event. The pair stepped onto their first national podium at the 2015 U.S. Championships, where they were awarded the bronze medal.

=== 2015–16 season ===
Kayne/O'Shea began their season with gold at a CS event, the 2015 U.S. International Classic. Kayne injured her right knee at the event.

Making their Grand Prix debut, the pair placed sixth at the 2015 Skate America and fourth at the 2015 Rostelecom Cup. Another Challenger medal followed, bronze at the 2015 Golden Spin of Zagreb in December. In January, Kayne/O'Shea placed first in both segments at the 2016 U.S. Championships and won the gold medal by a margin of 14.85 points over defending champions Alexa Scimeca / Chris Knierim.

=== 2016–17 season ===
After placing fifth at the 2016 CS Finlandia Trophy, Kayne/O'Shea competed at two Grand Prix events, finishing sixth at the 2016 Skate America and fourth at the 2016 NHK Trophy. The pair withdrew from the 2017 U.S. Championships due to a concussion, Kayne having hit her head while attempting a throw triple flip during the short program on January 19.

During the season, Kayne experienced increasing pain due to right knee tendinitis, the result of her 2015 injury. She received a new cadaver tendon in an operation at the Vail Valley Medical Center on February 14, 2017, and then refrained from walking for seven weeks. She resumed training by July 2017.

=== 2017–18 season ===
Kayne/O'Shea did not compete in the early part of the season, including the Grand Prix, instead beginning the season at the 2017 CS Golden Spin of Zagreb, where they won the bronze medal. They took silver at the 2018 U.S. Championships, and were named first alternates for the 2018 Winter Olympics, where the United States had only one pairs spot, as well as part of America's teams for the Four Continents and World Championships.

At the 2018 Four Continents Championships, they were third after the short program and then had a personal best score in the free skate to win the gold medal, the first American team to do so in over a decade. Kayne said she felt "really great about our performance," They anticipated competing at the World Championships. However, following the event, Kayne was diagnosed with a stress fracture in her right knee. As a result, they withdrew from the World Championships, and were replaced by bronze medalists Deanna Stellato / Nathan Bartholomay.

They were coached by Jim Peterson, in Ellenton, Florida, until the end of the season.

=== 2018–19 season ===
On September 7, 2018, Kayne/O'Shea announced a coaching change, deciding to join Dalilah Sappenfield in Colorado Springs, Colorado. They began the season with the seventh-place finish at the 2018 CS Nebelhorn Trophy. Assigned to two Grand Prix events, they first competed at the 2018 NHK Trophy, finishing fifth. At the 2018 Internationaux de France, Kayne/O'Shea were fourth after the short program, but placed second in the free skate, finishing less than two points ahead of bronze medalists Aleksandra Boikova / Dmitrii Kozlovskii. This was their first Grand Prix medal. Kayne remarked that after a "less than desirable" performance in Japan, "to have come to France and make this much improvement in just two short weeks made us both very happy."

At the 2019 U.S. Championships, Kayne/O'Shea placed first in the short program, just ahead of Ashley Cain / Timothy LeDuc. In the free skate, they made some small opening mistakes on their twist and side-by-side jumps, but then had a major error when they failed to execute their final lift, which caused them to drop to fourth place. O'Shea commented afterward "I didn't do what I was supposed to do." They were nevertheless named to the American team for the Four Continents Championships over bronze medalists Stellato-Dudek/Bartholomay. They finished in sixth place there, with Kayne saying their performance was a personal disappointment.

=== 2019–20 season ===
Kayne/O'Shea began with a fourth-place finish at the 2019 CS U.S. Classic. On the Grand Prix, they were sixth to begin at the 2019 Cup of China. Kayne/O'Shea were sixth as well at the 2019 NHK Trophy.

Competing at the 2020 U.S. Championships, Kayne/O'Shea placed second in the short program, seven points behind the leaders, Knierim/Knierim. Third in the free skate, they won the bronze medal behind the Knierims and Calalang/Johnson. O'Shea called it "an improvement as the program has progressed over the first part of the season. We are taking steps in the right direction." They finished the season with a fifth-place finish at the 2020 Four Continents Championships.

=== 2020–21 season ===
In September, Kayne and O'Shea announced they were leaving coach Dalilah Sappenfield, at the time saying publicly that they were looking forward to exploring new training options and looking forward to staying strong as a team.

They were fourth at the ISP Points Challenge, a virtual domestic competition. They competed at the 2020 Skate America, primarily attended by American pairs teams due to travel restrictions relating to the COVID-19 pandemic. Their previous coaches Jim Peterson and Amanda Evora helped them to prepare for the competition. The permanent training environment of Kayne and O'Shea will be determined after the competition.

On December 10, it was announced that Kayne and O'Shea had split. While Kayne initially said she would be staying with Peterson and Evora as coaches, she subsequently retired from competitive skating.

=== Allegations against Dalilah Sappenfield ===
In an exposé published by USA Today on October 8, 2021, Kayne detailed the alleged emotional and psychological abuse she endured at the hands of her former coach, Dalilah Sappenfield, before leaving Sappenfield's training group in September 2020. Kayne stated that Sappenfield's abuse prompted her to engage in self-harm behaviors, and that she'd been afraid to seek mental health treatment out of concern that Sappenfield would find out. She said, "these awful experiences forced me out of the sport I love. Dalilah said multiple times that she wanted to end my career, and she succeeded." Kayne's former skating partner, Danny O'Shea, expressed his support for Kayne on social media. Kayne was one of several skaters to file complaints against Sappenfield with the United States Center for SafeSport, leading to her suspension pending further investigation.

== Programs ==
=== Pair skating with Daniel O'Shea ===
Season	Short program	Free skating	Exhibition
2020–21	Clair de lune by Claude Debussy choreo. by Randi Strong	Carmen by Georges Bizet choreo. by Randi Strong	
2019–20	Sweet Dreams (Are Made of This) (from A Wrinkle in Time) by Eurythmics performed by Mark Hadley & Dresage choreo. by Charlie White	Les Misérables by Claude-Michel Schönberg, Alain Boublil & Herbert Kretzmer choreo. by Pasquale Camerlengo	
2018–19	That's It (I'm Crazy) by Sofi Tukker choreo. by Shae-Lynn Bourne, Shae Zukiwsky; Turning Page by Sleeping at Last	Swan Lake by Pyotr Ilyich Tchaikovsky choreo. by Shae-Lynn Bourne, Shae Zukiwsky	That's It (I'm Crazy) by Sofi Tukker choreo. by Shae-Lynn Bourne, Shae Zukiwsky
2017–18	All I Ask of You (from The Phantom of the Opera) by Andrew Lloyd Webber choreo. by Massimo Scali	Swan Lake by Pyotr Ilyich Tchaikovsky choreo. by Shae-Lynn Bourne, Shae Zukiwsky	Evermore by Josh Groban
2016–17	Take Me to Church by Hozier choreo. by Jim Peterson; Will You Still Love Me Tomorrow; Back to Black by Amy Winehouse choreo. by Judy Blumberg	A Song of India by Nikolai Rimsky-Korsakov; Marche Slave by Pyotr Ilyich Tchaikovsky choreo. by Jim Peterson, Judy Blumberg	Johanna (from Sweeney Todd)
2015–16	Take Me to Church by Hozier choreo. by Jim Peterson; España cañí by Pascual Marquina	The Music of the Night by Andrew Lloyd Webber and Charles Hart performed by Barbra Streisand and Michael Crawford choreo. by Jim Peterson	Manhattan by Sara Bareilles
2014–15	Your Song by Ewan McGregor choreo. by Jim Peterson	Spartacus by Aram Khachaturian choreo. by Jim Peterson	Saturday Night's Alright for Fighting by Elton John
2013–14	James Bond medley by John Barry choreo. by Jim Peterson	Don Quixote by Ludwig Minkus choreo. by Jim Peterson	
2012–13	My Fair Lady by Frederick Loewe choreo. by Jim Peterson	The Nutcracker by Pyotr Ilyich Tchaikovsky choreo. by Jim Peterson	

== Competitive highlights ==
- GP – Event of the ISU Grand Prix Series
- JGP – Event of the ISU Junior Grand Prix Series
- CS – Event of the ISU Challenger Series
- WD – Withdrew from competition

=== Pair skating with Daniel O'Shea ===
Competition placements at senior level
Season	2012–13	2013–14	2014–15	2015–16	2016–17	2017–18	2018–19	2019–20	2020–21
World Championships				13th					
Four Continents Championships		2nd	8th	4th		1st	6th	5th	
U.S. Championships	7th	6th	3rd	1st	WD	2nd	4th	3rd	
GP Cup of China								6th	
GP France							2nd		
GP NHK Trophy					4th		5th	6th	
GP Rostelecom Cup				4th					
GP Skate America				6th	6th				5th
CS Finlandia Trophy					5th		7th		
CS Golden Spin of Zagreb			3rd	3rd		3rd		2nd	
CS Tallinn Trophy							2nd		
CS U.S. Classic		3rd		1st				4th	
Challenge Cup	2nd								
Ice Challenge		3rd							

== Detailed results ==
=== Pair skating with Daniel O'Shea ===
ISU personal best scores in the +5/-5 GOE System
Segment	Type	Score	Event
Total	TSS	194.29	2019 CS Golden Spin of Zagreb
Short program	TSS	66.34	2019 Four Continents Championships
Short program	TES	36.96	2019 CS Golden Spin of Zagreb
Short program	PCS	30.66	2020 Four Continents Championships
Free skating	TSS	128.09	2019 CS Golden Spin of Zagreb
Free skating	TES	66.13	2018 Internationaux de France
Free skating	PCS	62.24	2019 CS Golden Spin of Zagreb

ISU personal best scores in the +3/-3 GOE System
Segment	Type	Score	Event
Total	TSS	194.42	2018 Four Continents Championships
Short program	TSS	65.74	2018 Four Continents Championships
Short program	TES	35.80	2014 Four Continents Championships
Short program	PCS	30.03	2018 Four Continents Championships
Free skating	TSS	128.68	2018 Four Continents Championships
Free skating	TES	65.73	2018 Four Continents Championships
Free skating	PCS	62.95	2018 Four Continents Championships

- Small medals for the short program and free skating are only awarded at ISU Championships.
- At national events in the United States, pewter medals are awarded for fourth place.

Results in the 2012–13 season
Date	Event	SP		FS		Total	
Date	Event	P	Score	P	Score	P	Score
Jan 20–27, 2013	(United States) 2013 U.S. Championships	9	47.74	7	100.58	7	148.32
Feb 21–24, 2013	(Netherlands) 2013 International Challenge Cup	3	54.11	2	113.71	2	167.82

Results in the 2013–14 season
Date	Event	SP		FS		Total	
Date	Event	P	Score	P	Score	P	Score
Sep 12–14, 2013	(United States) 2013 U.S. International Classic	4	60.31	3	106.96	3	167.27
Nov 19–24, 2013	(Austria) 2013 Ice Challenge	3	53.97	2	103.68	3	157.65
Jan 5–12, 2014	(United States) 2014 U.S. Championships	7	61.48	6	112.41	6	173.89
Jan 20–25, 2014	(Taiwan) 2014 Four Continents Championships	3	62.05	2	119.40	2	181.45

Results in the 2014–15 season
Date	Event	SP		FS		Total	
Date	Event	P	Score	P	Score	P	Score
Dec 4–6, 2014	(Croatia) 2014 CS Golden Spin of Zagreb	3	50.72	3	111.00	3	161.72
Jan 17–25, 2015	(United States) 2015 U.S. Championships	4	61.56	3	123.75	3	185.31
Feb 10–15, 2015	(South Korea) 2015 Four Continents Championships	8	57.91	8	108.76	8	166.67

Results in the 2015–16 season
Date	Event	SP		FS		Total	
Date	Event	P	Score	P	Score	P	Score
Sep 16–20, 2015	(United States) 2015 CS U.S. International Classic	3	54.30	1	116.00	1	170.30
Oct 22–25, 2015	(United States) 2015 Skate America	6	58.38	5	107.61	6	165.99
Nov 20–22, 2015	(Russia) 2015 Rostelecom Cup	6	58.78	4	122.45	4	181.23
Dec 2–5, 2015	(Croatia) 2015 CS Golden Spin of Zagreb	6	55.58	1	119.38	3	174.96
Jan 15–24, 2016	(United States) 2016 U.S. Championships	1	69.61	1	142.04	1	211.65
Feb 16–21, 2016	(Taiwan) 2016 Four Continents Championships	7	59.72	4	122.30	4	182.02
Mar 28 – Apr 3, 2016	(United States) 2016 World Championships	14	59.27	11	118.96	13	178.23

Results in the 2016–17 season
Date	Event	SP		FS		Total	
Date	Event	P	Score	P	Score	P	Score
Oct 6–10, 2016	(Finland) 2016 CS Finlandia Trophy	4	54.65	5	103.46	5	158.11
Oct 21–23, 2016	(United States) 2016 Skate America	8	57.93	3	115.57	6	173.50
Nov 25–27, 2016	(Japan) 2016 NHK Trophy	5	57.02	4	115.18	4	172.20
Jan 14–22, 2017	(United States) 2017 U.S. Championships	5	61.80	—N/a	—N/a	–	WD

Results in the 2017–18 season
Date	Event	SP		FS		Total	
Date	Event	P	Score	P	Score	P	Score
Dec 6–9, 2017	(Croatia) 2017 CS Golden Spin of Zagreb	3	56.38	3	105.88	3	162.26
Jan 3–7, 2018	(United States) 2018 U.S. Championships	2	68.93	2	131.87	2	200.80
Jan 22–28, 2018	(Taiwan) 2018 Four Continents Championships	3	65.74	1	128.68	1	194.42

Results in the 2018–19 season
Date	Event	SP		FS		Total	
Date	Event	P	Score	P	Score	P	Score
Oct 4–7, 2018	(Finland) 2018 CS Finlandia Trophy	7	52.53	6	109.50	7	162.03
Nov 9–11, 2018	(Japan) 2018 NHK Trophy	5	59.00	5	105.16	5	164.16
Nov 23–25, 2018	2018 Internationaux de France	4	63.45	2	127.98	2	191.43
Nov 26 – Dec 2, 2018	(Estonia) 2018 CS Tallinn Trophy	4	57.28	1	120.41	2	177.69
Jan 19–27, 2019	(United States) 2019 U.S. Championships	1	71.83	4	126.81	4	198.64
Feb 7–10, 2019	(United States) 2019 Four Continents Championships	5	66.34	6	114.02	6	180.36

Results in the 2019–20 season
Date	Event	SP		FS		Total	
Date	Event	P	Score	P	Score	P	Score
Sep 17–22, 2019	(United States) 2019 CS U.S. International Classic	4	64.90	4	109.12	4	174.02
Nov 8–10, 2019	2019 Cup of China	5	64.08	6	114.71	6	178.79
Nov 22–24, 2019	(Japan) 2019 NHK Trophy	7	58.70	5	120.03	6	178.73
Dec 4–7, 2019	(Croatia) 2019 CS Golden Spin of Zagreb	3	66.20	2	128.09	2	194.29
Jan 20–26, 2020	(United States) 2020 U.S. Championships	2	70.35	3	133.72	3	204.07
Feb 4–9, 2020	(South Korea) 2020 Four Continents Championships	7	62.65	5	123.55	5	186.20

Results in the 2020–21 season
Date	Event	SP		FS		Total	
Date	Event	P	Score	P	Score	P	Score
Oct 23–24, 2020	(United States) 2020 Skate America	5	59.86	5	114.49	5	174.35
