= Eric Sjoberg =

American figure skater

Personal information
- Born: August 22, 2001 (age 25) Middletown, Maryland, U.S.
- Home town: Los Angeles, California, U.S.
- Height: 5 ft 10 in (1.78 m)

Figure skating career
- Country: United States
- Coach: Rafael Arutunian, Vera Arutunian, Nadezda Kanaeva
- Skating club: Los Angeles FSC
- Began skating: 2006

Eric Sjoberg (born August 22, 2001) is an American figure skater. He is the 2021 U.S. International Figure Skating Classic bronze medalist and 2020 U.S. national junior silver medalist.

== Personal life ==
Sjoberg Graduated from the Capistrano Connections Academy in 2019.

== Career ==
=== Early career ===
Sjoberg began skating in 2006.

=== 2019–2020 season ===
Competing on the 2019–20 ISU Junior Grand Prix, he placed fourteenth at 2019 JGP Russia. In January, he won the junior silver medal at the 2020 U.S. Championships. He skated a clean free skate with achieved a Level 4 on three elements. He was also assigned to the 2020 Bavarian Open, where he placed fourth.

=== 2020–2021 season ===
Sjoberg competed in the virtual Championship Series, placing first in his group and first overall. This qualified him for his first Senior national championships. Competing at the 2021 U.S. Championships, Sjoberg placed ninth.

=== 2021-2022 season ===
Sjoberg started the 2021–2022 season by placing 3rd in the 2021 U.S. International Figure Skating Classic.

== Programs ==
Season	Short program	Free skating
2020–2021	The Blower's Daughter by Damien Rice	Symphony No. 5 in E Minor; Adante by Pyotr Ilyich Tchaikovsky
2019–2020	Take Five; Unsquare Dance by Dave Brubeck	Winter in Buenos Aires by Astor Piazzolla

== Competitive highlights ==
GP: Grand Prix; CS: Challenger Series; JGP: Junior Grand Prix

=== 2016–17 to present ===
International
Event	16–17	17–18	18–19	19–20	20–21	21–22	22–23	23–24
CS Golden Spin						12th		
CS U.S. Classic (Note: The 2021 U.S. Classic was not part of the Challenger Series that season.)							9th	
CS Warsaw Cup						19th		
Cranberry Cup							3rd	
U.S. Classic						3rd		
International: Junior
JGP Australia		8th						
JGP Australia		8th						
JGP Russia	7th			14th				
Bavarian Open				4th				
National
U.S. Championships	4th J		10th J	2nd J	9th	WD		
U.S. Collegiate Champ.								2nd
J = Junior level; TBD = Assigned

=== 2010–2011 to 2015–2016 ===
International: Junior
Event	15–16
Egna Trophy	3rd

== Detailed results ==
=== Senior level ===
Small medals for short and free programs awarded only at ISU Championships. Pewter medals (fourth place) awarded only at U.S. domestic events. Current ISU world bests highlighted in bold and italic. Personal bests highlighted in bold.

**2022–2023 season**
Date	Event	SP	FS	Total
September 13–16, 2022	2022 CS U.S. Classic	11; 47.49	8; 131.60	9; 179.09
August 9–14, 2022	2022 Cranberry Cup International	2; 70.46	3; 129.94	3; 200.40
2021–22 season
Date	Event	SP	FS	Total
December 7–11, 2021	2021 CS Golden Spin of Zagreb	10; **73.48**	12; **139.29**	12; **212.77**
November 17–20, 2021	2021 CS Warsaw Cup	24; 60.33	15; 129.05	19; 189.38
September 15–19, 2021	2021 U.S. Classic	3; 78.11	3; 143.01	3; 221.12
**2020–21 season**
Date	Event	SP	FS	Total
January 11–21, 2021	2021 U.S. Championships	11; 74.01	10; 139.38	9; 213.39

=== Junior level ===
Small medals are awarded at ISU championships only. Personal bests highlighted in bold.

**2019–20 season**
Date	Event	SP	FS	Total
February 3–9, 2020	2020 Bavarian Open	3; 68.75	4; 120.56	4; 189.31
January 20–26, 2020	2020 U.S. Championships	6; 62.97	1; 139.41	2; 202.38
11–14 September 2019	2019 JGP Russia	18; 48.57	13; 104.69	14; 153.26
2018–19 season
Date	Event	SP	FS	Total
Jan. 19 – 27, 2019	2019 U.S. Championships	10; 55.54	10; 106.45	10; 161.99
2017–18 season
August 23–26, 2017	2017 JGP Australia	8; 53.69	6; 116.85	8; 170.54
2016–17 season
January 14 – 22, 2017	2017 U.S. Championships	3; 60.73	4; 109.88	4; 170.61
September 14–17, 2016	2016 JGP Russia	6; 59.72	8; 117.49	7; 177.21
2015–16 season
Date	Event	SP	FS	Total
April 15–17, 2016	2016 Gardena Spring Trophy	3; 47.30	3; 104.16	3; 151.46
