= 2016 U.S. Figure Skating Championships =

Figure skating competition

- Type: National championship
- Date: January 15 – 24
- Season: 2015–16
- Location: Saint Paul, Minnesota
- Venue: Xcel Energy Center; Bloomington Ice Garden

Champions
- Men's singles: Adam Rippon
- Ladies' singles: Gracie Gold
- Pairs: Tarah Kayne / Daniel O'Shea
- Ice dance: Maia Shibutani / Alex Shibutani
- Previous: 2015 U.S. Championships
- Next: 2017 U.S. Championships

The 2016 Prudential U.S. Figure Skating Championships were held from January 15–24 in Saint Paul, Minnesota at the Xcel Energy Center and Bloomington Ice Garden. Medals were awarded in the disciplines of men's singles, ladies singles, pair skating, and ice dancing at the senior, junior, novice, intermediate, and juvenile levels. The results were part of the U.S. selection criteria for the 2016 Four Continents, 2016 World Junior Championships, and the 2016 World Championships.

The host was announced in November 2012.

== Qualifying ==
Competitors qualified at regional and sectional competitions held from October to November 2015.

Date	Event	Location	Results
October 3–5, 2015	2016 Central Pacific Regionals	San Jose, California	Results
October 3–5, 2015	2016 North Atlantic Regionals	Lake Placid, New York	Results
October 3–6, 2015	2016 Southwestern Regionals	Independence, Missouri	Results
October 10–12, 2015	2016 Northwest Pacific Regionals	Montlake, Washington	Results
October 10–13, 2015	2016 Southwest Pacific Regionals	Pasadena, California	Results
October 10–13, 2015	2016 Upper Great Lakes Regionals	Pleasant Prairie, Wisconsin	Results
October 17–20, 2015	2016 South Atlantic Regionals	Aston, Pennsylvania	Results
October 17–20, 2015	2016 New England Regionals	Boxborough, Massachusetts	Results
October 17–20, 2015	2016 Eastern Great Lakes Regionals	Fort Wayne, Indiana	Results
November 17–21, 2015	2016 Eastern Sectionals	Simsbury, Connecticut	Results
November 17–21, 2015	2016 Midwestern Sectionals	Strongsville, Ohio	Results
November 17–21, 2015	2016 Pacific Coast Sectionals	Burbank, California	Results
January 16–24, 2016	2016 U.S. Championships	Saint Paul, Minnesota	Results

Following sectional competitions, U.S. Figure Skating published a list of skaters who had qualified or earned a bye. Skaters who subsequently withdrew included Jason Brown, Jordan Moeller, Joshua Farris, Richard Dornbush, and Lydia Erdman / Alexey Shchepetov.

== Medal summary ==
=== Senior ===
Discipline	Gold	Silver	Bronze	Pewter
Men	Adam Rippon	Max Aaron	Nathan Chen	Grant Hochstein
Ladies	Gracie Gold	Polina Edmunds	Ashley Wagner	Mirai Nagasu
Pairs	Tarah Kayne / Daniel O'Shea	Alexa Scimeca / Chris Knierim	Marissa Castelli / Mervin Tran	Madeline Aaron / Max Settlage
Ice dancing	Maia Shibutani / Alex Shibutani	Madison Chock / Evan Bates	Madison Hubbell / Zachary Donohue	Anastasia Cannuscio / Colin McManus

=== Junior ===
Discipline	Gold	Silver	Bronze	Pewter
Men	Tomoki Hiwatashi	Kevin Shum	Alexei Krasnozhon	Paolo Borromeo
Ladies	Emily Chan	Vivian Le	Megan Wessenberg	Rebecca Peng
Pairs	Joy Weinberg / Maximiliano Fernandez	Lindsay Weinstein / Jacob Simon	Merilya Findlay / Austin Hale	Madeleine Gallagher / Justin Highgate-Brutman
Ice dancing	Lorraine McNamara / Quinn Carpenter	Rachel Parsons / Michael Parsons	Elliana Pogrebinsky / Alex Benoit	Christina Carreira / Anthony Ponomarenko

=== Novice ===
Discipline	Gold	Silver	Bronze	Pewter
Men	Eric Sjoberg	Peter Liu	Maxim Naumov	William Hubbart
Ladies	Haley Beavers	Alexia Paganini	Sierra Venetta	Ashley Lin
Pairs	Elli Kopmar / Jonah Barrett	Isabella Gamez / Griffin Schwab	Sapphire Jaeckel / Matthew Scoralle	Emma Coppess / Robert Hennings
Ice dancing	Caroline Green / Gordon Green	Emma Gunter / Caleb Wein	Sophia Elder / Christopher Elder	Gianna Buckley / JT Michel

=== Intermediate ===
Discipline	Gold	Silver	Bronze	Pewter
Men	Joseph Kang	Alex Wellman	Jordan Evans	Lucas Altieri
Ladies	Alysa Liu	Sophia Chouinard	Alyssa Rich	Angelina Huang
Pairs	Jasmine Fendi / Joshua Fendi	Eliana Secunda / Blake Eisenach	Berit Cummings / Jabe Roberts	Isabelle Goldstein / Keyton Berringer
Ice dancing	Elizabeth Tkachenko / Alexei Kiliakov	Avonley Nguyen / Maxwell Gart	Isabella Amoia / Cory Fraiman	Jordan Lin / Morgan Sletten

=== Juvenile ===
Discipline	Gold	Silver	Bronze	Pewter
Men	Ilia Malinin	Samuel Mindra	Maxim Zharkov	Philip Baker
Ladies	Stephanie Ciarochi	Hanna Harrell	Reagan Scott	Jill Heiner
Pairs	Isabelle Martins / Ryan Bedard	Julia Curran / Franz-Peter Jerosch	Cate Fleming / Jedidiah Isbell	Jenna Gordon / Ian Meyh
Ice dancing	Layla Karnes / Jeffrey Chen	Maria Soldatova / Faddey Soldatov	Claire Cain / Andrei Davydov	Shin Lei Case / Maxim Zharkov

== Senior results ==
=== Senior men ===
Rank	Name	Total	SP		FS	
1	Adam Rippon	270.75	3	88.01	1	182.74
2	Max Aaron	269.55	1	91.83	3	177.72
3	Nathan Chen	266.93	4	86.33	2	180.60
4	Grant Hochstein	252.84	6	79.26	4	173.58
5	Ross Miner	248.01	2	90.90	6	157.11
6	Alexander Johnson	241.94	7	73.69	5	168.25
7	Timothy Dolensky	236.13	5	80.01	7	156.12
8	Vincent Zhou	217.23	8	68.10	8	149.13
9	Sean Rabbitt	192.63	9	66.71	10	125.92
10	Daniel Kulenkamp	187.34	13	56.97	9	130.37
11	Scott Dyer	182.10	12	59.67	11	122.43
12	Shotaro Omori	181.49	10	63.82	13	117.67
13	Emmanuel Savary	179.32	11	62.96	15	116.36
14	Sebastien Payannet	172.68	14	56.10	14	116.58
15	Ben Jalovick	167.33	19	48.16	12	119.17
16	Jimmy Ma	161.63	15	51.95	17	109.68
17	Robert Przepioski	160.54	16	49.38	16	111.16
18	Curran Oi	150.06	18	48.66	18	101.40
19	Eric Stinehart	141.50	17	49.11	19	92.39

=== Senior ladies ===
Rank	Name	Total	SP		FS	
1	Gracie Gold	210.46	2	62.50	1	147.96
2	Polina Edmunds	207.51	1	70.19	2	137.32
3	Ashley Wagner	197.88	4	62.41	3	135.47
4	Mirai Nagasu	188.84	5	59.64	4	129.20
5	Tyler Pierce	188.50	3	62.45	5	126.05
6	Bradie Tennell	181.33	7	58.26	6	123.07
7	Hannah Miller	174.42	9	57.86	7	116.56
8	Karen Chen	168.75	12	54.86	8	113.89
9	Courtney Hicks	168.04	11	54.93	9	113.11
10	Angela Wang	163.17	10	55.23	10	107.94
11	Mariah Bell	160.03	6	58.85	11	101.18
12	Franchesca Chiera	140.38	8	57.94	16	82.44
13	Katie McBeath	133.52	14	46.94	13	86.58
14	Ashley Cain	131.89	13	48.35	15	83.54
15	Heidi Munger	131.46	18	41.48	12	89.98
16	Christina Cleveland	121.81	17	41.49	17	80.32
17	Alexie Mieskoski	121.27	16	41.63	18	79.64
18	Maria Yang	120.20	21	36.34	14	83.86
19	Carly Gold	107.96	15	42.41	21	65.55
20	Avery Kurtz	107.29	19	41.27	20	66.02
21	Alexis Gagnon	105.56	22	33.24	19	72.32
22	Elena Pulkinen	101.65	20	38.22	22	63.43

=== Senior pairs ===
Tarah Kayne / Daniel O'Shea won both segments to win their first national title by nearly 15 points, with a total score of 211.65 points. Defending champions Alexa Scimeca / Chris Knierim earned silver with a total of 196.80 points. Marissa Castelli / Mervin Tran placed third in both segments to earn bronze, and Madeline Aaron / Max Settlage maintained their fourth-place standing from the short to earn pewter.

Rank	Name	Total	SP		FS	
1	Tarah Kayne / Daniel O'Shea	211.65	1	69.61	1	142.04
2	Alexa Scimeca / Chris Knierim	196.80	2	67.35	2	129.45
3	Marissa Castelli / Mervin Tran	179.04	3	64.12	3	114.92
4	Madeline Aaron / Max Settlage	157.81	4	57.47	6	100.34
5	Jessica Calalang / Zack Sidhu	156.77	7	50.53	4	106.24
6	Erika Smith / AJ Reiss	152.18	6	51.09	5	101.09
7	Jessica Pfund / Joshua Santillan	133.79	5	54.20	10	79.59
8	Brianna de la Mora / Maxim Kurdyukov	130.09	9	45.04	9	85.05
9	Alexandria Shaughnessy / James Morgan	129.50	10	42.56	7	86.94
10	Cali Fujimoto / Nicholas Barsi-Rhyne	128.39	11	42.05	8	86.34
11	Caitlin Fields / Ernie Utah Stevens	117.39	8	45.67	11	71.72
12	Elizaveta Usmantseva / Matej Silecky	105.30	12	38.34	12	66.96
13	Alyssa McDougal / Paul Schatz	95.04	13	32.14	13	62.90

=== Senior ice dance ===
Maia Shibutani / Alex Shibutani overcame a 0.47 point deficit from the short dance to overtake defending champions Madison Chock / Evan Bates and win their first senior national title.

Rank	Name	Total	SP		FS	
1	Maia Shibutani / Alex Shibutani	190.14	2	74.67	1	115.47
2	Madison Chock / Evan Bates	186.93	1	75.14	2	111.79
3	Madison Hubbell / Zachary Donohue	178.81	3	71.10	3	107.71
4	Anastasia Cannuscio / Colin McManus	160.46	4	63.12	4	97.34
5	Kaitlin Hawayek / Jean-Luc Baker	158.86	5	63.02	5	95.84
6	Danielle Thomas / Daniel Eaton	145.01	6	57.98	7	87.03
7	Karina Manta / Joseph Johnson	142.70	7	54.57	6	88.13
8	Charlotte Maxwell / Ryan Devereaux	128.98	8	51.18	8	77.80
9	Alexandra Aldridge / Matthew Blackmer	121.16	10	46.16	9	75.00
10	Alissandra Aronow / Collin Brubaker	116.41	9	47.24	10	69.17
11	Kseniya Ponomaryova / Oleg Altukhov	99.86	11	39.66	11	60.20
12	Tory Patsis / Nathaniel Fast	91.88	13	35.59	12	56.29
13	Elicia Reynolds / Stephen Reynolds	85.95	12	35.91	13	50.04
14	Gabriela Morrell Zucker / Andrejs Sitiks	72.60	14	30.20	14	42.40

== Junior results ==
=== Junior men ===
Rank	Name	Total	SP		FS	
1	Tomoki Hiwatashi	202.73	1	65.90	1	136.83
2	Kevin Shum	187.95	3	62.28	2	125.67
3	Alexei Krasnozhon	176.21	7	53.96	3	122.25
4	Paolo Borromeo	170.78	4	57.85	5	112.93
5	Oleksiy Melnyk	168.23	9	50.98	4	117.25
6	Tony Lu	164.39	2	62.50	9	101.89
7	Anthony Boucher	164.01	8	51.42	6	112.59
8	Sean Conlon	157.88	5	54.61	7	103.27
9	Justin Ly	156.85	6	54.45	8	102.40
10	Chase Belmontes	148.58	10	50.78	11	97.80
11	Camden Pulkinen	145.39	11	46.80	10	98.59
12	Yamato Rowe	123.78	12	44.46	12	79.32

=== Junior ladies ===
Rank	Name	Total	SP		FS	
1	Emily Chan	180.83	1	66.74	1	114.09
2	Vivian Le	166.36	2	57.02	2	109.34
3	Megan Wessenberg	154.21	5	50.81	3	103.40
4	Rebecca Peng	146.14	6	49.20	4	96.94
5	Alice Yang	141.44	4	51.48	5	89.96
6	Vanna Giang	128.54	8	45.20	8	83.34
7	Akari Nakahara	128.33	9	44.10	7	84.23
8	Shannon Porter	127.35	10	42.96	6	84.39
9	Anna Grace Davidson	123.15	7	46.69	11	74.46
10	Paige Rydberg	121.74	11	41.35	9	80.39
11	Brynne McIsaac	120.46	12	40.10	10	80.36
12	Carly Berrios	113.59	3	53.02	12	60.57

=== Junior pairs ===
Rank	Name	Total	SP		FS	
1	Joy Weinberg / Maximiliano Fernandez	139.24	2	48.80	1	90.44
2	Lindsay Weinstein / Jacob Simon	138.90	1	49.54	2	89.36
3	Meiryla Findley / Austin Hale	129.01	5	44.31	3	84.70
4	Madeleine Gallagher / Justin Highgate-Brutman	120.91	4	45.38	8	75.33
5	Jacquelyn Green / Rique Newby-Estrella	118.95	8	40.06	5	78.89
6	Ai Setoyama / David-Alexandre Paradis	118.84	7	42.03	6	76.81
7	Gabriella Marvaldi / Cody Dolkiewicz	118.64	10	38.26	4	80.38
8	Kay Bergdolt / Miles Addison	117.25	3	46.29	10	70.96
9	Sara Rose / Joseph Goodpaster	114.25	9	38.43	7	75.82
10	Jessica Lee / Brandon Kozlowski	112.40	6	42.77	11	69.63
11	Linde LeChance / Kenneth Anderson	109.91	11	37.56	9	72.35
12	Megan Griffin / Andrew Civiello	97.36	12	33.56	12	63.80

=== Junior ice dance ===
Rank	Name	Total	SP		FS	
1	Lorraine McNamara / Quinn Carpenter	170.04	1	73.42	1	96.62
2	Rachel Parsons / Michael Parsons	165.46	2	70.29	2	95.17
3	Elliana Pogrebinsky / Alex Benoit	155.94	3	65.98	3	89.96
4	Christina Carreira / Anthony Ponomarenko	152.79	4	64.81	5	87.98
5	Julia Biechler / Damian Dodge	146.38	5	57.82	4	88.56
6	Chloe Lewis / Logan Bye	136.45	7	56.02	6	80.43
7	Eliana Gropman / Ian Somerville	135.44	6	57.69	7	77.75
8	Gigi Becker / Luca Becker	126.34	8	52.78	8	73.56
9	Alina Efimova / Kyle MacMillan	113.99	10	49.76	9	64.23
10	Katherine Grosul / Cameron Colucci	111.97	9	52.53	10	59.44
11	Aya Takai / Alexander Martin	103.37	11	49.03	12	54.34
12	Elizabeth Addas / Jonathan Schultz	95.28	12	37.88	11	57.40
13	Rebecca Lucas / Jacob Schedl	91.08	13	37.73	13	53.35

== Novice results ==
=== Novice men ===
Rank	Name	Total	SP		FS	
1	Eric Sjoberg	171.68	1	54.53	1	117.15
2	Peter Liu	151.90	3	52.23	2	99.67
3	Maxim Naumov	148.73	2	53.37	5	95.36
4	William Hubbart	142.83	4	47.46	4	95.37
5	Ryan Dunk	140.94	9	41.51	3	99.43
6	Derek Wagner	128.24	12	34.87	6	93.37
7	Sasha Lunin	127.34	7	44.09	7	83.25
8	Jun-Hong Chen	126.64	5	46.16	9	80.48
9	Max Lake	122.13	8	41.62	8	80.51
10	Paul Yeung	119.05	11	40.87	10	78.18
11	Ryan VanDoren	113.13	6	44.12	11	69.01
12	Mark Sadusky	103.44	10	41.03	12	62.41

=== Novice ladies ===
Rank	Name	Total	SP		FS	
1	Haley Beavers	150.93	1	52.35	1	98.58
2	Alexia Paganini	142.88	2	47.20	2	95.68
3	Sierra Venetta	129.04	3	43.53	3	85.51
4	Ashley Lin	126.09	6	42.28	5	83.81
5	Gabrielle Noullet	124.33	9	39.61	4	84.72
6	Starr Andrews	122.77	4	42.77	6	80.00
7	Mary-Katharine Mulera	118.15	5	42.68	8	75.47
8	Marina Capatina	116.46	8	39.73	7	76.73
9	Gabriella Izzo	113.94	7	42.15	9	71.79
10	Meiryla Findley	104.11	10	35.80	10	68.31
11	Nhi Do	88.28	11	32.95	11	55.33
WD	Kaitlyn Nguyen					

=== Novice pairs ===
Rank	Name	Total	SP		FS	
1	Elli Kopmar / Jonah Barrett	126.13	1	41.66	1	84.47
2	Isabella Gamez / Griffin Schwab	117.70	2	39.89	2	77.81
3	Sapphire Jaeckel / Matthew Scoralle	113.69	6	36.82	4	76.87
4	Emma Coppess / Robert Hennings	112.89	7	35.17	3	77.72
5	Laiken Lockley / Keenan Prochnow	109.96	3	37.74	7	72.22
6	Ashlee Raymond / Misha Mitrofanov	109.56	8	34.61	5	74.95
7	Nica Digerness / Danny Neudecker	108.52	4	37.22	8	71.30
8	Ainsley Peterson / Kristofer Ogren	104.38	9	31.62	6	72.76
9	Katherina Frantz / Nicolas Frantz	102.43	5	36.92	9	65.51
10	Annabel Kim / Jonathan Kim	80.40	11	24.50	10	55.90
11	Sabrina Piliero / Nathaniel Dennler	77.98	10	24.62	11	53.36
12	Cora DeWyre / Jacob Nussle	62.92	12	19.54	12	43.38

=== Novice ice dance ===
Rank	Name	Total	PD1		PD2		FD	
1	Caroline Green / Gordon Green	144.37	1	30.53	1	31.77	1	82.07
2	Emma Gunter / Caleb Wein	122.10	2	25.62	2	24.45	2	72.03
3	Sophia Elder / Christopher Elder	99.21	3	25.26	3	22.18	7	51.77
4	Gianna Buckley / JT Michel	90.26	5	18.22	5	18.07	4	53.97
5	Molly Cesanek / Edward Jahoda	88.75	6	17.30	4	18.63	6	52.82
6	Jillian Moyer / Jarred Druzynski	88.63	4	18.31	6	17.23	5	53.09
7	Amanda Miller / Nikolay Usanov	86.02	9	15.30	7	16.26	3	54.46
8	Allie Rose / Spencer Emerson	78.88	10	14.50	9	15.28	9	49.10
9	Leah Krauskopf / Caleb Niva	76.99	12	13.38	10	14.27	8	49.34
10	Rachel Gart / Lance Stanley	76.72	7	16.53	8	15.34	12	44.85
11	Claire Purnell / Lucas Purnell	75.09	8	16.02	11	12.73	11	46.34
12	Cherri Chen / YuanShi Jin	74.11	11	14.08	12	12.37	10	47.66

== International team selections ==
=== Winter Youth Olympics ===
The team for the 2016 Winter Youth Olympics was announced in October 2015.

	Men	Ladies	Pairs	Ice dancing
1	Camden Pulkinen	Vanna Giang	Sarah Rose / Joseph Goodpaster	Chloe Lewis / Logan Bye
1st alt.				
2nd alt.				
3rd alt.				

=== Four Continents ===
The team for the 2016 Four Continents Championships was announced on January 24, 2016.

	Men	Ladies	Pairs	Ice dancing
	Max Aaron	~~Polina Edmunds~~	Marissa Castelli / Mervin Tran	Madison Chock / Evan Bates
	Grant Hochstein	Gracie Gold	Tarah Kayne / Daniel O'Shea	Madison Hubbell / Zachary Donohue
	~~Adam Rippon~~	~~Ashley Wagner~~	Alexa Scimeca / Chris Knierim	Maia Shibutani / Alex Shibutani
1st alt.	Ross Miner (added)	Mirai Nagasu (added)	Madeline Aaron / Max Settlage	Anastasia Cannuscio / Colin McManus
2nd alt.	Alexander Johnson	Karen Chen (added)	Jessica Calalang / Zack Sidhu	Kaitlin Hawayek / Jean-Luc Baker
3rd alt.	Timothy Dolensky	Courtney Hicks	Jessica Pfund / Joshua Santillan	

=== World Junior Championships ===
The team for the 2016 World Junior Championships was announced on January 24, 2016. Nathan Chen withdrew due to injury and was replaced by first alternate Tomoki Hiwatashi.

	Men	Ladies	Pairs	Ice dancing
	~~Nathan Chen~~	Tyler Pierce	Chelsea Liu / Brian Johnson	Lorraine McNamara / Quinn Carpenter
	Vincent Zhou	Bradie Tennell	Joy Weinberg / Maximiliano Fernandez	Rachel Parsons / Michael Parsons
			Lindsay Weinstein / Jacob Simon	Elliana Pogrebinsky / Alex Benoit
1st alt.	Tomoki Hiwatashi (added)	Emily Chan	Gabriella Marvaldi / Cody Dolkiewicz	Christina Carreira / Anthony Ponomarenko
2nd alt.	Kevin Shum	Vivian Le	Jacquelyn Green / Rique Newby-Estrella	Julia Biechler / Damian Dodge
3rd alt.	Alexei Krasnozhon	Megan Wessenberg	Ai Setoyama / David-Alexandre Paradis	Chloe Lewis / Logan Bye

=== World Championships ===
The team for the 2016 World Championships was announced on January 24, 2016. Nathan Chen withdrew due to injury and was replaced by first alternate Grant Hochstein. On March 23, it was announced that Polina Edmunds withdrew due to an injury and first alternate, Mirai Nagasu will replace her.

	Men	Ladies	Pairs	Ice dancing
	Max Aaron	~~Polina Edmunds~~	Tarah Kayne / Daniel O'Shea	Madison Chock / Evan Bates
	~~Nathan Chen~~	Gracie Gold	Alexa Scimeca / Chris Knierim	Madison Hubbell / Zachary Donohue
	Adam Rippon	Ashley Wagner		Maia Shibutani / Alex Shibutani
1st alt.	Grant Hochstein (added)	Mirai Nagasu (added)	Marissa Castelli / Mervin Tran	Anastasia Cannuscio / Colin McManus
2nd alt.	Ross Miner	Tyler Pierce	Madeline Aaron / Max Settlage	Kaitlin Hawayek / Jean-Luc Baker
3rd alt.	Alexander Johnson	Hannah Miller	Jessica Calalang / Zack Sidhu	
