= Starr Andrews =

American figure skater (born 2001)

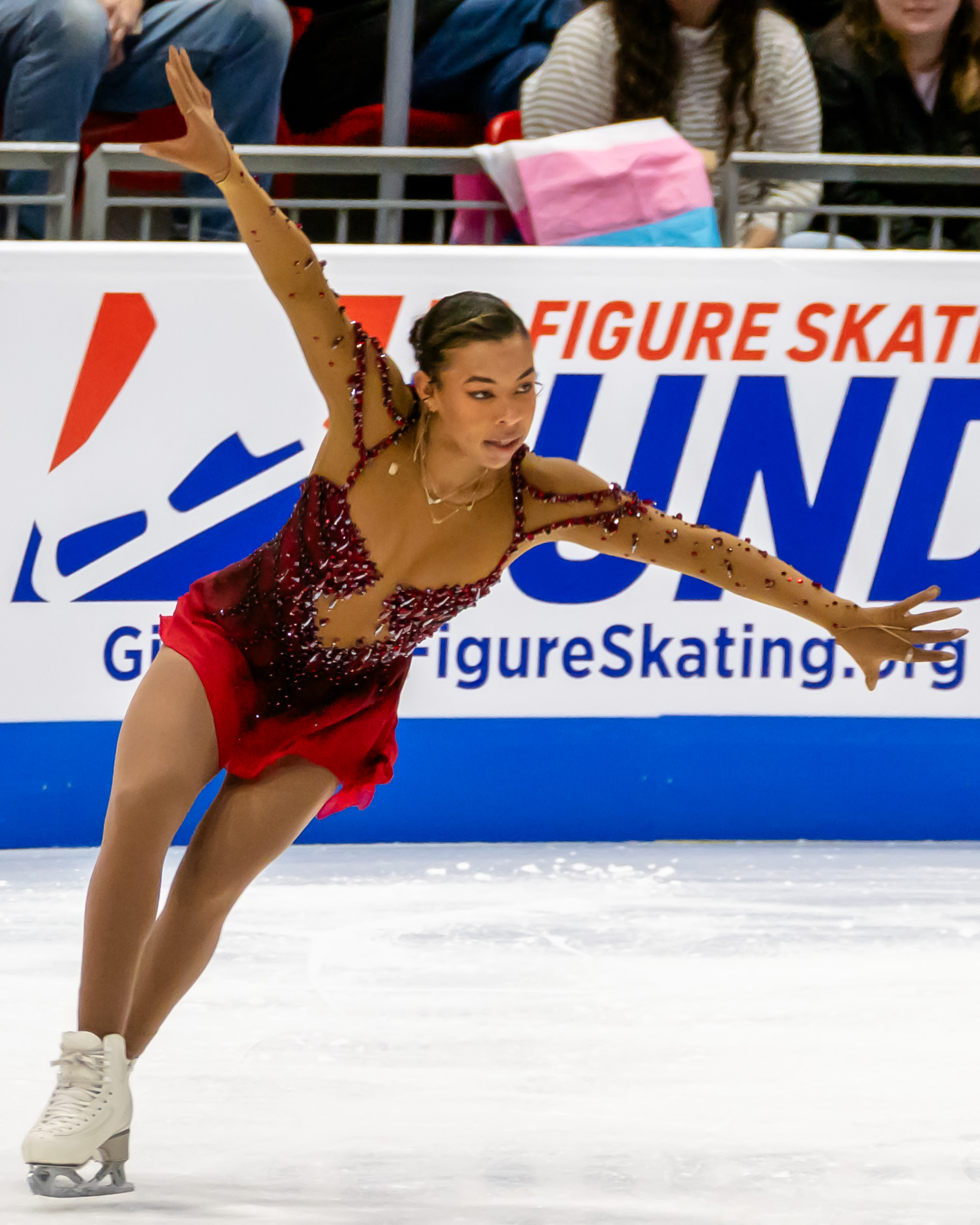
- Andrews at the 2025 Skate America

Personal information
- Full name: Kennedy Starr Andrews
- Born: June 23, 2001 (age 25) Los Angeles, California, United States
- Height: 4 ft 11 in (1.49 m)

Figure skating career
- Country: United States
- Discipline: Pair skating (since 2026); Women's singles (until 2026)
- Partner: Daniil Parkman
- Coach: Jenni Meno; Todd Sand; Brandon Frazier; Christine Binder
- Skating club: Los Angeles Figure Skating Club
- Began skating: 2004

Starr Andrews (born June 23, 2001) is an American figure skater. She is the 2022 Skate Canada International silver medalist, 2023 CS Golden Spin of Zagreb bronze medalist, and 2023 U.S. Nationals pewter medalist. She has finished in the top ten at three ISU Championships and is the first Black American woman to win a Grand Prix medal in the singles discipline. Earlier in her career, Andrews is the 2017 U.S. national junior silver medalist.

In 2026, she teamed up with Daniil Parkman to compete in the pairs discipline.

== Personal life ==
Starr Andrews was born on June 23, 2001, in Los Angeles, California. She was home-schooled. She has a brother and two sisters, including Skylar, a gymnast, and Ashton, a baseball player. Their mother, Toshawa Andrews, has cardiac microvascular disease, which has led to a dozen heart attacks.

== Career ==
=== Singles skating ===
==== Early years ====
Andrews became interested in figure skating after her mother brought her to the ice rink when she was three. She recalled in 2018: "I wanted to get on the ice really, really bad, but I was too small, so I had to wait." She began learning to skate in 2005. A video of nine-year-old Andrews skating to Whip My Hair went viral after appearing on YouTube in December 2010. By March 2018, it had reached 53 million views.

Derrick Delmore became her coach around 2013. Andrews placed 6th on the novice level at the 2016 U.S. Championships.

==== 2016–17 season: Junior international debut ====
Andrews decided to move up to the junior level, coached by Delmore and Peter Kongkasem in Lakewood, California and Riverside, California. Making her international debut, she won the junior ladies title at the Golden Bear of Zagreb in October 2016.

In January, she received the junior silver medal at the 2017 U.S. Championships. After Amber Glenn withdrew, Andrews was added to the U.S. team to the 2017 World Junior Championships in Taipei, Taiwan. At the event, held in March, she qualified to the final segment by placing ninth in the short program and went on to finish twelfth overall.

==== 2017–18 season: Senior international debut ====
Andrews began her season on the junior level, placing fifth at the ISU Junior Grand Prix in Austria. In December, making her senior international debut, she placed sixth at the 2017 CS Golden Spin of Zagreb, where she also obtained the minimum technical scores for both senior-level ISU Championships.

In January, Andrews finished sixth in the senior ladies' category at the 2018 U.S. Championships, having placed eighth in the short program and fifth in the free skate. She was assigned to the 2018 Four Continents, where she placed seventh, and the 2018 World Junior Championships, from which she withdrew. She was replaced by Emmy Ma.

==== 2018–19 season: Grand Prix debut ====
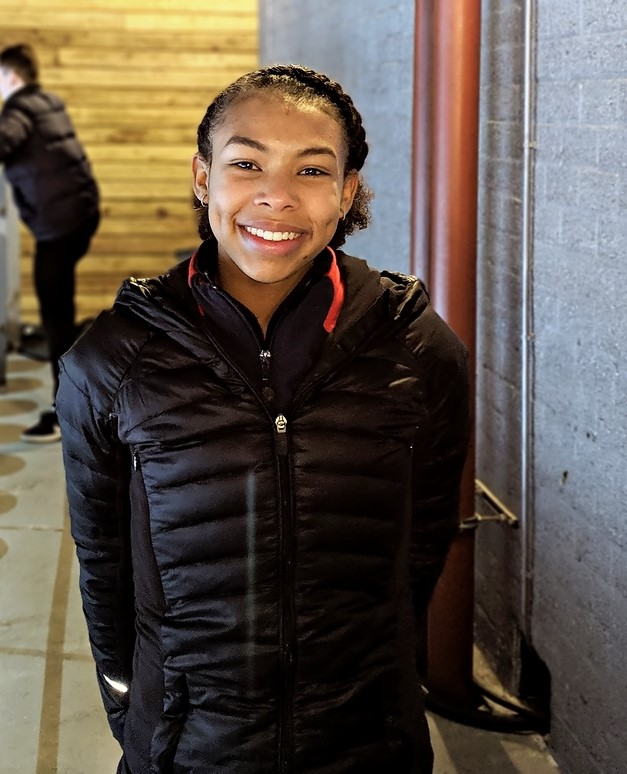
Andrews at the 2019 International Challenge Cup

In early August, Andrews competed at the 2018 CS Asian Open Figure Skating Trophy; she placed second in the short program with a personal best score but dropped to fifth after the free skate. In September, at the 2018 CS Autumn Classic International, she ranked fifth in the short and seventh overall. She attempted the triple Axel in the free program, but her jump had a two-footed landing and was downgraded due to insufficient rotation. She made her Grand Prix debut in October at the 2018 Skate America and placed ninth in the short program, tenth in the free skate, and tenth overall. She was also invited to the 2018 Skate Canada International, where she placed fourth in the short program, ninth in the free skate, and seventh overall.

Andrews would place eighth at the 2019 U.S. Championships before going on to win silver at the 2019 International Challenge Cup and the 2019 Egna Spring Trophy.

==== 2019–20 season ====
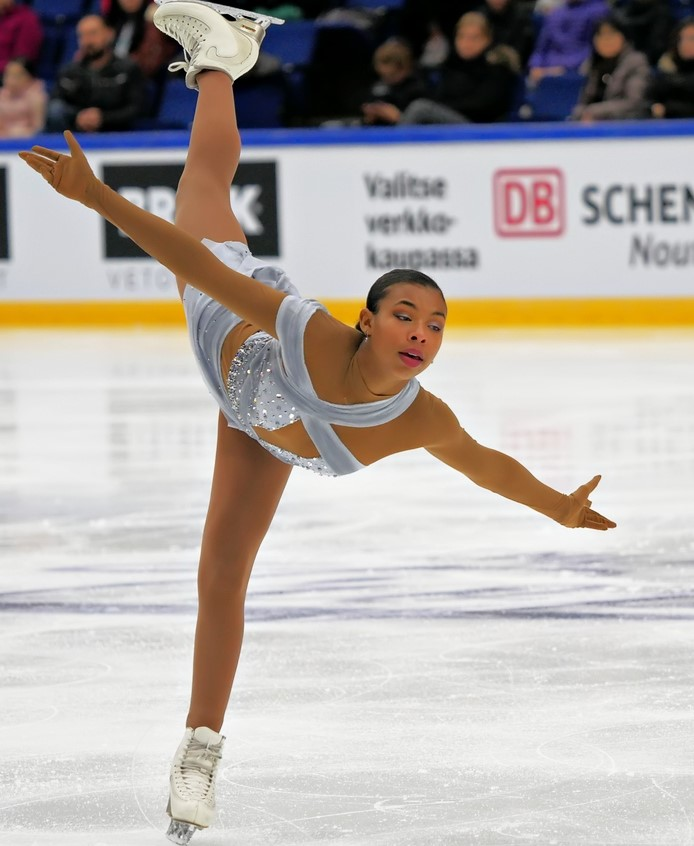
Andrews performing a spiral at the 2019 CS Finlandia Trophy

Beginning on the Challenger series, Andrews placed fifth at both the 2019 CS Lombardia Trophy and the 2019 CS Finlandia Trophy. On the Grand Prix, Andrews placed fourth in the short program at the 2019 Internationaux de France with a new personal best. Fifth in the free skate, she placed fifth overall.

Andrews finished sixth at the 2020 U.S. Championships. Finishing the season at the 2020 World Junior Championships, Andrews placed eighth.

==== 2020–21 season ====
Andrews started her season competing at the ISP Points Challenge, a virtual US domestic competition. At the first opportunity, she placed fourth. She was assigned to compete at the 2020 Skate America in Las Vegas, an event attended only by skaters training in the United States due to the coronavirus pandemic. She placed eighth.

Competing at the 2021 U.S. Championships, also held in Las Vegas, Andrews placed twelfth.

==== 2021–22 season ====
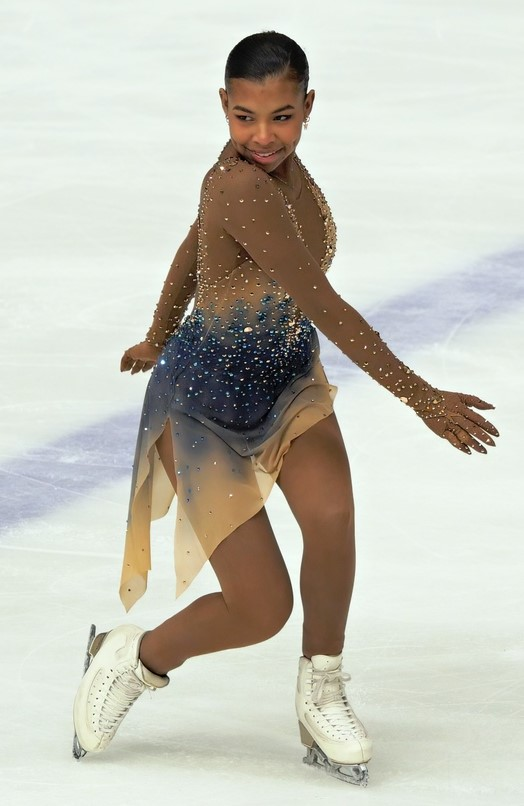
Andrews at the 2021 Cup of Austria

Beginning the Olympic season on the Challenger series, Andrews placed fifth at the 2021 CS Autumn Classic International.

Following Bradie Tennell's withdrawal from the 2021 Skate America, Andrews was named to replace her. She placed tenth at the event. She finished in fifth at the 2021 CS Cup of Austria. She had to withdraw from the 2021 Internationaux de France due to an injury in the warmup.

Andrews finished ninth at the 2022 U.S. Championships. This result earned her an assignment to the 2022 Four Continents Championships, where she came ninth as well. In the spring, she had surgery to treat supraventricular tachycardia, which she had experienced for almost a decade.

==== 2022–23 season: Grand Prix silver & U.S. National pewter medalist ====
Andrews finished in sixth place at the 2022 CS Nebelhorn Trophy to start the season. At her first Grand Prix assignment, the 2022 Skate Canada International, she finished fifth in the short program in a close field. She then "surprised" many by finishing second in the free skate, rising to take the silver medal. She became the first Black American woman to medal in singles in the Grand Prix era that began in 1995, and the second Black woman after Frenchwoman Surya Bonaly. Andrews noted the significance, saying "it is a huge deal for me. I am one of the few people of color in the sport, and to bring home a medal is even more special." Heading into the 2022 NHK Trophy, she planned to add a second flip to her free skate, having recovered from an ankle "tweak" that had necessitated lessening her content in the early events. Fifth in the short program, she dropped to ninth after the free skate, where she singled her planned second flip.

At the 2023 U.S. Championships, Andrews placed narrowly third in the short program. In the free skate she made two jump errors and was overtaken for the bronze medal by Amber Glenn, but she still won the pewter medal and stood on the senior podium for the first time in her career. She was the first African-American woman to stand on the US podium since Debi Thomas in 1988, which Andrews acknowledged as "amazing."

==== 2023–24 season ====
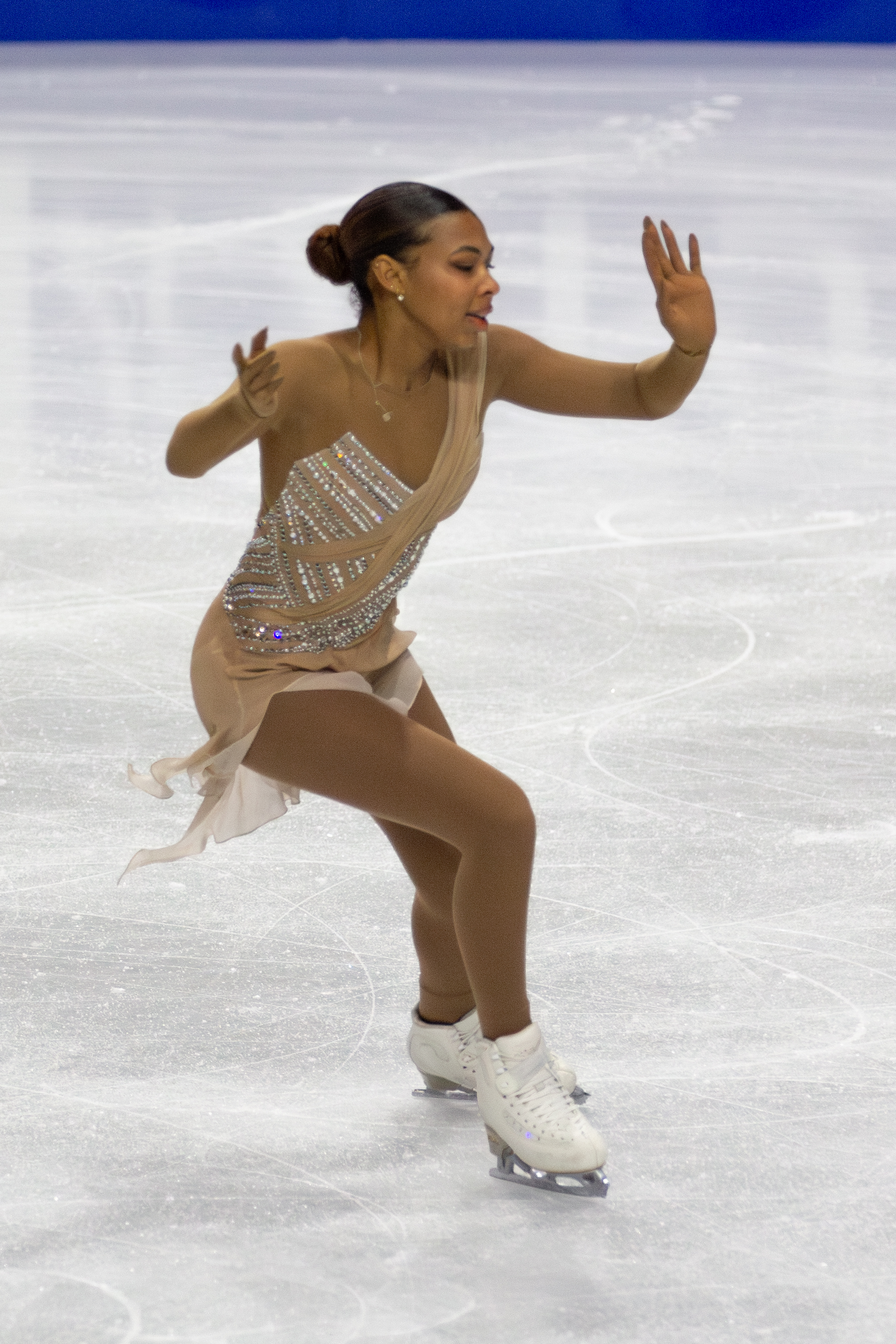
Andrews at the 2023 Skate Canada International

Andrews' preparation for the new season was first delayed while spending time preparing for a potential appearance at Coachella that ultimately did not come to fruition. She then had heart surgery to deal with atrial tachycardia, which she had been dealing with for a decade. She was ultimately able to begin work on her programs by July, but she did not feature in early domestic and international competitions due both to the delays and to an unrelated illness. She finally debuted at the Kings Cup International in early October, winning the silver medal.

Beginning on the Grand Prix at the 2023 Skate Canada International, she finished sixth in the short program. Jump problems in the free skate dropped her to eighth place. She went on came tenth at the 2023 Grand Prix of Espoo.

Competing at the 2023 CS Golden Spin of Zagreb in Croatia, Andrews won the bronze medal.

At the 2024 U.S. Championships, Andrews was ninth in the short program but delivered a strong fifth-place free skate and moved up to sixth overall.

==== 2024–25 season ====
Andrews began the season by competing on the 2024–25 ISU Challenger Series, finishing fifth at the 2024 Cranberry Cup International and tenth at the 2024 Denis Ten Memorial Challenge. In late November, she competed at the 2025 Pacific Coast Sectional Championships, where she won the silver medal, thus qualifying for the U.S. Championships. She then went on to win gold at the 2024 Santa Claus Cup.

At the 2025 U.S. Championships, Andrews placed a disappointing twelfth in the short program but delivered a solid free skate, placing fifth in that segment and finishing in sixth place overall. She then closed the season with a fourth-place finish at the 2025 International Challenge Cup.

==== 2025–26 season: Final season as a singles skater ====
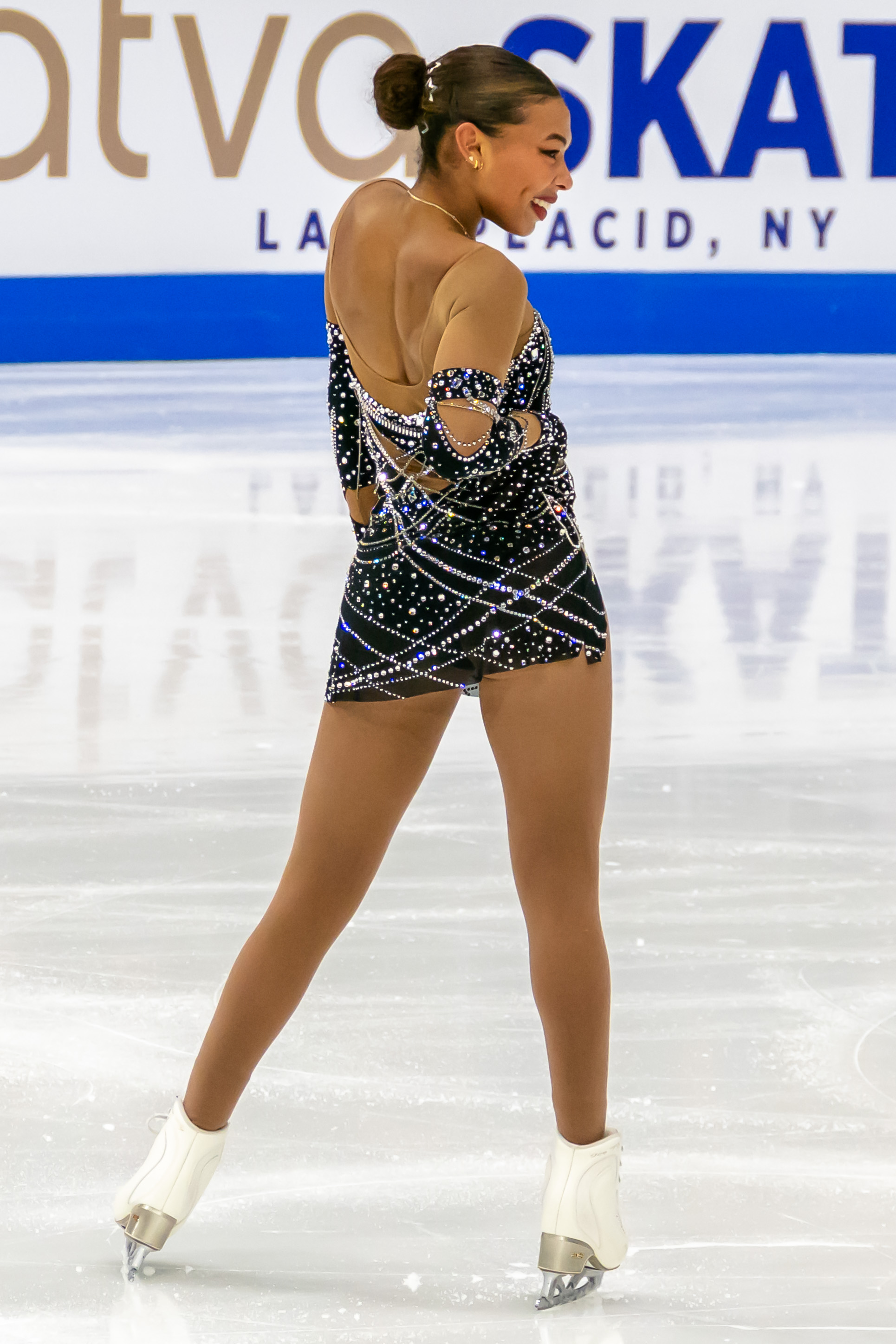
Andrews performing her short program at 2025 Skate America

In preparation for the season, Andrews recorded the vocals for the track, "Turning Page," used for her free skate.

Andrews opened her season by competing on the 2025–26 Challenger Series, placing seventh at the 2025 CS Nepela Memorial and twelfth at the 2025 CS Trialeti Trophy.

In November, Andrews announced that the 2025–26 figure skating season was her last as a singles skater and that she intended to switch disciplines and pursue pair skating beginning with the 2026–27 season. Selected as a host pick for 2025 Skate America, Andrews delivered two clean programs, earning a new personal best free skate and combined total score and placing fifth overall. She subsequently finished fifth at the 2025 CS Tallinn Trophy.

At the 2026 U.S. Championships in January, Andrews finished in seventh place and was subsequently named to the 2026 Four Continents team.

At the 2026 Four Continents, Starr finished 8th after the short program, ultimately dropping to 15th overall after the free skate.

=== Pair skating with Daniil Parkman ===
==== 2026–27 season: Switch to pairs ====
In May 2026, Andrews confirmed her switch to the pairs discipline and announced that she had teamed up with Daniil Parkman. She also stated that they would be coached by Jenni Meno, Todd Sand, Brandon Frazier, and Christine Binder.

Andrews/Parkman opened the season at the 2027 Eastern Sectionals, placing first in the short and free program to win first place overall.

== Programs ==
=== Women's singles ===
Season	Short program	Free skating	Exhibition
2025–26	Run the World (Girls) by Beyoncé choreo. by Adam Rippon, Derrick Delmore	The Fantasy of Happiness (from Interview with the Vampire) by Daniel Hart; Turning Page (from Twilight) by Sleeping at Last performed by Starr Andrews choreo. by Derrick Delmore	
2024–25	Für Elise by Ludwig van Beethoven performed by Faouzia choreo. by Derrick Delmore	Euphoria; Love Is Complicated (The Angels Sing) by Labrinth; I'm Tired by Labrinth & Zendaya choreo. by Adam Rippon	
2023–24	ALIEN SUPERSTAR by Beyoncé choreo. by Adam Rippon	Being Good Isn't Good Enough (from Hallelujah, Baby!) by Jule Styne performed by Lea Michele; Strong and Higher by Karl Hugo choreo. by Derrick Delmore	
2022–23	Dancing With the Devil by Demi Lovato choreo. by Derrick Delmore	Je suis malade by Serge Lama performed by Lara Fabian and Hugo Silver choreo. by Derrick Delmore	Free Your Mind by En Vogue
2021–22	At Last by Mack Gordon, Harry Warren performed by Starr Andrews choreo. by Derrick Delmore	Bigger; I Was Here by Beyonce choreo. by Derrick Delmore	
2020–21	It's a Man's Man's Man's World by James Brown performed by Jurnee Smollett; Joke's on You from Birds of Prey performed by Charlotte Lawrence choreo. by Derrick Delmore	Finally by Fergie choreo. by Derrick Delmore	
2019–20	You Lost Me by Christina Aguilera choreo. by Derrick Delmore	Dance of the Seven Veils (from Salome) by Richard Strauss choreo. by Derrick Delmore	
2018–19	Summertime by George Gershwin performed by Ella Fitzgerald, Louis Armstrong choreo. by Derrick Delmore	African Tribal Xotica; Desert Spirit; Under African Skies by John Herberman; Tribal Gathering by Vanessa-Mae; Xotica: Journey of the Heart by René Dupéré; Minus One by Greg Ellis choreo. by Derrick Delmore	
2017–18	Fever performed by Beyoncé choreo. by Derrick Delmore	One Moment in Time performed by Whitney Houston, Starr Andrews choreo. by Derrick Delmore	
2016–17	The Pink Panther Theme by Henry Mancini	Black Swan by Pyotr Ilyich Tchaikovsky, Clint Mansell; Perfection; A Swan Is Born; Nina's Dream; Perfection	

== Competitive highlights ==
- GP – Event of the ISU Grand Prix Series
- JGP – Event of the ISU Junior Grand Prix Series
- CS – Event of the ISU Challenger Series
- TBD – Assigned
- WD – Withdrew from competition

=== Pair skating with Daniil Parkman ===
Competition placements at senior level
Season	2026–27
CS Warsaw Cup	TBD

=== Women's singles ===
Competition placements at senior level
Season	2017–18	2018–19	2019–20	2020–21	2021–22	2022–23	2023–24	2024–25	2025–26
Four Continents Championships	7th				9th				15th
U.S. Championships	6th	8th	6th	12th	9th	4th	6th	6th	7th
GP Finland							10th		
GP France			5th						
GP NHK Trophy			8th			9th			
GP Skate America		10th		8th	10th				5th
GP Skate Canada		7th				2nd	8th		
CS Asian Open Trophy		5th							
CS Autumn Classic		7th			5th				
CS Cranberry Cup								5th	
CS Cup of Austria					5th				
CS Denis Ten Memorial								10th	
CS Finlandia Trophy			5th						
CS Golden Spin of Zagreb	6th						3rd		
CS Lombardia Trophy			5th						
CS Nebelhorn Trophy						6th			
CS Nepela Memorial									7th
CS Tallinn Trophy									5th
CS Trialeti Trophy									12th
Challenge Cup		2nd						4th	
Coupe du Printemps						2nd			
Egna Spring Trophy		2nd							
Kings Cup							2nd		
Philadelphia Summer	6th		4th						
Santa Claus Cup								1st	

Competition placements at junior level
Season	2016–17	2017–18	2019–20
World Junior Championships	12th		8th
U.S. Championships	2nd		
JGP Austria		5th	
Golden Bear of Zagreb	1st		
Golden Spin of Zagreb			2nd

== Detailed results ==
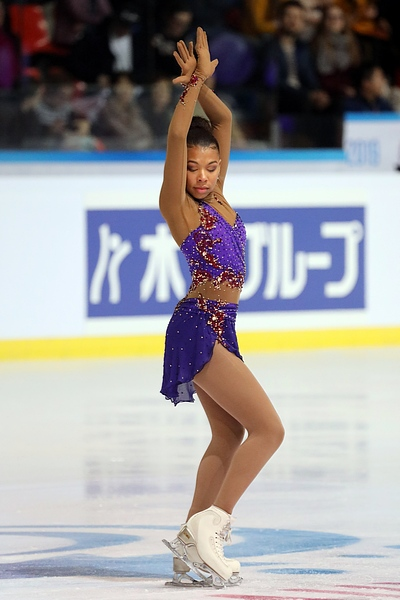
Andrews at the 2019 Internationaux de France

=== Pair skating with Daniil Parkman ===
Results in the 2026–27 season
Date	Event	SP		FS		Total	
Date	Event	P	Score	P	Score	P	Score
Nov 25–29, 2026	(Poland) 2026 CS Warsaw Cup						

=== Women's singles ===
ISU personal best scores in the +5/-5 GOE System
Segment	Type	Score	Event
Total	TSS	195.28	2025 Skate America
Short program	TSS	66.60	2022 Four Continents Championships
Short program	TES	36.86	2019 CS Lombardia Trophy
Short program	PCS	31.06	2022 Four Continents Championships
Free skating	TSS	130.90	2025 Skate America
Free skating	TES	66.52	2025 Skate America
Free skating	PCS	64.38	2025 Skate America

ISU personal best scores in the +3/-3 GOE System
Segment	Type	Score	Event
Total	TSS	172.65	2018 Four Continents Championships
Short program	TSS	60.80	2017 CS Golden Spin of Zagreb
Short program	TES	35.10	2018 Four Continents Championships
Short program	PCS	26.24	2017 CS Golden Spin of Zagreb
Free skating	TSS	112.04	2018 Four Continents Championships
Free skating	TES	58.83	2018 Four Continents Championships
Free skating	PCS	54.21	2018 Four Continents Championships

=== Senior level ===
Results in the 2017–18 season
Date	Event	SP		FS		Total	
Date	Event	P	Score	P	Score	P	Score
Aug 3–6, 2017	(United States) 2017 Philadelphia Summer International	6	56.73	8	93.18	6	149.91
Dec 6–9, 2017	(Croatia) 2017 CS Golden Spin of Zagreb	4	60.80	7	102.69	6	163.49
Dec 29, 2017 – Jan 8, 2018	(United States) 2018 U.S. Championships	8	62.55	5	127.36	6	189.91
Jan 22–27, 2018	(Taiwan) 2018 Four Continents Championships	7	60.61	7	112.04	7	172.65

Results in the 2018–19 season
Date	Event	SP		FS		Total	
Date	Event	P	Score	P	Score	P	Score
Aug 1–5, 2018	(Thailand) 2018 CS Asian Open Trophy	2	62.60	5	97.16	5	159.76
Sep 20–22, 2018	(Canada) 2018 CS Autumn Classic International	5	56.70	7	102.93	7	159.63
Oct 19–21, 2018	(United States) 2018 Skate America	9	56.03	10	94.53	10	150.56
Oct 26–29, 2018	2018 Skate Canada International	4	64.77	9	108.95	7	174.72
Jan 18–27, 2019	(United States) 2019 U.S. Championships	8	58.66	7	117.04	8	175.70
Feb 21–24, 2019	(Netherlands) 2019 International Challenge Cup	3	64.76	3	122.93	2	187.69
Mar 28–31, 2019	(Italy) 2019 Gardena Spring Trophy	1	64.83	2	105.96	2	170.79

Results in the 2019–20 season
Date	Event	SP		FS		Total	
Date	Event	P	Score	P	Score	P	Score
Jul 31 – Aug 3, 2019	(United States) 2019 Philadelphia Summer International	4	53.91	4	94.05	4	147.96
Sep 13–15, 2019	(Italy) 2019 CS Lombardia Trophy	4	66.38	6	114.80	5	181.18
Oct 11–13, 2019	(Finland) 2019 CS Finlandia Trophy	6	57.25	5	111.85	5	169.10
Nov 1–3, 2019	2019 Internationaux de France	4	66.59	5	113.95	5	180.54
Nov 22–24, 2019	(Japan) 2019 NHK Trophy	9	58.92	9	107.80	8	166.72
Jan 20–26, 2020	(United States) 2020 U.S. Championships	7	65.86	6	115.92	6	181.78

Results in the 2020–21 season
Date	Event	SP		FS		Total	
Date	Event	P	Score	P	Score	P	Score
Oct 23–24, 2020	(United States) 2020 Skate America	10	57.20	7	114.50	8	171.70
Jan 11–21, 2021	(United States) 2021 U.S. Championships	17	45.93	10	106.20	12	152.13

Results in the 2021–22 season
Date	Event	SP		FS		Total	
Date	Event	P	Score	P	Score	P	Score
Sep 16–18, 2021	(Canada) 2021 CS Autumn Classic International	4	59.21	7	96.04	5	155.25
Oct 22–24, 2021	(United States) 2021 Skate America	10	61.94	11	115.69	10	177.63
Nov 11–14, 2021	2021 CS Cup of Austria	7	53.78	6	103.57	5	157.35
Jan 3–9, 2022	(United States) 2022 U.S. Championships	11	59.43	9	113.61	9	173.04
Jan 18–23, 2022	(Estonia) 2022 Four Continents Championships	6	66.60	12	106.41	9	173.01

Results in the 2022–23 season
Date	Event	SP		FS		Total	
Date	Event	P	Score	P	Score	P	Score
Sep 21–24, 2022	(Germany) 2022 CS Nebelhorn Trophy	7	53.31	6	103.29	6	156.60
Oct 28–30, 2022	2022 Skate Canada International	5	64.69	2	126.57	2	191.26
Nov 18–20, 2022	(Japan) 2022 NHK Trophy	5	64.13	12	109.93	9	174.06
Jan 23–29, 2023	(United States) 2023 U.S. Championships	3	68.97	7	119.27	4	188.24
Mar 17–19, 2023	(Luxembourg) 2023 Coupe du Printemps	2	64.89	3	115.70	2	180.59

Results in the 2023–24 season
Date	Event	SP		FS		Total	
Date	Event	P	Score	P	Score	P	Score
Oct 5–8, 2023	(United States) 2023 Kings Cup International	1	65.79	3	101.16	2	166.95
Oct 27–29, 2023	2023 Skate Canada International	6	61.07	8	113.75	8	174.82
Nov 17–19, 2023	(Finland) 2023 Grand Prix of Espoo	9	57.63	10	97.06	10	154.42
Dec 6–9, 2023	(Croatia) 2023 CS Golden Spin of Zagreb	6	53.98	3	111.57	3	165.55
Jan 22–28, 2024	(United States) 2024 U.S. Championships	9	60.35	5	125.14	6	185.49

Results in the 2024–25 season
Date	Event	SP		FS		Total	
Date	Event	P	Score	P	Score	P	Score
Aug 8–11, 2024	(United States) 2024 CS Cranberry Cup International	5	57.19	5	107.70	5	164.89
Oct 3–6, 2024	(Kazakhstan) 2024 CS Denis Ten Memorial Challenge	6	59.10	10	92.55	10	151.65
Nov 27 – Dec 2, 2024	(Hungary) 2024 Santa Claus Cup	1	64.32	2	104.38	1	168.70
Jan 20–26, 2025	(United States) 2025 U.S. Championships	12	59.45	5	126.52	6	185.97
Feb 13–16, 2025	(Netherlands) 2025 Challenge Cup	4	65.61	4	114.37	4	179.89

Results in the 2025–26 season
Date	Event	SP		FS		Total	
Date	Event	P	Score	P	Score	P	Score
Sep 25–27, 2025	(Slovakia) 2025 CS Nepela Memorial	4	60.67	8	106.57	7	167.24
Oct 8–11, 2025	(Georgia (country)) 2025 CS Trialeti Trophy	4	61.65	15	96.73	12	158.38
Nov 14–16, 2025	(United States) 2025 Skate America	6	64.38	5	130.90	5	195.28
Nov 25–30, 2025	(Estonia) 2025 CS Tallinn Trophy	3	66.33	5	112.07	5	178.40
Jan 4–11, 2026	(United States) 2026 U.S. Championships	6	65.77	9	117.73	7	183.50
Jan 21–25, 2026	(China) 2026 Four Continents Championships	8	65.82	15	94.92	15	160.74

=== Junior level ===
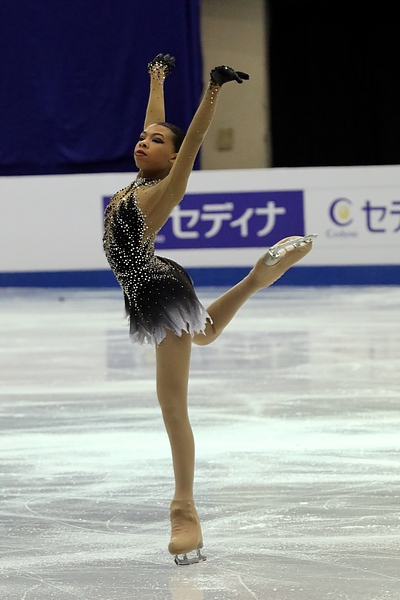
Andrews at the 2017 World Junior Championships

Results in the 2016–17 season
Date	Event	SP		FS		Total	
Date	Event	P	Score	P	Score	P	Score
Oct 27–30, 2016	(Croatia) 2016 Golden Bear of Zagreb	1	63.27	1	108.75	1	172.02
Jan 14–22, 2017	(United States) 2017 U.S. Championships (Junior)	2	57.83	2	97.31	2	155.14
Mar 15–19, 2017	(Taiwan) 2017 World Junior Championships	9	55.83	12	93.22	12	149.05

Results in the 2017–18 season
Date	Event	SP		FS		Total	
Date	Event	P	Score	P	Score	P	Score
Aug 31 – Sep 2, 2017	2017 JGP Austria	4	59.93	5	99.35	5	159.28

Results in the 2019–20 season
Date	Event	SP		FS		Total	
Date	Event	P	Score	P	Score	P	Score
Dec 4–7, 2019	(Croatia) 2019 Golden Spin of Zagreb	2	55.91	2	105.62	2	161.53
Mar 2–8, 2020	(Estonia) 2020 World Championships	7	65.31	8	115.56	8	180.87
