= Sean Rabbitt =

American figure skater

Personal information
- Born: April 8, 1990 (age 36) Orange, California
- Home town: Yorba Linda, California

Figure skating career
- Country: United States
- Coach: Tammy Gambill
- Skating club: Glacier Falls FSC
- Began skating: 1993
- Retired: November 13, 2020

Sean Rabbitt (born April 8, 1990) is an American retired figure skater. He is the 2015 Autumn Classic International bronze medalist.

== Programs ==
Season	Short program	Free skating
2019–2020	Nessun dorma (from Turandot) by Giacomo Puccini choreo. by Sean Rabbitt	España cañí by Pascual Marquina Narro choreo. by Sean Rabbitt
2018–2019	East of Eden by Lee Holdridge choreo by Sean Rabbitt	West Side Story Leonard Bernstein choreo by Sean Rabbitt
2017–2018	Somewhere in Time by John Barry choreo by Sean Rabbitt	Mambo medley by Perez Prado
2016–2017	East of Eden by Lee Holdridge choreo by Sean Rabbitt	Mambo medley by Perez Prado
2015–2016	Danse Bacchanale (from Samson and Delilah) by Camille Saint-Saëns	Concerto in F by George Gershwin
2014–2015	Danse Bacchanale (from Samson and Delilah) by Camille Saint-Saëns choreo. by Justin Dillon	Sing Sing Sing, Part 2 (from Fosse) choreo. by Cindy Stuart
2013–2014	Who Wants To Live Forever choreo. by Justin Dillon	Sing Sing Sing, Part 2 (from Fosse) choreo. by Cindy Stuart
2012–2013	Down With Love choreo. by Cindy Stuart	Daphnis et Chloe choreo. by Karen Kwan-Oppegard

== Competitive highlights ==
CS: Challenger Series

=== Senior career ===
International
Event	10–11	11–12	12–13	13–14	14–15	15–16	16–17	17–18	18–19	19-20
CS Golden Spin						15th				
CS U.S. Classic							7th	8th		
CS Nepela Trophy									7th	
Autumn Classic						3rd				
Philadelphia								8th		
National
U.S. Champ.	20th		19th	14th	12th	9th	8th	14th	8th	9th

=== Juvenile to junior career ===
National
Event	09–10
U.S. Champ.	11th J
Levels: J = Junior

== Detailed results ==
Small medals for short and free programs awarded only at ISU Championships. Pewter medals for fourth-place finishes awarded only at U.S. national and regional events. At team events, medals awarded for team results only.

=== Senior career ===
2018–19 season
Date	Event	SP	FS	Total
January 22–27, 2019	2019 U.S. Championships	7; 79.66	9; 138.18	8; 217.84
19–22 September 2018	2018 CS Ondrej Nepela Trophy	6; 70.98	7; 124.85	7; 193.83
2017–18 season
Date	Event	SP	FS	Total
Dec. 29 – Jan. 8, 2018	2018 U.S. Championships	13; 73.29	12; 141.24	14; 214.53
September 13–17, 2017	2017 U.S. Classic	9; 68.60	7; 135.86	8; 204.46
August 3–5, 2017	2017 Philadelphia Summer International	8; 62.66	5; 134.99	8; 197.65
2016–17 season
Date	Event	SP	FS	Total
January 14–22, 2017	2017 U.S. Championships	11; 73.41	7; 154.61	8; 228.02
September 14–17, 2016	2017 U.S. Classic	7; 72.45	7; 137.21	7; 209.66
2015–16 season
Date	Event	SP	FS	Total
January 15–24, 2016	2016 U.S. Championships	9; 66.71	10; 125.92	9; 192.63
December 2–5, 2015	2015 CS Golden Spin of Zagreb	15; 54.34	12; 119.75	15; 174.09
October 13–15, 2015	2015 Autumn Classic International	4; 64.75	3; 136.95	3; 201.70
2014–15 season
Date	Event	SP	FS	Total
January 17–25, 2015	2015 U.S. Championships	11; 71.39	12; 139.85	12; 211.24
2013–14 season
Date	Event	SP	FS	Total
January 17–25, 2015	2014 U.S. Championships	15; 60.58	14; 122.76	14; 183.34
2012–13 season
Date	Event	SP	FS	Total
January 19–27, 2013	2013 U.S. Championships	15; 62.87	18; 118.79	19; 181.66
2010–11 season
Date	Event	SP	FS	Total
January 22–30, 2011	2011 U.S. Championships	21; 51.42	19; 104.29	20; 155.71
