= 2017 U.S. Figure Skating Championships =

Figure skating competition

- Type: National Championship
- Date: January 14 – 22
- Season: 2016–17
- Location: Kansas City, Missouri
- Host: U.S. Figure Skating
- Venue: Sprint Center; Silverstein Eye Centers Arena

Champions
- Men's singles: Nathan Chen (S); Alexei Krasnozhon (J)
- Ladies' singles: Karen Chen (S); Kaitlyn Nguyen (J)
- Pairs: Haven Denney / Brandon Frazier (S); Nica Digerness / Danny Neudecker (J)
- Ice dance: Maia Shibutani / Alex Shibutani (S); Rachel Parsons / Michael Parsons (J)
- Previous: 2016 U.S. Championships
- Next: 2018 U.S. Championships

The 2017 Prudential U.S. Figure Skating Championships were held from January 14–22 at the Sprint Center in Kansas City, Missouri and Silverstein Eye Centers Arena in Independence, Missouri. Medals were awarded in the disciplines of men's singles, ladies singles, pair skating, and ice dancing at the senior, junior, novice, intermediate, and juvenile levels. The results were part of the U.S. selection criteria for the 2017 Four Continents, 2017 World Junior Championships, and the 2017 World Championships.

Kansas City was announced as the host in December 2015.

== Qualifying ==
Competitors qualified at regional and sectional competitions held from October to November 2016 or earned a bye.

| Date | Event | Type | Location | Results |
|---|---|---|---|---|
| Sept. 28–Oct. 2, 2016 | North Atlantic | Regional | Williamsville, New York | Details |
| Sept. 28–Oct. 2, 2016 | Eastern Great Lakes | Regional | Lansing, Michigan | Details |
| Sept. 28–Oct. 2, 2016 | Southwest Pacific | Regional | Scottsdale, Arizona | Details |
| October 5–9, 2016 | Central Pacific | Regional | Ogden, Utah | Details |
| October 5–9, 2016 | South Atlantic | Regional | Ashburn, Virginia | Details |
| October 5–9, 2016 | Southwestern | Regional | Plano, Texas | Details |
| October 19–23, 2016 | New England | Regional | Burlington, Vermont | Details |
| October 19–23, 2016 | Northwest Pacific | Regional | Wenatchee, Washington | Details |
| October 19–23, 2016 | Upper Great Lakes | Regional | Rochester, Minnesota | Details |
| November 16–20, 2016 | Eastern | Sectional | Indian Trail, North Carolina | Details |
| November 16–20, 2016 | Midwestern | Sectional | Colorado Springs, Colorado | Details |
| November 16–20, 2016 | Pacific Coast | Sectional | Salt Lake City, Utah | Details |
| January 14–22, 2017 | U.S. Championship | Final | Kansas City, Missouri | Details |

In November 2016, U.S. Figure Skating published the list of skaters who had qualified or received a bye to the 2017 U.S. Championships. A number of skaters later withdrew, including Adam Rippon, Polina Edmunds, Alexa Scimeca Knierim / Chris Knierim, Caitlin Fields / Ernie Utah Stevens, and Jessica Calalang / Zack Sidhu.

== Medal summary ==
=== Senior ===
| Discipline | Gold | Silver | Bronze | Pewter |
|---|---|---|---|---|
| Men | Nathan Chen | Vincent Zhou | Jason Brown | Grant Hochstein |
| Ladies | Karen Chen | Ashley Wagner | Mariah Bell | Mirai Nagasu |
| Pairs | Haven Denney / Brandon Frazier | Marissa Castelli / Mervin Tran | Ashley Cain / Timothy LeDuc | Deanna Stellato / Nathan Bartholomay |
| Ice dancing | Maia Shibutani / Alex Shibutani | Madison Chock / Evan Bates | Madison Hubbell / Zachary Donohue | Elliana Pogrebinsky / Alex Benoit |

=== Junior ===
| Discipline | Gold | Silver | Bronze | Pewter |
|---|---|---|---|---|
| Men | Alexei Krasnozhon | Camden Pulkinen | Ryan Dunk | Eric Sjoberg |
| Ladies | Kaitlyn Nguyen | Starr Andrews | Ashley Lin | Emmy Ma |
| Pairs | Nica Digerness / Danny Neudecker | Elli Kopmar / Jonah Barrett | Alexandria Yao / Austin Hale | Lindsay Weinstein / Jacob Simon |
| Ice dancing | Rachel Parsons / Michael Parsons | Christina Carreira / Anthony Ponomarenko | Lorraine McNamara / Quinn Carpenter | Chloe Lewis / Logan Bye |

=== Novice ===
| Discipline | Gold | Silver | Bronze | Pewter |
|---|---|---|---|---|
| Men | Maxim Naumov | Joseph Kang | Dinh Tran | Joonsoo Kim |
| Ladies | Angelina Huang | Ting Cui | Pooja Kalyan | Alysa Liu |
| Pairs | Erin Coleman / Derrick Griffin | Ainsley Peterson / Kristofer Ogren | Greta Crafoord / John Crafoord | Eliana Secunda / Blake Eisenach |
| Ice dancing | Jocelyn Haines / James Koszuta | Katerina DelCamp / Maxwell Gart | Sophia Elder / Christopher Elder | Elizabeth Tkachenko / Alexei Kiliakov |

=== Intermediate ===
| Discipline | Gold | Silver | Bronze | Pewter |
|---|---|---|---|---|
| Men | Ilia Malinin | Nicholas Hsieh | Philip Baker | Daniel Argueta |
| Ladies | Stephanie Ciarochi | Emilia Murdock | Ariela Masarsky | Emily Zhang |
| Pairs | Masha Mokhova / Ivan Mokhov | Jade Esposito / Franz-Peter Jerosch | Isabelle Martins / Ryan Bedard | Altice Sollazo / Paul Yeung |
| Ice dancing | Katarina Wolfkostin / Howard Zhao | Layla Karnes / Jeffrey Chen | Paulina Brykalova / Daniel Brykalov | Maria Soldatova / Faddey Soldatov |

=== Juvenile ===
| Discipline | Gold | Silver | Bronze | Pewter |
|---|---|---|---|---|
| Men | William Annis | Robert Yampolsky | Kai Kovar | Liam Kapeikis |
| Ladies | Madison Nguyen | Tamnhi Hyunh | Haley Scott | Elise Freezer |
| Pairs | Sydney Flaum / Chase Finster | Josephine Hagan / Evan Whitlow | Jasmine Wong / Danylo Siianytsia | Ashley Fletcher / Cayden McKenzie-Cook |
| Ice dancing | Nastia Efimova / Jonathan Zhao | Alice Serbin / Kenan Slevira | Elliana Peal / Ethan Peal | Sarah Dutton / Emmett King |

== Senior results ==
=== Senior men ===
| Rank | Name | Total | SP | | FS | |
|---|---|---|---|---|---|---|
| 1 | Nathan Chen | 318.47 | 1 | 106.39 | 1 | 212.08 |
| 2 | Vincent Zhou | 263.03 | 3 | 87.85 | 2 | 175.18 |
| 3 | Jason Brown | 254.23 | 4 | 79.23 | 3 | 175.00 |
| 4 | Grant Hochstein | 248.31 | 5 | 79.10 | 4 | 169.21 |
| 5 | Ross Miner | 240.34 | 2 | 88.67 | 8 | 151.67 |
| 6 | Alexander Johnson | 233.39 | 9 | 75.19 | 5 | 158.20 |
| 7 | Timothy Dolensky | 228.76 | 6 | 78.86 | 9 | 149.90 |
| 8 | Sean Rabbitt | 228.02 | 11 | 73.41 | 7 | 154.61 |
| 9 | Max Aaron | 227.80 | 12 | 72.54 | 6 | 155.26 |
| 10 | Jordan Moeller | 225.85 | 8 | 76.24 | 10 | 149.61 |
| 11 | Andrew Torgashev | 225.35 | 7 | 77.82 | 11 | 147.53 |
| 12 | Kevin Shum | 205.69 | 14 | 71.77 | 12 | 133.92 |
| 13 | Emmanuel Savary | 200.73 | 10 | 73.75 | 16 | 126.98 |
| 14 | Scott Dyer | 199.47 | 16 | 69.90 | 14 | 129.57 |
| 15 | Tomoki Hiwatashi | 196.09 | 13 | 71.79 | 18 | 124.30 |
| 16 | Daniel Kulenkamp | 193.74 | 17 | 65.08 | 15 | 128.66 |
| 17 | Shotaro Omori | 191.53 | 20 | 58.81 | 13 | 132.72 |
| 18 | Oleksiy Melnyk | 184.31 | 19 | 59.86 | 17 | 124.45 |
| 19 | Dennis Phan | 181.14 | 18 | 60.78 | 19 | 120.36 |
| 20 | Jimmy Ma | 181.07 | 15 | 70.41 | 21 | 110.66 |
| 21 | Sebastien Payannet | 170.56 | 21 | 57.07 | 20 | 113.49 |

=== Senior ladies ===
| Rank | Name | Total | SP | | FS | |
|---|---|---|---|---|---|---|
| 1 | Karen Chen | 214.22 | 1 | 72.82 | 1 | 141.40 |
| 2 | Ashley Wagner | 211.78 | 3 | 70.94 | 2 | 140.84 |
| 3 | Mariah Bell | 197.92 | 6 | 63.33 | 3 | 134.59 |
| 4 | Mirai Nagasu | 194.90 | 2 | 71.95 | 4 | 122.95 |
| 5 | Caroline Zhang | 182.82 | 7 | 62.55 | 5 | 120.27 |
| 6 | Gracie Gold | 179.62 | 5 | 64.85 | 9 | 114.77 |
| 7 | Angela Wang | 175.13 | 11 | 58.16 | 7 | 116.97 |
| 8 | Amber Glenn | 172.63 | 12 | 56.34 | 8 | 116.29 |
| 9 | Bradie Tennell | 169.98 | 9 | 59.77 | 11 | 110.21 |
| 10 | Tessa Hong | 168.74 | 4 | 65.02 | 14 | 103.72 |
| 11 | Paige Rydberg | 166.92 | 8 | 61.60 | 12 | 105.32 |
| 12 | Courtney Hicks | 165.19 | 18 | 46.02 | 6 | 119.17 |
| 13 | Livvy Shilling | 161.90 | 10 | 59.73 | 15 | 102.17 |
| 14 | Megan Wessenberg | 161.77 | 16 | 48.96 | 12 | 112.81 |
| 15 | Franchesca Chiera | 158.41 | 13 | 53.97 | 13 | 104.44 |
| 16 | Katie McBeath | 141.20 | 15 | 49.33 | 17 | 91.87 |
| 17 | Rebecca Peng | 134.36 | 19 | 41.08 | 16 | 93.28 |
| 18 | Hannah Miller | 134.24 | 17 | 48.73 | 18 | 85.51 |
| 19 | Ashley Shin | 127.87 | 14 | 49.86 | 19 | 78.01 |

=== Senior pairs ===
Kayne/O'Shea withdrew due to a concussion. She hit her head while attempting a throw triple flip during the short program on January 19.

| Rank | Name | Total | SP | | FS | |
|---|---|---|---|---|---|---|
| 1 | Haven Denney / Brandon Frazier | 188.32 | 2 | 65.39 | 1 | 122.93 |
| 2 | Marissa Castelli / Mervin Tran | 186.28 | 4 | 64.29 | 2 | 121.99 |
| 3 | Ashley Cain / Timothy LeDuc | 184.41 | 1 | 69.33 | 3 | 115.08 |
| 4 | Deanna Stellato / Nathan Bartholomay | 173.50 | 3 | 65.04 | 5 | 108.46 |
| 5 | Jessica Pfund / Joshua Santillan | 168.90 | 7 | 58.05 | 4 | 110.85 |
| 6 | Chelsea Liu / Brian Johnson | 159.96 | 8 | 57.02 | 6 | 102.94 |
| 7 | Erika Smith / AJ Reiss | 159.59 | 6 | 59.30 | 7 | 100.29 |
| 8 | Cali Fujimoto / Nicholas Barsi-Rhyne | 138.90 | 10 | 44.84 | 8 | 94.06 |
| 9 | Joy Weinberg / Maximiliano Fernandez | 132.57 | 11 | 42.71 | 9 | 89.86 |
| WD | Tarah Kayne / Danny O'Shea | 61.80 | 5 | 61.80 | withdrew from competition | |
| WD | Alexandria Shaughnessy / James Morgan | 48.64 | 9 | 48.64 | withdrew from competition | |
| WD | Jacquelyn Green / Rique Newby-Estrella | withdrew from competition | | | | |

=== Senior ice dance ===
| Rank | Name | Total | SP | | FS | |
|---|---|---|---|---|---|---|
| 1 | Maia Shibutani / Alex Shibutani | 200.05 | 1 | 82.42 | 2 | 117.63 |
| 2 | Madison Chock / Evan Bates | 199.04 | 2 | 79.96 | 1 | 119.08 |
| 3 | Madison Hubbell / Zachary Donohue | 191.42 | 3 | 79.72 | 3 | 111.70 |
| 4 | Elliana Pogrebinsky / Alex Benoit | 170.29 | 5 | 67.17 | 4 | 103.12 |
| 5 | Kaitlin Hawayek / Jean-Luc Baker | 160.06 | 4 | 72.60 | 8 | 87.46 |
| 6 | Anastasia Cannuscio / Colin McManus | 153.35 | 8 | 56.94 | 5 | 96.41 |
| 7 | Julia Biechler / Damian Dodge | 152.19 | 6 | 59.15 | 6 | 93.04 |
| 8 | Karina Manta / Joseph Johnson | 147.15 | 7 | 57.96 | 7 | 89.19 |
| 9 | Charlotte Maxwell / Ryan Devereaux | 139.20 | 9 | 56.88 | 9 | 82.32 |
| 10 | Elicia Reynolds / Stephen Reynolds | 103.57 | 10 | 40.83 | 10 | 62.74 |
| 11 | Kseniya Ponomaryova / Oleg Altukhov | 93.29 | 11 | 38.89 | 11 | 54.40 |

== Junior results ==
=== Junior men ===
| Rank | Name | Total | SP | | FS | |
|---|---|---|---|---|---|---|
| 1 | Alexei Krasnozhon | 211.05 | 2 | 66.89 | 1 | 144.16 |
| 2 | Camden Pulkinen | 197.65 | 1 | 73.41 | 2 | 124.24 |
| 3 | Ryan Dunk | 172.22 | 4 | 57.78 | 3 | 114.44 |
| 4 | Eric Sjoberg | 170.61 | 3 | 60.73 | 4 | 109.88 |
| 5 | Sasha Lunin | 161.39 | 5 | 56.60 | 5 | 104.79 |
| 6 | Mathew Graham | 158.39 | 6 | 54.57 | 6 | 104.39 |
| 7 | Peter Liu | 154.82 | 8 | 52.47 | 7 | 102.35 |
| 8 | Derek Wagner | 153.25 | 7 | 52.85 | 8 | 100.40 |
| 9 | Kelvin Li | 147.69 | 9 | 50.39 | 9 | 97.30 |
| 10 | Daniil Shamis | 135.55 | 11 | 40.93 | 10 | 94.62 |
| 11 | TJ Nyman | 130.53 | 10 | 41.51 | 11 | 89.02 |
| WD | Kendrick Weston | withdrew from competition | | | | |

=== Junior ladies ===
| Rank | Name | Total | SP | | FS | |
|---|---|---|---|---|---|---|
| 1 | Kaitlyn Nguyen | 170.16 | 3 | 57.80 | 1 | 112.36 |
| 2 | Starr Andrews | 155.14 | 2 | 57.83 | 3 | 97.31 |
| 3 | Ashley Lin | 153.34 | 5 | 52.38 | 2 | 100.96 |
| 4 | Emmy Ma | 149.88 | 1 | 60.31 | 5 | 89.57 |
| 5 | Alexia Paganini | 147.60 | 4 | 52.90 | 4 | 94.70 |
| 6 | Nina Ouellette | 136.25 | 7 | 49.65 | 6 | 86.60 |
| 7 | Maxine Marie Bautista | 133.97 | 6 | 52.37 | 9 | 81.60 |
| 8 | Elizaveta Kulik | 132.51 | 8 | 48.36 | 7 | 84.15 |
| 9 | Brynne McIsaac | 127.51 | 9 | 44.84 | 8 | 82.67 |
| 10 | Madalyn Moree | 108.89 | 11 | 42.76 | 10 | 66.13 |
| 11 | Haley Beavers | 108.72 | 10 | 44.29 | 12 | 64.43 |
| 12 | Shannon Porter | 107.94 | 12 | 42.60 | 11 | 65.34 |

=== Junior pairs ===
| Rank | Name | Total | SP | | FS | |
|---|---|---|---|---|---|---|
| 1 | Nica Digerness / Danny Neudecker | 153.35 | 1 | 54.66 | 1 | 98.69 |
| 2 | Elli Kopmar / Jonah Barrett | 147.90 | 2 | 54.01 | 2 | 93.89 |
| 3 | Alexandria Yao / Austin Hale | 144.64 | 3 | 53.55 | 3 | 91.09 |
| 4 | Lindsay Weinstein / Jacob Simon | 137.22 | 4 | 52.48 | 5 | 84.74 |
| 5 | Laiken Lockley / Keenan Prochnow | 135.67 | 8 | 47.45 | 4 | 88.22 |
| 6 | Vanessa Chen / Eric Hartley | 131.46 | 5 | 49.22 | 7 | 82.24 |
| 7 | Gabriella Marvaldi / Daniel Villeneuve | 130.25 | 6 | 48.81 | 8 | 81.44 |
| 8 | Emma Coppess / Robert Hennings | 128.74 | 9 | 46.42 | 6 | 82.32 |
| 9 | Isabella Gamez / Griffin Schwab | 126.73 | 7 | 47.94 | 9 | 78.79 |
| 10 | Kate Finster / Brandon Kozlowski | 117.80 | 10 | 44.10 | 10 | 73.70 |
| 11 | Jillian Smart / Matthew Rounis | 105.52 | 11 | 39.82 | 12 | 65.70 |
| 12 | Hannah Klopstock / Daniel Arsenault | 101.79 | 12 | 34.47 | 11 | 67.32 |

=== Junior ice dance ===
| Rank | Name | Total | SP | | FS | |
|---|---|---|---|---|---|---|
| 1 | Rachel Parsons / Michael Parsons | 176.33 | 1 | 72.42 | 1 | 103.91 |
| 2 | Christina Carreira / Anthony Ponomarenko | 165.06 | 3 | 66.77 | 2 | 98.29 |
| 3 | Lorraine McNamara / Quinn Carpenter | 163.63 | 2 | 70.44 | 3 | 93.19 |
| 4 | Chloe Lewis / Logan Bye | 148.43 | 4 | 60.60 | 4 | 87.83 |
| 5 | Caroline Green / Gordon Green | 129.82 | 6 | 50.54 | 5 | 79.28 |
| 6 | Eliana Gropman / Ian Somerville | 127.90 | 5 | 52.95 | 6 | 74.95 |
| 7 | Alina Efimova / Alexander Petrov | 118.90 | 7 | 50.27 | 7 | 68.63 |
| 8 | Diana Avaz / Val Katsman | 117.56 | 8 | 50.18 | 8 | 67.38 |
| 9 | Emma Gunter / Caleb Wein | 115.90 | 9 | 49.37 | 9 | 66.53 |
| 10 | Elizabeth Addas / Michael Valdez | 108.02 | 11 | 45.62 | 10 | 62.40 |
| 11 | Lydia Erdman / Alexey Shchepetov | 106.31 | 10 | 46.51 | 11 | 59.80 |
| 12 | Cassidy Klopstock / Jacob Schedl | 96.20 | 12 | 38.97 | 12 | 57.23 |
| WD | Heidi Washburn / Ilya Yukhimuk | withdrew from competition | | | | |

== Novice results ==
=== Novice men ===
| Rank | Name | Total | SP | | FS | |
|---|---|---|---|---|---|---|
| 1 | Maxim Naumov | 177.85 | 1 | 55.82 | 1 | 122.03 |
| 2 | Joseph Kang | 166.59 | 2 | 52.04 | 2 | 114.55 |
| 3 | Dinh Tran | 149.41 | 3 | 51.98 | 6 | 97.43 |
| 4 | Joonsoo Kim | 147.95 | 5 | 47.60 | 4 | 100.35 |
| 5 | Lucas Altieri | 146.26 | 6 | 47.50 | 5 | 98.76 |
| 6 | Paul Yeung | 144.38 | 9 | 43.77 | 3 | 100.61 |
| 7 | Jordan Evans | 139.38 | 4 | 48.35 | 9 | 91.03 |
| 8 | Patrick Frohling | 135.76 | 12 | 42.28 | 7 | 93.48 |
| 9 | Jonathan Yang | 135,62 | 11 | 42,81 | 8 | 92,81 |
| 10 | Alan Wong | 129.03 | 10 | 43.15 | 10 | 85.88 |
| 11 | Alex Wellman | 127,24 | 7 | 47.36 | 12 | 79.88 |
| 12 | Max Wang | 124.61 | 8 | 44.53 | 11 | 80.08 |

=== Novice ladies ===
| Rank | Name | Total | SP | | FS | |
|---|---|---|---|---|---|---|
| 1 | Angelina Huang | 143.19 | 2 | 48.66 | 2 | 94.53 |
| 2 | Ting Cui | 142.68 | 3 | 47.63 | 1 | 95.05 |
| 3 | Pooja Kalyan | 131.77 | 5 | 47.35 | 4 | 84.42 |
| 4 | Alysa Liu | 131.68 | 1 | 48.89 | 6 | 82.79 |
| 5 | Alyssa Rich | 130.89 | 4 | 47.47 | 5 | 83.42 |
| 6 | Hanna Harrell | 126.69 | 10 | 39.24 | 3 | 87.45 |
| 7 | Isabella Miller | 121.45 | 8 | 43.26 | 7 | 78.19 |
| 8 | Ilana Sherman | 117.72 | 6 | 45.16 | 9 | 72.56 |
| 9 | Audrey Shin | 115.92 | 9 | 40.12 | 8 | 75.80 |
| 10 | Emma Coppess | 110.79 | 7 | 43.44 | 10 | 67.35 |
| 11 | Lily Sun | 102.37 | 12 | 36.48 | 11 | 65.89 |
| 12 | Analise Gonzalez | 97.45 | 11 | 37.71 | 12 | 59.74 |

=== Novice pairs ===
| Rank | Name | Total | SP | | FS | |
|---|---|---|---|---|---|---|
| 1 | Erin Coleman / Derrick Griffin | 134.44 | 1 | 45.58 | 1 | 88.86 |
| 2 | Ainsley Peterson / Kristofer Ogren | 120.86 | 2 | 39.67 | 2 | 81.19 |
| 3 | Greta Crafoord / John Crafoord | 112.03 | 3 | 39.14 | 3 | 72.89 |
| 4 | Eliana Secunda / Blake Eisenach | 104.47 | 4 | 36.04 | 5 | 68.43 |
| 5 | Katherina Frantz / Nicolas Frantz | 103.08 | 7 | 32.63 | 4 | 70.45 |
| 6 | Jasmine Fendi / Joshua Fendi | 101.56 | 5 | 34.82 | 6 | 66.74 |
| 7 | Isabelle Goldstein / Keyton Bearinger | 98.97 | 6 | 34.11 | 7 | 64.86 |
| 8 | Cora DeWyre / Jacob Nussle | 88.54 | 8 | 27.56 | 8 | 60.98 |
| 9 | Lauren Ball / Scott Dudley | 80.19 | 9 | 25.94 | 10 | 54.25 |
| 10 | Ashley Haywood / Alec Schmitt | 79.43 | 11 | 23.90 | 9 | 55.53 |
| 11 | Hilary Asher / Nathan Rensing | 73.65 | 10 | 24.06 | 11 | 49.59 |

=== Novice ice dance ===
| Rank | Name | Total | PD1 | | PD2 | | FD | |
|---|---|---|---|---|---|---|---|---|
| 1 | Jocelyn Haines / James Koszuta | 114.66 | 1 | 25.63 | 4 | 21.48 | 1 | 67.55 |
| 2 | Katerina DelCamp / Maxwell Gart | 108.97 | 3 | 21.95 | 6 | 20.24 | 2 | 66.78 |
| 3 | Sophia Elder / Christopher Elder | 108.79 | 2 | 22.88 | 1 | 23.05 | 3 | 62.86 |
| 4 | Elizabeth Tkachenko / Alexei Kiliakov | 100.41 | 4 | 20.94 | 2 | 23.04 | 5 | 56.43 |
| 5 | Isabella Amoia / Cory Fraiman | 95.84 | 6 | 20.14 | 8 | 18.86 | 4 | 56.84 |
| 6 | Allie Rose / Spencer Emerson | 91.07 | 8 | 16.93 | 3 | 22.42 | 8 | 51.72 |
| 7 | Molly Cesanek / Nikolay Usanov | 88.18 | 5 | 20.34 | 11 | 13.70 | 6 | 54.14 |
| 8 | Isabel Blahunka / Will Shawver | 87.15 | 10 | 14.37 | 5 | 20.35 | 7 | 52.43 |
| 9 | Cherri Chen / YuanShi Jin | 83.54 | 7 | 17.69 | 7 | 19.82 | 10 | 46.03 |
| 10 | Leah Krauskopf / Caleb Niva | 80.35 | 11 | 13.87 | 9 | 18.31 | 9 | 48.17 |
| 11 | Claire Purnell / Lucas Purnell | 75.18 | 9 | 15.13 | 10 | 15.32 | 11 | 44.73 |
| 12 | Susan Talbot / Ryan O'Donnell | 60.41 | 12 | 9.61 | 12 | 10.42 | 12 | 40.38 |

== International team selections ==
According to a rule change made by U.S. Figure Skating in autumn 2016 and approved in December, champions at the 2017 U.S. Championships no longer automatically qualify to the World Championships.

=== Four Continents ===
The team for the 2017 Four Continents Championships was announced on January 21 and 22, 2017.

| | Men | Ladies | Pairs | Ice dancing |
|---|---|---|---|---|
| | Jason Brown | Mariah Bell | Ashley Cain / Timothy LeDuc | Madison Chock / Evan Bates |
| | Nathan Chen | Karen Chen | Haven Denney / Brandon Frazier | Madison Hubbell / Zachary Donohue |
| | Grant Hochstein | Mirai Nagasu | Alexa Scimeca Knierim / Chris Knierim | Maia Shibutani / Alex Shibutani |
| 1st alt. | Ross Miner | Gracie Gold | Marissa Castelli / Mervin Tran | Kaitlin Hawayek / Jean-Luc Baker |
| 2nd alt. | Max Aaron | Courtney Hicks | Deanna Stellato / Nathan Bartholomay | Elliana Pogrebinsky / Alex Benoit |
| 3rd alt. | Alexander Johnson | Angela Wang | Jessica Pfund / Joshua Santillan | Anastasia Cannuscio / Colin McManus |

=== World Junior Championships ===
The team for the 2017 World Junior Championships was announced on January 21 and 22, 2017.

| | Men | Ladies | Pairs | Ice dancing |
|---|---|---|---|---|
| | Alexei Krasnozhon | Amber Glenn | Chelsea Liu / Brian Johnson | Christina Carreira / Anthony Ponomarenko |
| | Andrew Torgashev | Bradie Tennell | Nica Digerness / Danny Neudecker | Lorraine McNamara / Quinn Carpenter |
| | Vincent Zhou | | | Rachel Parsons / Michael Parsons |
| 1st alt. | Camden Pulkinen | Starr Andrews | Alexandria Yao / Austin Hale | Chloe Lewis / Logan Bye |
| 2nd alt. | Kevin Shum | Ashley Lin | Gabriella Marvaldi / Daniel Villeneuve | Eliana Gropman / Ian Somerville |
| 3rd alt. | Tomoki Hiwatashi | Tessa Hong | Laiken Lockley / Keenan Prochnow | Emma Gunter / Caleb Wein |

=== World Championships ===
The team for the 2017 World Championships was announced on January 21 and 22, 2017.

| | Men | Ladies | Pairs | Ice dancing |
|---|---|---|---|---|
| | Jason Brown | Mariah Bell | Haven Denney / Brandon Frazier | Madison Chock / Evan Bates |
| | Nathan Chen | Karen Chen | Alexa Scimeca Knierim / Chris Knierim | Madison Hubbell / Zachary Donohue |
| | | Ashley Wagner | | Maia Shibutani / Alex Shibutani |
| 1st alt. | Vincent Zhou | Mirai Nagasu | Ashley Cain / Timothy LeDuc | Kaitlin Hawayek / Jean-Luc Baker |
| 2nd alt. | Grant Hochstein | Gracie Gold | Marissa Castelli / Mervin Tran | Elliana Pogrebinsky / Alex Benoit |
| 3rd alt. | Max Aaron | Caroline Zhang | Deanna Stellato / Nathan Bartholomay | Julia Biechler / Damian Dodge |
