= Max Aaron =

American figure skater (born 1992)

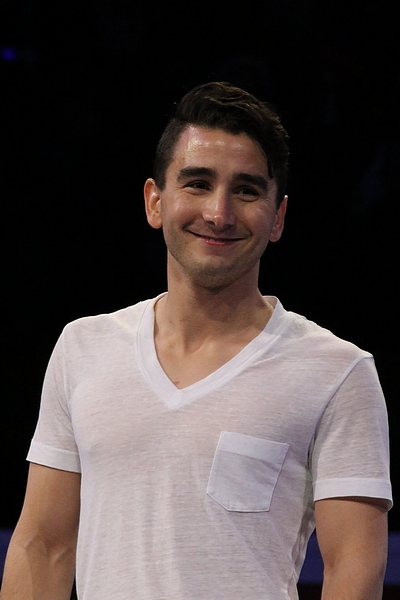
- Aaron during the exhibition gala at the 2016 World Championships

Personal information
- Full name: Maxwell Theodore Aaron
- Born: February 25, 1992 (age 34) Scottsdale, Arizona, U.S.
- Height: 5 ft 8 in (1.73 m)

Figure skating career
- Country: United States
- Discipline: Men's singles
- Began skating: 1996
- Retired: April 19, 2018
- Highest WS: 11th (2015–16 & 2014–15)

Medal record
U.S. Championships
Gold medal – first place	2013 Omaha	Singles
Silver medal – second place	2016 Saint Paul	Singles
Bronze medal – third place	2014 Boston	Singles
World Team Trophy
Gold medal – first place	2013 Tokyo	Team
Gold medal – first place	2015 Tokyo	Team

Maxwell Theodore "Max" Aaron (born February 25, 1992) is an American former figure skater. He is the 2013 U.S. national champion, the 2015 Skate America champion, the 2011 U.S. national junior champion, and a three-time U.S. International Classic champion (2012, 2013, and 2014). Aaron announced his retirement from figure skating on April 19, 2018.

== Personal life ==
Maxwell Theodore Aaron was born in Scottsdale, Arizona. The second of three children born to Mindy, a nurse, and Neil, a pediatrician, he has two sisters, Madeline and Molly, both of whom have competed in pair skating. He is Jewish, and was raised in a traditionally Conservative Jewish home. He said:

I grew up looking to all those Jewish athletes for inspiration. I always thought the list needed to be longer. We needed to have a stronger representation of Jewish athletes, and I’m so happy that I’m part of them now.

Aaron attended Chaparral High School in Scottsdale and later Cheyenne Mountain High School, graduating in 2010. He received the Principal's List Award and was on the honor roll for four years. He then began studying at Pikes Peak Community College and the University of Colorado Colorado Springs, where he majors in finance with a minor in communication.

== Career ==
=== Early years ===
Aaron began skating as a hockey player at age four, and took up figure skating at age nine to improve his skating skills. He competed in the USA Hockey nationals in 2006 and 2007. In 2007, he played U16 AAA hockey and was chosen for the US National Team Development Program. He led his league in goals and penalties for two years.

In the US Championships for figure skating, Aaron finished in 5th in the novice category in 2007 and 13th in the junior category in 2008. He continued to compete in both sports until he fractured the right and left of his L5 lumbar vertebrae. He spent four months in a body cast and another four in physical therapy, and was required to stay off the ice for a year.

Aaron later moved from Scottsdale, Arizona, where he had skated at the Ice Den, to Colorado Springs, Colorado, to train at the Broadmoor Skating Club and the World Arena. There, he picked Tom Zakrajsek as his head coach and Christy Krall for additional technical advice.

=== 2009–10 to 2010–11 ===
Aaron won the bronze medal at the U.S. national junior championships.

The following season, he won a silver medal at the SBC Cup in Karuizawa, Japan. He then won the national junior title. He then competed in the 2011 World Junior Championships in Gangneung, South Korea, and placed 5th.

=== 2012–13 season ===
Aaron won gold at the 2012 U.S. International Classic. He took silver at the 2012 Cup of Nice. At the age of 20, Aaron won the 2013 U.S. Championships. His West Side Story free skate helped him score a total of 255 points to win the gold, ahead of silver medalist Ross Miner and three-time winner Jeremy Abbott.

=== 2013–14 season ===
Aaron made his Grand Prix debut at the 2013 Skate America. In sixth place after the short, he placed second in the free and pulled up to win the bronze medal behind winner Tatsuki Machida and silver medalist Adam Rippon. He placed 7th at the NHK Trophy.

At the 2014 U. Championships, he took the bronze medal and was named to the 2014 World Championships. His 8th-place result at Worlds with Jeremy Abbott's 5th-place finish allowed the U.S. to regain its third spot in the men's event.

=== 2014–15 season ===
Aaron won gold at his first ISU Challenger Series (CS) event, the 2014 U.S. International Classic. Turning to the Grand Prix series, he won the bronze medal at the 2014 Skate Canada International and placed 7th at the 2014 Rostelecom Cup. He finished fourth at the 2015 U.S. Championships.

=== 2015–16 season ===
Aaron began his season with silver at the 2015 Nebelhorn Trophy followed by gold at a Grand Prix event, the 2015 Skate America. At the 2015 Trophée Éric Bompard, he placed 7th in the short program, which became the final result after the event was cancelled due to the November 2015 Paris attacks. Later that month, he was awarded gold at the 2015 Tallinn Trophy.

Aaron won the silver medal at the 2016 U.S. Championships. At the 2016 World Championships in Boston, he ranked 8th in the short program and went on to set a new record for a United States male skater in the free skate, earning a total of 254.14 points, although this was broken a few minutes later by his teammate Adam Rippon. Aaron finished in eighth place.

=== 2016–17 season ===
Aaron decided to modify his approach to quad jumps, stating in August 2016: "I'm using an inside three turn (entrance). [...] It's kind of old school in a way, but it's been working. I wanted to try something new because obviously the three-turn wasn't working under pressure."

Aaron began his season with a pair of bronze medals, earned at the 2016 Autumn Classic International and 2016 Lombardia Trophy. He finished 4th at the 2016 Cup of China, 5th at the 2016 Rostelecom Cup, and 9th at the 2017 U.S. Championships.

=== 2017–18 season ===
Aaron won silver at the 2017 U.S. International Classic and bronze at a Grand Prix event, the 2017 Cup of China. He placed 7th at his other Grand Prix assignment, the 2017 Internationaux de France, and 9th at the 2018 U.S. Championships.

U.S. Figure Skating did not select Aaron for the 2018 Winter Olympics but chose him for the 2018 Four Continents Championships and named him as a third alternate for the 2018 World Championships. He placed 5th in Taipei and was later called up to compete in Milan, where he finished 11th. He announced his retirement from competitive skating on April 19, 2018.

== Programs ==
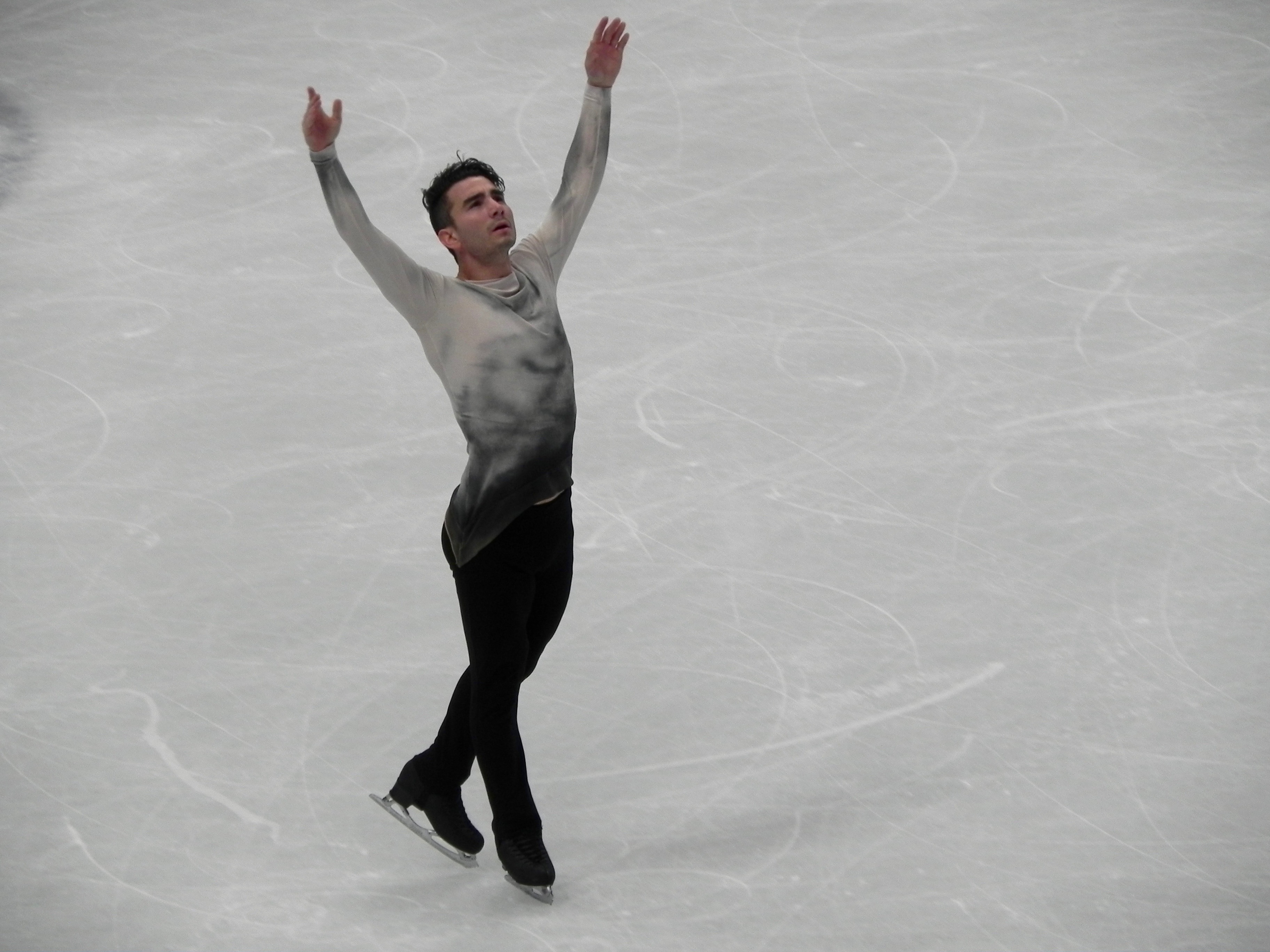
Aaron at the 2018 World Championships

Season	Short program	Free skate	Exhibition	Ref.
2005–06	—N/a	Les Misérables By Claude-Michel Schönberg	—N/a	
2006–07	—N/a	The Sea Hawk By Erich Wolfgang Korngold	—N/a	
2007–08	Piano Concerto in A By Edvard Grieg Performed by Maksim Mrvica	Gladiator By Hans Zimmer	—N/a	
2008–09	In the Stone; Drumline By Maurice White, David Foster & Allee Willis	"Speak Softly Love" (Love Theme from The Godfather) By Nino Rota	—N/a	
2009–10	Once Upon a Time	Concierto de Aranjuez By Joaquín Rodrigo	—N/a	
2010–11	"El Tango de Roxanne" From Moulin Rouge!	"Winter"; "Summer" From The Four Seasons By Antonio Vivaldi Arranged by David Garrett	"Feeling Good" By Michael Bublé	
2011–12	"Oblivion" By Astor Piazzolla Performed by Lucia Micarelli	Tosca By Giacomo Puccini	—N/a	
2012–13	Tron By Daft Punk	West Side Story By Leonard Bernstein & Stephen Sondheim	"Black Betty" By Ram Jam	
2013–14	Historia de un Amor By Perez Prado Choreo. by Pasquale Camerlengo	Carmen Suite Performed by Rodion Shchedrin and the Boston Pops Choreo. by Lori Nichol	"It's a Man's Man's Man's World" By James Brown	
2014–15	"Footloose" By Kenny Loggins Choreo. by Mark Pillay	Gladiator By Hans Zimmer & Lisa Gerrard Choreo. by Pasquale Camerlengo	"Black Betty"	
2014–15	"Nessun dorma" By Giacomo Puccini Performed by Luciano Pavarotti Choreo. by Phillip Mills	Black Swan By Clint Mansell Choreo. by Phillip Mills	"Black Betty"	
2015–16	"Nessun dorma" By Giacomo Puccini Performed by Luciano Pavarotti Choreo. by Phillip Mills	Black Swan By Clint Mansell Choreo. by Phillip Mills	"Thunderstruck" By AC/DC	
2016–17	"Nessun dorma" By Giacomo Puccini Performed by Luciano Pavarotti Choreo. by Phillip Mills	The Lion King By Hans Zimmer Choreo. by Phillip Mills	"Black Betty"	
2016–17	"La Virgen de la Macarena" By Arturo Sandoval	The Lion King By Hans Zimmer Choreo. by Phillip Mills	"Thunderstruck"	
2017–18	Les Misérables By Claude-Michel Schönberg; 1. "Bring Him Home"; 2. "One Day More" Choreo. by Katherine Hill	The Phantom of the Opera By Andrew Lloyd Webber Choreo. by Katherine Hill	—N/a	

== Competitive highlights ==
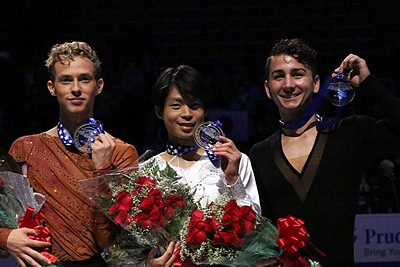
Aaron (right) at the 2013 Skate America podium.

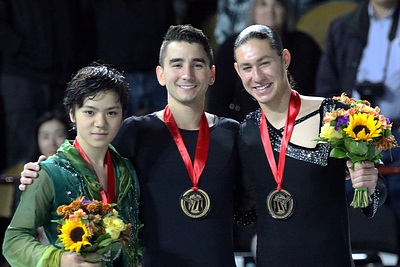
Aaron (center) at the 2015 Skate America podium.

- GP – Event of the Grand Prix
- JGP – Event of the ISU Junior Grand Prix Series
- CS – Event of the Challenger Series
- Medals at team events are awarded for the team results only. Individual placements at team events are listed in parentheses.

Competition placements at senior level
Season	2011–12	2012–13	2013–14	2014–15	2015–16	2016–17	2017–18
World Championships		7th	8th		8th		11th
Four Continents Championships		4th			7th		5th
U.S. Championships	8th	1st	3rd	4th	2nd	9th	9th
World Team Trophy		1st (4th)		1st (8th)			
GP Cup of China						4th	3rd
GP France					7th		7th
GP NHK Trophy			7th				
GP Rostelecom Cup				7th		5th	
GP Skate America			3rd		1st		
GP Skate Canada				3rd			
CS Autumn Classic						3rd	
CS Lombardia Trophy						3rd	
CS Nebelhorn Trophy	5th				2nd		
CS Tallinn Trophy					1st		
CS U.S. Classic		1st	1st	1st			2nd
Cup of Nice		2nd					
Philadelphia Summer							3rd

Competition placements at junior level
Season	2007–08	2009–10	2010–11
World Junior Championships			5th
Junior Grand Prix Final			4th
U.S. Championships	13th	3rd	1st
JGP France			3rd
JGP Japan			2nd
Gardena Spring Trophy		2nd	

== Detailed results ==
ISU personal best scores in the +3/-3 GOE System
Segment	Type	Score	Event
Total	TSS	261.56	2017 CS U.S. International Classic
Short program	TSS	87.03	2015 CS Tallinn Trophy
Short program	TES	48.41	2017 CS U.S. International Classic
Short program	PCS	40.71	2018 Four Continents Championships
Free skating	TSS	176.58	2017 Cup of China
Free skating	TES	96.60	2017 Cup of China
Free skating	PCS	81.30	2015 Skate America

- Small medals for the short program and free skating are only awarded at ISU Championships.
- At national events in the United States, pewter medals are awarded for fourth place.
- Medals at team events are awarded for the team results only. Individual placements at team events are listed in parentheses.

=== Senior level ===
Results in the 2011–12 season
Date	Event	SP		FS		Total	
Date	Event	P	Score	P	Score	P	Score
Sep 21–24, 2011	(Germany) 2011 Nebelhorn Trophy	8	65.64	3	138.53	5	204.17
Jan 22–29, 2012	(United States) 2012 U.S. Championships	6	76.01	13	135.14	8	211.15

Results in the 2012–13 season
Date	Event	SP		FS		Total	
Date	Event	P	Score	P	Score	P	Score
Sep 13–16, 2012	(United States) 2012 U.S. International Classic	1	74.69	1	156.58	1	231.27
Oct 24–28, 2012	(France) 2012 International Cup of Nice	2	75.95	3	143.67	2	219.62
Jan 19–27, 2013	(United States) 2013 U.S. Championships	4	79.13	1	175.87	1	255.00
Feb 8–11, 2013	(Japan) 2013 Four Continents Championships	10	72.46	2	162.19	4	234.65
Mar 11–17, 2013	(Canada) 2013 World Championships	8	78.20	6	160.16	7	238.36
Apr 11–14, 2013	(Japan) 2013 World Team Trophy	6	77.38	3	159.24	1 (4)	236.62

Results in the 2013–14 season
Date	Event	SP		FS		Total	
Date	Event	P	Score	P	Score	P	Score
Sep 12–14, 2013	(United States) 2013 U.S. International Classic	1	81.49	1	157.72	1	239.21
Oct 17–20, 2013	(United States) 2013 Skate America	6	75.91	2	162.45	3	238.36
Nov 8–10, 2013	(Japan) 2013 NHK Trophy	8	76.21	7	147.14	7	223.35
Jan 5–12, 2014	(United States) 2014 U.S. Championships	4	86.95	3	173.49	3	260.44
Mar 24–30, 2014	(Japan) 2014 World Championships	9	78.32	8	147.34	8	225.66

Results in the 2014–15 season
Date	Event	SP		FS		Total	
Date	Event	P	Score	P	Score	P	Score
Sep 11–14, 2014	(United States) 2014 CS U.S. International Classic	1	78.96	1	161.26	1	240.22
Oct 31 – Nov 2, 2014	2014 Skate Canada International	5	76.50	3	155.27	3	231.77
Nov 14–16, 2014	(Russia) 2014 Rostelecom Cup	6	77.09	6	135.51	7	212.60
Jan 18–25, 2015	(United States) 2015 U.S. Championships	4	85.78	4	173.41	4	259.19
Apr 16–19, 2015	(Japan) 2015 World Team Trophy	7	76.08	8	151.43	1 (8)	227.51

Results in the 2015–16 season
Date	Event	SP		FS		Total	
Date	Event	P	Score	P	Score	P	Score
Sep 24–26, 2015	(Germany) 2015 CS Nebelhorn Trophy	1	83.46	3	139.48	2	222.94
Oct 23–25, 2015	(United States) 2015 Skate America	1	86.67	2	172.28	1	258.95
Nov 13, 2015	(France) 2015 Trophée Éric Bompard	7	72.91	—N/a	—N/a	7	—N/a
Nov 18–22, 2015	(Estonia) 2015 CS Tallinn Trophy	1	87.03	1	165.13	1	252.16
Jan 16–24, 2016	(United States) 2016 U.S. Championships	1	91.83	3	177.72	2	269.55
Feb 16–21, 2016	(Taiwan) 2016 Four Continents Championships	8	69.48	6	151.46	7	220.94
Mar 28 – Apr 3, 2016	(United States) 2016 World Championships	8	81.28	7	172.86	8	254.14

Note: The 2015 Trophée Éric Bompard was cancelled after the November 2015 Paris attacks. The short programs had been completed on November 13, but the free skating was to be held the next day. On November 23, the International Skating Union announced that the short program results would be considered as the final results for the competition.

Results in the 2016–17 season
Date	Event	SP		FS		Total	
Date	Event	P	Score	P	Score	P	Score
Sep 8–11, 2016	(Italy) 2016 CS Lombardia Trophy	3	72.93	3	145.80	3	218.73
Sep 29 – Oct 1, 2016	(Canada) 2016 CS Autumn Classic International	5	70.74	2	155.39	3	226.13
Nov 4–6, 2016	(Russia) 2016 Rostelecom Cup	8	73.64	4	161.94	5	235.58
Nov 18–20, 2016	2016 Cup of China	5	81.67	3	161.07	4	242.74
Jan 14–22, 2017	(United States) 2017 U.S. Championships	12	72.54	6	155.26	9	227.80

Results in the 2017–18 season
Date	Event	SP		FS		Total	
Date	Event	P	Score	P	Score	P	Score
Aug 3–5, 2017	(United States) 2017 Philadelphia Summer International	3	74.00	4	135.37	3	209.37
Sep 13–17, 2017	(United States) 2017 CS U.S. International Classic	2	86.06	2	175.50	2	261.56
Nov 3–5, 2017	2017 Cup of China	5	83.11	1	176.58	3	259.69
Nov 17–19, 2017	2017 Internationaux de France	8	78.64	6	158.56	7	237.20
Dec 29, 2017 – Jan 8, 2018	(United States) 2018 U.S. Championships	12	74.95	10	149.25	9	224.20
Jan 22–28, 2018	(Taiwan) 2018 Four Continents Championships	6	84.15	4	171.30	5	255.45
Mar 19–25, 2018	(Italy) 2018 World Championships	15	79.78	10	161.71	11	241.40

=== Junior level ===
Results in the 2007–08 season
Date	Event	SP		FS		Total	
Date	Event	P	Score	P	Score	P	Score
Jan 20–27, 2008	(United States) 2008 U.S. Championships (Junior)	13	49.52	14	97.46	13	146.98

Results in the 2009–10 season
Date	Event	SP		FS		Total	
Date	Event	P	Score	P	Score	P	Score
Jan 14–24, 2010	(United States) 2010 U.S. Championships (Junior)	1	62.17	3	129.69	3	191.86
Apr 1–3, 2010	(Italy) 2010 Gardena Spring Trophy	3	53.84	2	105.03	2	158.87

Results in the 2010–11 season
Date	Event	SP		FS		Total	
Date	Event	P	Score	P	Score	P	Score
Aug 25–28, 2010	2010 JGP France	2	64.31	3	113.69	3	178.00
Sep 22–26, 2010	2010 JGP Japan	1	66.28	5	113.54	2	179.82
Dec 8–12, 2010	(China) 2010–11 Junior Grand Prix Final	5	63.78	4	117.50	4	181.28
Jan 22–30, 2011	(United States) 2011 U.S. Championships (Junior)	2	62.95	1	125.72	1	188.67
Feb 28 – Mar 6, 2011	(South Korea) 2011 World Junior Championships	5	66.96	4	126.96	5	193.92

== See also ==
- List of select Jewish figure skaters
