= Emmy Ma =

Taiwanese-American figure skater

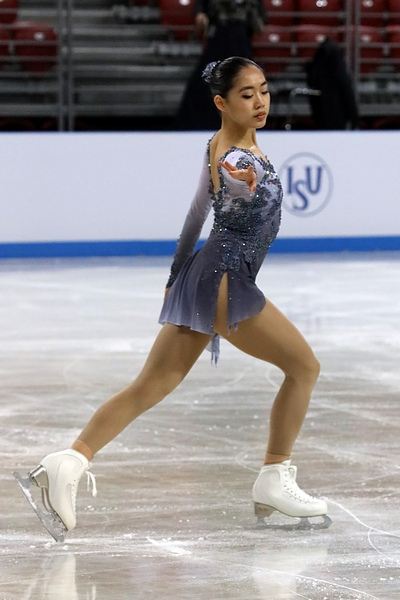
- Ma at the 2018 World Junior Championships

Personal information
- Born: January 19, 2001 (age 25) Manhasset, New York, U.S.
- Home town: Newton, Massachusetts, U.S.
- Height: 5 ft 4 in (1.62 m)

Figure skating career
- Country: Chinese Taipei (2019–2021); United States (until 2019)
- Coach: Peter Johansson; Mark Mitchell
- Skating club: Academy at Mitchell Johansson Method
- Began skating: 2007
- Retired: May 5, 2022

Emmy Ma (born January 19, 2001) is a Taiwanese-American former competitive figure skater. Representing Chinese Taipei, she is the 2021 International Challenge Cup silver medalist and 2019 Taiwanese national champion.

Earlier in her career, representing the United States, she won bronze at 2017 JGP Latvia and placed 19th at the 2018 World Junior Championships.

== Personal life ==
Emmy Ma was born on January 19, 2001, in Manhasset, New York. She has an older brother, Edward, and older sister, Emily. She plays violin for New England Conservatory's Youth Philharmonic Orchestra. As of 2019, Ma is a student at Boston University. She has spoken about dealing with an eating disorder, citing fellow skaters Gabrielle Daleman and Gracie Gold's openness about their own struggles as a reason to come forward.

== Career ==
Ma began learning to skate in 2007. She won a pewter medal in the junior ladies' event at the 2017 U.S. Championships.

=== For the United States ===
Ma won bronze at the ISU Junior Grand Prix in Latvia in September 2017. Making her senior international debut, she placed fifth at the 2017 CS Golden Spin of Zagreb in December. In March, she competed at the 2018 World Junior Championships in Sofia, Bulgaria. She qualified to the final segment and finished 19th overall.

Competing in the senior ranks, Ma placed 16th at the 2018 U.S. Championships and 9th at the 2019 U.S. Championships. She switched to represent Taiwan from the 2019–20 season.

=== For Taiwan ===
Ma won the 2019–20 Taiwanese national title, but did not compete internationally for Chinese Taipei. During the 2020–21 season, she did not travel to Taiwan for the 2020–21 Taiwanese Championships due to the COVID-19 pandemic. Ma was set to make her international debut for Taiwan at the 2020 CS Cup of Tyrol, but the event was cancelled due to the pandemic. She made her debut at the 2021 Challenge Cup where she won a silver medal. She placed second in the short and third in the free skate. This earned her her minimums for the 2021 World Championships, where she placed twenty-ninth.

== Programs ==
Season	Short program	Free skating
2020–2021	Mon cœur s'ouvre à ta voix (from Samson and Delilah) by Camille Saint-Saëns choreo. by Jamie Isley	Amazing Grace; My Chains Are Gone performed by Alison Jiear choreo. by Jamie Isley
2017–2018	One More Try by George Michael performed by Brenna Whitaker choreo. by Jamie Isley	The Phantom of the Opera by Andrew Lloyd Webber choreo. by Jamie Isley
2016–2017	Mon cœur s'ouvre à ta voix by Camille Saint-Saëns	The Phantom of the Opera by Andrew Lloyd Webber choreo. by Jamie Isley

== Competitive highlights ==
CS: Challenger Series; JGP: Junior Grand Prix

=== For Chinese Taipei ===
International
Event	19–20	20–21
Worlds		29th
CS Cup of Tyrol		C
Challenge Cup		2nd
National
Taiwanese Champ.	1st	
TBD = Assigned; C = Cancelled

=== For the United States ===
International
Event	16–17	17–18	18–19
CS Golden Spin		5th	
CS Finlandia Trophy			WD
International: Junior
Junior Worlds		19th	
JGP Latvia		3rd	
JGP Poland		5th	
Challenge Cup		1st	
National
U.S. Champ.	4th J	16th	9th
WD = Withdrew; Levels: V = Juvenile; I = Intermediate; N = Novice; J = Junior

== Detailed results ==
=== For Chinese Taipei ===
2020–2021 season
Date	Event	SP	FS	Total
March 22–28, 2021	2021 World Championships	29; 55.63	-	29; 55.63
February 25–28, 2021	2021 Challenge Cup	2; 65.25	3; 112.04	2; 177.29
2019–2020 season
Date	Event	SP	FS	Total
August 2–3, 2019	2019–20 Taiwanese Championships	1; 51.62	1; 103.42	1; 155.04

=== For the United States ===
2018–2019 season
Date	Event	Level	SP	FS	Total
January 19–27, 2019	2019 U.S. Championships	Senior	6; 65.13	9; 109.69	9; 174.82
2017–2018 season
Date	Event	Level	SP	FS	Total
March 5–11, 2018	2018 World Junior Championships	Junior	16; 52.78	19; 87.20	19; 139.98
Dec. 29, 2017 – Jan. 8, 2018	2018 U.S. Championships	Senior	18; 45.55	15; 92.47	16; 138.02
December 6–9, 2017	2017 CS Golden Spin of Zagreb	Senior	9; 49.63	2; 117.08	5; 166.71
October 4–7, 2017	2017 JGP Poland	Junior	6; 52.41	6; 103.45	5; 155.86
September 6–9, 2017	2017 JGP Latvia	Junior	3; 59.92	4; 112.70	3; 172.62
2016–2017 season
Date	Event	Level	SP	FS	Total
February 23–26, 2017	2017 Challenge Cup	Junior	1; 52.91	2; 95.82	1; 148.73
January 14–22, 2017	2017 U.S. Championships	Junior	1; 60.31	5; 89.57	4; 149.88
