= Elliana Pogrebinsky =

American ice dancer

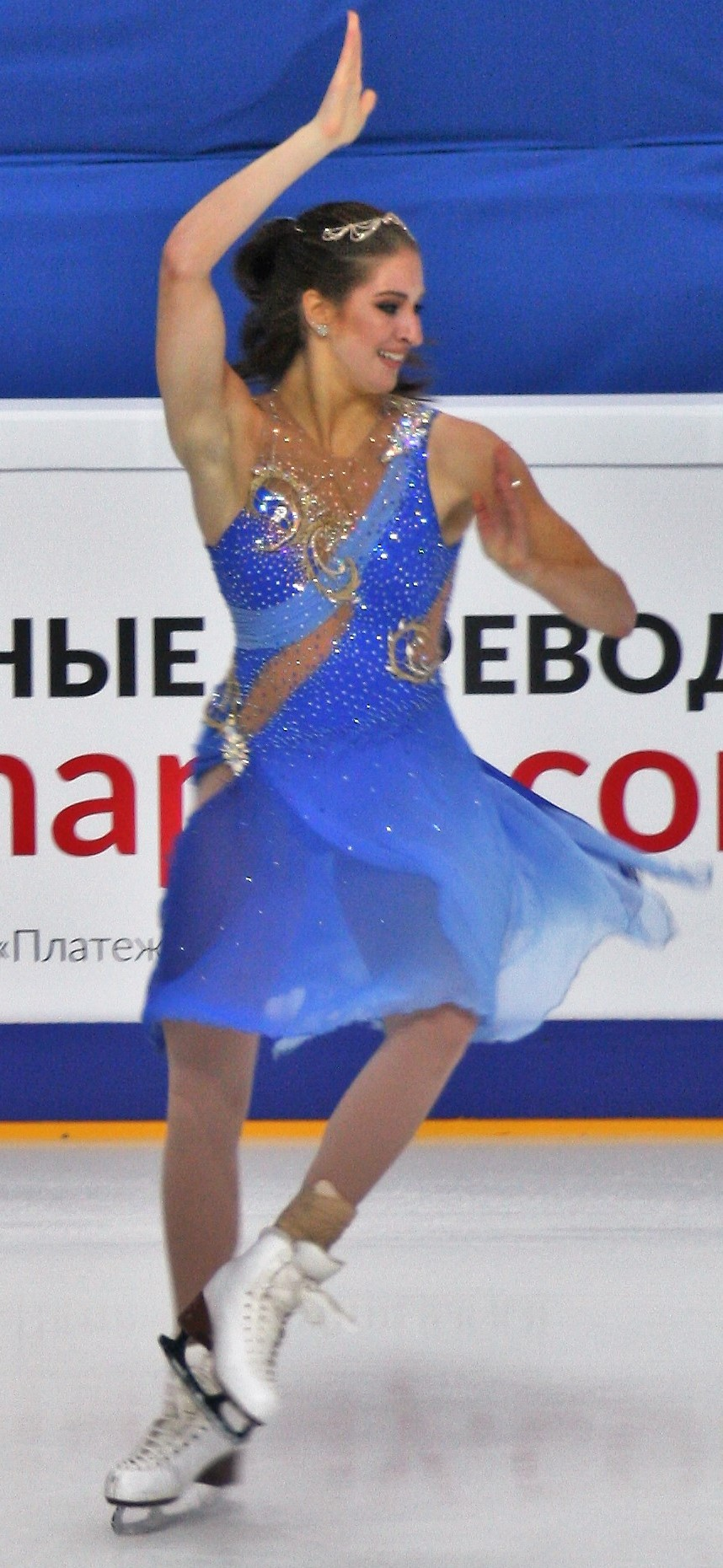
- Pogrebinsky at the 2016 Rostelecom Cup

Personal information
- Born: April 22, 1998 (age 28) Los Gatos, California, U.S.
- Height: 5 ft 8 in (1.73 m)

Figure skating career
- Country: United States
- Coach: Igor Shpilband, Adrienne Lenda, Greg Zuerlein, Fabian Bourzat
- Skating club: Peninsula FSC San Jose
- Began skating: 2000

Elliana Pogrebinsky (born April 22, 1998) is a retired American competitive ice dancer. With Alex Benoit, she is a two-time ISU Challenger Series Tallinn Trophy bronze medalist (2016, 2017), the 2016 Lake Placid Ice Dance International champion, and the 2017 U.S. national pewter medalist.

== Personal life ==
Elliana Pogrebinsky was born April 22, 1998, in Los Gatos, California. She is the daughter of Natalia and Vladimir Pogrebinsky, and has an elder brother, Daniel. Her parents moved to the United States in the late 1980s from Odesa, Ukraine. She is Jewish and celebrated her bat mitzvah in 2011.

As a child, Pogrebinsky studied at a ballet school in San Jose, California, and competed in ballroom dancing and in rhythmic gymnastics, winning a Pacific Region title and qualifying for three national championships at three levels. After moving from California to Maryland in 2009, she attended Westland Middle School and Bethesda-Chevy Chase High School. In 2016, she graduated from FlexTech Academy in Novi, Michigan. She is now enrolled at the University of San Francisco pursuing a bachelor's degree in Kinesiology and has an internship at the athletic department in Strength and Conditioning at USF.

== Career ==
=== Early years ===
Pogrebinsky began skating as a three-year-old in San Jose. From 2005 to 2009, she was coached by Marina Klimova and Sergei Ponomarenko in California.

Pogrebinsky teamed up with Ross Gudis in March 2009. They were coached by Alexei Kiliakov, Elena Novak, and Dmytri Ilin in Wheaton and Rockville, Maryland. Making their ISU Junior Grand Prix debut, they placed 6th in Lake Placid, New York, and 11th in Bled, Slovenia in 2012, before placing 5th in junior dance at the 2013 U.S. Championships. In the 2013–14 season, they competed at two more JGP events – finishing 4th in Riga, Latvia, and 6th in Gdańsk, Poland – and placed 5th for the second year in a row at the U.S. Championships.

=== Partnership with Benoit ===
Pogrebinsky teamed up with Alex Benoit in March 2014 after a tryout in Novi, Michigan, that was suggested by Igor Shpilband. Their international debut came at the 2014–15 ISU Junior Grand Prix (JGP) in Aichi; after placing fifth in Japan, Pogrebinsky/Benoit were sent to the JGP in Zagreb, Croatia, where they finished 8th. In January 2015, they won the junior bronze medal at the 2015 U.S. Championships and were selected to compete at the 2015 World Junior Championships in Tallinn. Ranked 12th in the short dance, they qualified for the free dance (14th) and finished 13th overall in Estonia.

During the 2015–16 ISU Junior Grand Prix series, Pogrebinsky/Benoit placed fourth in Linz, Austria, and won the bronze medal in Logroño, Spain. They repeated as junior national bronze medalists and were assigned to the 2016 World Junior Championships in Debrecen, Hungary; they placed fifth in the short dance, fourth in the free, and fourth overall.

Pogrebinsky/Benoit decided to compete on the senior level in the 2016–2017 season. Making their Grand Prix debut, they placed 7th at the 2016 Skate America and 6th at the 2016 Rostelecom Cup. They won bronze at the 2016 CS Tallinn Trophy and then the pewter medal (fourth place) at the 2017 U.S. Championships.

In their second senior season, the two finished 7th at both of their Grand Prix assignments and took bronze at the 2017 CS Tallinn Trophy before placing 7th at the 2018 U.S. Championships. Their coaches included Igor Shpilband, Adrienne Lenda, Greg Zuerlein, and Fabian Bourzat. In March 2018, Benoit announced his decision to retire from competitive skating while Pogrebinsky said that she would search for another partner.

== Programs ==
=== With Benoit ===
Season	Short dance	Free dance
2017–2018	Samba: Simba by Dan Nekonecny; Rhumba: Lo So Che Finirà by Anna Tatangelo; Merengue: Bailar by Deorro ft. Elvis Crespo	I Put a Spell on You performed by Annie Lennox; Original composition by Hugo Chouinard
2016–2017	Blues & swing: Trouble performed by Elvis Presley	Persian legend: Layla and Majnun: Sadko by Nikolai Rimsky-Korsakov; The Feeling Begins by Peter Gabriel
2015–2016	My Sweet and Tender Beast by Eugen Doga	Romeo + Juliet by Nellee Hooper, Craig Armstrong, Marius de Vries; Roméo et Juliette: de la Haine à l'Amour by Gérard Presgurvic; Romeo + Juliet by Hooper, Armstrong, deVries
2014–2015	Straight to Memphis by Club des Belugas; Beijos by DJ Vadim; Banto by Kaoma	Swan Lake by Pyotr Ilyich Tchaikovsky: Act I, Introduction; Act I, No. 5; Act II, No. 10; Act III, No. 24

=== With Gudis ===
Season	Short dance	Free dance
2013–2014	Foxtrot: Pink Panther by Henry Mancini; Quickstep: Jumping at the Woodside by Chacra Music	El Conquistador by Maxime Rodriguez; Para Mi Nicole by Esperanza; El Conquistador by Maxime Rodriguez
2012–2013	Hip Hop: Overpowered by Róisín Murphy; Blues: The Blues by Mr. De; Hip Hop: Cry Baby by Róisín Murphy	Masquerade by Aram Khachaturian: Mazurka; Romance; Waltz
2011–2012	Relax Max by Dina Washington; Party is Over by Peggy Lee	The Master and Margarita by Igor Kornelyuk
2010–2011		The Matrix Revolutions by Don Davis: Spirit of the Universe; Tetsujin
2009–2010		Mimes by Ennio Morricone

== Competitive highlights ==
GP: Grand Prix; CS: Challenger Series; JGP: Junior Grand Prix

=== With Benoit ===
International
Event	14–15	15–16	16–17	17–18
GP Cup of China				7th
GP France				7th
GP Rostelecom Cup			6th	
GP Skate America			7th	
CS Lombardia Trophy				4th
CS Nebelhorn Trophy			4th	
CS Tallinn Trophy			3rd	3rd
Lake Placid IDI			1st	3rd
International: Junior
World Junior Champ.	13th	4th		
JGP Austria		4th		
JGP Croatia	8th			
JGP Japan	5th			
JGP Spain		3rd		
National
U.S. Championships	3rd J	3rd J	4th	7th
J = Junior level TBD = Assigned; WD = Withdrew

=== With Gudis ===
International
Event	11–12	12–13	13–14
JGP Latvia			4th
JGP Poland			6th
JGP Slovenia		11th	
JGP United States		6th	
National
U.S. Championships	8th J	5th J	5th J
