= Alex Benoit =

American ice dancer (born 1995)

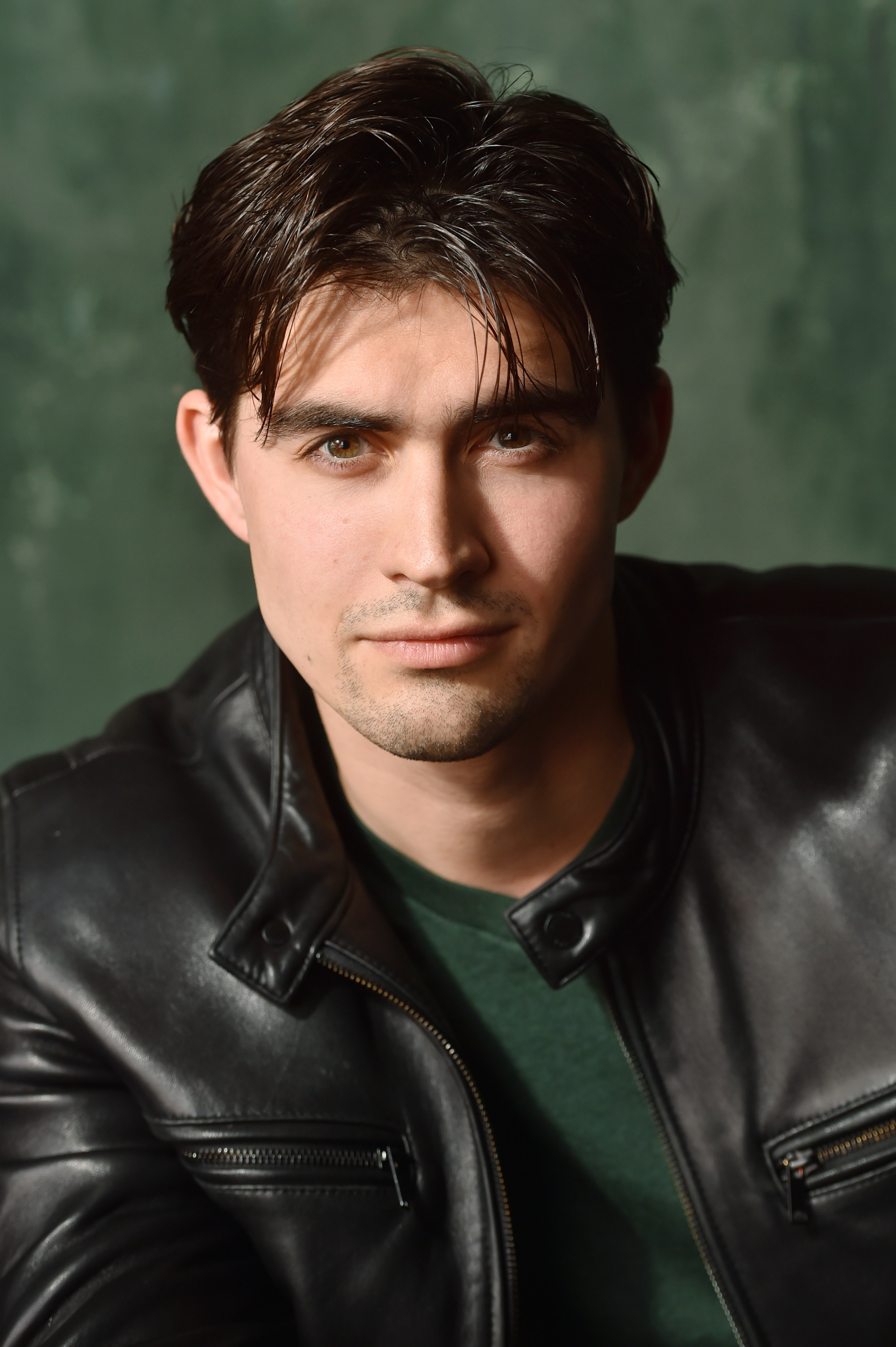
- Benoit in 2021

Personal information
- Born: October 9, 1995 (age 31) Winfield, Illinois, U.S.
- Height: 6 ft 2 in (1.88 m)

Figure skating career
- Country: United States
- Began skating: 2004
- Retired: March 20, 2018

Alexander Benoit (born October 9, 1995) is an American actor and former competitive ice dancer. With his skating partner, Elliana Pogrebinsky, he is a two-time ISU Challenger Series Tallinn Trophy bronze medalist (2016, 2017), the 2016 Lake Placid Ice Dance International champion, the 2017 U.S. national pewter medalist, and a two-time (2015–2016) U.S. junior national bronze medalist.

== Early life ==
Benoit was born on October 9, 1995, in Winfield, Illinois. He has French-Canadian and Ukrainian ancestry. His mother has served as a U.S. Figure Skating judge and ice dance controller. His father was a scholarship football player for Northwestern University. After finishing high school through distance education, he enrolled at Oakland University in Rochester Hills, Michigan, where he pursued a Bachelor of Fine Arts/Theatre degree.

== Early skating career ==
Benoit began skating in 2004. Competing as a single skater, he won the national juvenile bronze medal at the 2009 U.S. Junior Championships and was awarded the intermediate bronze medal the following season. Candice Brown coached him from 2004 to 2014.

Benoit decided to switch to ice dancing after being diagnosed with a congenital knee condition that was aggravated by his flip and lutz jumps. He teamed up with Olivia Di Iorio in late 2012. The two placed 11th in junior ice dancing at the 2014 U.S. Championships. They were coached by Candice Brown in Naperville, Illinois, and by Igor Shpilband in Novi, Michigan.

== Partnership with Pogrebinsky ==
Benoit teamed up with Elliana Pogrebinsky in March 2014 after a tryout in Novi, Michigan, that was suggested by Igor Shpilband. Their international debut came at the 2014–15 ISU Junior Grand Prix (JGP) in Aichi; after placing fifth in Japan, Pogrebinsky and Benoit were sent to the JGP in Zagreb, Croatia, where they finished 8th. In January 2015, they won the junior bronze medal at the 2015 U.S. Championships and were selected to compete at the 2015 World Junior Championships in Tallinn. Ranked 12th in the short dance, they qualified for the free dance (14th) and finished 13th overall in Estonia.

During the 2015–16 ISU Junior Grand Prix series, Pogrebinsky/Benoit placed fourth in Linz, Austria, and won the bronze medal in Logroño, Spain. They repeated as junior national bronze medalists and were assigned to the 2016 World Junior Championships in Debrecen, Hungary; they placed fifth in the short dance, fourth in the free, and fourth overall.

Pogrebinsky/Benoit decided to compete on the senior level in the 2016–17 season. Following autumn appearances at two ISU Grand Prix events and two ISU Challenger Series events, they won the senior pewter medal at the 2017 U.S. Championships in January 2017. They completed their season in the top 24 of the ISU World Ranking for ice dance. During this season, Pogrebinsky/Benoit debuted a new move, which they named the "Fountain Lift", in their Layla and Majnun-themed free dance. It consisted of Benoit skating on a deep outside spread eagle while Pogrebinsky performed an arched-back handstand on his knees.

During the 2017-18 season, they again competed at two ISU Grand Prix events, two Challenger Series events, and the 2018 U.S. Championships, capping off their season with another top 24 ISU World Ranking.

Benoit announced his retirement from competitive skating on March 20, 2018, to finish his college education and to pursue his acting career.

== Professional acting career ==
Benoit's first professional role was in Daddy Long Legs, in the title role of Jervis Pendleton, in 2018. The production was the Michigan premiere of the musical and was staged at The Dio Theatre in Pinckney, MI. His next role was in the musical Something in the Game, about football coach Knute Rockne. The musical was staged through the American Music Theatre Project, based at Northwestern University in Evanston, Illinois. Benoit was a member of the ensemble, as well as an understudy for George Gipp; the production ran in 2018.

In 2019, he appeared in Mamma Mia! at the Drury Lane Theatre in Oak Brook, Illinois. Benoit understudied the roles of Sky and Father Alexandrios, in addition to being an ensemble member. Remaining at Drury Lane through Mid-2019, he appeared in the regional premiere of Matilda the Musical in the role of Rudolpho, while also performing the role of the Escapologist. In late 2019 he appeared in Into the Woods at the Writers Theatre in Glencoe, IL, as Rapunzel's Prince. The production later received several Jeff Award nominations, including "Best Musical" and "Best Ensemble".

Represented by Stewart Talent Agency, he has also worked in commercials and voice-overs. He can be seen regularly on multiple nationally telecast WeatherTech commercials.

In 2019, Benoit announced his intention to pursue a Master of Arts in Classical Acting for the Professional Theatre at the London Academy of Music and Dramatic Art (LAMDA), graduating in 2020 with first class honours.

In January 2022, Benoit starred in the official music video of Jameson Rodgers' country hit, "Missing One".

In 2022, it was announced that he was cast in the Broadway-bound musical, The Notebook, premiering September 2022 at Chicago Shakespeare Theatre in Chicago.

== Personal life ==
Benoit also serves as a U.S. Figure Skating judge for singles, pairs, and ice dance. In 2020, Benoit announced his engagement to Canadian actress Jordan Grier, whom he met while studying at LAMDA. They were married in October 2021 in Chicago.

== Programs ==
=== With Pogrebinsky ===
Season	Short dance	Free dance
2017–2018	Samba: Simba by Dan Nekonecny; Rhumba: Lo So Che Finirà by Anna Tatangelo; Merengue: Bailar by Deorro ft. Elvis Crespo	I Put a Spell on You performed by Annie Lennox; Original composition by Hugo Chouinard
2016–2017	Blues & swing: Trouble performed by Elvis Presley	Persian legend: Layla and Majnun: Sadko by Nikolai Rimsky-Korsakov; The Feeling Begins by Peter Gabriel
2015–2016	My Sweet and Tender Beast by Eugen Doga	Romeo + Juliet by Nellee Hooper, Craig Armstrong, Marius de Vries; Roméo et Juliette: de la Haine à l'Amour by Gérard Presgurvic; Romeo + Juliet by Hooper, Armstrong, deVries
2014–2015	Straight to Memphis by Club des Belugas; Beijos by DJ Vadim; Banto by Kaoma	Swan Lake by Pyotr Ilyich Tchaikovsky: Act I, Introduction; Act I, No. 5; Act II, No. 10; Act III, No. 24

=== With Di Iorio ===
Season	Short dance	Free dance
2013–2014	Medley by Dean Martin	The Princess Bride; The Ancient Muse by Loreena McKennitt

== Competitive highlights ==
GP: Grand Prix; CS: Challenger Series; JGP: Junior Grand Prix

=== With Pogrebinsky ===
International
Event	14–15	15–16	16–17	17–18
GP Cup of China				7th
GP France				7th
GP Rostelecom Cup			6th	
GP Skate America			7th	
CS Lombardia Trophy				4th
CS Nebelhorn Trophy			4th	
CS Tallinn Trophy			3rd	3rd
Lake Placid IDI			1st	3rd
International: Junior
World Junior Champ.	13th	4th		
JGP Austria		4th		
JGP Croatia	8th			
JGP Japan	5th			
JGP Spain		3rd		
National
U.S. Championships	3rd J	3rd J	4th	7th
J = Junior level TBD = Assigned; WD = Withdrew

=== With Di Iorio ===
National
Event	2013–14
U.S. Championships	11th J
