= Legacy on Ice =

Ice show

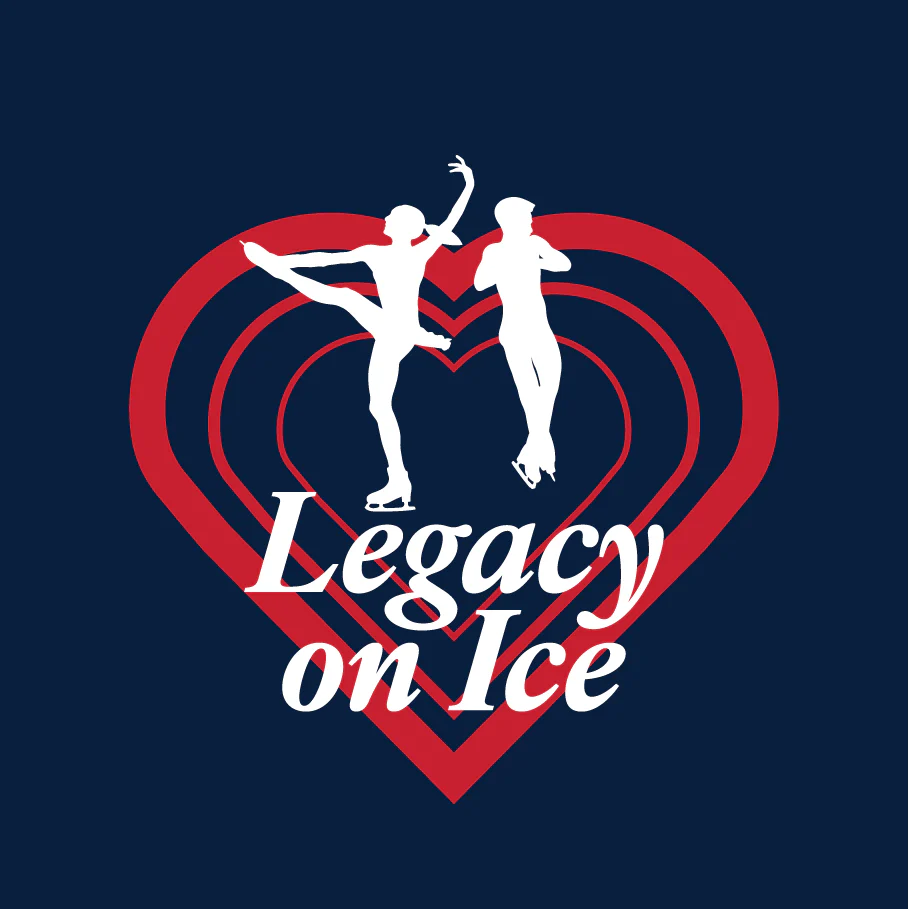
- Format: Figure skating; Live music
- Duration: 120 minutes
- Date: March 2, 2025
- No. of shows: 1
- Country: United States
- Broadcast: NBC; Peacock; YouTube; MNMT; Monumental+
- Producer: Entertainment Gang
- Organizer: Monumental Sports & Entertainment; U.S. Figure Skating; DC Fire & EMS Foundation; Greater Washington Community Foundation
- Sponsor: American Express; MGM National Harbor; DXC Technology; Venture Global
- Website: www.legacyonice.com

Legacy on Ice is a benefit ice show held in honor of the victims of the mid-air collision over the Potomac River in Washington, D.C., involving American Airlines Flight 5342 and a United States Army helicopter.

== Background ==
On January 29, 2025, American Airlines Flight 5342, a Bombardier CRJ-700 passenger plane en route from Wichita, Kansas, collided mid-air with a United States Army Sikorsky UH-60 Black Hawk helicopter as it came in to land at Ronald Reagan International Airport in Washington D.C. The jet and helicopter crashed into the Potomac River and killed all 67 people on board. Among the passengers were 28 members of the figure skating community which included young athletes, coaches and family members returning from a national development camp held in conjunction with the U.S. Figure Skating Championships in Wichita.

In early February 2025, a tribute event was announced, to take place in Capital One Arena in Washington D.C. on March 2, 2025. All proceeds will be distributed equally between the U.S. Figure Skating Family Support Fund, Greater Washington Community Foundation's "DCA Together Relief Fund," and DC Fire & EMS Foundation.

=== Supporters ===
The tribute was organized by Monumental Sports & Entertainment, U.S. Figure Skating, DC Fire & EMS Foundation and the Greater Washington Community Foundation and took place on March 2, 2025, at Capital One Arena in Washington D.C. It featured multiple generations of figure skating greats, members of DMV Skating Clubs and Skating Club of Boston, and all of Washington's professional sports teams: the NHL's Washington Capitals, the NBA's Washington Wizards, the WNBA's Washington Mystics, NBA G League's Capital City Go-Go, the MLB's Washington Nationals, the MLS' D.C. United, the NFL's Washington Commanders, and the NWSL's Washington Spirit.

== Attendance and accessibility ==
=== Ticket sales and proceeds ===
Capital One Arena has a capacity of 20,000, and tickets went on sale on February 10, 2025, starting from $30 with Ticketmaster waiving administration fees for the event. According to the organizers, more than 15,000 tickets were sold, and the tribute show raised more than $1.2 million for the victims and first responders.

=== Television broadcast and media coverage ===
The event aired live on Peacock, U.S. Figure Skating's YouTube channel, Monumental Sports Network (MNMT) and on the subscription platform Monumental+ on March 2, 2025. The show was also broadcast on NBC on March 30, 2025.

== Cast ==
The event was co-hosted by 1988 Olympic champion Brian Boitano and 1992 Olympic Champion Kristi Yamaguchi. The Legacy on Ice cast members included:

- Jeremy Abbott, 2014 Olympic Team Bronze Medalist
- Sofia Bezkorovainaya, 2024-25 Team USA
- Brian Boitano, 1988 Olympic Champion
- Emily Bratti and Ian Somerville, 2024 U.S. Bronze Medalists
- Jason Brown, 2014 Olympic Team Bronze Medalist
- Ashley Cain, Two-time U.S. Pairs National Champion
- Christina Carreira and Anthony Ponomarenko, Two-time Four Continents Ice Dance Bronze Medalists
- Kitty and Peter Carruthers, 1984 Olympic Pairs Silver Medalists
- Molly Cesanek and Yehor Yehorov, 2020 U.S. Junior Pewter Medalists
- Nathan Chen, 2022 Two-time Olympic Gold Medalist
- Madison Chock and Evan Bates, 2022 Olympic Team Gold Medalists
- Richard Dwyer, U.S. Figure Skating Hall of Famer
- Alisa Efimova and Misha Mitrofanov, 2025 U.S. Pairs Champions
- Sarah Everhardt, 2025 Four Continents Bronze Medalist
- Peggy Fleming, 1968 Olympic Champion
- Amber Glenn, 2024 Grand Prix Final Champion
- Gracie Gold, 2014 Olympic Team Bronze Medalist
- Scott Hamilton, 1984 Olympic Champion
- Nancy Kerrigan, 1994 Olympic Silver Medalist
- Ilia Kulik, 1998 Olympic Champion
- Isabeau Levito, 2024 World Silver Medalist
- Alysa Liu, 2022 World Bronze Medalist
- Jimmy Ma, 2025 Four Continents Bronze Medalist
- Ilia Malinin, 2024 World Champion
- Katie McBeath and Daniil Parkman, 2025 U.S. Pairs Silver Medalists
- Yebin Mok, 1998-2008 Team USA
- Maxim Naumov, 2025 U.S. Pewter Medalist
- Camden Pulkinen, Two-time U.S. Bronze Medalist
- Andrew Torgashev, 2025 U.S. Silver Medalist
- Michael Weiss, Two-time World Bronze Medalist
- Johnny Weir, Three-time U.S. Champion
- Paul Wylie, 1992 Olympic Silver Medalist
