= Greater Washington Community Foundation =

Non-profit organization in the Washington D.C. area

The Greater Washington Community Foundation (formerly known as The Community Foundation for the National Capital Region) is a public charity and the largest local community foundation serving the Washington, DC metropolitan area, including DC, Montgomery County, Prince George's County, and Northern Virginia.

Founded in 1973, The Community Foundation manages charitable giving funds and invests in local nonprofits and communities through partnerships with individuals, families, businesses, and government entities. Since its founding, the organization and its partners have distributed more than $1.8 billion in grants."About the Community Foundation". Greater Washington Community Foundation. In fiscal year 2025, the organization distributed more than $130 million in grants to nonprofits, including donor-directed grants and competitive grants awarded through its own initiatives.

The Community Foundation is accredited by the Council on Foundations and holds a four-star Charity Navigator rating and a Candid Gold Seal of Transparency. It is led by President & CEO Tonia Wellons and governed by a volunteer Board of Trustees.

== Mission ==
The stated mission of the Greater Washington Community Foundation is to manage and mobilize philanthropic resources to address economic equity and community needs in the Greater Washington region.

== History ==
In 1973, a group of business and civic leaders including Peggy Cooper Cafritz, Maceo W. Hubbard, Peggy Shackleton, Hank Strong, and Bishop John T. Walker established the Community Foundation for Greater Washington (now known as the Greater Washington Community Foundation) to create a permanent source of philanthropic capital for the Washington Metropolitan region."History". GWCF 50th Anniversary.

Initial funding was provided by the Hattie M. Strong Foundation, Eugene and Agnes E. Meyer Foundation, Morris and Gwendolyn Cafritz Foundation, and the Cummins Engine Foundation. The organization grew and began issuing grants to local nonprofit organizations in 1979.

Over the next five decades, the organization expanded its donor network and governance to include regional figures such as: Katherine Graham, Stewart Bainum Sr, Eleanor Holmes Norton, R. Robert Linowes, Don Beyer, Carol Thompson Cole, Vicki Sant, Charito Kruvant, Alex Orfinger, Artis Hampshire-Cowan, Alexine Clement Jackson, Daniel K. Mayers, David M. Bradt, Jr, Clarice Dibble Walker, Neal Simon, Katherine Weymouth, and others.

In the late 1990s, The Community Foundation established regional offices in Montgomery County (1996)Rudney, Sally (2006-07-06). "Spirit of Giving Is Alive and Welcome Here in the County". The Washington Post. ISSN 0190-8286. and Prince George’s County (1998)Eppard, James (2001-05-17). "Philanthropists Turn to Community Foundations". The Washington Post. ISSN 0190-8286..

In 2021, the organization launched a 10-year strategic framework focused on four goals: pursuing economic mobility, addressing critical community needs, connecting philanthropy to impact, and strengthening neighborhoods and community institutions."Our Strategic Vision". Greater Washington Community Foundation.

== Initiatives ==
=== Responding to 9/11 ===
Following the 9/11 attack on the Pentagon, The Community Foundation established the Survivor’s FundFreeman, Terri Lee (2011-09-10). "Opinion | Helping survivors of the 9/11 attack on the Pentagon". The Washington Post. ISSN 0190-8286., which raised $25 million to provide services, financial aid, and support to victims and their families."Remembering 9/11". Greater Washington Community Foundation.

The fund partnered with Northern Virginia Family Services over the subsequent seven years to provide mental health services and financial aid to over 1,000 affected individuals.Patel, Heena (2021-09-10). "Twenty years after 9/11: Prioritizing trauma-informed mental health care". Northern Virginia Family Services.

=== Homelessness Services ===
Beginning in 1985, The Community Foundation initiated investments to serve individuals experiencing homelessness in Washington, DC. The organization launched Healthcare for the Homeless, a program that operated health stations in shelters and mobile outreach units. It also partnered with the Fannie Mae Foundation to distribute $70 million from its Help the Homeless Fund and Walkathon.Sullivan, Patricia (2011-08-23). "Homeless walkathon on Mall to end in November". The Washington Post. ISSN 0190-8286.

In 2019, in partnership with the DC Interagency Council on Homelessness, The Community Foundation established The Partnership to End Homelessness"Partnership to End Homelessness". Greater Washington Community Foundation. 2026-04-15. to bring together local government, service providers, advocates, and businesses to address affordable housing and support services.

As of 2026, the initiative has funded or preserved nearly 1,000 housing units for low-income residents, advocated for permanent supportive housing vouchers for nearly 5,000 households, and allocated approximately $20 million in funding toward affordable housing and local grants.

=== Arts Support ===
In 2001, The Community Foundation established the Washington Creative Communities Initiative to develop support infrastructure for regional artists. Over seven years, the initiative allocated $800,000 to independent artists and nonprofit creative projects.

In 2020, in partnership with the Morris and Gwendolyn Cafritz Foundation, it launched the Arts Forward Fund"Greater Washington Community Foundation and Cafritz Foundation Launch $1 million Arts Forward Fund". Greater Washington Community Foundation., which distributed more than $2.7 million to over 100 arts and cultural organizations during the COVID-19 pandemic.

=== Workforce Development ===
In 2008, The Community Foundation convened the Greater Washington Workforce Development Collaborative (later renamed Reimagine), a coalition of foundations, corporations, and public agencies. The collaborative raised more than $12 million for workforce programs across 30 organizations, assisted 6,000 workers with employment placement, and leveraged more than $50 million in state and federal workforce funding."Reimagine (formerly Greater Washington Workforce Development Collaborative) Sunsets After 17 Years of Impact". Greater Washington Community Foundation.

The foundation also led the 1998 launch of the Washington Area Partnership for Immigrants, a coalition addressing day labor issues, educational involvement, legal services, and organizational capacity for immigrant-focused nonprofits.Sheridan, Mary Beth (2003-06-12). "D.C. Region's Immigrants Faring Better Than Others". The Washington Post. ISSN 0190-8286.

=== Emergency and Safety Net Funding ===
During the Great Recession of 2008, The Community Foundation raised $5 million through the Neighbors in Need Fund"Support Greater Washington Community Foundation on Mightycause". Mightycause. to fund food, shelter, clothing, foreclosure prevention, and healthcare programs. Between 2008 and 2013, the fund supported advocacy efforts related to local government safety net funding.

=== Public Safety and Violence Prevention ===
In coordination with the DC government, The Community Foundation administered The City Fund, a $15 million allocation for regional public safety initiatives. From 2013 to 2018, the fund supported organizations in areas affected by disparities related to social determinants of health"The Impact of the City Fund's Investments in DC". Greater Washington Community Foundation.."2014 EF0 One City Fund | ocfo". cfo.dc.gov.

Following the closure of the City Fund, the foundation continued funding violence intervention efforts. Between 2021 and 2026, the organization directed nearly $10 million toward youth engagement and community violence intervention initiatives, working alongside the Office of the DC Attorney General and the DC Office of Neighborhood Safety & Engagement."Healing from Within: Why DC Must Bolster Community-Led Solutions to Gun Violence". Greater Washington Community Foundation.

=== Children and Family Programs ===
In 2016, The Freddie Mac Foundation selected the organization to manage a five-year, $13.5 million grantmaking strategy focused on permanent housing solutions, educational resources, and foster care programs.

=== COVID-19 Emergency Response Fund ===
The foundation launched the COVID-19 Emergency Response Fund in March 2020."COVID-19 Emergency Response Fund". Greater Washington Community Foundation. The fund distributed $11.5 million to 300 local nonprofits providing food, shelter, medical care, and legal aid."Our Impact". Greater Washington Community Foundation.

The foundation additionally administered $80 million in emergency relief funds for small businesses, arts organizations, and excluded workers in partnership with local businesses and governments."Our Partners". Greater Washington Community Foundation. This included Food for Montgomery, a $2.6 million public-private partnership with the Montgomery County government and the Food Council to expand regional food distribution networks."Planting Seeds for Prosperity: Sharing Montgomery Explores Strategies to Advance Food Security for All". Greater Washington Community Foundation.

=== Small Business Support ===
In 2020, the foundation partnered with FSC First to provide $1 million in relief grants through the Prince George’s County Legacy Fund for Small Business Development, supporting 173 small businesses. In 2024, it partnered with the PNC Foundation to distribute over $500,000 to businesses along the Purple and Blue Line transit corridors."Greater Washington Community Foundation Awards $500,000+ to Support Prince George's County Small Businesses". Greater Washington Community Foundation.

=== DCA Together Relief Fund ===
Following the 2025 Potomac River mid-air collision on January 29, 2025, The Community Foundation collaborated with community foundations in Northern Virginia to establish the DCA Together Relief Fund.Albert • •, Jessica (2025-02-27). "Relief fund for families, first responders in Potomac crash tops $125K". NBC4 Washington.

The fund collected and distributed nearly $800,000, which included $45,000 for first responders and mental health providers, and over $750,000 in financial assistance for victims' families."DCA Together Relief Fund". Greater Washington Community Foundation. Corporate contributions included support from Monumental Sports & Entertainment, which hosted the "Legacy on Ice" benefit event.Frisby, Jenna (2025-02-05). ""Legacy on Ice" Benefit at Capital One Arena to Support Victims of the Tragedy at Ronald Reagan Washington National Airport - Monumental Sports". monumentalsports.com.

=== Economic Mobility Initiatives ===
The foundation has financed several guaranteed income pilot programs within the region, including Let’s GO DMV (DC), Arlington’s Guarantee (Northern Virginia), and MoCo Boost (Montgomery County)."Guaranteed Income". Greater Washington Community Foundation. 2025-03-20.

In 2024, it launched Thrive Prince George’s, a $4 million pilot program providing monthly disbursements of $800 for 24 months to 50 former foster youth and 125 senior residents.Beachum, Lateshia (2023-11-21). "Prince George's County launches two-year basic-income pilot program". The Washington Post. ISSN 0190-8286.

The same year, it initiated Brilliant Futures, a savings program managing up to $1,000 annually for up to 400 students from kindergarten through 12th grade for future educational or business investments."Brilliant Futures". Greater Washington Community Foundation. 2025-09-16.

=== Health Equity Fund ===
In 2022, the Executive Office of the Mayor of DC and CareFirst BlueCross BlueShield appointed The Community Foundation to manage the Health Equity Fund, a $95 million endowment intended to address public health outcomes and economic mobility in underinvested communities within Washington, DC.Sánchez, Vanessa G. (2022-06-16). "New D.C. fund takes $95 million aim at systemic health disparities". The Washington Post. ISSN 0190-8286.

The fund focuses on community infrastructure, policy advocacy, and economic programs addressing the structural determinants of health."Health Equity Fund". Greater Washington Community Foundation. 2026-04-14. As of 2026, the fund has issued 155 grants totaling over $90 million.

=== VoicesDMV ===
In 2017, the foundation established VoicesDMV, a regional survey and community research initiative."VoicesDMV". Greater Washington Community Foundation. Conducted every three years in collaboration with Gallup, Inc., the resulting VoicesDMV Community Insights Report compiles data on regional living conditions, economic challenges, and public sentiment regarding community needs.
