= 2007 Cup of China =

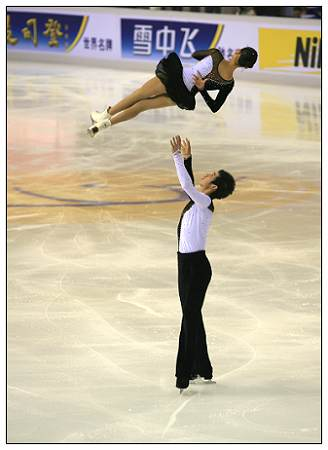
- Type: Grand Prix
- Date: November 7 – 11
- Season: 2007–08
- Location: Harbin
- Host: Chinese Skating Association
- Venue: International Sports Center

Champions
- Men's singles: (United States) Johnny Weir
- Ladies' singles: (South Korea) Kim Yuna
- Pairs: (China) Pang Qing / Tong Jian
- Ice dance: (United States) Tanith Belbin / Benjamin Agosto
- Previous: 2006 Cup of China
- Next: 2008 Cup of China
- Previous Grand Prix: 2007 Skate Canada
- Next Grand Prix: 2007 Trophée Éric Bompard

The 2007 Cup of China was the third event of six in the 2007–08 ISU Grand Prix of Figure Skating, a senior-level international invitational competition series. It was held at the International Sports Center in Harbin on November 7–11. Medals were awarded in the disciplines of men's singles, ladies' singles, pair skating, and ice dancing. Skaters earned points toward qualifying for the 2007–08 Grand Prix Final.

== Results ==
=== Men ===
Rank	Name	Nation	Total points	SP		FS	
1	Johnny Weir	United States	231.78	2	79.80	1	151.98
2	Evan Lysacek	United States	229.36	1	81.55	2	147.81
3	Stéphane Lambiel	Switzerland	192.22	3	70.20	3	122.02
4	Sergei Davydov	Belarus	181.75	4	68.69	8	113.06
5	Alexander Uspenski	Russia	179.94	6	60.90	4	119.04
6	Karel Zelenka	Italy	171.03	8	57.19	7	113.84
7	Shawn Sawyer	Canada	170.94	5	63.41	10	107.53
8	Jamal Othman	Switzerland	170.27	9	55.74	5	114.53
9	Wu Jialiang	China	168.95	7	58.38	9	110.57
10	Xu Ming	China	167.51	11	53.36	6	114.15
11	Li Chengjiang	China	159.52	10	53.50	11	106.02
12	Ryo Shibata	Japan	134.19	12	48.70	12	85.49

=== Ladies ===
Rank	Name	Nation	Total points	SP		FS	
1	Kim Yuna	South Korea	180.68	3	58.32	1	122.36
2	Caroline Zhang	United States	156.34	2	58.76	2	97.58
3	Carolina Kostner	Italy	143.86	1	60.82	4	83.04
4	Fumie Suguri	Japan	137.13	11	44.76	3	92.37
5	Júlia Sebestyén	Hungary	136.60	4	55.46	5	81.14
6	Beatrisa Liang	United States	127.42	7	46.44	6	80.98
7	Fang Dan	China	124.58	8	45.88	7	78.70
8	Susanna Pöykiö	Finland	124.00	6	48.48	9	75.52
9	Alissa Czisny	United States	120.43	5	51.08	11	69.35
10	Xu Binshu	China	119.63	9	45.74	10	73.89
11	Arina Martinova	Russia	117.38	12	40.54	8	76.84
12	Wang Yueren	China	109.71	10	45.48	12	64.23

=== Pairs ===
Jessica Miller / Ian Moram attempted a throw quadruple salchow jump in their free skating. They were credited with the rotation, but it was not landed successfully.

Rank	Name	Nation	Total points	SP		FS	
1	Pang Qing / Tong Jian	China	176.75	1	65.48	1	111.27
2	Keauna McLaughlin / Rockne Brubaker	United States	154.66	2	59.22	2	95.44
3	Jessica Miller / Ian Moram	Canada	137.30	3	50.46	3	86.84
4	Zhang Yue / Wang Lei	China	126.78	4	48.32	5	78.46
5	Li Jiaqi / Xu Jiankun	China	125.08	5	46.24	4	78.84
6	Maria Sergejeva / Ilja Glebov	Estonia	113.68	7	36.40	6	77.28
7	Dominika Piątkowska / Dmitri Khromin	Poland	102.27	6	38.84	7	63.43
WD	Mari Vartmann / Florian Just	Germany					

=== Ice dancing ===
Rank	Name	Nation	Total points	CD		OD		FD	
1	Tanith Belbin / Benjamin Agosto	United States	195.11	2	35.89	2	60.81	1	98.41
2	Oksana Domnina / Maxim Shabalin	Russia	188.66	1	38.77	1	62.20	3	87.69
3	Federica Faiella / Massimo Scali	Italy	181.10	3	33.54	3	56.94	2	90.62
4	Alexandra Zaretski / Roman Zaretski	Israel	161.86	4	30.81	4	52.26	4	78.79
5	Sinead Kerr / John Kerr	United Kingdom	152.99	5	29.52	5	48.93	6	74.54
6	Anna Zadorozhniuk / Sergei Verbillo	Ukraine	150.18	7	27.04	6	47.51	5	75.63
7	Huang Xintong / Zheng Xun	China	139.09	6	27.05	8	41.01	7	71.03
8	Zoé Blanc / Pierre-Loup Bouquet	France	132.96	8	24.79	7	43.36	8	64.81
9	Guo Jiameimei / Meng Fei	China	112.69	10	19.59	10	35.07	9	58.03
10	Liu Lu / Suo Bin	China	108.78	9	20.25	9	35.14	10	53.39
