= 2007 Trophée Éric Bompard =

- Type: Grand Prix
- Date: November 15 – 18
- Season: 2007–08
- Location: Paris
- Venue: Palais omnisports de Paris-Bercy

Champions
- Men's singles: (Canada) Patrick Chan
- Ladies' singles: (Japan) Mao Asada
- Pairs: (China) Zhang Dan / Zhang Hao
- Ice dance: (France) Isabelle Delobel / Olivier Schoenfelder
- Previous: 2006 Trophée Éric Bompard
- Next: 2008 Trophée Éric Bompard
- Previous Grand Prix: 2007 Cup of China
- Next Grand Prix: 2007 Cup of Russia

The 2007 Trophée Éric Bompard was the fourth event of six in the 2007–08 ISU Grand Prix of Figure Skating, a senior-level international invitational competition series. It was held at the Palais Omnisports de Paris-Bercy in Paris on November 15–18. Medals were awarded in men's singles, ladies' singles, pair skating, and ice dancing. Skaters earned points toward qualifying for the 2007–08 Grand Prix Final. The compulsory dance was the Austrian Waltz.

The competition was named after the Éric Bompard company, which became its chief sponsor in 2004.

== Results ==
=== Men ===
Rank	Name	Nation	Total points	SP		FS	
1	Patrick Chan	Canada	214.94	2	70.89	1	144.05
2	Sergei Voronov	Russia	208.91	4	68.70	2	140.21
3	Alban Préaubert	France	207.10	1	72.70	3	134.40
4	Kevin van der Perren	Belgium	204.75	3	70.60	4	134.15
5	Ryan Bradley	United States	191.32	7	59.13	5	132.19
6	Tomáš Verner	Czech Republic	189.37	8	57.23	6	132.14
7	Kensuke Nakaniwa	Japan	177.61	5	62.70	7	114.91
8	Christopher Mabee	Canada	175.17	6	61.68	8	113.49
9	Scott Smith	United States	151.25	9	56.36	11	94.89
10	Jérémie Colot	France	149.47	11	49.39	9	100.08
11	Gao Song	China	146.19	10	50.55	10	95.64

=== Ladies ===
Rank	Name	Nation	Total points	SP		FS	
1	Mao Asada	Japan	179.80	1	56.90	1	122.90
2	Kimmie Meissner	United States	158.74	2	55.98	3	102.76
3	Ashley Wagner	United States	158.63	5	50.48	2	108.15
4	Sarah Meier	Switzerland	147.15	4	53.98	5	93.17
5	Mira Leung	Canada	144.57	7	43.78	4	100.79
6	Jelena Glebova	Estonia	141.71	3	55.24	7	86.47
7	Viktória Pavuk	Hungary	137.73	6	44.56	6	93.17
8	Gwendoline Didier	France	120.14	10	36.82	8	83.32
9	Valentina Marchei	Italy	118.99	8	43.18	9	75.81
10	Fang Dan	China	111.65	9	40.12	10	71.53
11	Aki Sawada	Japan	99.18	12	29.94	11	69.24
12	Anastasia Gimazetdinova	Uzbekistan	98.90	11	35.42	12	63.48

=== Pairs ===
Jessica Miller / Ian Moram and Tiffany Vise / Derek Trent were both credited with throw quadruple salchow jumps in the free skating. Vise / Trent's was ratified as the first quadruple salchow jump performed in international competition.

Rank	Name	Nation	Total points	SP		FS	
1	Zhang Dan / Zhang Hao	China	196.96	1	71.60	1	125.36
2	Pang Qing / Tong Jian	China	186.93	2	64.32	2	122.61
3	Maria Mukhortova / Maxim Trankov	Russia	169.82	3	61.76	4	108.06
4	Tiffany Vise / Derek Trent	United States	165.76	4	56.06	3	109.70
5	Tatiana Volosozhar / Stanislav Morozov	Ukraine	152.59	5	54.18	6	98.41
6	Jessica Miller / Ian Moram	Canada	142.92	7	44.26	5	98.66
7	Adeline Canac / Maximin Coia	France	122.47	6	47.02	8	75.45
8	Stacey Kemp / David King	United Kingdom	114.25	8	36.68	7	77.57

=== Ice dancing ===
Rank	Name	Nation	Total points	CD		OD		FD	
1	Isabelle Delobel / Olivier Schoenfelder	France	194.14	1	39.51	1	60.10	2	94.53
2	Jana Khokhlova / Sergei Novitski	Russia	191.01	2	34.89	2	58.15	1	97.97
3	Meryl Davis / Charlie White	United States	176.21	4	31.74	3	55.25	3	89.22
4	Anna Cappellini / Luca Lanotte	Italy	168.75	3	31.86	5	49.11	4	87.78
5	Pernelle Carron / Mathieu Jost	France	159.26	5	31.74	6	47.63	5	81.71
6	Anastasia Grebenkina / Vazgen Azrojan	Armenia	156.18	6	27.94	4	49.86	7	78.38
7	Kaitlyn Weaver / Andrew Poje	Canada	154.20	7	27.47	7	46.99	6	79.74
8	Barbora Silná / Dmitri Matsjuk	Austria	139.56	8	24.79	8	44.11	8	70.66
9	Yu Xiaoyang / Wang Chen	China	135.63	9	22.95	9	42.99	9	69.69
10	Zoé Blanc / Pierre-Loup Bouquet	France	126.10	10	21.77	10	38.59	10	65.74
