= David Wilson (figure skating) =

Canadian former figure skater

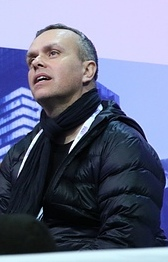

Personal information
- Full name: David Wilson
- Born: May 25, 1966 (age 60)

Figure skating career
- Country: Canada

David Wilson (born May 25, 1966) is a Canadian former figure skater who currently works as a choreographer at the Toronto Cricket and Skating Club.

As a skater, his competitive career was cut short when he was diagnosed with Osgood-Schlatter disease. Following surgery on his knee, then 18-year-old Wilson toured with Ice Capades in North America.

With his then-partner, Jean-Pierre Boulais, Wilson settled in Montreal and began working as a choreographer. Their breakout client was Sébastien Britten.

Later, Wilson moved to Toronto and worked with many notable skaters including World and Olympic champions and medalists.

== Choreographing career ==
His current and former clients include:

- (United States) Jeremy Abbott
- (Japan) Miki Ando
- (Canada) David Bondar
- (United States) Jordan Brauninger
- (Canada) Sébastien Britten
- (United States) Lucas Broussard
- (Canada) Jeffrey Buttle
- (South Korea) Cha Jun-hwan
- (Canada) Patrick Chan
- (United States) Sasha Cohen
- (United States) Alissa Czisny
- (Canada) Gabrielle Daleman
- (France) Frédéric Dambier
- (United States) Caydee Denney & Jeremy Barrett
- (South Africa) Michaela Du Toit
- (Canada) Jessica Dubé & Bryce Davison
- (Canada) Marie-France Dubreuil & Patrice Lauzon
- (Canada) Sara-Maude Dupuis
- (Spain) Javier Fernández
- (Canada) Ben Ferreira
- (United States) Christina Gao
- (China) Geng Bingwa
- (United States) Alexe Gilles
- (Japan) Yuzuru Hanyu
- (Canada) Lesley Hawker
- (Japan) Marin Honda
- (United States) Emily Hughes
- (Spain) Sara Hurtado & Adrià Díaz
- (Canada) Lubov Iliushechkina & Dylan Moscovitch
- (Japan) Midori Ito
- (China) Jin Boyang
- (France) Brian Joubert
- (Canada) Ava Kemp & Yohnatan Elizarov
- (Japan) Rika Kihira
- (South Korea) Kim Min-chae
- (South Korea) Kim Ye-lim
- (South Korea) Yuna Kim
- (Finland) Kiira Korpi
- (Japan) Takahiko Kozuka
- (South Korea) Kwak Min-jeong
- (Canada) Amélie Lacoste
- (Canada) Anabelle Langlois & Cody Hay
- (Canada) Jacinthe Larivière & Lenny Faustino
- (Canada) Kelly Ann Laurin & Loucas Éthier
- (China) Li Zijun
- (China) Liu Yan
- (Canada) Grayson Long
- (Canada) Christopher Mabee
- (Japan) Rino Matsuike
- (Canada) Brooke McIntosh & Benjamin Mimar
- (Russia) Evgenia Medvedeva
- (United States) Kimmie Meissner
- (Japan) Mai Mihara
- (Canada) Jessica Miller & Ian Moram
- (Mexico) Andrea Montesinos Cantú
- (Japan) Daisuke Murakami
- (Japan) Ami Nakai
- (Japan) Kensuke Nakaniwa
- (Japan) Yukari Nakano
- (Sweden) Andreas Nordebäck
- (Canada) Nam Nguyen
- (Japan) Nobunari Oda
- (Japan) Yoshie Onda
- (Canada) Brian Orser
- (Switzerland) Alexia Paganini
- (China) Pang Qing & Tong Jian
- (Canada) Anthony Paradis
- (China) Peng Cheng & Jin Yang
- (South Korea) Park So-youn
- (Canada) Cynthia Phaneuf
- (United States) Camden Pulkinen
- (Switzerland) Kimmy Repond
- (United States) Adam Rippon
- (Canada) Joannie Rochette
- (Canada) Kaiya Ruiter
- (Canada) Roman Sadovsky
- (Japan) Kaori Sakamoto
- (United States) Emmanuel Savary
- (Germany) Aliona Savchenko & Robin Szolkowy
- (Canada) Shawn Sawyer
- (Israel) Netta Schreiber
- (Estonia) Aleksandr Selevko
- (Canada) Hetty Shi
- (South Korea) Shin Ji-a
- (Japan) Fumie Suguri
- (China) Sui Wenjing & Cong Han
- (Japan) Daisuke Takahashi
- (Kazakhstan) Denis Ten
- (Canada) Jeremy Ten
- (United States) Lindsay Thorngren
- (Chinese Taipei) Tsai Yu-Feng
- (Russia) Elizaveta Tuktamysheva
- (Japan) Shoma Uno
- (Canada) Tessa Virtue & Scott Moir
- (United States) Ashley Wagner
- (China) Wang Xuehan & Wang Lei
- (China) Wang Yihan
- (United States) Johnny Weir
- (Canada) Lauren Wilson
- (Japan) Sōta Yamamoto
- (Canada) Nicholas Young
- (China) Yu Xiaoyu & Jin Yang
- (United States) Agnes Zawadzki
- (United States) Caroline Zhang
- (China) Zhang He
- (China) Zhang Kexin
