= 2007 Skate America =

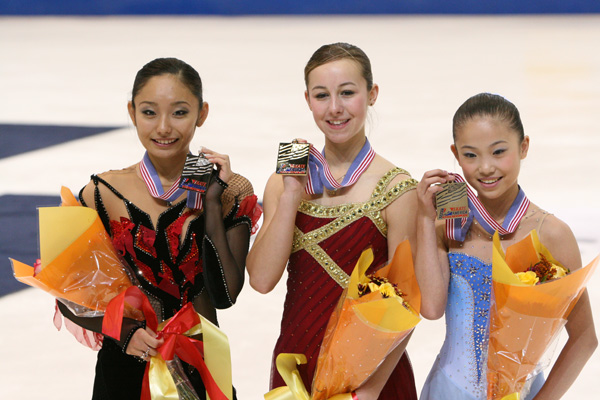
- Type: Grand Prix
- Date: October 25 – 28
- Season: 2007–08
- Location: Reading, Pennsylvania
- Host: U.S. Figure Skating
- Venue: Sovereign Center

Champions
- Men's singles: (Japan) Daisuke Takahashi
- Ladies' singles: (United States) Kimmie Meissner
- Pairs: (Canada) Jessica Dubé / Bryce Davison
- Ice dance: (United States) Tanith Belbin / Benjamin Agosto
- Previous: 2006 Skate America
- Next: 2008 Skate America
- Next Grand Prix: 2007 Skate Canada International

The 2007 Skate America was the first event of six in the 2007–08 ISU Grand Prix of Figure Skating, a senior-level international invitational competition series. It was held at the Sovereign Center in Reading, Pennsylvania on October 25–28. Medals were awarded in the disciplines of men's singles, ladies' singles, pair skating, and ice dancing. Skaters earned points toward qualifying for the 2007–08 Grand Prix Final. The compulsory dance was the Austrian Waltz.

== Schedule ==
- Friday, Oct. 26
  - 6:00 p.m. - Compulsory dance
  - 7:35 p.m. - Pairs' short program
  - 9:10 p.m. - Men's short program
- Saturday, Oct. 27
  - 2:00 p.m. - Original dance
  - 3:45 p.m. - Pairs' free skating
  - 6:00 p.m. - Ladies' short program
  - 7:55 p.m. - Men's free skating
- Sunday, Oct. 28
  - 2:00 p.m. - Free dance
  - 4:08 p.m. - Ladies' free skating
  - 7:30 p.m. - Exhibition of Champions

== Results ==
=== Men ===
| Rank | Name | Nation | Total points | SP | | FS | |
|---|---|---|---|---|---|---|---|
| 1 | Daisuke Takahashi | Japan | 228.97 | 1 | 80.04 | 2 | 148.93 |
| 2 | Evan Lysacek | United States | 220.08 | 2 | 67.70 | 1 | 152.38 |
| 3 | Patrick Chan | Canada | 213.33 | 3 | 67.47 | 3 | 145.86 |
| 4 | Stephen Carriere | United States | 196.33 | 6 | 66.85 | 4 | 129.48 |
| 5 | Alban Préaubert | France | 194.40 | 4 | 67.05 | 5 | 127.35 |
| 6 | Ryan Bradley | United States | 181.66 | 8 | 58.69 | 6 | 122.97 |
| 7 | Andrei Lutai | Russia | 180.88 | 5 | 66.91 | 8 | 113.97 |
| 8 | Takahiko Kozuka | Japan | 177.47 | 10 | 56.25 | 7 | 121.22 |
| 9 | Kevin Reynolds | Canada | 169.12 | 7 | 59.25 | 9 | 109.87 |
| 10 | Yasuharu Nanri | Japan | 153.99 | 9 | 57.84 | 12 | 96.15 |
| 11 | Kristoffer Berntsson | Sweden | 152.52 | 11 | 54.15 | 10 | 98.37 |
| 12 | Karel Zelenka | Italy | 144.51 | 12 | 46.14 | 11 | 98.37 |

Referee: Beth Crane

Technical Controller: Igor Prokop

Technical Specialist: Vladimir Petrenko

Assistant Technical Specialist: David Santee

Judge No.1: Karen Butcher (Canada)

Judge No.2: Raffaella Locatelli (Italy)

Judge No.3: Anne G. Shean (United States)

Judge No.4: Igor Obraztsov (Russia)

Judge No.5: Kerstin Kimminus (Germany)

Judge No.6: Salome Chigogidze (Georgia (country))

Judge No.7: Leena Kurri (Finland)

Judge No.8: Mona Jonsson (Sweden)

Judge No.9: Masako Kubota (Japan)

Judge No.10: Valerie Greugny (France)

Data Operator: Marylin Kreuzinger

Replay Operator: David Kirby

=== Ladies ===
| Rank | Name | Nation | Total points | SP | | FS | |
|---|---|---|---|---|---|---|---|
| 1 | Kimmie Meissner | United States | 163.23 | 1 | 59.24 | 2 | 103.99 |
| 2 | Miki Ando | Japan | 161.89 | 2 | 56.58 | 1 | 105.31 |
| 3 | Caroline Zhang | United States | 153.35 | 3 | 56.48 | 3 | 96.87 |
| 4 | Emily Hughes | United States | 140.50 | 4 | 47.66 | 5 | 92.84 |
| 5 | Mira Leung | Canada | 139.14 | 6 | 46.04 | 4 | 93.10 |
| 6 | Elene Gedevanishvili | Georgia | 126.06 | 11 | 38.30 | 6 | 87.76 |
| 7 | Alexandra Ievleva | Russia | 124.84 | 8 | 44.78 | 7 | 80.06 |
| 8 | Mai Asada | Japan | 120.49 | 5 | 47.66 | 9 | 73.67 |
| 9 | Tuğba Karademir | Turkey | 119.26 | 10 | 41.58 | 8 | 77.68 |
| 10 | Valentina Marchei | Italy | 116.44 | 9 | 44.64 | 10 | 71.80 |
| 11 | Xu Binshu | China | 112.46 | 7 | 45.16 | 11 | 67.30 |

Referee: Hely Abbondati

Technical Controller: Steve Winkler

Technical Specialist: Jayson Peace

Assistant Technical Specialist: Vladimir Petrenko

Judge No.1: Karen Howard (Canada)

Judge No.2: Elena Buriak (Russia)

Judge No.3: Salome Chigogidze (Georgia (country))

Judge No.4: Wei Shi (China)

Judge No.5: Mayumi Kato (Japan)

Judge No.6: Mona Jonsson (Sweden)

Judge No.7: Raffaella Locatelli (Italy)

Judge No.8: William S. Smith (United States)

Judge No.9: Karen Jones (United Kingdom)

Judge No.10: Leena Kurri (Finland)

Data Operator: Marylin Kreuzinger

Replay Operator: David Santee

=== Pairs ===
| Rank | Name | Nation | Total points | SP | | FS | |
|---|---|---|---|---|---|---|---|
| 1 | Jessica Dubé / Bryce Davison | Canada | 173.26 | 1 | 60.80 | 1 | 112.46 |
| 2 | Pang Qing / Tong Jian | China | 165.19 | 2 | 60.32 | 2 | 104.87 |
| 3 | Vera Bazarova / Yuri Larionov | Russia | 159.58 | 3 | 56.76 | 3 | 102.82 |
| 4 | Amanda Evora / Mark Ladwig | United States | 140.40 | 4 | 46.18 | 4 | 94.22 |
| 5 | Meeran Trombley / Laureano Ibarra | United States | 132.42 | 5 | 45.48 | 5 | 86.94 |
| 6 | Laura Magitteri / Ondřej Hotárek | Italy | 114.66 | 7 | 38.76 | 6 | 75.90 |
| 7 | Stacey Kemp / David King | United Kingdom | 109.27 | 6 | 44.74 | 7 | 64.53 |

=== Ice dancing ===
| Rank | Name | Nation | Total points | CD | | OD | | FD | |
|---|---|---|---|---|---|---|---|---|---|
| 1 | Tanith Belbin / Benjamin Agosto | United States | 192.95 | 1 | 36.03 | 1 | 59.24 | 1 | 97.68 |
| 2 | Nathalie Péchalat / Fabian Bourzat | France | 181.84 | 2 | 34.56 | 2 | 56.95 | 2 | 90.33 |
| 3 | Federica Faiella / Massimo Scali | Italy | 172.28 | 3 | 31.43 | 3 | 54.56 | 3 | 86.29 |
| 4 | Meryl Davis / Charlie White | United States | 168.79 | 5 | 30.16 | 4 | 52.84 | 4 | 85.79 |
| 5 | Kristin Fraser / Igor Lukanin | Azerbaijan | 167.80 | 4 | 31.19 | 5 | 51.23 | 5 | 85.38 |
| 6 | Kimberly Navarro / Brent Bommentre | United States | 159.93 | 6 | 27.90 | 6 | 51.13 | 6 | 80.90 |
| 7 | Alexandra Zaretski / Roman Zaretski | Israel | 157.85 | 7 | 27.80 | 7 | 51.12 | 8 | 78.93 |
| 8 | Ekaterina Rubleva / Ivan Shefer | Russia | 151.58 | 8 | 26.95 | 8 | 45.46 | 7 | 79.17 |
| 9 | Cathy Reed / Chris Reed | Japan | 142.63 | 9 | 26.47 | 9 | 43.79 | 9 | 72.37 |
| 10 | Yu Xiaoyang / Wang Chen | China | 135.29 | 10 | 22.14 | 10 | 43.19 | 10 | 69.96 |
