= Nam Nguyen =

Canadian figure skater (born 1998)

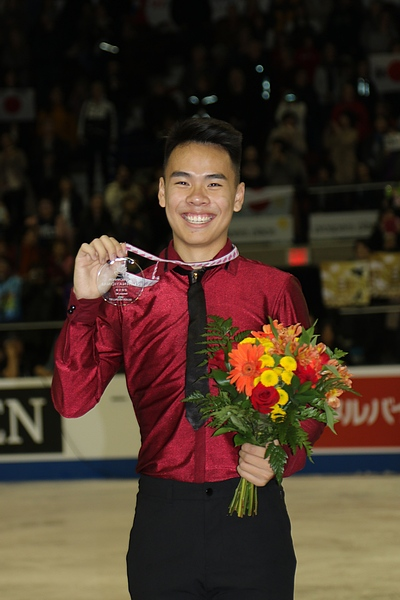
- Nguyen at 2019 Skate Canada International

Personal information
- Full name: Nam Phuc Nguyen
- Born: May 20, 1998 (age 28) Ottawa, Ontario, Canada
- Home town: Ajax, Ontario, Canada
- Height: 1.80 m (5 ft 11 in)

Figure skating career
- Country: Canada
- Coach: Robert Burke, Danielle Rose
- Skating club: Richmond Hill Training Centre
- Began skating: 2003
- Retired: May 20, 2022
Medal record
Representing Canada
Figure skating: Men's singles
World Junior Championships
Gold medal – first place	2014 Sofia	Men's singles

Nam Nguyen (born May 20, 1998) is a Canadian retired competitive figure skater. He is the 2014 World Junior champion, 2019 Skate Canada silver medallist, and two-time Canadian national champion (2015, 2019). He has placed as high as fifth at the World Championships, in 2015.

== Personal life ==
Nam Nguyen was born May 20, 1998, in Ottawa. Both of his parents are from Vietnam — his father, Sony, moved to Canada in 1988 and sponsored his wife, Thu, in 1994. His father is an engineer and his mother works for a medical software company. His sister, Kim, is six years younger and is also a figure skater. He lived in Richmond, British Columbia, and Burnaby, B.C. from 1999 to 2012, and then moved to Toronto, Ontario, so that he and his sister could train under Brian Orser.

Nguyen studied health sciences at York University.

He briefly dated American women's singles skater, Gracie Gold.

== Career ==
Nguyen began skating in 2003. Growing up, his figure skating idols were Evgeni Plushenko, Stephane Lambiel, and Jeffrey Buttle. Nguyen also cited his former training mates, Yuzuru Hanyu and Javier Fernandez, as being his inspirations.

=== Early career ===
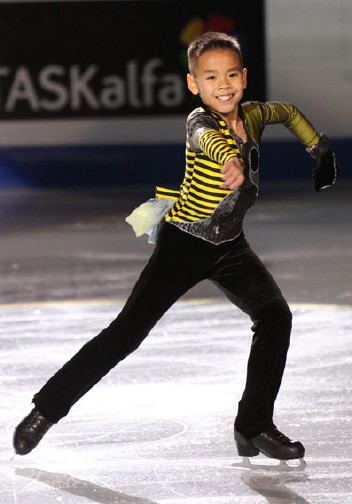
Nguyen during the gala at the 2009 Four Continents Championships

From 2007 to 2009, Nguyen won three Canadian national men's titles — Juvenile, Pre-Novice, and Novice — each time becoming the youngest skater to do so. In 2010, he won the bronze medal on the junior level at the Canadian Championships. Nguyen performed in the exhibition gala at the 2010 Winter Olympics in Vancouver, British Columbia. The following year at the 2011 Canadian Championships, he became the youngest skater to win the junior men's title.

=== 2011–2012 season ===
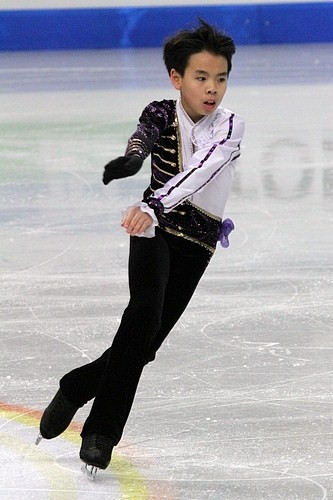
Nguyen at the 2012 World Junior Championships

In the 2011–2012 season, Nguyen became age-eligible for international junior competition. He finished twelfth in his first Junior Grand Prix (JGP) event in Riga, Latvia and then won the bronze medal in his second event in Brasov, Romania. He placed seventh on the senior level at the 2012 Canadian Championships and was assigned to the 2012 World Junior Championships. Nguyen landed his first triple axel in competition in the preliminary round and qualified for the short program with a first-place finish. He was eighteenth in the short program and eleventh in the free skating, finishing thirteenth overall at the event. Joanne McLeod coached him at the BC Centre of Excellence in Burnaby, British Columbia, until the end of the season.

=== 2012–2013 season ===
In the summer of 2012, Nguyen moved to Toronto to work with Brian Orser at the Toronto Cricket, Skating and Curling Club. He started the season at the JGP in France where he finished ninth. He did better at his second JGP event, in Turkey, earning the bronze medal. At the Canadian Championships, he placed sixth in the senior division. He finished the season at the World Junior Championships in Milan, Italy, where he placed twelfth.

=== 2013–2014 season ===
The next season, he placed fourth and 16th at his two JGP events. Competing at the senior level, he placed fifth at the Canadian Championships. He then competed at his first senior international, the Four Continents Championships, and placed tenth. Afterwards, at the World Junior Championships in Sofia, Bulgaria, he placed first in both segments and won the gold medal. He finished the season at the senior World Championships, where he placed twelfth.

=== 2014–2015 season ===
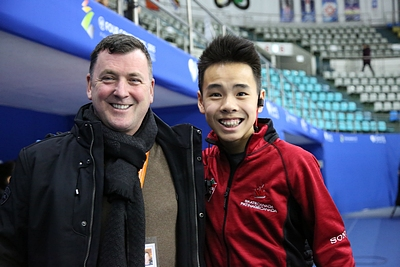
Nguyen with Brian Orser at the 2012 World Junior Championships

Nguyen started the season with a silver medal at the inaugural Skate Canada Autumn Classic, an ISU Challenger Series event. He made his senior Grand Prix debut at the Skate America, winning the bronze medal. He continued to his second Grand Prix event, the Cup of China, where he placed fourth. This placed him ninth in the final Grand Prix standings, making him third alternate for the final. In December, he won the gold medal at the Skate Canada Challenge, the qualifying event for Canadian Nationals. In January, he won his first senior national title, outscoring the silver medallist by more than 30 points. After placing eleventh at the 2015 Four Continents, he finished fifth at the 2015 World Championships in Shanghai, recording his personal best scores in both segments.

=== 2015–2016 season ===
Nguyen started his season by winning silver at the 2015 Skate Canada Autumn Classic. Turning to the Grand Prix series, he placed fifth at the 2015 Skate Canada International and seventh at 2015 Rostelecom Cup.

Nguyen finished fourth at the 2016 Canadian Nationals. He was assigned to the 2016 World Championships in Boston after Liam Firus withdrew. He failed to qualify to the free skating. In an interview at the 2016 Team Challenge Cup, he mentioned his planned coaching change to David Glynn. Skate Canada confirmed the change a few days later, stating that Nguyen would move to San Jose in May.

=== 2016–2017 season ===
Nguyen placed fifth at the 2016 CS U.S. International Classic. On the Grand Prix series, he placed sixth at the 2016 Skate America and eighth at the 2016 NHK Trophy.

After returning to Ontario in December 2016, he began training at the York Region Skating Academy, coached by Tracey Wainman and Grzegorz Filipowski. He won the bronze medal at the 2017 Canadian Championships and placed 8th at the 2017 Four Continents Championships. Nguyen switched coaches again following continued disappointing results, working instead with Robert Burke in Richmond Hill.

=== 2017–2018 season ===
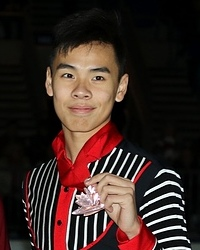
Nguyen at the 2018 Canadian Championships

Nguyen placed fifth at the 2017 CS Autumn Classic and seventh at the 2017 Rostelecom Cup. At the 2017 NHK Trophy in Osaka, Japan, Nam placed tenth overall after disappointing eleventh place in short program. Later in Montreal, Nguyen took the bronze medal at the 2018 Skate Canada Challenge.

Nguyen placed third at the 2018 Canadian Championships, behind Patrick Chan and Keegan Messing, and thus was not picked for the Canadian delegation to the 2018 Winter Olympics. He instead joined Messing on the Canadian team at the 2018 World Championships, where he had a poor showing in the short program and failed to qualify for the free skating.

=== 2018–2019 season ===
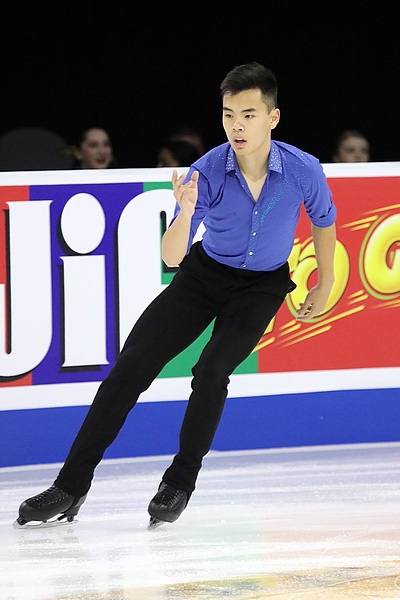
Nguyen at the 2018 Skate America

Nguyen opened the new season at the 2018 U.S. Classic, where he placed first in the short program and second in the free skate to win the gold medal, his first international gold at the senior level. He was assigned to two ISU Grand Prix events, Skate America, where he placed sixth, and Skate Canada, where he placed fifth.

In January 2019, Nguyen competed at the 2019 Canadian Championships. He placed third in the short program after doubling the second part of his combination. He then won the free skate, and the overall title, the second of his career. He was subsequently named to the Canadian teams for the Four Continents and World Championships.

At the 2019 World Championships, Nguyen placed sixteenth after two error-riddled programs. The placements of Nguyen and Messing meant that Canada would have only one men's berth at the 2020 World Championships. Nguyen concluded the season at the 2019 World Team Trophy, where he placed seventh overall among the twelve men.

=== 2019–2020 season ===
Nguyen placed fourth at the 2019 Nebelhorn Trophy, finishing ninth in the short program after making severe errors on all his jumping passes and second in the free program after only one fall.

Beginning the Grand Prix at the 2019 Skate Canada International, Nguyen was third in the short program behind Yuzuru Hanyu and Camden Pulkinen with a mostly clean skate, but for a minor error on his triple flip. Nguyen performed last in the free skate, immediately after a near-world record performance by Hanyu. He skated with only one minor error, singling a planned double toe loop, and set new personal bests in both the free skate and total score to take the silver medal, his first Grand Prix medal in five years. Nguyen was fifth at his second assignment, the 2019 Rostelecom Cup, his only major error being popping one of his planned quad Salchow jumps in the free skate.

Nguyen set out to defend his national title at the 2020 Canadian Championships, placing second in the short program behind Messing. Nguyen fell on both of his quad Salchow attempts in the free skate, and remained in second place overall, behind Roman Sadovsky. Skate Canada declined to determine who would take the sole men's berth at the World Championships in Montreal, and assigned the entire men's podium to compete at the 2020 Four Continents Championships in Seoul. Nguyen placed sixth at Four Continents, the highest placement among the Canadian men there, with his only error across two programs being a singled attempt at a triple Axel in the free skate.

Due to his strong performance at Four Continents, Nguyen was chosen to represent Canada at the World Championships, but these were cancelled as a result of the coronavirus pandemic.

=== 2020–2021 season ===
Nguyen was assigned to compete at the 2020 Skate Canada International, but the event was cancelled as a result of the pandemic.

With the pandemic continuing to make it difficult to hold in-person events, Skate Canada held the 2021 Skate Canada Challenge virtually. Nguyen won the silver medal, finishing 5.58 points behind Roman Sadovsky. Nguyen was named as an alternate to the 2021 World Championships, the lone men's berth going to Keegan Messing. With Canada's mandatory two-week quarantine for returning athletes, however, no member of the World team was assigned to the 2021 World Team Trophy, and Nguyen was assigned as one of Canada's two men's entries, alongside Sadovsky. On April 8, he was named as team captain. Nguyen placed eleventh of eleven skaters in both segments of the competition, while Team Canada finished in sixth place.

=== 2021–2022 season ===
Nguyen was initially assigned to compete at the 2021 CS Autumn Classic International, but withdrew shortly before the competition. He subsequently made his competitive debut at the 2021 Skate America, where he placed eighth. He was tenth at his second Grand Prix, the 2021 NHK Trophy. He landed a quad Salchow in the free skate, and said afterward that his overall score was "a reflection of how I've been focusing on my training. I recently just got my quad a few weeks ago and I’ve been neglecting the connection between the elements."

Nguyen contracted COVID-19 the week before the 2022 Canadian Championships, the last event prior to the selection of the Canadian Olympic team. He was off the ice for five days, returning to the ice four days before the short program. He struggled at the competition, finishing in sixth place, and was not named to the team. Nguyen had earlier said he anticipated this being his final season, but after the championships said that he "wanted to finish on a really high note, however, I did say earlier this season that this could be my last season. However, I was in a different mindset back then and a lot has happened from then to now, so I am not quite sure yet what my future holds." Nguyen subsequently announced on May 20 that he would be retiring as he had originally planned. He said that "after nationals, I was very, very determined to do another season, and we were already in the kind of like planning mode. And then give or take a few weeks, maybe a couple of months, my feeling shifted a lot."

=== Post-competitive career ===
Interviewed in September 2022, Nguyen stated, "[Watching figure skating] just pushed me away further because I remembered how awful I felt during my warm-up and how nervous I felt, and sitting there in front of the TV, I'm like, 'I'm so glad I'm not doing this anymore.'" Having no desire to work as a figure skating coach, he decided to coach ice hockey players in power skating.

In 2025, he joined the cast of Canadian Stars on Ice.

== Programs ==
Season	Short program	Free skating	Exhibition
2021–2022	That's Life by Frank Sinatra choreo. by Tracey Robertson; White Legend by Ikuko Kawai choreo. by Danielle Rose	Come Together; Get Back; Let It Be by The Beatles choreo. by Danielle Rose, Kurt Browning; Mi Mancherai by Josh Groban choreo. by Danielle Rose	
2020–2021	Adiós Nonino by Astor Piazzolla choreo. by Danielle Rose; Blues for Klook by Eddy Louiss choreo. by Mary Angela Larmer	Mi Mancherai by Josh Groban feat. Joshua Bell choreo. by Danielle Rose	
2019–2020	Blues for Klook by Eddy Louiss choreo. by Mary Angela Larmer	Come Together; Get Back; Let It Be by The Beatles choreo. by Danielle Rose, Kurt Browning	
2018–2019	That's Life by Frank Sinatra choreo. by Tracey Robertson	La La Land by Justin Hurwitz choreo. by Tracey Robertson, Kurt Browning	Runaway Baby by Bruno Mars; Give Our Hearts Some Weight by Joel Ansett
2017–2018	Over the Rainbow by Joseph William Morgan	An American in Paris by George Gershwin choreo. by David Wilson; La Strada by Nino Rota choreo. by David Wilson	
2016–2017	Love Me or Leave Me by Walter Donaldson, Gus Kahn covered by Sammy Davis Jr. choreo. by David Wilson	An American in Paris by George Gershwin choreo. by David Wilson	Writing's on the Wall (from James Bond - Spectre) by Sam Smith
2015–2016	Sinner Man by Nina Simone choreo. by Jeffrey Buttle; The Killing Fields: Pran's Theme; Pran's Departure; The Trek; The Boy's Burial / Pran Sees the Red Cross by Mike Oldfield choreo. by David Wilson	Passacaglia and Fugue in C minor by Johann Sebastian Bach choreo. by Jeffrey Buttle	My Funny Valentine by Frank Sinatra
2014–2015	Sinner Man by Nina Simone choreo. by Jeffrey Buttle	La Strada by Nino Rota choreo. by David Wilson	My Funny Valentine by Frank Sinatra; Does Anybody Really Know What Time It Is? (from Chicago) by Robert Lamm
2013–2014	Unsquare Dance (from Walking on Eggshells) by Dave Brubeck performed by Paddy Milner choreo. by Jeffrey Buttle	Air on the G String; Fantasia and Fugue in C Minor by Johann Sebastian Bach choreo. by David Wilson	Does Anybody Really Know What Time It Is? (from Chicago) by Robert Lamm; Smile performed by Michael Jackson; Don't Stop 'Til You Get Enough by Michael Jackson
2012–2013	The Ritz, Roll and Rock; Red Blues by Cole Porter choreo. by Jeffrey Buttle	Air on the G String; Fantasia and Fugue in C Minor by Johann Sebastian Bach choreo. by David Wilson	
2011–2012	Smooth Criminal by Michael Jackson performed by David Garrett	Concerto for Piano and Orchestra No. 1; Piano Concerto No. 5 "Emperor" by Ludwig van Beethoven choreo. by Joanne McLeod	Smile performed by Michael Jackson; Don't Stop 'Til You Get Enough by Michael Jackson
2010–2011	Smooth Criminal by Michael Jackson performed by David Garrett	Piano Concerto No. 4 in G major by Ludwig van Beethoven	
2009–2010		Kung Fu Panda by Hans Zimmer and John Powell	Fever by John Davenport
2008–2009		La Cumparsita by Gerardo Matos Rodríguez	Bee Movie by Rupert Gregson-Williams

== Competitive highlights ==
- GP: Grand Prix; CS: Challenger Series; JGP: Junior Grand Prix

=== 2011–12 to present ===
International
Event	11–12	12–13	13–14	14–15	15–16	16–17	17–18	18–19	19–20	20–21	21–22
Worlds			12th	5th	27th		25th	16th	C		
Four Continents			10th	11th		8th	9th	10th	6th		
GP Cup of China				4th							
GP NHK Trophy						8th	10th				10th
GP Rostelecom Cup					7th		7th		5th		
GP Skate America				3rd		6th		6th			8th
GP Skate Canada					5th			5th	2nd	C	
CS Autumn Classic				2nd			5th				WD
CS Nebelhorn Trophy									4th		
CS U.S. Classic						5th		1st			
Autumn Classic					2nd						
International: Junior
Junior Worlds	13th	12th	1st								
JGP France		9th									
JGP Latvia	12th										
JGP Mexico			4th								
JGP Poland			16th								
JGP Romania	3rd										
JGP Turkey		3rd									
National
Canadian Champ.	7th	6th	5th	1st	4th	3rd	3rd	1st	2nd	C	6th
Skate Canada Challenge				1st			3rd	1st		2nd	6th
Team events
World Team; Trophy				4th T 6th P				5th T 7th P		6th T 11th P	
Team Challenge; Cup					1st T 9th P						

=== 2006–07 to 2010–11 ===
National
Event	09–10	10–11
Canadian Champ.	3rd J	1st J

== Detailed results ==
Small medals for short program and free skating awarded only at ISU Championships.

=== Senior ===
2021–22 season
Date	Event	SP	FS	Total
January 6–12, 2022	2022 Canadian Championships	7; 71.27	8; 130.77	6; 202.04
November 12–14, 2021	2021 NHK Trophy	10; 64.28	10; 144.11	10; 208.39
October 22–24, 2021	2021 Skate America	7; 74.32	9; 145.28	8; 219.60
2020–21 season
Date	Event	SP	FS	Total
April 15–18, 2021	2021 World Team Trophy	11; 66.89	11; 133.04	6T/11P; 199.93
January 8–17, 2021	2021 Skate Canada Challenge	2; 89.34	2; 167.09	2; 256.43
2019–20 season
Date	Event	SP	FS	Total
February 4–9, 2020	2020 Four Continents Championships	9; 85.24	6; 166.36	6; 251.60
January 13–19, 2020	2020 Canadian Championships	2; 88.04	2; 155.47	2; 243.51
November 15–17, 2019	2019 Rostelecom Cup	6; 87.01	6; 159.19	5; 246.20
October 25–26, 2019	2019 Skate Canada International	3; 84.08	2; 178.69	2; 262.77
September 25–28, 2019	2019 CS Nebelhorn Trophy	9; 60.52	2; 149.32	4; 209.84
2018–19 season
Date	Event	SP	FS	Total
April 11–14, 2019	2019 World Team Trophy	7; 87.57	7; 164.40	5T/7P; 251.97
March 18–24, 2019	2019 World Championships	13; 82.51	16; 154.76	16; 237.27
February 7–10, 2019	2019 Four Continents Championships	8; 79.55	10; 136.94	10; 216.49
January 14–20, 2019	2019 Canadian Championships	3; 85.73	1; 172.28	1; 258.01
October 26–28, 2018	2018 Skate Canada International	7; 82.22	5; 158.72	5; 240.94
October 19–21, 2018	2018 Skate America	9; 69.86	6; 143.13	6; 212.99
September 12–16, 2018	2018 CS U.S. International Classic	1; 80.28	2; 133.24	1; 213.52
2017–18 season
Date	Event	SP	FS	Total
March 19–25, 2018	2018 World Championships	25; 67.79	FNR	–
January 22–28, 2018	2018 Four Continents Championships	7; 84.09	10; 153.43	9; 237.52
January 8–14, 2018	2018 Canadian Championships	5; 83.39	2; 174.77	3; 258.16
November 10–12, 2017	2017 NHK Trophy	11; 65.82	8; 148.69	10; 214.51
October 20–22, 2017	2017 Rostelecom Cup	7; 80.74	6; 157.71	7; 238.45
September 20–23, 2017	2017 CS Autumn Classic International	3; 88.40	4; 156.81	5; 245.21
2016–17 season
Date	Competition	SP	FS	Total
February 14–19, 2017	2017 Four Continents Championships	13; 72.99	7; 164.09	8; 237.08
January 16–22, 2017	2017 Canadian Championships	4; 76.08	4; 164.52	3; 240.60
November 25–27, 2016	2016 NHK Trophy	6; 75.33	8; 137.10	8; 212.43
October 21–23, 2016	2016 Skate America	4; 79.62	7; 159.64	6; 239.26
September 14–18, 2016	2016 CS U.S. International Classic	5; 74.08	5; 146.47	5; 220.55
2015–16 season
Date	Competition	SP	FS	Total
April 22–24, 2016	2016 Team Challenge Cup	7; 64.91	9; 127.10	–
March 28 – April 3, 2016	2016 World Championships	27; 61.61	FNR	–
January 18–24, 2016	2016 Canadian Championships	5; 76.04	4; 151.65	4; 227.69
November 20–22, 2015	2015 Rostelecom Cup	7; 70.78	6; 160.89	7; 231.67
Oct. 30 – Nov. 1, 2015	2015 Skate Canada International	4; 76.10	4; 162.72	5; 238.82
October 12–15, 2015	2015 Skate Canada Autumn Classic	2; 86.53	2; 154.57	2; 241.10
2014–15 season
Date	Competition	SP	FS	Total
April 16–19, 2015	2015 World Team Trophy	6; 77.42	7; 158.63	4T/6P; 236.05
March 23–29, 2015	2015 World Championships	9; 77.73	4; 164.86	5; 242.59
February 9–15, 2015	2015 Four Continents Championships	14; 63.78	8; 145.55	11; 209.33
January 19–25, 2015	2015 Canadian Championships	1; 81.78	1; 175.10	1; 256.88
November 7–8, 2014	2014 Cup of China	6; 72.85	5; 149.00	4; 221.85
October 24–25, 2014	2014 Skate America	7; 73.71	2; 158.53	3; 232.24
October 15–16, 2014	2014 Skate Canada Autumn Classic	5; 66.08	1; 159.55	2; 225.63

=== Junior ===
2013–14 season
Date	Competition	Level	PR	SP	FS	Total	Ref
26–28 March 2014	2014 World Championships	Senior	–	16; 66.75	9; 147.31	12; 214.06	
13–15 March 2014	2014 World Junior Championships	Junior	–	1; 72.87	1; 144.19	1; 217.06	
22–24 January 2014	2014 Four Continents Championships	Senior	–	10; 68.17	10; 136.52	10; 204.69	
9–15 January 2014^{CD}	2014 Canadian Championships	Senior	–	7; 70.97	4; 147.46	5; 218.43	
19–21 September 2013	2013 JGP Baltic Cup (Poland)	Junior	–	23; 40.18	12; 98.69	16; 138.87	
5–6 September 2013	2013 JGP Mexico Cup	Junior	–	4; 64.38	4; 116.66	4; 181.04	
2012–13 season
Date	Competition	Level	PR	SP	FS	Total	Ref
28 February – 2 March 2013	2013 World Junior Championships	Junior	–	16; 53.43	9; 119.15	12; 172.58	
18–19 January 2013	2013 Canadian Championships	Senior	–	6; 67.90	6; 132.79	6; 200.69	
20–22 September 2012	2012 JGP Bosphorus (Turkey)	Junior	–	3; 59.09	3; 112.47	3; 171.56	
23–25 August 2012	2012 JGP Courchevel (France)	Junior	–	11; 46.06	8; 102.39	9; 148.45	
2011–12 season
Date	Competition	Level	PR	SP	FS	Total	Ref
27 February – 3 March 2012	2012 World Junior Championships	Junior	1; 116.33	18; 51.13	11; 117.07	13; 168.20	
21–22 January 2012	2012 Canadian Championships	Senior	–	8; 57.32	6; 121.96	7; 179.28	
22–24 September 2011	2011 JGP Brasov Cup (Romania)	Junior	–	5; 54.82	2; 114.73	3; 169.55	
1–3 September 2011	2011 JGP Volvo Cup (Latvia)	Junior	–	12; 47.08	9; 101.87	12; 148.95	
Early career
Date	Competition	Level	PR	SP	FS	Total	Ref
17–20 January 2011^{CD}	2011 Canadian Championships	Junior	–	2; 55.22	1; 114.67	1; 169.89	
11–14 January 2010^{CD}	2010 Canadian Championships	Junior	–	4; 52.30	3; 96.51	3; 148.81	
