= Kevin Reynolds (figure skater) =

Canadian figure skater

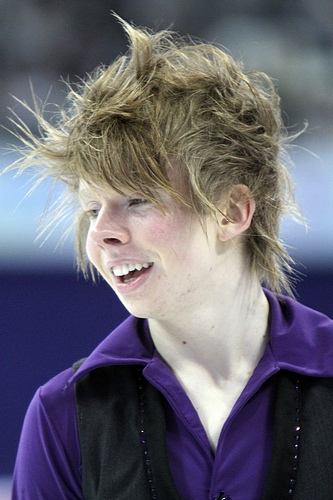
- Reynolds at the 2011 Cup of China

Personal information
- Full name: Kevin Reynolds
- Born: July 23, 1990 (age 36) North Vancouver, British Columbia
- Home town: Coquitlam, British Columbia
- Height: 1.77 m (5 ft 10 in)

Figure skating career
- Country: Canada
- Coach: Joanne McLeod
- Skating club: Champs International Skating Center
- Began skating: 1994
- Retired: December 19, 2018
- Highest WS: 16th (2012–13)

Medal record
Event	Gold medal – first place	Silver medal – second place	Bronze medal – third place
Olympic Games	0	1	0
Four Continents Championships	1	0	1
Canadian Championships	0	4	2
World Team Trophy	0	1	1
Junior Grand Prix Final	0	0	1
Medal list
Olympic Games
Silver medal – second place	2014 Sochi	Team
Four Continents Championships
Gold medal – first place	2013 Osaka	Singles
Bronze medal – third place	2010 Jeonju	Singles
Canadian Championships
Silver medal – second place	2012 Moncton	Singles
Silver medal – second place	2013 Mississauga	Singles
Silver medal – second place	2014 Ottawa	Singles
Silver medal – second place	2017 Ottawa	Singles
Bronze medal – third place	2010 London	Singles
Bronze medal – third place	2016 Halifax	Singles
World Team Trophy
Silver medal – second place	2013 Tokyo	Team
Bronze medal – third place	2012 Tokyo	Team
Junior Grand Prix Final
Bronze medal – third place	2006–07 Sofia	Singles

Kevin Reynolds (born July 23, 1990) is a retired Canadian figure skater. He is the 2013 Four Continents champion, 2010 Four Continents bronze medallist, 2014 Winter Olympics team silver medallist and a six-time Canadian national medallist (2012–14, 2017 silver; 2010, 2016 bronze). His highest place at a World Championship is fifth, achieved at 2013 World Championships. On the junior level, he is the 2006 JGP Final bronze medallist.

Reynolds is the first skater to have landed two quadruple jumps in a short program. He is the first to have landed five quadruple jumps in one competition — at the 2013 Four Continents, he landed two quads in the short program and three in the free skate.

== Personal life ==
Reynolds was born July 23, 1990, in North Vancouver, British Columbia to Daniel and Cindy Reynolds. His mother, Cindy Reynolds, is a cytotechnologist. He has a younger brother. Reynolds raised in Coquitlam. Kevin has Scottish, Ukrainian and a bit of Irish heritage. In addition to figure skating, Kevin trained hockey in his young years.

Reynolds was home schooled to accommodate his training schedule. He graduated from the University of British Columbia, in international relations, with a minor in Japanese Language and Culture in May 2019. He speaks three languages: English, Japanese and French. In December 2016 he passed the N2 level of Japanese-Language Proficiency Test, the second-hardest difficulty level and is organized by the Japan Foundation and Japan Educational Exchanges and Services. His interest in Japanese culture developed in his youth and amassed him a large Japanese following during his skating career. In 2016, he used the song "Tank!" from the anime Cowboy Bebop in a routine while dressed as the anime's protagonist Spike Spiegel. When asked in an interview at World Team Trophy, he stated that his favourite Pokémon is Farfetch'd.

At the 2023 Canadian National Championships Reynolds revealed that he was working on his master's degree in Public Administration. He also revealed that he was serving on the board of directors for the Green Party of Vancouver

== Career ==
=== Early years ===
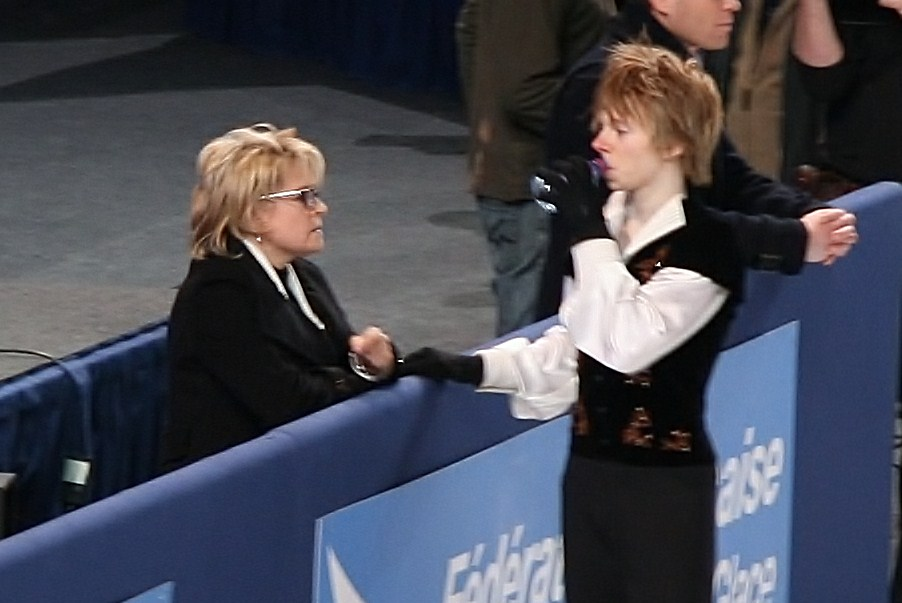
Joanne McLeod and Kevin Reynolds at the 2010 Trophée Eric Bompard

Reynolds began skating at age five and began training with coach Joanne McLeod when he was nine. He won the Canadian Nationals at the Juvenile level in 2001 and the novice level in 2003 at age 12. The next year, he was fourth at the junior level, giving him a spot on the junior national team. This earned him a spot to the Junior Grand Prix (JGP), where he placed 5th at his first event. At Nationals, he moved up to second place at the junior level.

=== 2005–06 season ===
Reynolds placed 9th in his senior national debut, at the 2006 Canadian Championships. At the 2006 World Junior Championships, he finished 7th after landing a 4S in the free skate.

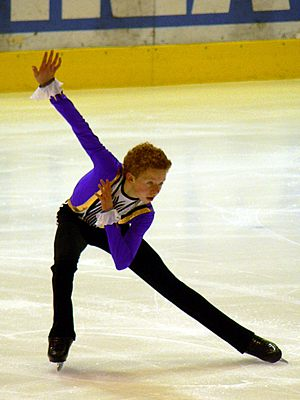
Reynolds in 2005

=== 2006–07 season ===
In the 2006–07 season, Reynolds won a JGP event in Mexico and placed second in Taiwan. At the JGP Final, despite suffering from food poisoning, he won the bronze medal after landing his first 4T in competition.

=== 2007–08 season ===
At the 2008 Canadian Championships, Reynolds landed a quad-triple-triple combination in his free program, the first Canadian to accomplish this. He is the second skater of three in the world, under the ISU Judging System, to land the combination in international competition, after Evgeni Plushenko and before Kevin van der Perren.

=== 2008–09 season ===
In 2008–09, Reynolds finished fourth in both Grand Prix appearances and at the national championships. He was assigned at the last moment to compete at the Junior World Championships, where he came in 9th.

=== 2009–10 season ===
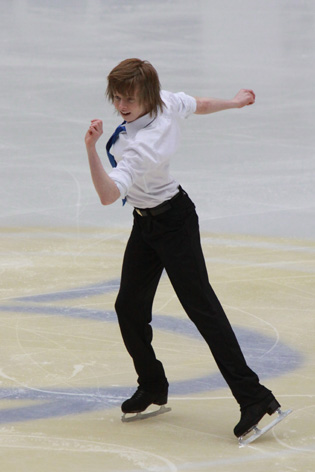
Kevin Reynolds under 2009 Cup of China

Although Reynolds was not selected for the Canadian Olympic team, Skate Canada assigned him to the 2010 Four Continents Championships and the World Championships. At Four Continents, Reynolds led after the short program, and although he faltered in the free skate, the combined score was enough to earn him the bronze medal. At his first World Championships, Reynolds popped a jump in the short program, but earned the second highest technical score in the free skate portion of the event, finishing in 11th place overall.

=== 2010–11 season ===
At the 2010 Skate Canada International, Reynolds became the first skater to ever land two quadruple jumps in a short program. Taking advantage of an off-season rule change allowing skaters to do both a solo quadruple jump and one in combination, Reynolds opened his program with a 4S-3T combo and later landed a solo 4T. The two elements netted him 26.32 points of his 80.09 total.

Reynolds was fourth at the Canadian Championships and was named to the Canadian team for Four Continents and as an alternate for the World Championships. He finished 11th at the 2011 Four Continents in February. In the short program he aggravated a hip injury from December and took time off following the competition, but began training again when he was added to the Canadian team for the 2011 World Championships, replacing Shawn Sawyer who had dropped out. He finished 20th at the event.

=== 2011–12 season ===
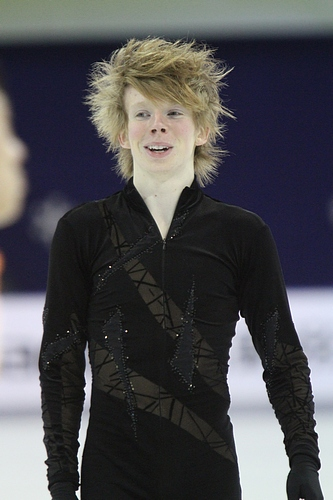
Reynolds at the 2011 Cup of China

In 2011–12, Reynolds was selected to compete at two Grand Prix events. He was seventh in his first event, the 2011 Cup of China, and withdrew from his second event, the 2011 Trophée Éric Bompard. He took the silver medal at the 2012 Canadian Championships and was selected to represent Canada at the 2012 Four Continents and 2012 Worlds. He finished eighth at Four Continents and 12th at Worlds.

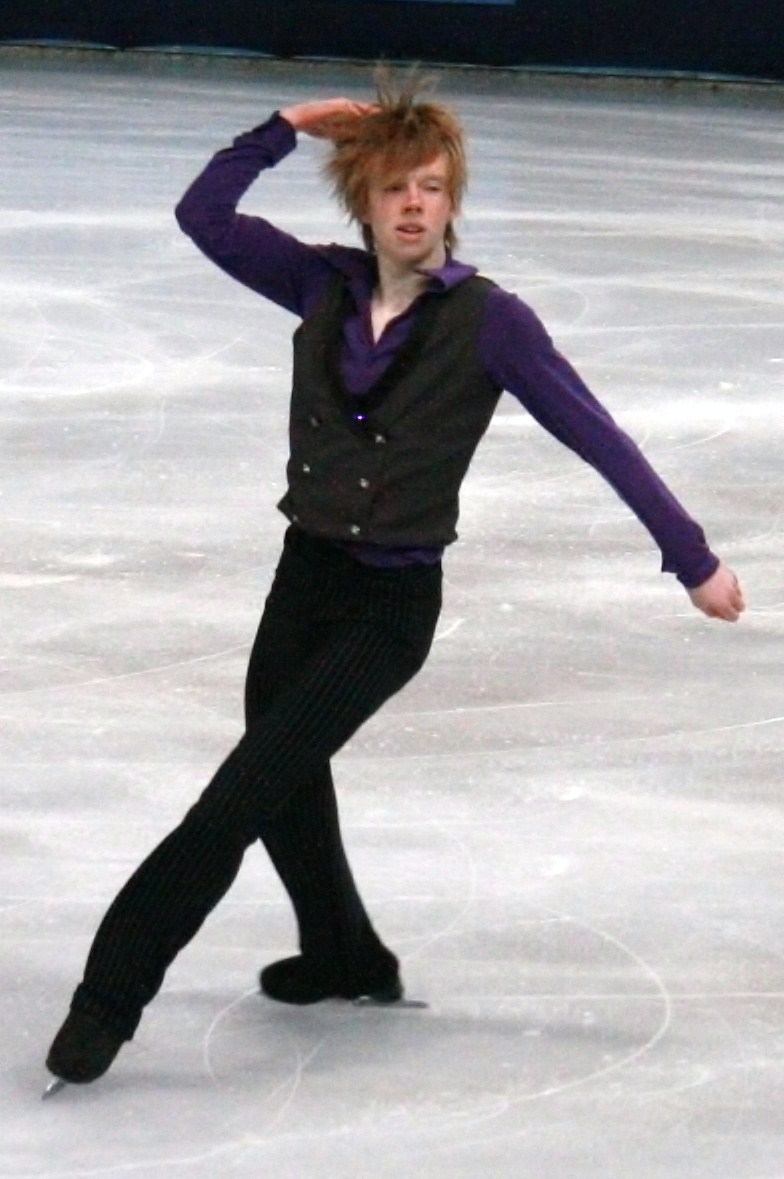
Reynolds at the 2011 Trophée Éric Bompard

=== 2012–13 season ===
During the 2012–13 season, Reynolds finished fifth and sixth, respectively, at his two Grand Prix events, the 2012 Cup of China and the 2012 NHK Trophy. He took the silver medal at the Canadian Championships for the second time. Reynolds was selected to represent Canada at the 2013 Four Continents and 2013 Worlds. He won gold at the Four Continents Championships. Following the event, a cyst ruptured in the back of his left knee. He finished 5th at the World Championships in London, Ontario, Canada.

=== 2013–14 season ===
In the 2013–14 season, Reynolds withdrew from his two Grand Prix events due to skate boot problems. He took the silver medal at the 2014 Canadian Championships and was selected to represent Canada at the 2014 Winter Olympics in Sochi. At the Olympics, he helped Team Canada win the silver medal in the team event and finished 15th in the men's singles event. He finished the season with an 11th-place finish at the 2014 World Championships.

=== 2014–15 season ===
In the 2014–15 season, Reynolds again withdrew from his two Grand Prix assignments due to injury and skate boot issues. He withdrew from the 2015 Canadian Championships after finishing 12th in the short program.

=== 2016–17 season ===
Kevin returned to prominence in the 2016–17 season. It began with a silver medal at the Nepela Memorial and then he won bronze at the Skate Canada International: his first-ever Skate Canada medal. He met disappointment with a 12th-place finish at the Four Continents. Despite falling in the Short Program, he finished 2nd at the 2017 Canadian Championships allowing him to compete at the World Championships for the first time in three years where he finished 9th with a personal best in the free skate.

=== 2017–18 season ===
In 2017–18, Reynolds was selected to compete at two Grand Prix events. He met disappointment with an 11th-place finish at the Finlandia Trophy. Reynolds was eighth in the 2017 Cup of China (moved up from 10th after the short program to eighth overall).

=== 2018–19 season ===
On December 19, 2018, Reynolds announced his retirement from competitive skating. In a statement, Reynolds said, “Despite an encouraging start to the season with a new personal best short program, I was unable maintain this form and my body has started to tell me it has had enough. It was a tough decision but given the circumstances I know it is the right choice.”

== Programs ==
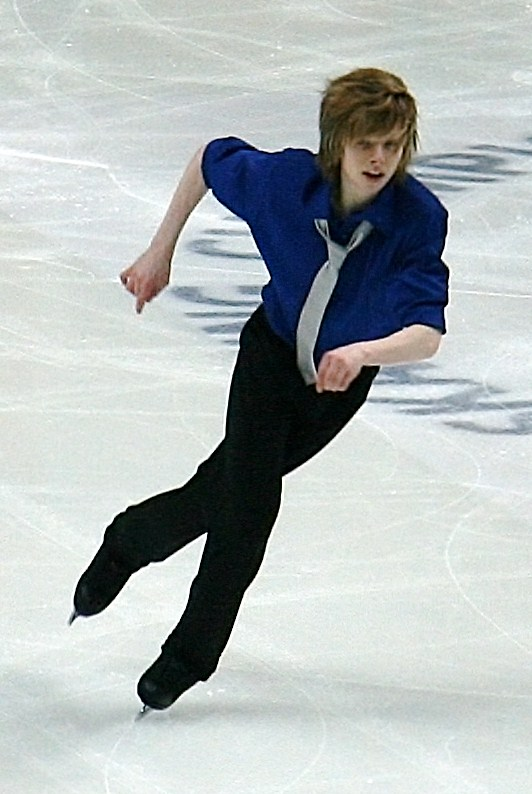
Reynolds at the 2011 World Figure Skating Championships

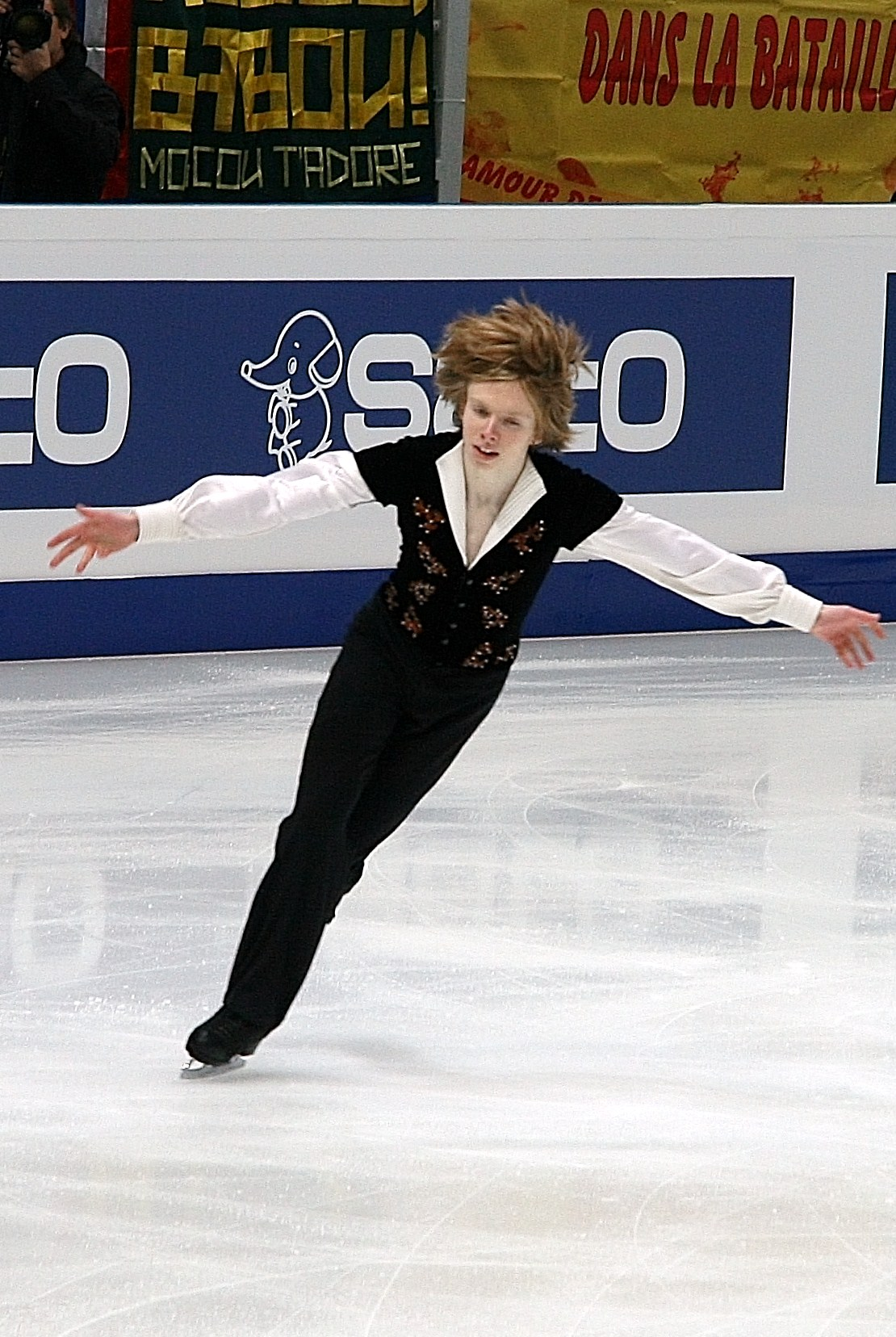
Kevin Reynolds at the 2011 World Figure Skating Championships

Season	Short program	Free skating	Exhibition
2018–19	Illusionary World by Nobuo Uematsu and Máire Breatnach (from video game Final Fantasy IV) choreo. by Lance Vipond	Chrono Trigger by Yasunori Mitsuda (from video game Chrono Trigger); Chrono Cross by Yasunori Mitsuda (from video game Chrono Cross) choreo. by Megan Wing, Aaron Lowe; Selections from Ni no Kuni by Joe Hisaishi (from video game Ni no Kuni)	
2017–18	Moanin' by Art Blakey choreo. by Shae-Lynn Bourne; Whiplash (soundtrack) by Justin Hurwitz, Hank Levy choreo. by Shae-Lynn Bourne	The Armed Man: A Mass For Peace by Karl Jenkins choreo. by Mark Pillay	Get Dancin' by Disco-Tex and the Sex-O-Lettes choreo. by Misha Ge
2016–17	Puutarhautuminen by Hohka; Kesäillan Tvist by Troka; Muuttosarja by Hohka choreo. by Shae-Lynn Bourne	Grand Piano by Victor Reyes choreo. by Mark Pillay	Mad World by Roland Orzabal; Back in Black; Thunderstruck by AC/DC choreo. by Shae-Lynn Bourne
2015–16	Tank! (from Anime Cowboy Bebop) by Yoko Kanno choreo. by Shae-Lynn Bourne	Grand Piano by Victor Reyes choreo. by Mark Pillay	Back in Black; Thunderstruck by AC/DC choreo. by Shae-Lynn Bourne
2014–15	Back in Black; Thunderstruck by AC/DC choreo. by Shae-Lynn Bourne	The Legend of Zelda by Koji Kondo (from video game The Legend of Zelda) choreo. by Kenji Miyamoto	
2013–14	Back in Black; Thunderstruck by AC/DC choreo. by Shae-Lynn Bourne	Excelsius by Larry Groupé choreo. by Lori Nichol	Hungarian Rhapsodies by Franz Liszt choreo. by Kenji Miyamoto; But Not for Me [Festival Jazz version] (from Anime Kids on the Slope) by Chet Baker choreo. by Kevin Reynolds; My Boi and Me (from Sharpay's Fabulous Adventure) by Ashley Tisdale, skated with Adelina Sotnikova
2012–13	Chambermaid Swing by Parov Stelar choreo. by Shae-Lynn Bourne	Concerto No. 4 in E minor for Piano and Orchestra by André Mathieu choreo. by Kenji Miyamoto	GAFU by Hiromitsu Agatsuma choreo. by Kenji Miyamoto
2011–12	Chambermaid Swing by Parov Stelar choreo. by Shae-Lynn Bourne	Chrono Trigger by Yasunori Mitsuda (from video game Chrono Trigger) choreo. by Megan Wing, Aaron Lowe	Moanin'; Drum Thunder Suite by Art Blakey choreo. by Shae-Lynn Bourne
2010–11	Moanin'; Drum Thunder Suite by Art Blakey and The Jazz Messengers choreo. by Shae-Lynn Bourne	Medley by Johann Strauss II choreo. by Shae-Lynn Bourne	Over the Rainbow by Harry Connick Jr. choreo. by Joanne McLeod, Kevin Reynolds
2009–10	Moanin'; Drum Thunder Suite by Art Blakey and The Jazz Messengers choreo. by Shae-Lynn Bourne	Immigrant Song; Whole Lotta Love; Stairway to Heaven by Led Zeppelin choreo. by Shae-Lynn Bourne	Over the Rainbow by Harry Connick Jr. choreo. by Joanne McLeod, Kevin Reynolds
2008–09	Armenian folk music choreo. by Tatiana Tarasova	Walpurgis Night (from Faust) by Charles Gounod choreo. by Tatiana Tarasova	A Foggy Day (In London Town) by Michael Bublé
2007–08	Big Noise from Winnetka by Kyle Eastwood; Canaro en Paris by Scarpino Caldasella; Corteo from Cirque du Soleil by Philippe Leduc; 9 de Julio by Cardenas Bayardo choreo. by Joanne McLeod	Violin Concerto D minor op 77 by Johannes Brahms; O Doux Printemps D' Autrefois by Jules Massenet choreo. by Joanne McLeod	
2006–07	JFK by John Williams; Arlington; Drummers' Salute choreo. by Joanne McLeod	Let's Dance by Stone and Bonin; Harlem Nodvie by E. Hagin; We'll Get It by SY Oliver choreo. by Joanne McLeod	Duel by Bond
2005–06	Laughing Buddha by Vanessa-Mae; Hoedown by Bobby McFerrin choreo. by Joanne McLeod	Varekai; Ombra by Violaine Corradi; Snake Food by Safri Duo choreo. by Joanne McLeod	

== Competitive highlights ==
GP: Grand Prix; CS: Challenger Series; JGP: Junior Grand Prix

=== 2009–10 to present ===
International
Event	09–10	10–11	11–12	12–13	13–14	14–15	15–16	16–17	17–18	18–19
Olympics					15th					
Worlds	11th	20th	12th	5th	11th			9th		
Four Continents	3rd	11th	8th	1st			11th	12th	7th	
GP Bompard		4th	WD							
GP Cup of China	8th		7th	5th	WD				8th	
GP NHK Trophy				6th		WD				11th
GP Rostelecom					WD					
GP Skate America	6th								9th	11th
GP Skate Canada		4th				WD		3rd		
CS Autumn Classic						6th				8th
CS Ondrej Nepela								2nd		
CS Finlandia									11th	
Gardena Trophy							2nd			
Nepela Trophy				4th						
Sportland Trophy							1st			
National
Canadian Champ.	3rd	4th	2nd	2nd	2nd	WD	3rd	2nd	5th	
SC Challenge							2nd			WD
Team events
Olympics					2nd T 2nd P					
World Team; Trophy			3rd T 8th P	2nd T 3rd P				4th T 10th P		
WD = Withdrew; T = Team result; P = Personal result. Medals awarded for team result only.

=== 2002–03 to 2008–09 ===
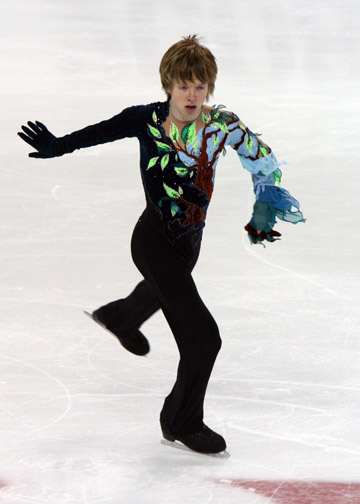
Reynolds at the 2008 NHK Trophy

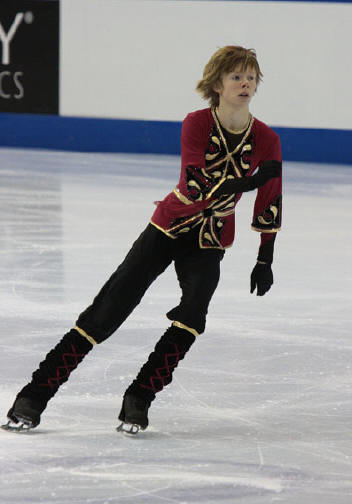
Kevin Reynolds at the 2009 Canadian Figure Skating Championships

International
Event	02–03	03–04	04–05	05–06	06–07	07–08	08–09
GP NHK Trophy							4th
GP Rostelecom						8th	
GP Skate America						9th	4th
International: Junior or novice
Junior Worlds				7th	5th	6th	9th
JGP Final					3rd		
JGP Andorra				4th			
JGP Croatia				8th			
JGP Mexico					1st		
JGP Taiwan					2nd		
JGP USA			5th				
Triglav Trophy	1st N						
NACS Waterloo			3rd J				
NACS Edmonton		1st N					
National
Canadian Champ.	1st N	4th J	2nd J	9th	11th	6th	4th
Levels: N = Novice, J = Junior

== Detailed results ==
Small medals for short and free programs are awarded only at ISU Championships. ISU personal bests are highlighted in bold.

2018–19 season
Date	Event	SP	FS	Total	Reference
November 9–11, 2018	2018 NHK Trophy	12; 61.14	10; 121.53	11; 182.67	
October 19–21, 2018	2018 Skate America	12; 61.62	10; 124.01	11; 185.63	
September 20–22, 2018	2018 CS Autumn Classic	6; 68.37	7; 130.46	8; 198.83	
August 16–19, 2018	2018 Super Series SummerSkate	1; 91.64	1; 129.22	1; 220.86	
2017–18 season
Date	Event	SP	FS	Total	Reference
January 22–27, 2018	2018 Four Continents Championships	13; 74.65	6; 166.85	7; 241.50	
January 8–14, 2018	2018 Canadian Championships	2; 86.20	6; 163.10	5; 249.30	
November 24–26, 2017	2017 Skate America	10; 69.10	9; 134.95	9; 204.05	
November 3–5, 2017	2017 Cup of China	10; 64.40	7; 162.10	8; 226.50	
October 6–8, 2017	2017 CS Finlandia Trophy	10; 60.03	11; 126.33	11; 186.36	
2016–17 season
Date	Event	SP	FS	Total	Reference
April 20–23, 2017	2017 World Team Trophy	12; 61.88	9; 150.41	4^{T} / 9^{P} 212.29	
March 29 – April 2, 2017	2017 World Championships	12; 84.44	8; 169.40	9; **253.84**	
February 15–19, 2017	2017 Four Continents Championships	12; 76.36	12; 145.95	12; 222.31	
January 16–22, 2017	2017 Canadian Championships	2; 81.76	2; 174.01	2; 255.77	
October 28–30, 2016	2016 Skate Canada International	3; 80.57	3; 164.49	3; 245.06	
September 30 – October 2, 2016	2016 CS Ondrej Nepela Memorial	2; 75.35	3; 152.45	2; 227.80	
August 18–21, 2016	2016 Super Series SummerSkate	2; 78.01	1; 163.21	1; 241.22	
**2015–16 season**
Date	Event	SP	FS	Total	Reference
April 15–17, 2016	2016 Gardena Spring Trophy	1; 77.26	3; 122.25	2; 199.51	
March 2–6, 2016	2016 Sportland Trophy	1; 67.84	1; 148.20	1; 216.04	
February 16–21, 2016	2016 Four Continents Championships	20; 55.14	8; 143.73	11; 198.87	
January 18–24, 2016	2016 Canadian Championships	3; 77.65	2; 158.53	3; 236.18	
December 2–6, 2015	Skate Canada Challenge	2; 77.73	3; 129.36	2; 207.09	
**2014–15 season**
Date	Event	SP	FS	Total	Reference
October 15–16, 2014	2014 CS Skate Canada Autumn Classic	7; 64.56	5; 132.04	6; 196.60	
2013–14 season
Date	Event	SP	FS	Total	Reference
March 24–30, 2014	2014 World Championships	15; 68.52	10; 146.99	11; 215.51	
February 13–14, 2014	2014 Winter Olympics	17; 68.76	10; 153.47	15; 222.23	
February 6–9, 2014	2014 Winter Olympics ^{team event}	-	2; 167.92	2^{T}	
January 9–15, 2014	2014 Canadian Championships	3; 78.29	2; 164.16	2; 242.45	
2012–13 season
Date	Event	SP	FS	Total	Reference
April 11–14, 2013	2013 ISU World Team Trophy	9; 73.52	2; 164.13	2^{T} / 3^{P} 237.65	
March 11–17, 2013	2013 World Championships	3; **85.16**	7; 154.82	5; 239.98	
February 6–11, 2013	2013 Four Continents Championships	6; 78.34	1; **172.21**	1; 250.55	
January 13–20, 2013	2013 Canadian Championships	2; 85.32	2; 175.94	2; 261.26	
November 22–25, 2012	2012 NHK Trophy	5; 70.20	6; 146.06	6; 216.26	
November 2–4, 2012	2012 Cup of China	6; 69.87	5; 132.20	5; 202.07	
October 3–7, 2012	2012 Ondrej Nepela Memorial	6; 52.40	2; 139.72	4; 192.12	
August 16–19, 2012	2012 Super Series SummerSkate	1; 69.79	1; 146.51	1; 216.30	
2011–12 season
Date	Event	SP	FS	Total	Reference
April 19–22, 2012	2012 ISU World Team Trophy	6; 78.82	8; 142.49	3^{T} / 8^{P} 221.31	
March 26 – April 1, 2012	2012 World Championships	12; 72.95	13; 144.25	12; 217.20	
February 7–12, 2012	2012 Four Continents Championships	9; 68.22	5; 135.04	8; 203.26	
January 16–22, 2012	2012 Canadian Championships	2; 80.81	2; 158.63	2; 239.44	
November 3–6, 2011	2011 Cup of China	7; 64.31	7; 140.10	7; 204.41	
2010–11 season
Date	Event	SP	FS	Total	Reference
April 25 – May 1, 2011	2011 World Championships	19; 64.36	21; 122.87	20; 187.23	
February 15–20, 2011	2011 Four Continents Championships	8; 65.47	11; 126.08	11; 191.55	
January 17–23, 2011	2011 Canadian Championships	5; 61.76	4; 130.09	4; 191.85	
November 25–28, 2010	2010 Trophée Eric Bompard	7; 66.13	4; 134.00	4; 200.13	
October 28–31, 2010	2010 Skate Canada International	2; 80.09	6; 138.56	4; 218.65	
2009–10 season
Date	Event	SP	FS	Total	Reference
March 22–28, 2010	2010 World Championships	14; 71.20	8; 145.38	11; 216.58	
January 27–30, 2010	2010 Four Continents Championships	1; 81.60	8; 131.39	3; 212.99	
January 11–17, 2010	2010 Canadian Championships	5; 67.39	2; 149.10	3; 216.49	
November 12–15, 2009	2009 Skate America	10; 59.05	5; 131.18	6; 190.23	
October 29 – November 1, 2009	2009 Cup of China	11; 60.12	7; 128.35	8; 188.47	

- **^team event** – This is a team event; medals are awarded for the team results only.
  - **^T** – team result
  - **^P** – personal/individual result

=== 2002–03 to 2008–09 ===
**2008–09 season**
Date	Event	Level	SP	FS	Total	Reference
February 22 – March 1, 2009	2009 World Junior Championships	Junior	6; 63.81	10; 105.55	9; 169.36	
January 14–18, 2009	2009 Canadian Championships	Senior	3; 70.00	5; 131.97	4; 201.97	
November 27–30, 2008	2008 NHK Trophy	Senior	6; 67.51	4; 132.23	4; 199.74	
October 23–26, 2008	2008 Skate America	Senior	4; 67.18	4; 137.71	4; 204.89	
**2007–08 season**
Date	Event	Level	SP	FS	Total	Reference
February 25 – March 2, 2008	2008 World Junior Championships	Junior	13; 55.77	4; 125.01	6; 180.78	
January 16–20, 2008	2008 Canadian Championships	Senior	7; 60.10	5; 122.48	6; 182.58	
November 22–25, 2007	2007 Rostelecom Cup	Senior	11; 59.46	6; 127.23	8; 186.69	
October 25–28, 2007	2007 Skate America	Senior	7; 59.25	9; 109.87	9; 169.12	
**2006–07 season**
Date	Event	Level	SP	FS	Total	Reference
February 26 – March 4, 2007	2007 World Junior Championships	Junior	4; 59.52	5; 118.80	5; 178.32	
January 15–21, 2007	2007 Canadian Championships	Senior	16; 50.46	6; 119.01	11; 169.47	
December 7–10, 2006	2006 ISU Junior Grand Prix Final	Junior	7; 53.08	3; 108.22	3; 161.30	
October 11–14, 2006	2006 ISU Junior Grand Prix, Chinese Taipei Cup	Junior	4; 52.72	1; 116.71	2; 169.43	
September 12–17, 2006	2006 ISU Junior Grand Prix, Mexico Cup	Junior	1; 54.19	2; 102.00	1; 156.19	

**2005–06 season**
Date	Event	Level	SP	FS	Total	Reference
March 6–12, 2006	2006 World Junior Championships	Junior	11; 53.04	5; 112.10	7; 165.14	
January 9–15, 2006	2006 Canadian Championships	Senior	11; 52.69	6; 118.58	9; 197.67	
October 11–14, 2005	2005 ISU Junior Grand Prix, Croatia Cup	Junior	9; 44.01	7; 94.55	8; 138.56	
September 7–11, 2005	2005 ISU Junior Grand Prix, Andorra Cup	Junior	4; 52.37	3; 104.46	4; 156.83	

**2004–05 season**
Date	Event	Level	SP	FS	Total	Reference
January 17–23, 2005	2005 Canadian Championships	Junior	2; 52.28	3; 93.32	2; 145.60	
September 9–12, 2004	2004 ISU Junior Grand Prix Skate Long Beach	Junior	4; 53.42	5; 93.57	5; 146.99	
August 26–29, 2004	2004 North American Challenge Skate (Waterloo)	Junior	1	3	3; 3.5^{TFP}	
**2003–04 season**
Date	Event	Level	SP	FS	Total	Reference
January 5–11, 2004	2004 Canadian Championships	Junior	6	4	4; 7.0^{TFP}	
