= Caroline Zhang =

American figure skater

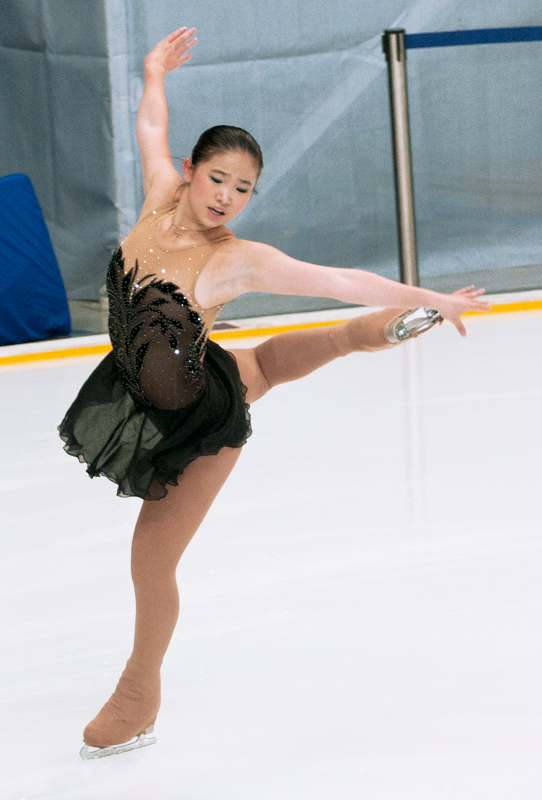
- Zhang at the 2012 Rostelecom Cup

Personal information
- Full name: Caroline Zhao Zhang
- Born: May 20, 1993 (age 33) Boston, Massachusetts, U.S.
- Home town: Corona, California, U.S.
- Height: 5 ft 5 in (1.65 m)

Figure skating career
- Country: United States
- Discipline: Women's singles
- Skating club: All Year Figure Skating Club
- Began skating: 1998
Four Continents Championships
Bronze medal – third place	2010 Jeonju	Singles
Bronze medal – third place	2012 Colorado Springs	Singles
U.S. Championships
Bronze medal – third place	2009 Cleveland	Singles
World Team Trophy
Gold medal – first place	2009 Tokyo	Team
World Junior Championships
Gold medal – first place	2007 Oberstdorf	Singles
Silver medal – second place	2008 Sofia	Singles
Silver medal – second place	2009 Sofia	Singles
Junior Grand Prix Final
Gold medal – first place	2006–07 Sofia	Singles

Caroline Zhao Zhang (born May 20, 1993) is an American figure skater. She is a two-time (2010 and 2012) Four Continents bronze medalist, the 2007 World Junior Champion, the 2006 Junior Grand Prix Final champion, and a three-time U.S. national medalist (bronze in 2009, pewter in 2008 and 2012).

== Personal life ==
Caroline Zhang was born on May 20, 1993, in Boston, Massachusetts. Her parents are from Wuhan, China, and her older sister, Yang Yang, was born in China. Caroline is bilingual in English and Mandarin. The Chinese media refers to her by her Chinese given name, Yuanyuan (simplified Chinese: 张圆圆; traditional Chinese: 張圓圓; pinyin: Zhāng Yuányuán, which means "round-round"). She moved to California at a young age. The Zhang family lives in Brea, California.

Zhang is proficient at the piano, was concert master in her middle school's orchestra on violin, and was a ballet dancer before switching to figure skating.

In April 2016, she became engaged to fellow figure skater Grant Hochstein. They married on August 18, 2018 and have two daughters, born 2021 and 2024.

As of February 2017, she was a student at Cerritos College in California.

== Career ==
=== Early career ===
Zhang started taking skating lessons at age five.

In the 2002–03 season, Caroline Zhang skated on the juvenile level, which is the lowest qualifying level in the United States. Zhang began her season by winning the silver medal at her regional championship to qualify for the 2003 U.S. Junior Championships. There she won the pewter medal (fourth place), juvenile level.

In the 2003–04 season, Zhang moved up to the intermediate level, which is one level up from juvenile. Zhang won her regional championship, which qualified her for a second time for the U.S. Junior Championships, this time at the intermediate level. She won the bronze medal.

In the 2004–05 season, Zhang moved up to the novice level, which was the first level then included at the U.S. Figure Skating Championships. Zhang won the silver medal at her regional championship to qualify for her sectional championship, where she won the pewter medal. At her first U.S. Championships, she won the novice pewter medal.

Li Mingzhu became her coach in 2005. Zhang moved up to the junior level in the 2005–06 season. She won the silver medal at her regional championship to qualify for her sectional championship, where she won the bronze medal. This medal qualified her to compete on the junior level at the 2006 U.S. Championships, where she placed 8th at the age of twelve.

=== 2006–07 season ===
Zhang made her debut on the international stage in the 2006–07 season. She competed on the 2006–07 ISU Junior Grand Prix and won her first event in Mexico by a record fifty-three points. She went on to win her second event by thirty-three points and then the Junior Grand Prix Final by twenty. Zhang became known for her creative spin positions, musicality and spiral extension, prompting comparisons to Sasha Cohen and Michelle Kwan by those in the figure skating community, including international judge Joe Inman.

Qualifying for the Junior Grand Prix Final qualified her for the 2007 U.S. Championships without having to qualify through her regional or sectional championships. Competing on the Junior level, Zhang won the silver medal behind Mirai Nagasu. Zhang was named to the U.S. team to the 2007 World Junior Championships, where she beat Nagasu to win the title. Zhang, Nagasu, and Ashley Wagner completed the first ever sweep by the United States of the World Junior ladies podium.

=== 2007–08 season ===
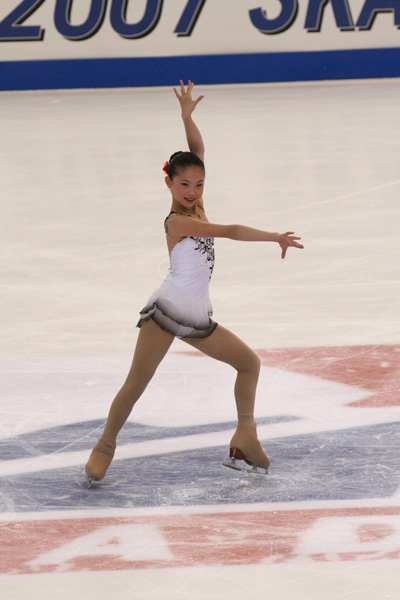
Zhang at the 2007 Skate America.

For the 2007–08 season, Zhang moved up to the senior level both nationally and internationally. She made her Grand Prix of Figure Skating debut at the 2007 Skate America, where she won the bronze medal. At this competition, she earned a level 4 and a +3 Grade of Execution for her trademark Pearl spin, which is the highest score a skater can receive under Code of Points. Zhang received deductions for underrotating jumps, costing her 17 points overall. Zhang went on to the 2007 Cup of China, where she received fewer deductions and won the silver medal. She earned 24 qualification points in the Grand Prix series. Following the result of 2007 NHK Trophy, she qualified for the Grand Prix Final, where she placed 2nd in the short program and fourth overall. She was the fourth World Junior Champion in a row to qualify for the Grand Prix Final in her first Grand Prix season.

Zhang had a bye through her regional championship due to Skate America and a bye through her sectional championship due to Cup of China. She made her senior national debut at the 2008 U.S. Championships, where she won the pewter medal. Zhang was placed on the U.S. team for the 2008 World Junior Championships, where she won the silver medal behind Rachael Flatt. With Mirai Nagasu taking the bronze, this was the second ever U.S. sweep of the World Juniors ladies podium.

=== 2008–09 season ===
In the 2008–09 season, Zhang competed for the second consecutive season on the Grand Prix. At her first event, the 2008 Skate Canada International, she placed third in the short program with a score of 53.28 after falling on her opening jump combination. She placed 5th in the free skate with a score of 97.52, after falling on one jump and omitting another, to place 5th overall. At the 2008 Trophée Eric Bompard, her second Grand Prix assignment, Zhang placed third in the short program with a score of 51.76 after omitting the required double Axel as well as receiving a Level 1 on her spiral sequence. Zhang scored 104.78 in the long program after receiving a downgrade on her triple flip-triple toe combination, as well as a deduction for a wrong edge take-off on her triple Lutz-double toe. She earned a Level 4 on all three of her spins and her spiral sequence. She scored 156.54 overall and won the bronze medal.

At the 2009 U.S. Championships, Zhang won the bronze medal, moving up one position from the previous year. She was placed on the teams to the 2009 Four Continents Championships and the 2009 World Junior Championships. She made her senior ISU Championships debut at the Four Continents Championships, where she placed 4th. She won the silver medal at the World Junior Championships.

On June 15, 2009, Zhang announced a coaching change to Charlene Wong. She returned to Li in August 2009.

=== 2009–10 season ===
Zhang was assigned to the 2009 Trophée Eric Bompard and to the 2009 Skate Canada International for the 2009–2010 Grand Prix Series. She placed 4th at the 2009 Trophée Eric Bompard with a score of 153.15 points and eighth at the 2009 Skate Canada where she earned 132.46.

At the 2010 U.S. Championships, Zhang placed 11th in the short program with 49.94 points after having problems with her jump combination and falling in her triple loop. She failed to improve her position in the free skate after falling on the triple flip-triple toe combination and stepping out of the triple Lutz. Her final score was 138.27 points.

She was assigned to compete at the 2010 Four Continents. She placed 5th in the short program with a score of 55.10 points after the triple flip in her triple flip-double toe loop combination was downgraded. In the free skate, she completed five triple jumps and earned level fours on all her spins and her spiral sequence to earn 105.68 points. Zhang placed 3rd in the free skate and won the bronze medal overall with 160.78 points.

On July 20, 2010, Zhang announced a coaching change to Tammy Gambill.

=== 2010–11 season ===
For the 2010–11 ISU Grand Prix season, Zhang was assigned to the 2010 NHK Trophy and the 2010 Skate America. She placed 7th in the 2010 NHK Trophy with 133.86 points and 9th at the 2010 Skate America with 132.49. Zhang competed at the 2011 US Nationals and finished 12th with an overall score of 140.95.

In January 2011, Zhang began training with Peter Oppegard.

=== 2011–12 season ===
Zhang worked on a triple loop-triple loop combination for the season. Zhang began her season at 2011 Skate America placed third in the short program with 55.05 points. In the long program she placed 10 with a score of 85.65 and finished 6th overall with 140.70 points. She then competed at a senior B event 2011 Ice Challenge where she finish first in the short program with a score of 52.82. In the long program she placed second with 99.90 points however, she finished first with 152.72. Zhang competed at the 2012 U.S. Nationals and finished 4th in the short program with 60.18, in the long program she placed third with 113.01. At the 2012 United States Figure Skating Championships Zhang placed fourth overall with 173.19. She then went on to compete at the 2012 Four Continents Championships where she placed fourth in the short program with 58.74 after she fell out of her triple loop-triple loop combination. In the long program Zhang placed third with a score of 117.44. Overall Zhang moved up to third with a total of 176.18 points and won her second bronze medal at the event.

=== 2012–13 season ===
Zhang began her international season at the 2012 Nebelhorn Trophy, where she finished 12th overall. She finished 9th at the 2012 Skate Canada and 10th at the 2012 Rostelecom Cup. At the 2013 U.S. Championships, Zhang placed 12th in the short, 9th in the long, and 11th overall. Her triple loop, triple loop combination was scored as under-rotated and downgraded, a decision with which her coach disagreed.

=== 2013–14 season ===
Zhang was assigned to one 2013–14 ISU Grand Prix at the 2013 Skate America where she finished 10th with an overall score of 110.12 points. After the event, she began to self-coach, saying that she did not want her coach to feel responsible when she skated poorly. She trains in Artesia, California, at the East West Ice Palace, an ice rink owned by the Kwan family.

Zhang finished 19th at the 2014 U.S. Championships.

=== 2014–15 season ===
Zhang began her season by finishing 3rd at the Southwest Pacific Regionals. She then went on to place 4th at the Pacific Coast Sectionals. This result qualified her to compete at the 2015 U.S. Figure Skating Championships where she finished 17th after placing 13th in the short program with a score of 55.40 and 19th in the freeskate with a score of 88.60, and a total score of 144.00.

=== 2015–16 season ===
In order to correct congenital hip dysplasia, Zhang underwent periacetabular osteotomy on March 3, 2015, and was able to resume skating in spring 2016. Due to her recovery, she did not compete in the 2015–16 season. She said that her goal was to compete at the 2017 U.S. Championships.

=== 2016–17 season ===
Caroline Zhang finished third at the Glacier Falls summer competition and first at the Golden West Championships summer competition. She placed 5th at the 2017 U.S. Championships, coached by Oppegard in Artesia, California.

== Innovative moves ==
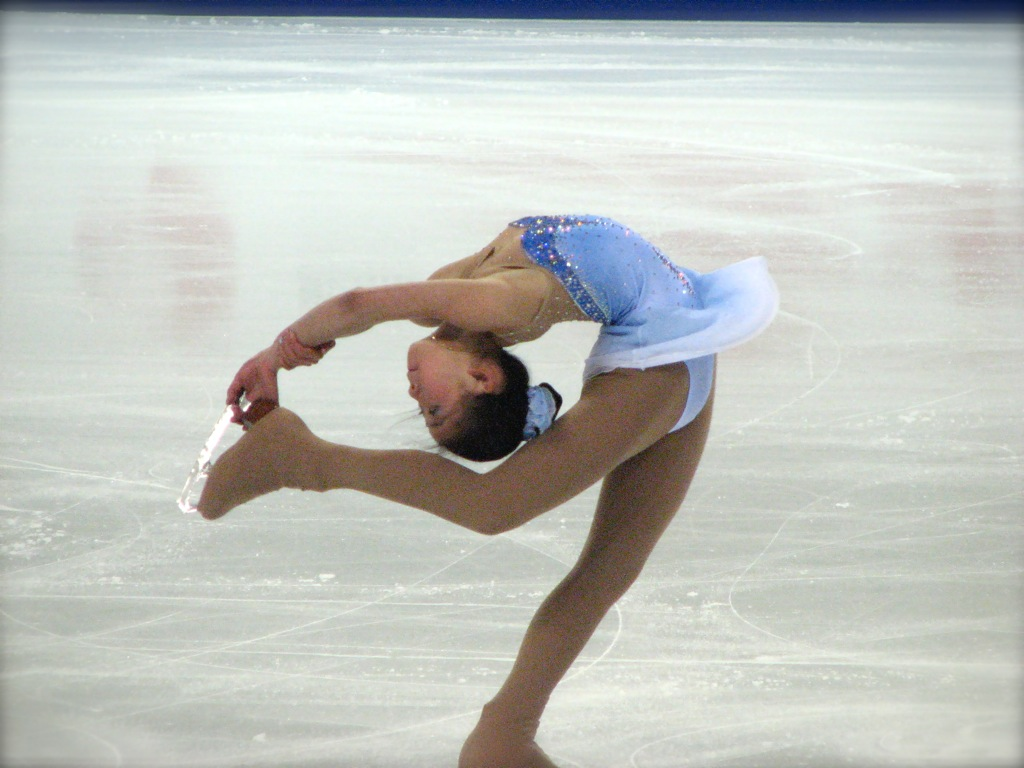
Zhang performs her signature pearl spin at the 2007–2008 Grand Prix Final.

Zhang has performed a spin position that her mother has called the Pearl spin, a cross between a catch-foot layback spin and a Biellmann spin. In this spin, the free leg is brought up to waist-height and the free blade is grasped with both hands. The back and head are bent down towards the knee, with the free leg held above the head in a Biellmann position. This makes the spin, in essence, a catch-foot layback in a Biellmann position, because the Biellmann position, according to regulations, is achieved when the level of the boot passes the head so that the boot is above and behind or over the head. It is a layback spin because it is an upright spin with the head and shoulders dropped backwards and the back arched downwards toward the ice. This position has become Zhang's signature spin.

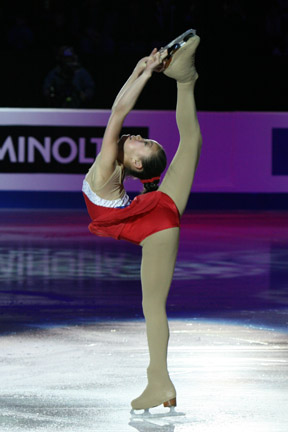
Zhang performs a hyper-extended Biellmann spin

Zhang also performs a hyper-extended Biellmann spin. She is one of several young skaters to perform this move. In this variation, the leg is pulled straight up in the air and the back bent as far into the spin as possible. Zhang is able to perform the spin with her free leg pulled straight up into the air, with very little knee bend, making the spin look closer to a capital-I position than the usual Biellmann teardrop shape. She has received a straight +3.00 grade of execution for her layback spin.

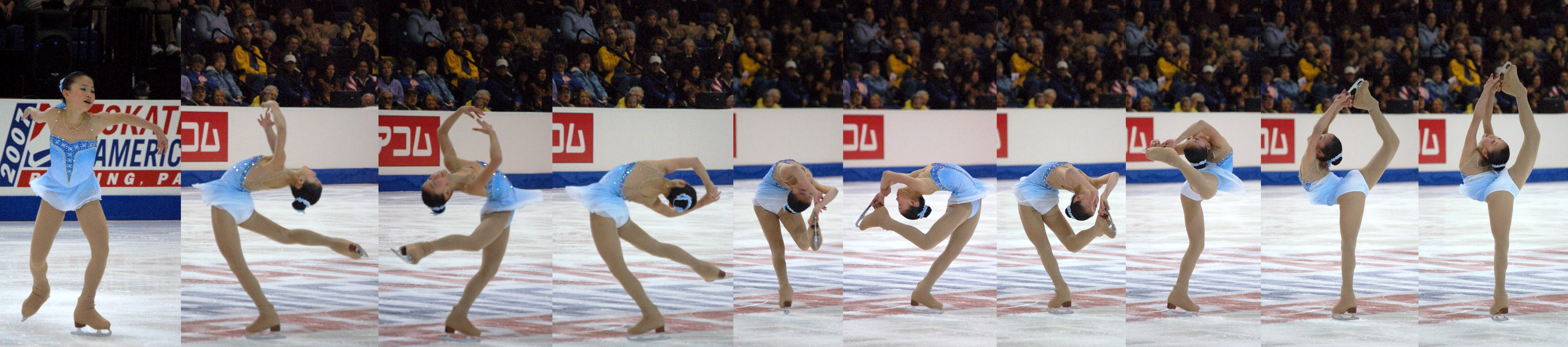
Zhang performs her signature layback spin: traditional layback (frames 2 and 3), side layback (frame four), pearl (frames five through seven), and Biellmann (frames 9 and 10)

== Programs ==
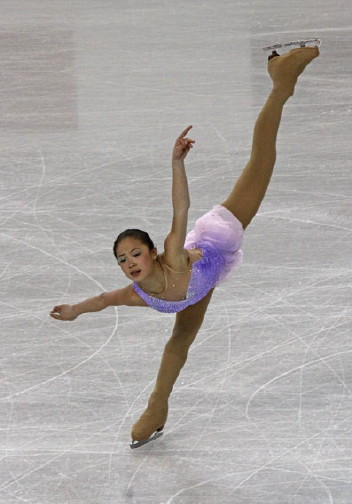
Zhang performs an arabesque spiral during her Ave Maria free skate at the 2009 Four Continents Championships.

Season	Short program	Free skating	Exhibition
2017–2018	East of Eden by Lee Holdridge	Gabriel's Oboe (from The Mission) sung by Hayley Westenra	Dante's Prayer (from The Book of Secrets) sung by Loreena McKennitt
2016–2017	The Swan by Camille Saint-Saëns choreo. by Peter Oppegard	Nella Fantasia (from The Mission) choreo. by Peter Oppegard	
2014–2015	The Phantom of the Opera by Andrew Lloyd Webber choreo. by David Wilson	I Dreamed a Dream (from Les Misérables) performed by Anne Hathaway choreo. by David Wilson	
2013–2014	The Phantom of the Opera by Andrew Lloyd Webber choreo. by David Wilson	Butterfly Lovers' Violin Concerto by Lü Siqing choreo. by David Wilson	
2012–2013	The Rushing Wings of Dawn by Tim Janis choreo. by David Wilson	Nessun dorma by Giacomo Puccini choreo. by David Wilson	
2011–2012	The Rushing Wings of Dawn by Tim Janis choreo. by David Wilson	Cello Concerto in B Minor by Antonín Dvořák choreo. by David Wilson	Defying Gravity (from Glee) performed by Lea Michele and Chris Colfer
2010–2011	Libertango by Astor Piazzolla choreo. by Tom Dickson	Cello Concerto in B Minor by Antonín Dvořák choreo. by David Wilson	
2009–2010	Zigeunerweisen by Pablo de Sarasate choreo. by Lori Nichol	Pas de deux from The Nutcracker by Pyotr Ilyich Tchaikovsky choreo. by Lori Nichol	Lullaby for a Stormy Night by Vienna Teng choreo. by Karen Kwan; In This Song by Charice choreo. by Karen Kwan; The Climb by Miley Cyrus choreo. by Karen Kwan
2008–2009	La Bayadère by Leon Minkus choreo. by Lori Nichol	Ave Maria by Franz Schubert choreo. by Lori Nichol; The Sleeping Beauty by Pyotr Ilyich Tchaikovsky choreo. by Lori Nichol	Lullaby for a Stormy Night by Vienna Teng choreo. by Karen Kwan; River by Joni Mitchell choreo. by Karen Kwan; On My Own from Les Misérables performed by Lea Salonga choreo. by Karen Kwan
2007–2008	Spanish Gypsy by Ray deTone choreo. by Tom Dickson	Ave Maria by Franz Schubert choreo. by Lori Nichol	Born to Try by Delta Goodrem choreo. by Lori Nichol; You Raise Me Up by Celtic Woman choreo. by Karen Kwan
2006–2007	Olga (from Ladies in Lavender) by Nigel Hess choreo. by Karen Kwan	Meditation (from Thais) by Jules Massenet choreo. by Karen Kwan	You Raise Me Up by Celtic Woman choreo. by Karen Kwan
2005–2006	O mio babbino caro by Giacomo Puccini choreo. by Karen Kwan	Meditation (from Thais) by Jules Massenet choreo. by Karen Kwan	

== Competitive highlights ==
GP: Grand Prix; CS: Challenger Series; JGP: Junior Grand Prix

International
Event	05–06	06–07	07–08	08–09	09–10	10–11	11–12	12–13	13–14	14–15	16–17	17–18
Four Continents				4th	3rd		3rd					
GP Final			4th									
GP Bompard				3rd	4th							
GP Cup of China			2nd									
GP NHK Trophy						7th						
GP Rostelecom								10th				
GP Skate America			3rd			9th	6th		10th			
GP Skate Canada				5th	8th			9th				
CS Ondrej Nepela												6th
CS Tallinn Trophy												4th
Int. Challenge Cup											2nd	
Nebelhorn Trophy								12th				
Ice Challenge							1st					
International: Junior
Junior Worlds		1st	2nd	2nd								
JGP Final		1st										
JGP Mexico		1st										
JGP Taiwan		1st										
National
U.S. Champ.	8th J	2nd J	4th	3rd	11th	12th	4th	11th	19th	17th	5th	11th
Team events
World Team; Trophy				1st T 3rd P								
J = Junior; T = Team result; P = Personal result; Medals awarded for team result only.

== Detailed results ==
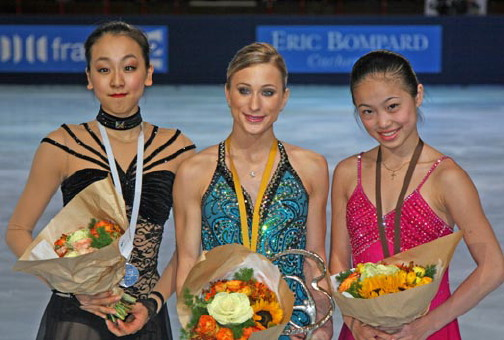
Zhang (far right) at the 2008 Trophée Éric Bompard.

2017–18 season
Date	Event	SP	FS	Total
January 3–5, 2018	2018 U.S. Championships	10; 60.29	14; 96.09	11; 156.38
November 21–26, 2017	2017 CS Tallinn Trophy	6; 56.35	3; 114.47	4; 170.82
September 21–23, 2017	2017 CS Ondrej Nepela Trophy	7; 53.48	6; 114.47	6; 167.95
2016–17 season
Date	Event	SP	FS	Total
February 23–26, 2017	Challenge Cup	3; 54.18	2; 112.75	2; 166.93
January 14–22, 2017	2017 U.S. Championships	7; 62.55	5; 120.27	5; 182.82
2014–15 season
Date	Event	SP	FS	Total
January 18–25, 2015	2015 U.S. Championships	13; 55.40	19; 88.60	17; 144.00
2013–14 season
Date	Event	SP	FS	Total
January 5–12, 2014	2014 U.S. Championships	19; 47.87	18; 85.19	19; 133.06
October 18–20, 2013	2013 Skate America	10; 45.76	10; 64.36	10; 110.12
2012–13 season
Date	Event	SP	FS	Total
January 19–27, 2013	2013 U.S. Championships	12; 49.99	9; 111.90	11; 161.89
November 9–11, 2012	2012 Rostelecom Cup	10; 46.15	10; 92.06	10; 138.21
October 26–28, 2012	2012 Skate Canada International	8; 52.97	8; 96.90	9; 149.87
September 27–29, 2012	2012 Nebelhorn Trophy	10; 45.43	12; 78.70	12; 124.13
2011–12 season
Date	Event	SP	FS	Total
February 7–12, 2012	2012 Four Continents Championships	4; 58.74	3; 117.44	3; 176.18
January 22–29, 2012	2012 U.S. Championships	4; 60.18	3; 113.01	4; 173.19
November 1–6, 2011	2011 Ice Challenge	1; 52.82	2; 99.90	1; 152.72
October 21–23, 2011	2011 Skate America	3; 55.05	10; 85.65	6; 140.70
2010–11 season
Date	Event	SP	FS	Total
January 22–30, 2011	2011 U.S. Championships	10; 48.48	12; 92.47	12; 140.95
November 11–14, 2010	2010 Skate America	5; 50.66	10; 81.83	9; 132.49
October 22–24, 2010	2010 NHK Trophy	6; 50.71	9; 83.15	7; 133.86
2009–10 season
Date	Event	SP	FS	Total
January 25–31, 2010	2010 Four Continents Championships	4; 55.10	3; 105.68	3; 160.78
January 14–24, 2010	2010 U.S. Championships	11; 49.94	9; 88.33	11; 138.27
November 19–22, 2009	2009 Skate Canada International	7; 54.58	8; 77.88	8; 132.46
October 15–18, 2009	2009 Trophée Eric Bompard	5; 57.26	5; 95.89	4; 153.15

2008–09 season
Date	Event	Level	SP	FS	Points
April 15–19, 2009	2009 World Team Trophy	Senior	4; 58.88	3; 116.80	1; 175.68
February 23 – March 1, 2009	2009 World Junior Championships	Junior	10; 47.64	1; 107.03	2; 154.67
February 4–8, 2009	2009 Four Continents Championships	Senior	5; 58.16	4; 113.06	4; 171.22
January 18–25, 2009	2009 U.S. Championships	Senior	3; 58.91	4; 112.17	3; 171.08
November 13–16, 2008	2008 Trophée Eric Bompard	Senior	3; 51.76	3; 104.78	3; 156.54
October 30 – November 2, 2008	2008 Skate Canada International	Senior	3; 53.28	5; 97.52	5; 150.80
2007–08 season
Date	Event	Level	SP	FS	Points
February 25 – March 2, 2008	2008 World Junior Championships	Junior	2; 62.60	2; 109.24	2; 171.84
January 20–27, 2008	2008 U.S. Championships	Senior	7; 53.49	4; 119.67	4; 173.16
December 13–16, 2007	2007–08 Grand Prix Final	Senior	2; 61.82	4; 114.66	4; 176.48
November 7–11, 2007	2007 Cup of China	Senior	2; 58.76	2; 97.58	2; 156.34
October 25–28, 2007	2007 Skate America	Senior	3; 56.48	3; 96.87	3; 153.35
2006–07 season
Date	Event	Level	SP	FS	Points
February 26 – March 4, 2007	2007 World Junior Championships	Junior	1; 59.17	1; 110.18	1; 169.25
January 21–28, 2007	2007 U.S. Championships	Junior	2; 53.87	2; 98.01	2; 151.88
December 7–10, 2006	2006–07 Junior Grand Prix Final	Junior	1; 56.28	1; 106.40	1; 162.68
October 10–14, 2006	2006 Junior Grand Prix, Mexico	Junior	1; 57.36	1; 105.06	1; 162.42
September 12–17, 2006	2006 Junior Grand Prix, Chinese Taipei	Junior	1; 58.93	1; 103.50	1; 162.43
2005–06 season
Date	Event	Level	SP	FS	Points
January 7–15, 2006	2006 U.S. Championships	Junior	7; 41.69	7; 80.50	8; 122.19

Historical World Junior Record Holders (before season 2018–19)
Preceded by (South Korea) Yuna Kim	Ladies' Junior Short Program; March 1, 2008	Succeeded by (United States) Mirai Nagasu
