= Jeremy Ten =

Canadian figure skater (born 1989)

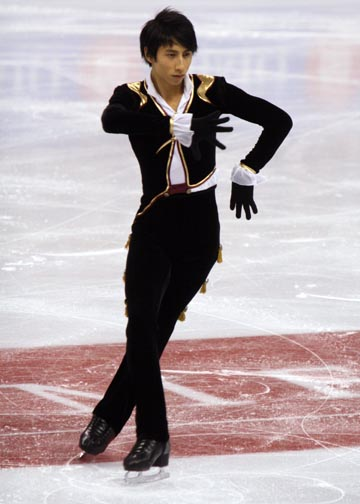
- Ten at the 2008 Skate Canada International.

Personal information
- Born: February 21, 1989 (age 37) Burnaby, British Columbia, Canada
- Height: 1.70 m (5 ft 7 in)

Figure skating career
- Country: Canada
- Coach: Joanne McLeod; Neil Wilson; Megan Wing
- Skating club: North Shore FSC
- Retired: June 12, 2015

Jeremy Ten (born February 21, 1989) is a Canadian former competitive figure skater. He is the 2013 Nebelhorn Trophy bronze medallist, 2014 CS Autumn Classic bronze medallist, and a three-time Canadian national medallist (silver in 2015, bronze in 2009 and 2012). He competed in the free skate at seven ISU Championships.

== Personal life ==
Jeremy Ten was born February 21, 1989, in Burnaby, British Columbia. He graduated from Magee Secondary School in Vancouver. In June 2015, he received a bachelor of arts degree in health sciences with a minor in kinesiology from Simon Fraser University.

== Career ==
Ten started ice skating as a hockey player at age seven and switched to figure skating at age nine. He began training at the BC Centre of Excellence in 2003 and skated there throughout his career.

Ten began competing on the ISU Junior Grand Prix series in 2005, placing 8th in Bulgaria. The following year, he won a bronze medal in France and placed 4th in the Netherlands before winning the Canadian national junior title at the 2007 Canadian Championships.

In the 2007–08 season, he took bronze at his JGP event in Bulgaria and placed 8th in Austria. He was 8th at the 2008 World Junior Championships.

In 2008–09, Ten made his senior international debut at two Grand Prix events and won bronze on the senior level at the 2009 Canadian Championships. He was assigned to the 2009 Four Continents where he finished 7th and then to the 2009 World Championships where he placed 17th.

In January 2011, Ten underwent surgery to repair a bone impingement problem and was off the ice for three months. In June, he sustained a spiral fracture of the left fibula. In late July 2011, Ten and his coach received an $8,000 grant from Petro-Canada.

Ten won bronze at the Nebelhorn Trophy in September 2013 and at the CS Autumn Classic, a Challenger Series event in October 2014. He received the silver medal at the 2015 Canadian Championships.

Ten announced his retirement from competition on June 12, 2015. He began skating on cruise ships in late 2016.

== Programs ==
Season	Short program	Free skating	Exhibition
2014–2015	Dance For Me Wallis (from W.E.) by Abel Korzeniowski	Hallelujah by Jeff Buckley	Nessun Dorma by East Village Opera Company
2013–2014	Dance For Me Wallis (from W.E.) by Abel Korzeniowski	Variations by Andrew Lloyd Webber	
2012–2013	Tango de Guignol by Bajofondo choreo. by David Wilson	Il Postino by John Bayless	
2011–2012	Come Together performed by Melo-M	Il Postino by John Bayless	The Blower's Daughter by Damien Rice
2010–2011	A Single Man	The Queen Symphony	
2009–2010	Come Together performed by Melo-M	The Queen Symphony	
2008–2009	Leyenda performed by Vanessa-Mae	Passion from August Rush	The Blower's Daughter by Damien Rice
2007–2008	Concierto de Aranjuez	Little Buddha	The Blower's Daughter by Damien Rice
2006–2007	Concerto de Berlin (from La Septième Cible) by Vladimir Cosma	Lemony Snicket's A Series of Unfortunate Events by Thomas Newman	

== Competitive highlights ==
GP: Grand Prix; CS: Challenger Series; JGP: Junior Grand Prix

International
Event	05–06	06–07	07–08	08–09	09–10	10–11	11–12	12–13	13–14	14–15
Worlds				17th						22nd
Four Continents				7th			14th		9th	12th
GP Rostelecom Cup										10th
GP Cup of China				7th						
GP NHK Trophy					10th	11th				8th
GP Skate Canada				10th	12th	8th				
CS Autumn Classic										3rd
Nebelhorn Trophy				6th					3rd	
U.S. Classic								7th		
International: Junior
Junior Worlds			8th							
JGP Austria			8th							
JGP Bulgaria	8th		3rd							
JGP France		3rd								
JGP Netherlands		4th								
Triglav Trophy										
National
Canadian Champ.	2nd J	1st J	11th	3rd	7th		3rd	8th	6th	2nd
SC Challenge			3rd				1st			
Team events
World Team Trophy										4th T 9th P
