= Emanuel Sandhu =

Canadian figure skater and dancer (born 1980)

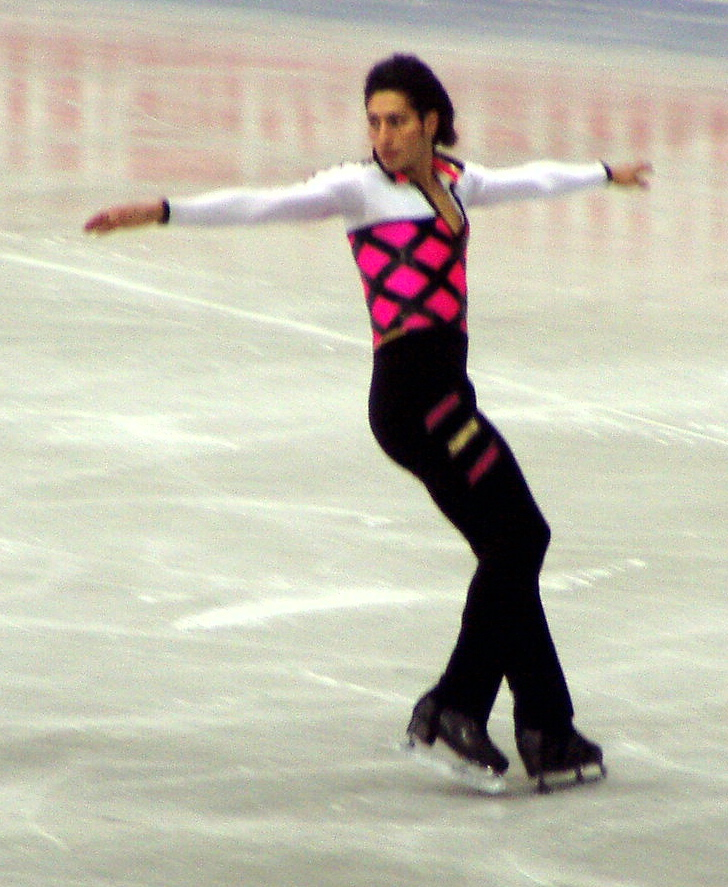
- Emanuel Sandhu competing at the 2004 Worlds.

Personal information
- Born: November 18, 1980 (age 45) Toronto, Ontario, Canada
- Height: 1.83 m (6 ft 0 in)

Figure skating career
- Country: Canada
- Coach: Joanne McLeod
- Skating club: B.C. Centre of Excellence
Medal record
Figure skating: Men's singles
Representing Canada
Four Continents Championships
Silver medal – second place	2004 Hamilton	Men's singles
Grand Prix Final
Gold medal – first place	2003–04 Colorado Springs	Men's singles

Emanuel Sandhu (born November 18, 1980) is a Canadian figure skater and dancer. He is the 2004 Grand Prix Final champion and a three-time Canadian national champion.

== Personal life ==
Sandhu was born on November 18, 1980, in Toronto, Ontario, Canada. He was raised in Richmond Hill, Ontario, with his younger brothers Chris and Daniel. His father, Lokraj, is Indian Sikh and his mother, Enza, was born in Italy. He is fluent in English, French, and Italian. Sandhu dabbles in modeling and singing.

== Career ==
=== Skating ===
Sandhu began figure skating at the age of eight. A year later, he was discovered by coach Joanne McLeod who would serve as his coach for his entire career. Sandhu later relocated to Burnaby, British Columbia, to continue training at the B.C. Centre of Excellence with McLeod, whom he credited as being his biggest support system.

He had early success in Canada, placing second in his first Canadian nationals. Sandhu's success qualified him for the 1998 Olympics in Nagano, but the Canadian Olympic committee refused to send him because, while he met the criteria of the Canadian Figure Skating Association, he did not meet theirs. He had missed the Grand Prix season because of injury while Langdon did not. Sandhu was a recipient of the Indo-Canadian Chamber of Commerce Lifetime Achievement Award in 1998.

Sandhu qualified for the 2002 Olympics in Salt Lake City, but was forced to withdraw before the short program due to injury. He also withdrew from the World Championships that year. Sandhu's father had left the family years earlier, and Sandhu was reunited with him prior to the 2002 Olympic Games. Sandhu stated that he was almost relieved to have to withdraw with an injury, because it was difficult dealing with his father's return.

Sandhu was the Canadian Nationals Champion in 2001, 2003 and 2004, and he won the Grand Prix Final in 2004, his most successful season. In winning the Grand Prix Final, Sandhu beat reigning World Champion Evgeni Plushenko and is one of only two people (with Brian Joubert) to beat Plushenko in the 2002-2006 quadrennium. This win was even more notable because Sandhu was a substitute, not having medaled at his Grand Prix events that season. Sandhu went on to win his third Canadian title and to take the silver medal at the 2004 Four Continents, his highest placement at the event.

Despite his various victories, Sandhu was inconsistent at major events. He kept his eligibility following the 2006 Olympics season. He competed at Cup of China, where he won the bronze medal, and Cup of Russia, where he placed fifth. At the 2007 Nationals, he was unable to hold onto silver and dropped to third, his lowest placement at the senior level at Nationals. His season continued its downward trend as he placed ninth at the 2007 Four Continents. He placed 16th at the 2007 Worlds.

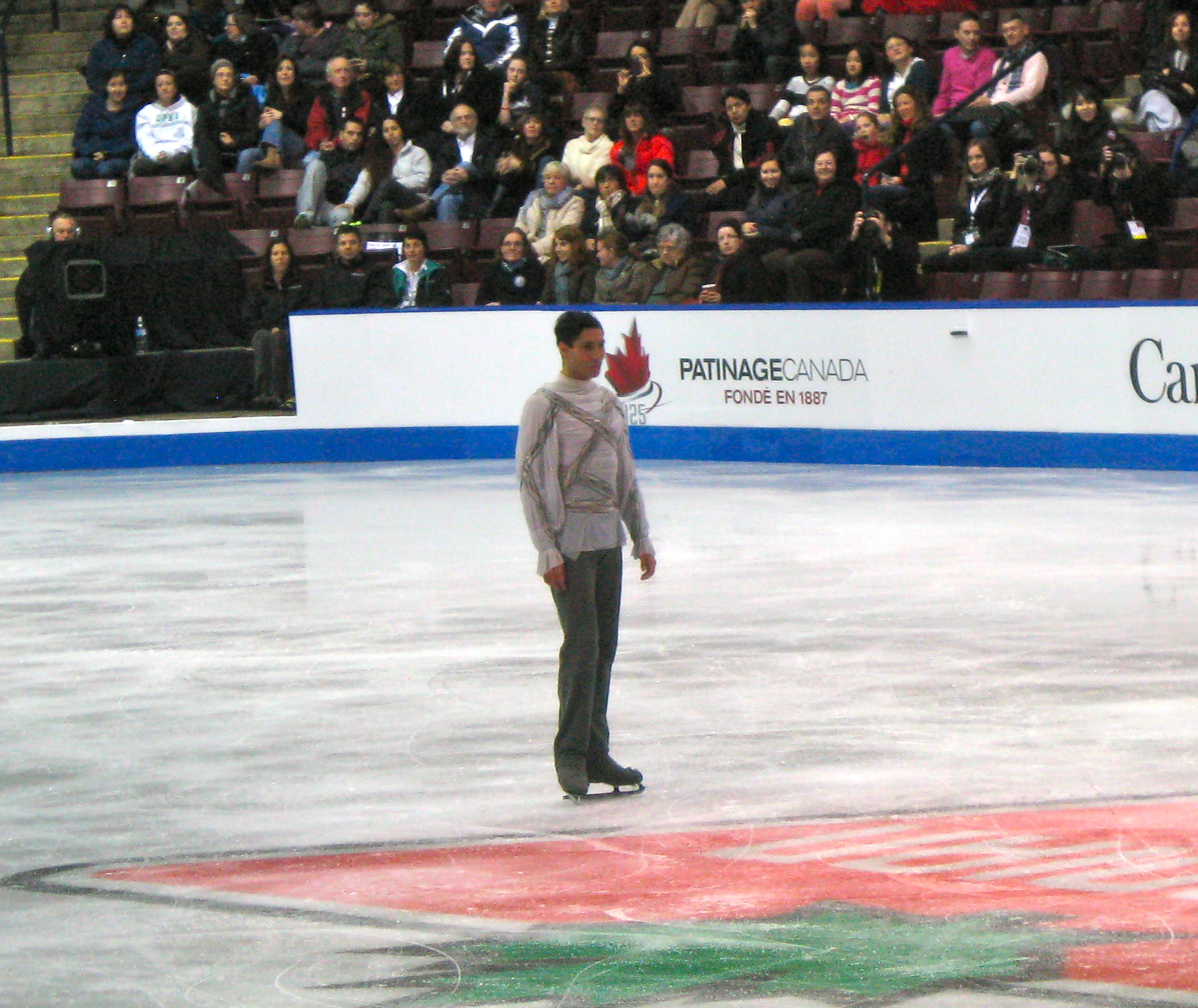
Sandhu making his comeback at the 2013 Canadian Figure Skating Championships

In 2011, Sandhu performed in the Art on Ice show in China. He also registered to compete in a qualifying competition for the 2012 Canadian Nationals, his first competition since 2007. He withdrew because of a foot injury and lack of preparation time due to ice shows.

Sandhu returned to competition in December 2012 at the 2013 Skate Canada Challenge; he finished fifth, which qualified him for the 2013 Canadian Nationals. Commenting on his decision to return to competition, Sandhu said, "I don't want the feeling I have when I look back on the sport to be one that isn't full of joy, happiness and satisfaction. I probably would think about it the rest of my life if I didn't try." He trained without a coach in Burnaby, British Columbia. Sandhu went on to finish 9th in the short program and 11th overall at the 2013 Canadian Nationals.

=== Dance ===
Sandhu began studying ballet at the age of three and continued to dance until the end of high school. He graduated from The National Ballet School of Canada.

In May 2008, Sandhu auditioned for So You Think You Can Dance Canada in Vancouver, British Columbia, and qualified for the final audition round in Toronto. He succeeded past all but the final round of auditions and was cut when selections were made for the show's Top 20.

Sandhu again auditioned during the second season of So You Think You Can Dance Canada, but this time made it into the Top 20. He finished in the Top 6 as the third-ranked male dancer.

== Programs ==
Season	Short program	Free skating	Exhibition
2012–13	Adagio in G minor by Remo Giazotto, Tomaso Albinoni		
2006–07	Pantera en Liberta by Monica Naranjo; Mambo by Wanyne	When Strangers Meet by Sharov, Jiping; Legends by Chun Yi; Tabla Beat Science by Tala Matrix	
2005–06	Tango by Lalo Schifrin	Original composition by Gordon Cobb	
2004–05	Rise by Safri Duo; Xotica by Rene Dupere	Piano Concerto No. 1 in E-Minor by Emil von Sauer	Like I Love You by Justin Timberlake
2003–04	Carlo Saura's Tango by Lalo Schifrin	Ninkov Latora by Violaine Corradi; Slow and Sassy by Henry Mancini; Take California & Bang On by Propellerheads	Like I Love You by Justin Timberlake; All Love Can Be by Charlotte Church
2002–03	Crazy Benny by Safri Duo	Ninkov Latora by Violaine Corradi; Slow and Sassy by Henry Mancini; Take California & Bang On by Propellerheads	Purple Rain by Prince
2001–02	A-Gusta; Crazy; Played-A-Live by Safri Duo	Piano Concerto 1 by Edvard Grieg; Lamento d'Ariane by Jules Massenet; Piano Concerto 1 in C for Orchestra by Herbert Howells	
2000–01	The Freedom Rider by A. Blakey; Back to the Apple by C. Basie	Journey of Man by Cirque de Soleil Orchestra	
1998–2000		Violin concerto (1st movement) by Bruch; Piano concerto n°2 (2nd movement) by Dmitri Shostakovich; Violin concerto (3rd movement) by Pyotr Tchaikovsky	
1997–98	Serenade for Strings by Pyotr Tchaikovsky	Piano concertos by Sergei Rachmaninoff	

== Competitive highlights ==
GP: Grand Prix; JGP: Junior Grand Prix

International
Event	96-97	97–98	98–99	99–00	00–01	01–02	02–03	03–04	04–05	05–06	06–07	12–13
Olympics						WD				13th		
Worlds		29th	18th		9th		8th	8th	7th	5th	16th	
Four Continents			10th	13th	7th		5th	2nd			9th	
GP Final								1st	4th	5th		
GP Cup of China								5th		1st	3rd	
GP Cup of Russia											5th	
GP Lalique/Bompard			3rd			9th			3rd			
GP NHK Trophy			6th									
GP Skate America					4th		6th					
GP Skate Canada						5th	2nd	4th	1st	1st		
GP Sparkassen				8th	6th							
Goodwill Games						8th						
Nebelhorn Trophy			6th									
Top Jump							2nd					
Sears Open					5th	2nd						
International: Junior
Junior Worlds		11th										
JGP France		4th										
National
Canadian Champ.	1st J	2nd	2nd	2nd	1st	2nd	1st	1st	2nd	2nd	3rd	11th
J; Junior; WD: Withdrew
