= Joanne McLeod (figure skating) =

Canadian figure skating coach

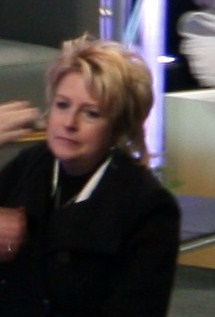
Joanne McLeod in 2010

Joanne McLeod is a Canadian figure skating coach. She is the skating director at the Champs International Skating Centre of BC (formerly known as the BC Centre of Excellence). Her current and former students include Emanuel Sandhu, Mira Leung, Kevin Reynolds, Jeremy Ten, Nam Nguyen, Emily Bausback, and many others. In 2012, McLeod became the first level 5 certified figure skating coach in British Columbia.

McLeod has a dance degree from Grant MacEwan College in Edmonton, Alberta, Canada. She also took classes at York University in Toronto, George Randolf in Toronto, Les Ballet Jazz de Montreal, and Alvin Ailey and Martha Graham in New York.

== Achievements ==
- coaching at three Olympic Games
- 17 World Championships
- 10 Junior World Championships
- four European Championships
- 17 Four Continents Championships
- Named Skate Canada National Coach of the year in 2004.
