= 2007–08 Grand Prix of Figure Skating Final =

2007–08 Grand Prix Final
- Type: Grand Prix
- Date: December 13 – 16, 2007
- Season: 2007–08
- Location: Turin, Italy
- Venue: Palavela

Champions
- Men's singles: (Switzerland) Stéphane Lambiel
- Ladies' singles: (South Korea) Kim Yuna
- Pairs: (Germany) Aliona Savchenko / Robin Szolkowy
- Ice dance: (Russia) Oksana Domnina / Maxim Shabalin
- Previous: 2006–07 Grand Prix Final
- Next: 2008–09 Grand Prix Final
- Previous Grand Prix: 2007 NHK Trophy

The 2007–08 Grand Prix of Figure Skating Final was an elite figure skating competition held at the Palavela in Turin, Italy from December 13 through 16, 2007. Medals were awarded in men's singles, ladies' singles, pair skating, and ice dancing.

It was the culminating event of the 2007–08 ISU Grand Prix of Figure Skating series, which consisted of 2007 Skate America, 2007 Skate Canada International, 2007 Cup of China, 2007 Trophée Eric Bompard, 2007 Cup of Russia, and 2007 NHK Trophy competitions. The top six skaters from each discipline competed in the final.

== Medals table ==
Rank	Nation	Gold	Silver	Bronze	Total
1	Germany (GER)	1	0	0	1
1	Russia (RUS)	1	0	0	1
1	South Korea (KOR)	1	0	0	1
1	Switzerland (SUI)	1	0	0	1
5	Japan (JPN)	0	2	0	2
6	China (CHN)	0	1	1	2
6	United States (USA)	0	1	1	2
8	France (FRA)	0	0	1	1
8	Italy (ITA)	0	0	1	1
Totals (9 entries)		4	4	4	12

== Results ==
=== Men ===
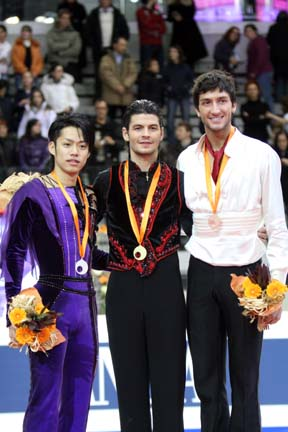
The men's podium. From left: Daisuke Takahashi (2nd), Stéphane Lambiel (1st), Evan Lysacek (3rd).

Rank	Name	Nation	Total points	SP		FS	
1	Stéphane Lambiel	Switzerland	239.10	2	83.80	1	155.30
2	Daisuke Takahashi	Japan	238.94	1	84.20	2	154.74
3	Evan Lysacek	United States	229.78	3	79.70	3	150.08
4	Johnny Weir	United States	216.16	4	74.80	4	141.36
5	Patrick Chan	Canada	208.13	6	68.86	5	139.27
6	Kevin van der Perren	Belgium	189.52	5	72.83	6	116.69

=== Ladies ===
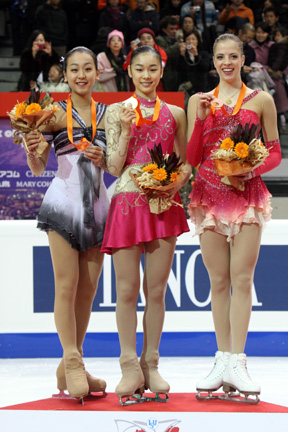
The ladies' podium. From left: Mao Asada (2nd), Kim Yuna (1st), Carolina Kostner (3rd).

Rank	Name	Nation	Total points	SP		FS	
1	Kim Yuna	South Korea	196.83	1	64.62	2	132.21
2	Mao Asada	Japan	191.59	6	59.04	1	132.55
3	Carolina Kostner	Italy	178.93	3	59.86	3	119.07
4	Caroline Zhang	United States	176.48	2	61.82	4	114.66
5	Yukari Nakano	Japan	172.96	4	59.78	5	113.18
6	Kimmie Meissner	United States	154.22	5	59.08	6	95.14

=== Pairs ===
Aliona Savchenko / Robin Szolkowy from Germany set a new world record of 72.14 points under the ISU Judging System for pairs' short program.

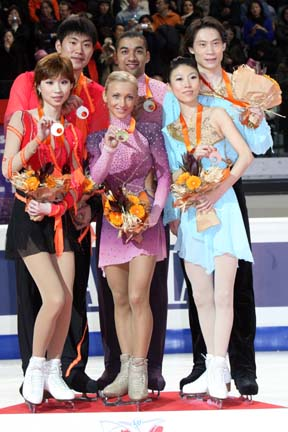
The pairs' podium. From left: Zhang Dan / Zhang Hao (2nd), Aliona Savchenko / Robin Szolkowy (1st), Pang Qing / Tong Jian (3rd).

Rank	Name	Nation	Total points	SP		FS	
1	Aliona Savchenko / Robin Szolkowy	Germany	199.23	1	72.14	1	127.09
2	Zhang Dan / Zhang Hao	China	191.20	2	71.40	2	119.80
3	Pang Qing / Tong Jian	China	185.13	3	66.68	3	118.45
4	Jessica Dubé / Bryce Davison	Canada	172.43	4	57.06	4	115.37
5	Yuko Kawaguchi / Alexander Smirnov	Russia	161.75	6	51.74	5	110.01
WD	Keauna McLaughlin / Rockne Brubaker	United States		5	55.24		

=== Ice dancing ===
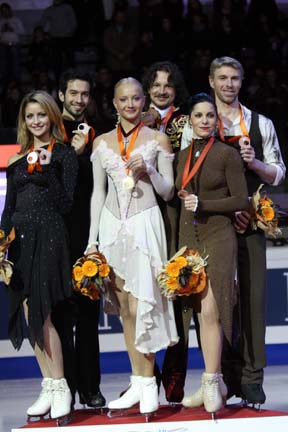
The ice dancing podium. From left: Tanith Belbin / Benjamin Agosto (2nd), Oksana Domnina / Maxim Shabalin (1st), Isabelle Delobel / Olivier Schoenfelder (3rd).

Rank	Name	Nation	Total points	OD		FD	
1	Oksana Domnina / Maxim Shabalin	Russia	165.57	3	62.31	1	103.26
2	Tanith Belbin / Benjamin Agosto	United States	164.14	1	63.64	2	100.50
3	Isabelle Delobel / Olivier Schoenfelder	France	163.40	2	63.29	3	100.11
4	Tessa Virtue / Scott Moir	Canada	159.40	4	61.14	4	98.26
5	Jana Khokhlova / Sergei Novitski	Russia	153.58	5	58.30	5	95.28
6	Nathalie Péchalat / Fabian Bourzat	France	140.82	6	57.73	6	83.09
