= BC Centre of Excellence =

Figure skating training center in Burnaby, British Columbia

The "Champs International Skating Centre of British Columbia" (formerly known as the 'BC Centre of Excellence') is one of two major figure skating training centers in Canada. Located in Burnaby, British Columbia, it is home to many great national and international skaters. The programs there are overseen by a staff, including Joanne McLeod, who coaches several National, World, and Olympic figure skating champions.

The center operates out of Canlan Ice Sports Burnaby 8 Rinks. Notable skaters who train there include Emanuel Sandhu, Mira Leung, Allie Hann-McCurdy & Michael Coreno, Jessica Miller & Ian Moram, Jeremy Ten, and Kevin Reynolds. This skating school is sometimes known as a training site for international competitors to practice for competitions in Vancouver. Champs International hosts its annual competition known as the BC/YK Summer Skate Competition every August.

== See also ==
- Mariposa School of Skating
