= Mira Leung =

Canadian figure skater

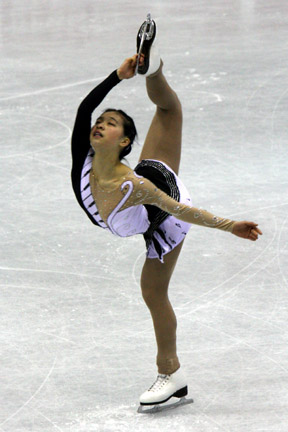
- Mira Leung in 2008.

Personal information
- Born: March 28, 1989 (age 37) Vancouver, British Columbia
- Height: 1.68 m (5 ft 6 in)

Figure skating career
- Country: Canada
- Skating club: North Shore WC; Vancouver SC
- Began skating: 1992
- Retired: 2010

Mira Leung
- Traditional Chinese: 梁美諾
- Simplified Chinese: 梁美诺
Transcriptions
Standard Mandarin
- Hanyu Pinyin: Liáng Měinuò
Yue: Cantonese
- Yale Romanization: Leùhng Méinohk

Mira Leung (born March 28, 1989) is a Canadian former competitive figure skater. She is the 2004 Nebelhorn Trophy bronze medallist and a three-time Canadian national silver medallist (2006–2008). Leung placed 12th at the 2006 Winter Olympics and 5th at the 2008 Four Continents. She now works for Google as a software engineering manager.

== Personal life ==
Mira Leung was born on March 28, 1989, in Vancouver, British Columbia, to Jennifer and Raymond Leung, a computer programmer. She attended Trafalgar Elementary School in Vancouver and enrolled in the French immersion program. She began playing the piano at age three and studied it through grade 10. She graduated from high school in 2008.

== Career ==
Mira Leung started skating at age three and began taking lessons two years later. As a young child, she skated at the Kitsilano Figure Skating Club, coached by Christine Goodall. She was eight when she first landed a triple salchow and triple toe loop. Joanne McLeod became her coach in 2001 or 2002.

Leung debuted in the ISU Junior Grand Prix series in 2002. Deciding to skip the national novice and junior levels, Leung competed on the senior level at the 2003 Canadian Championships.

In the 2004–05 season, Leung made her senior Grand Prix debut, replacing the injured Annie Bellemare at the 2004 Skate Canada International. She won her first national medal, bronze, at the 2005 Canadian Championships.

After winning the silver medal behind Joannie Rochette at the 2006 Canadian Championships, Leung was named in Canada's team to the 2006 Winter Olympics and 2006 World Championships. She finished 12th at the Olympics in Turin and then 13th at Worlds. Due to a training dispute, McLeod quit as her coach at the end of the season. Leung found a new coach in Christine McBeth at Minoru Arenas in Richmond, British Columbia.

On November 9, 2006, Leung announced that she and McLeod had agreed to resume working together, having been advised to reunite by Canadian skating officials at the 2006 Skate Canada International. Leung won another national silver medal and was sent to the 2007 World Championships. On the day of the Worlds short program, Leung felt pain in her left heel and Canada's team doctor told her she had Achilles tendinitis. She decided to compete and finished 24th at the event.

In the 2007–08 season, Leung was 5th at both of her Grand Prix events, Skate America and Trophee Eric Bompard. She changed her short program in late December 2007, a few weeks before the 2008 Canadian Championships in mid-January. After winning her third silver medal, Leung received assignments to the 2008 Four Continents, where she placed 5th, and the 2008 World Championships, where she came in 14th.

After McLeod decided to end their collaboration in early October 2008, Leung began working with Jennifer Jiang. She finished 6th at the 2009 Canadian Championships.

In 2009, Leung began training at Vancouver's Sunset Skating Club with Sonja Hlynka. She withdrew from the 2010 Canadian Championships after placing 15th of 18 women in the short program.

In March 2010, Leung and fellow figure skater, Joannie Rochette, walked down the runway at The Heart Truth fashion show in Toronto.

== Programs ==
Season	Short program	Free skating	Exhibition
2008–09	A Transylvanian Lullaby John Morris; Witches of Eastwick John Williams; La Bayadère by Ludwig Minkus	Piano Concerto No. 2; Piano Concerto No. 3 by Sergei Rachmaninoff	
2007–08	La Bayadère by Ludwig Minkus; Variation on a Theme of The Pink Panther by Henry Mancini	Piano Concerto No. 2; Piano Concerto No. 3 by Sergei Rachmaninoff	Variation on a Theme of The Pink Panther by Henry Mancini
2006–07	Freedom	Terracotta Warriors (soundtrack)	
2005–06	Freedom	Terracotta Warriors (soundtrack); Alexander by Vangelis; Dance of the Seven Veils (from Salome) by Richard Strauss	
2004–05	Rachel's Song by Vangelis; Viva! (Orion mix) performed by Bond (based on The Four Seasons) by Antonio Vivaldi	The Firebird by Igor Stravinsky performed by the London Philharmonic Orchestra	
2003–04	Of Heaven & Earth by Cui Lan and Hou Muren	Le Corsaire; Pas de Deux (from The Nutcracker, Act 11) by Pyotr I. Tchaikovsky performed by the London Symphony Orchestra	
2002–03	Of Heaven & Earth by Cui Lan and Hou Muren	Xotica by René Dupéré; Love Affair by Ennio Morricone; Reflection of Earth	

== Competitive highlights ==
GP: Grand Prix; JGP: Junior Grand Prix

International
Event	99–00	02–03	03–04	04–05	05–06	06–07	07–08	08–09	09–10
Olympics					12th				
Worlds					13th	24th	14th		
Four Continents							5th		
GP Bompard							5th		
GP Cup of China				7th				11th	
GP Skate America					6th	8th	5th	7th	
GP Skate Canada				7th	6th	6th			
Nebelhorn Trophy				3rd					
International: Junior or novice
Junior Worlds				8th					
JGP Slovakia		14th							
JGP Slovenia			8th						
Mladost Trophy	4th N.								
National
Canadian Champ.		14th	5th	3rd	2nd	2nd	2nd	6th	WD
N: Novice level; WD: Withdrew
