= Mona Jönsson =

Swedish politician (born 1951)

Mona Jönsson (born March 18, 1951) is a Swedish Green Party politician. She was a member of the Riksdag from 2002 to 2006.
