= Jessica Miller (figure skater) =

Retired figure skater

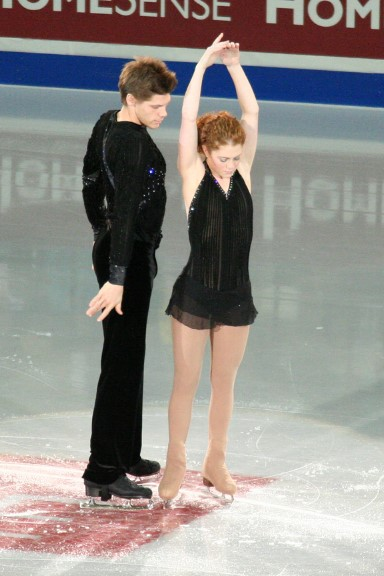
- Miller & Moram in 2006.

Personal information
- Born: March 1, 1981 (age 45)

Figure skating career
- Country: Canada
- Skating club: BC Centre of Excellence
- Retired: May 9, 2008

Jessica Miller (born March 1, 1981, in Westerville, Ohio, U.S.) is a retired pair skater who represented Canada in international competition for much of her career. She teamed up with Ian Moram in 2002. Miller and Moram trained at the BC Centre of Excellence and were coached by Bruno Marcotte. They announced their retirement from competitive skating on May 9, 2008.

Miller previously represented the United States in competitions alongside Jeffrey Weiss and Kevin Garrett.

Miller has dual citizenship with the United States and Canada.

== Competitive highlights ==
=== With Moram for Canada ===
International
Event	2003–04	2004–05	2005–06	2006–07	2007–08
Four Continents					5th
GP Bompard					6th
GP Cup of China					3rd
GP Skate Canada				7th	
Nebelhorn				6th	
National
Canadian Champ.	5th	6th	7th	8th	6th
GP = Grand Prix

=== With Weiss for the United States ===
International
Event	1999–2000	2000–2001
GP Skate America		7th
Ondrej Nepela Memorial		3rd
National
U.S. Championships	6th	7th
GP = Grand Prix

=== With Garrett for the United States ===
National
Event	1996–97	1997–98
U.S. Championships	11th J.	12th J.
J. = Junior level

== Programs ==
(with Moram)

Season	Short program	Free skating
2007–2008	Wayfering Pilgrim by Roy Buchanan	Il Postino by Luis Bacalor
2006–2007	Black Magic Woman by Santana	Nouvelle France
