= Ian Moram =

Canadian pair skater

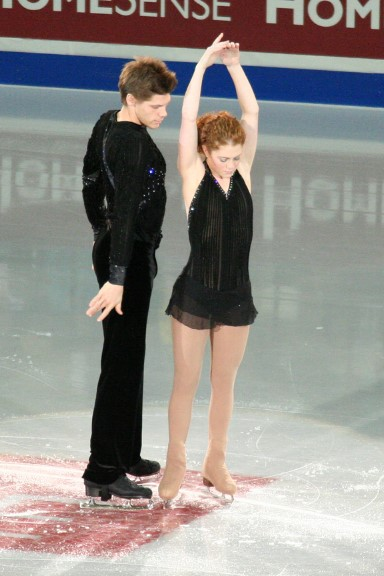
- Moram and Miller in 2006.

Personal information
- Born: February 8, 1980 (age 46) Montreal, Quebec, Canada

Figure skating career
- Country: Canada
- Skating club: BC Centre of Excellence
- Retired: May 9, 2008

Ian Moram (born February 8, 1980) is a Canadian pair skater. He teamed up with Jessica Miller in 2002. Miller and Moram trained at the BC Centre of Excellence and were coached by Bruno Marcotte. They announced their retirement from competitive skating on May 9, 2008. Moram previously competed with Chantal Poirier and Meeran Trombley.

== Competitive highlights ==
=== With Miller ===
International
Event	2003–04	2004–05	2005–06	2006–07	2007–08
Four Continents					5th
GP Bompard					6th
GP Cup of China					3rd
GP Skate Canada				7th	
Nebelhorn				6th	
National
Canadian Champ.	5th	6th	7th	8th	6th
GP = Grand Prix

=== With Poirier ===
International
Event	2000–01	2001–02
GP Skate Canada		7th
Golden Spin of Zagreb		3rd
National
Canadian Championships	5th J.	6th
GP = Grand Prix

=== With Trombley ===
National
Event	1998–99	99–2000
Canadian Championships	4th N.	6th J.
Levels: N. = Novice; J. = Junior

== Programs ==
(with Miller)

Season	Short program	Free skating
2007–2008	Wayfering Pilgrim by Roy Buchanan	Il Postino by Luis Bacalor
2006–2007	Black Magic Woman by Santana	Nouvelle France
