= Sheri Moir =

Canadian figure skater (born 1981)

Personal information
- Born: September 17, 1981 (age 44) London, Ontario, Canada

Figure skating career
- Country: Canada
- Partner: Danny Moir
Medal record
Representing Canada
Synchronized skating
World Championships
Bronze medal – third place	2007 London	Synchronized skating

Sheri Moir (/ˈmɔɪjər/ MOY-ər; born September 17, 1981) is a Canadian figure skater. She competed in ice dancing with her cousin Danny Moir. They are the 2001 Canadian national junior silver medalists and placed 11th at the 2001 World Junior Figure Skating Championships. They competed for two seasons on the Junior Grand Prix and placed 11th at the 2001 Nebelhorn Trophy.

Following her ice dancing career, Moir switched to synchronized skating. She competes on Canada's NEXXICE team, who won the bronze medal at the 2007 World Synchronized Skating Championships.

Moir was born in London, Ontario. She is the cousin of Scott Moir.
