= Christina Carreira =

American ice dancer (born 2000)

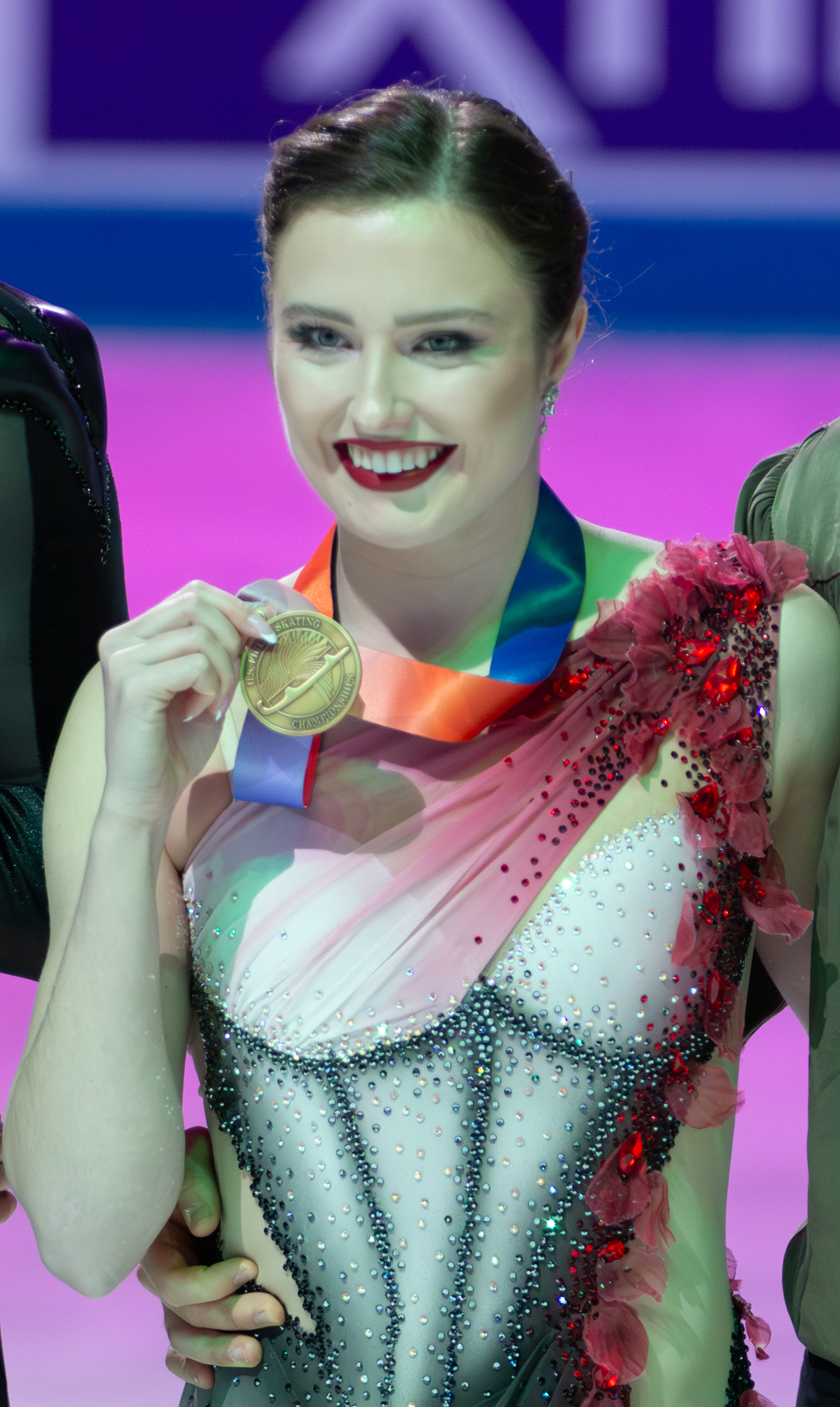
- Christina Carreira during the medal ceremony at the 2026 U.S. Championships

Personal information
- Born: April 3, 2000 (age 26) Montreal, Quebec, Canada
- Home town: St. Clair, Michigan, United States
- Height: 5 ft 5 in (1.66 m)

Figure skating career
- Country: United States
- Discipline: Ice dance
- Partner: Anthony Ponomarenko (since 2014); Simon-Pierre Malette-Paquette (2006–13)
- Coach: Scott Moir; Madison Hubbell; Adrián Díaz; Patrice Lauzon
- Skating club: Skating Club of New York
- Began skating: 2003

Medal record
Representing United States
Four Continents Championships
Bronze medal – third place	2022 Tallinn	Ice dance
Bronze medal – third place	2024 Shanghai	Ice dance
U.S. Championships
Silver medal – second place	2024 Columbus	Ice dance
Silver medal – second place	2025 Wichita	Ice dance
Bronze medal – third place	2023 San Jose	Ice dance
Bronze medal – third place	2026 St. Louis	Ice dance
World Junior Championships
Silver medal – second place	2018 Sofia	Ice dance
Bronze medal – third place	2017 Taipei	Ice dance
Junior Grand Prix Final
Silver medal – second place	2017–18 Nagoya	Ice dance

Christina Carreira (born April 3, 2000) is a Canadian-American ice dancer who competes for the United States. With her skating partner, Anthony Ponomarenko, she is a two-time Four Continents bronze medalist (2022, 2024), five-time ISU Grand Prix medalist (one silver, four bronzes), twelve-time medalist in the ISU Challenger Series (five golds, five silvers, two bronzes), and a five-time U.S. national medalist. She represented the United States at the 2026 Winter Olympics.

They are also two-time World Junior medalists (silver in 2018, bronze in 2017), the 2017 JGP Final silver medalists, and the 2018 U.S. national junior champions.

== Personal life ==
Carreira was born on April 3, 2000, in Montreal, Quebec, Canada. Born with two dislocated hips, her family was told that she would never run or play sports. French is her first language. In spring 2013, she moved to Novi, Michigan, United States.

In May 2018, Carreira filed a petition to be deemed an "alien with extraordinary ability", which would allow her to apply for permanent residence. The petition was denied in August, the decision asserting that her awards "were not directly awarded to you. They were awarded for your performance as part of a sports team...[W]e do not consider such honors to be a nationally or internationally recognized prize or award for excellence in the field of endeavor because it is limited to members of that association and participants of those competitions." She filed a lawsuit in October, describing the conclusions as "entirely irrational". Carreira dropped the lawsuit in early 2019.

Carreira received her American green card in August 2020. In November 2025, she obtained U.S. citizenship.

== Career ==
=== Early years ===
Carreira began learning to skate in 2003. Her first coach was Yvan Desjardins. She competed with Simon-Pierre Malette-Paquette from 2006 until 2013. The duo won sectional titles from the juvenile level through novice. Representing Quebec, they became the 2012 national champions at the pre-novice level. They placed fifth in the novice ranks at the 2013 Canadian Championships.

=== Partnership with Ponomarenko ===
==== 2014–2015 season: Junior international debut ====
In April 2014, Carreira teamed up with American ice dancer Anthony Ponomarenko. The two decided to represent the United States. It was Ponomarenko's mother, Marina Klimova, who thought the team would eventually be a good match after seeing Carreira in Lake Placid, New York. Their Junior Grand Prix (JGP) debut came in September 2014; they placed fifth in Ostrava, Czech Republic, and then fourth in Tallinn, Estonia. They finished fifth in the junior event at the 2015 U.S. Championships.

==== 2015–2016 season: First Junior Grand Prix medal ====
Competing in the 2015 JGP series, Carreira/Ponomarenko placed fourth in Riga, Latvia, and then won the silver medal in Toruń, Poland. They received the pewter medal for fourth place at the 2016 U.S. Championships.

==== 2016–2017 season: World Junior bronze ====
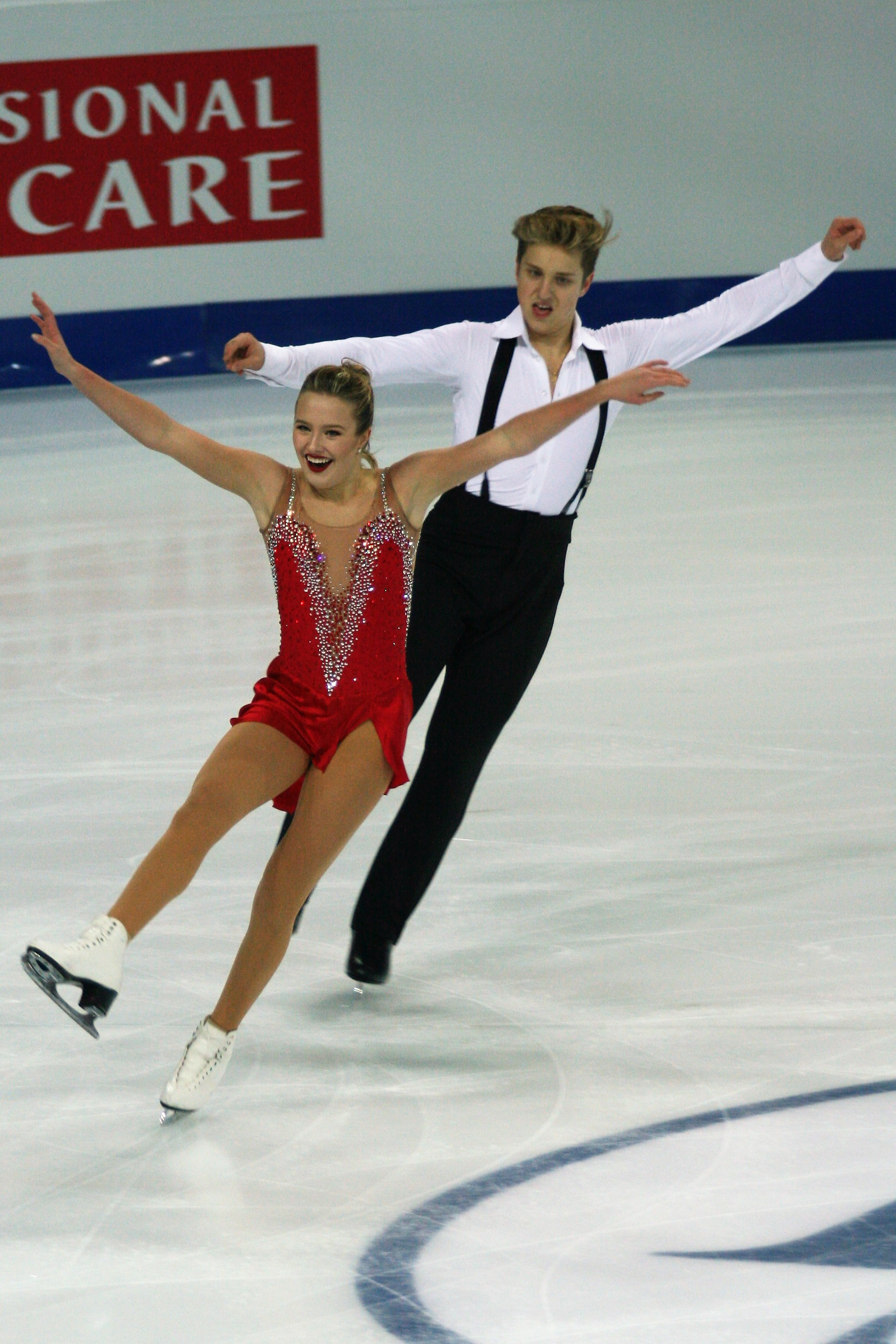
Carreira/Ponomarenko at the 2016–17 Junior Grand Prix Final

Carreira/Ponomarenko won silver medals at both of their JGP events and finished fourth at the JGP Final, held in December in Marseille, France. In January, they took the silver medal at the 2017 U.S. Championships, having placed third in the short and second in the free. Ranked sixth in the short and third in the free, they won the bronze medal at the 2017 World Junior Championships, which took place in March in Taipei, Taiwan.

==== 2017–2018 season: World Junior silver and Junior Grand Prix Final silver ====
Winning gold at both of their JGP assignments, in addition to the Lake Placid Ice Dance International, Carreira/Ponomarenko capped off 2017 with a second-place finish and won silver at the JGP Final, held in December in Nagoya, Japan. The following month they became the new US junior champions at the 2018 U.S. Figure Skating Championships. In March, they won silver at the 2018 World Junior Championships.

==== 2018–2019 season: Senior debut and first Grand Prix medal ====
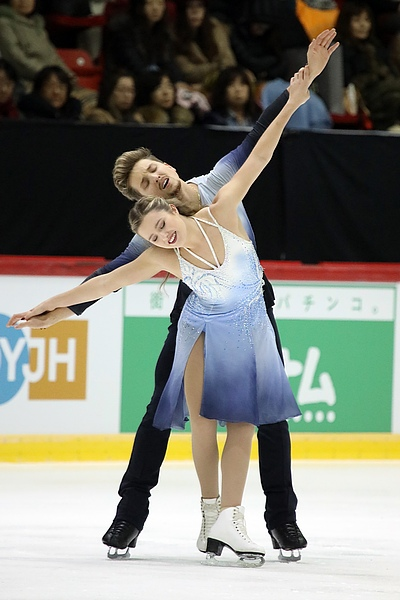
Carreira/Ponomarenko at the 2018 Grand Prix of Helsinki

Pasquale Camerlengo joined their coaching team ahead of the 2018–2019 season. Making their senior international debut, Carreira/Ponomarenko achieved silver at the 2018 CS U.S. Classic in Salt Lake City, having finished second to Hubbell/Donohue. They won the bronze medal at the 2018 CS Nebelhorn Trophy. For their Grand Prix debut, Carreira/Ponomarenko finished fifth at the 2018 Grand Prix of Helsinki. At their second assignment, they won the bronze medal at the 2018 Rostelecom Cup. Following the conclusion of the Grand Prix, they won the gold medal at the 2018 CS Tallinn Trophy.

Carreira/Ponomarenko concluded their season at the 2019 U.S. Championships, where they placed fifth.

==== 2019–2020 season ====
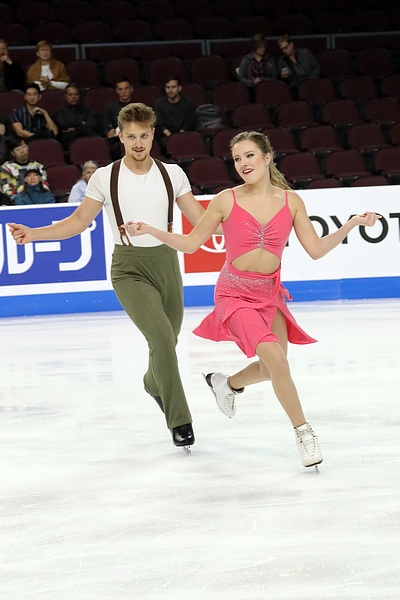
Carreira/Ponomarenko at 2019 Skate America

Beginning on the Challenger series, Carreira/Ponomarenko won silver for the second consecutive U.S. Classic and a second bronze medal at Nebelhorn Trophy. They won gold at their final Challenger event in November, the Asian Open Trophy, having finished first in both segments.

At their first Grand Prix, the 2019 Skate America, they placed sixth in the rhythm dance after errors on their twizzles. Carreira remarked it was "probably the worst time we have ever performed" the program. They remained in sixth place after the free dance, which Ponomarenko called "redeeming." At their second GP event, the 2019 NHK Trophy, they finished fifth in the rhythm dance, but a lift error in the free dance placed them in seventh in the free and sixth overall.

Carreira/Ponomarenko placed fourth in the rhythm dance at the 2020 U.S. Championships. Fourth in the free dance as well, they would have placed third in that segment but for the invalidation of their choreographic character step sequence due to a violation of the distance requirement. Taking the pewter medal, they stood on the senior national podium for the first time in their careers.

==== 2020–2021 season: Coaching move and second Grand Prix medal ====
Carreira broke her foot during the spring quarantine period in response to the COVID-19 pandemic, though she had recovered by the time the rink reopened in the summer. With the pandemic affecting international travel, Carreira/Ponomarenko were assigned to compete at the 2020 Skate America, attended mainly by dance teams training in the United States. They won the bronze medal.

On January 10, it was announced that they had withdrawn from the 2021 U.S. Championships. Carreira confirmed it was a positive COVID test of a rink mate that caused their withdrawal.

On January 27, Carreira announced on Instagram that she and Ponomarenko would be departing their longtime coach Igor Shpilband. Two weeks later, U.S. Figure Skating announced that Carreira and Ponomarenko would be moving to train at the Ice Academy of Montreal's new Ontario campus in London, Ontario, coached by former Olympic champion Scott Moir.

==== 2021–2022 season: Four Continents bronze ====
Carreira/Ponomarenko began their season at the 2021 CS Lombardia Trophy, where they placed fourth. They were eighth at the 2021 CS Finlandia Trophy.

On the Grand Prix, Carreira/Ponomarenko placed eighth at the 2021 Skate Canada International. They were fourth after the rhythm dance at the 2021 Internationaux de France, but dropped to fifth overall with a seventh-place free dance after an extended lift deduction.

At the 2022 U.S. Championships, Carreira/Ponomarenko were fifth in the rhythm dance but fell to seventh place after the free dance. They were named to the team for the Four Continents Championships in Tallinn later in January. Third in both segments, they won the bronze medal in their first appearance at a senior championship event. Carreira said they were "happy we're able to end our season with our best free dance, I think. So yes, we're overall really happy, and we want to continue growing into the next quad."

==== 2022–2023 season: World Championships debut ====
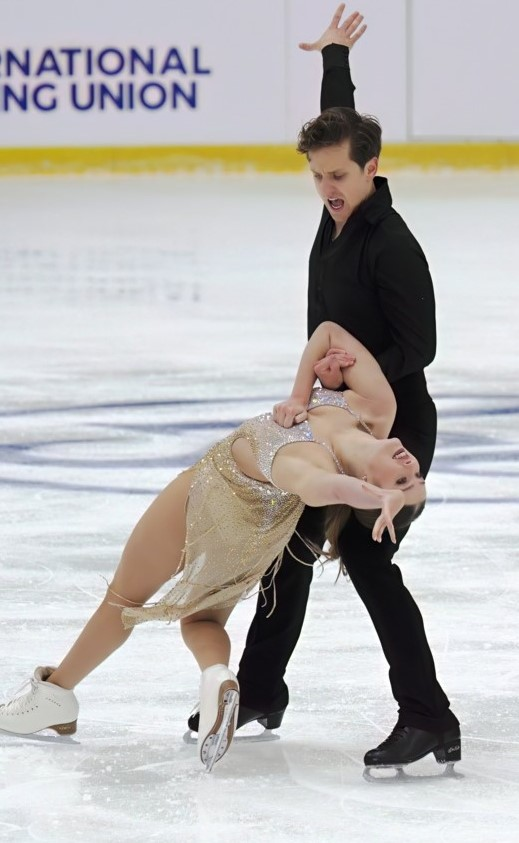
Carreira and Ponomarenko performing their rhythm at the 2022 MK John Wilson Trophy

Following the conclusion of the 2021–22 season, Ponomarenko required ankle surgery, which delayed their preparations for the coming season. He revealed that he had been suffering ongoing ankle pain since "severely" spraining it in 2015 and developing joint damage. After years of skating through the pain, it had reached the point where "every opinion I heard was: 'Get the surgery.' Since the Olympic quad was over, this was the time to get the surgery done to make sure I'm fully ready for the next four years." While Ponomarenko spent three months recuperating in Colorado Springs, Carreira continued training by herself in London. When they resumed working together in May, retired ice dancers Madison Hubbell and Adrián Díaz joined their coaching team.

Foregoing the Challenger series to start the season, Carreira and Ponomarenko made their season debut on the Grand Prix at the 2022 MK John Wilson Trophy in Sheffield. They placed fourth in both segments and fourth overall, 11.53 points back of Canadian bronze medalists Lajoie/Lagha, their former junior rivals. At the 2022 Grand Prix of Espoo, Carreira/Ponomarenko were third in the rhythm dance, 1.14 points clear of home team Turkkila/Versluis, and described themselves as "really happy with the performances." In the free dance, they slipped to fourth in that segment and fourth overall, being overtaken by the Finns for the bronze medal.

Following the Grand Prix, Carreira/Ponomarenko made a belated Challenger appearance, winning gold at the 2022 CS Golden Spin of Zagreb. With presumptive national silver medalists Hawayek/Baker sitting out the 2023 U.S. Championships for health reasons, the national podium was more open than would otherwise have been the case. Considered likely bronze medalists going in, Carreira/Ponomarenko unexpectedly placed fourth in the rhythm dance due to a twizzle error. In the free dance they overtook new team Zingas/Kolesnik for the bronze medal.

As national bronze medalists, they were named to the 2023 Four Continents Championship team, and also as first alternates for the 2023 World Championships, the third berth there having been given to Hawayek/Baker. They placed fourth in the rhythm dance at Four Continents, 2.07 points back of third-place Lajoie/Lagha. Fifth in the free dance, they remained in fourth place, beating domestic rivals Green/Parsons.

On February 24, it was announced that Hawayek/Baker had withdrawn from the World Championships due to continued health problems. As first alternates, Carreira/Ponomarenko were called up to make their Worlds debut. They finished tenth.

==== 2023–2024 season: Second Four Continents bronze and national silver ====
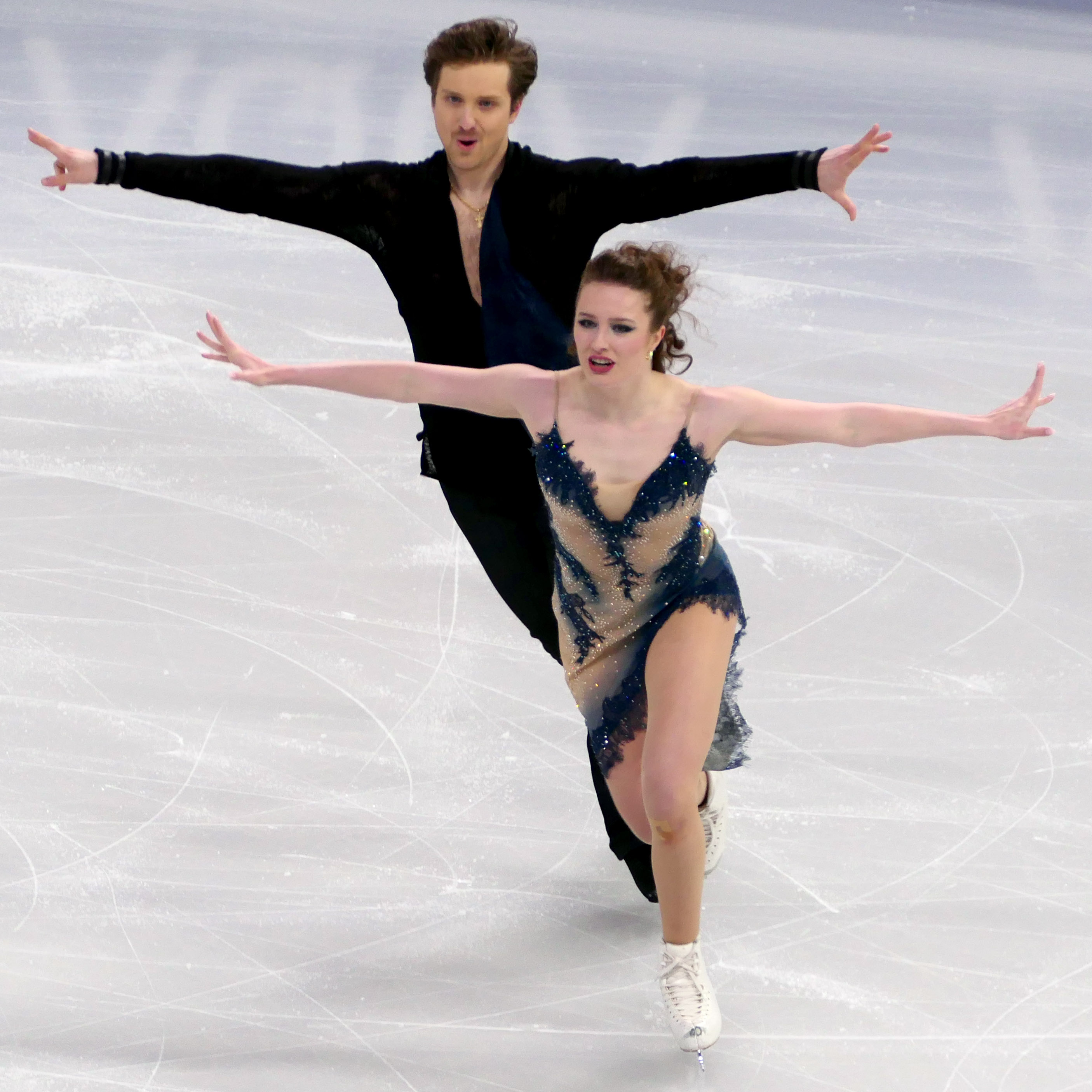
Carreira/Ponomarenko during their rhythm dance at the 2024 World Championships

For the first time since the onset of the pandemic, Carreira and Ponomarenko had the entire offseason for training and other upgrades, which in this case included new equipment, nutritional plans, and athletic trainers. Starting the season at the 2023 CS Nebelhorn Trophy, Carreira/Ponomarenko came fourth, before winning the silver medal at the 2023 CS Finlandia Trophy. On the Grand Prix, they came fourth at the 2023 Grand Prix de France. Carreira said that despite some technical errors, "we put out two solid performances this weekend that we are proud of." They followed this with a fourth-place finish at the 2023 Grand Prix of Espoo.

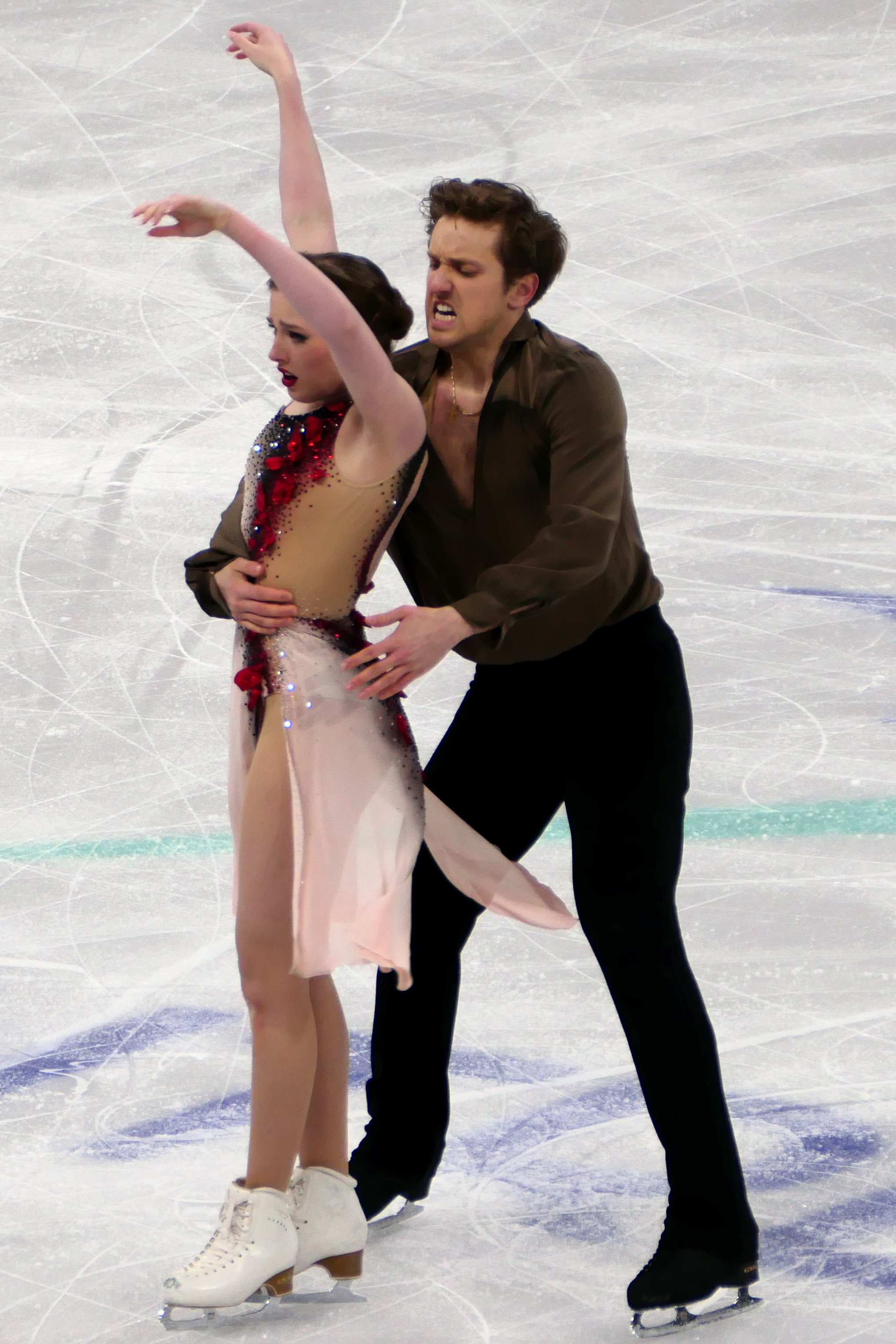
Carreira and Ponomarenko during their free dance at the 2024 World Championships

In advance of the 2024 U.S. Championships, Carreira/Ponomarenko were preemptively named to the American team for the 2024 Four Continents Championships in Shanghai, which was to take place the following weekend. At the national championships, the team finished second in the rhythm dance segment, before winning the free dance segment over a flu-stricken Chock/Bates; the latter remained in first place overall on the strength of their rhythm dance lead, and Carreira/Ponomarenko claimed the national silver medal for the first time. At the Four Continents Championships, they finished third in the rhythm dance. They were only fifth in the free dance after a twizzle error from Carreira, but remained third overall, 1.07 points clear of fellow American team Zingas/Kolesnik in fourth. Claiming their second championship bronze, Ponomarenko noted that they team had experienced much in the two years since their first, including "lows" relating to his ankle surgery, so "being back here and having these two years of growth with Christina and the rest of our coaching team, it's a big significant moment."

At the 2024 World Championships in Montreal, Quebec, Canada, Carreira/Ponomarenko finished a new high seventh overall with a total score of 200.32 points. Carreira said that hitting the 200-point mark had been a goal for the team "for a couple of years and it's of course great to have reached that."

==== 2024–2025 season: Two Grand Prix medals ====
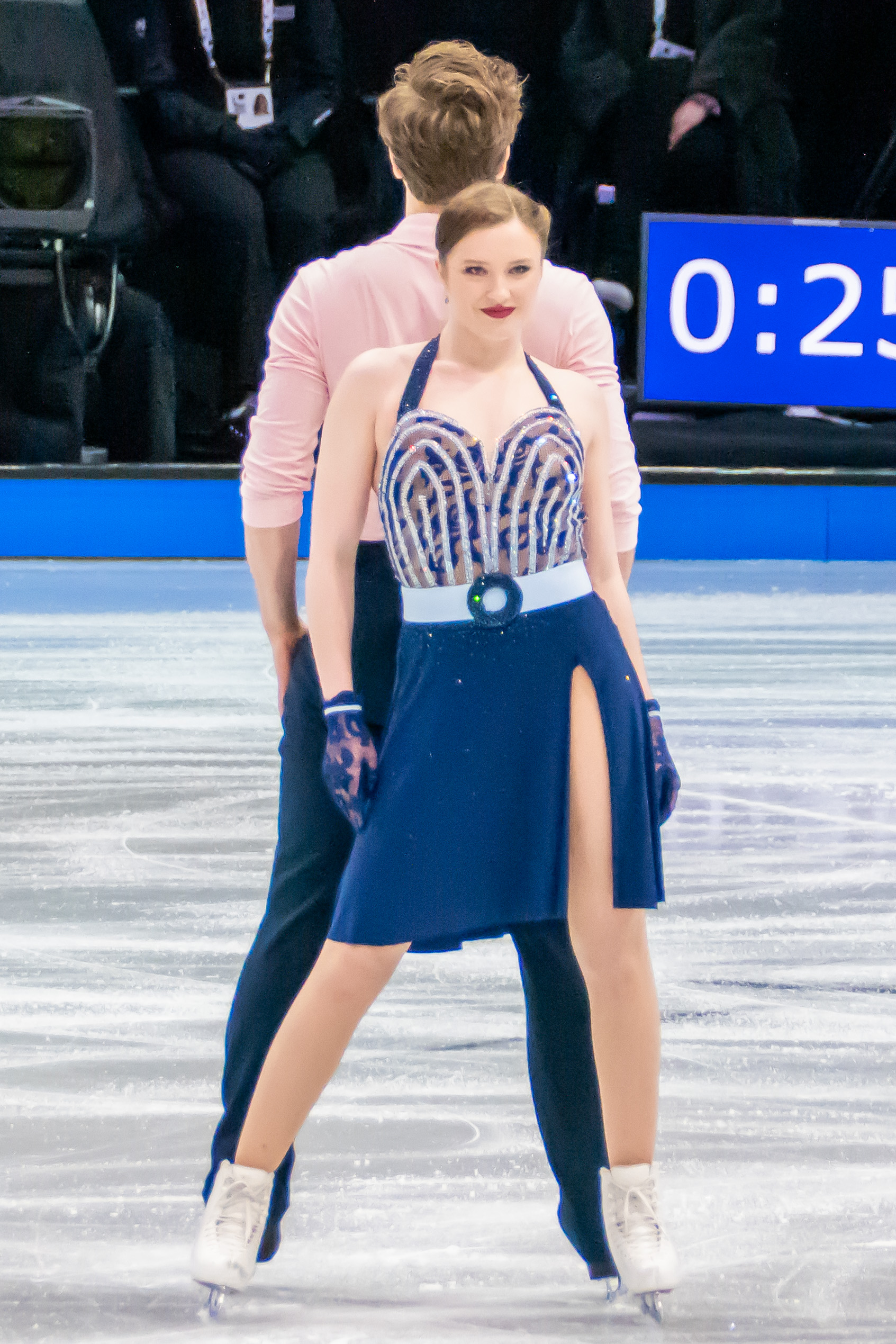
Carreira/Ponomarenko during their rhythm dance at the 2025 World Championships

Carreira/Ponomarenko began the season by competing on the 2024–25 ISU Challenger Series, winning silver at the 2024 CS Nebelhorn Trophy and gold at the 2024 CS Budapest Trophy. They then went on to compete on the 2024–25 Grand Prix circuit, and in their first event, the 2024 NHK Trophy, they won the silver medal, unexpectedly overtaking the higher-seeded Lithuanian team Reed/Ambrulevicius. Ponomarenko called reaching the podium "a testament of the hard work that we've put in the past few summers and seasons." This was their third Grand Prix medal, and their first at a "fully international" Grand Prix since 2018. They won the bronze medal at their second event, the 2024 Cup of China. With these results, they were designated as first alternates for the 2024–25 Grand Prix Final. Carreira would later say that this "gave us motivation for the second half of the season. We want to attack, and we want to prove that we're part of the top group."

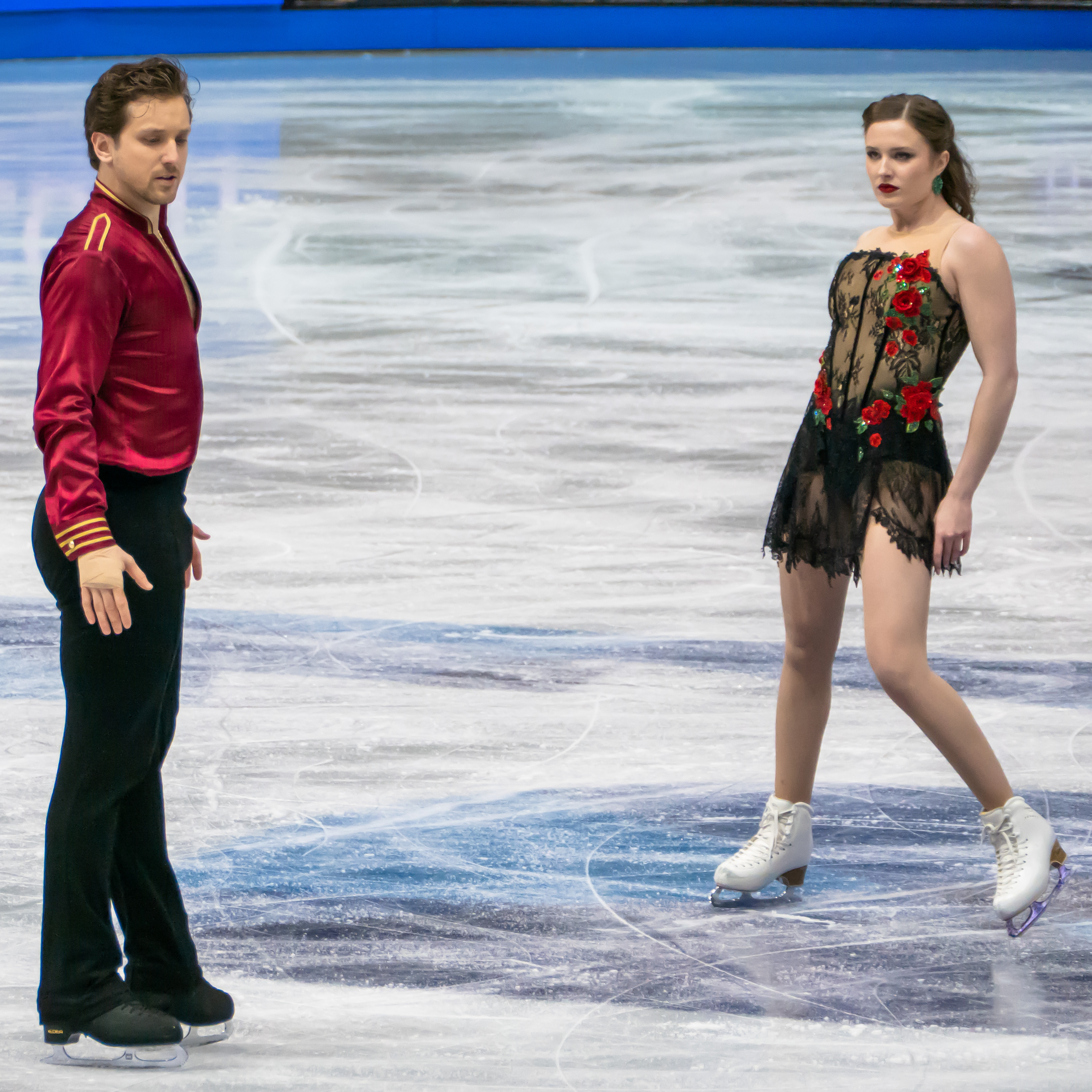
Carreira/Ponomarenko during their free dance at the 2025 World Championships

In advance of the 2025 U.S. Championships in Wichita, Carreira, Ponomarenko, and their coaches made revisions to their Carmen program, aiming for "a really refreshed look," which also included new costuming. Competing in Wichita, they finished second in both segments, claiming their second consecutive national silver medal, with Ponomarenko opining that they were skating "a step closer to what we can do in practice."

Assigned to both major ISU championships, Carreira/Ponomarenko came fourth at the 2025 Four Continents Championships in Seoul, South Korea, finishing 3.96 points behind Canadian bronze medalists Lajoie/Lagha.

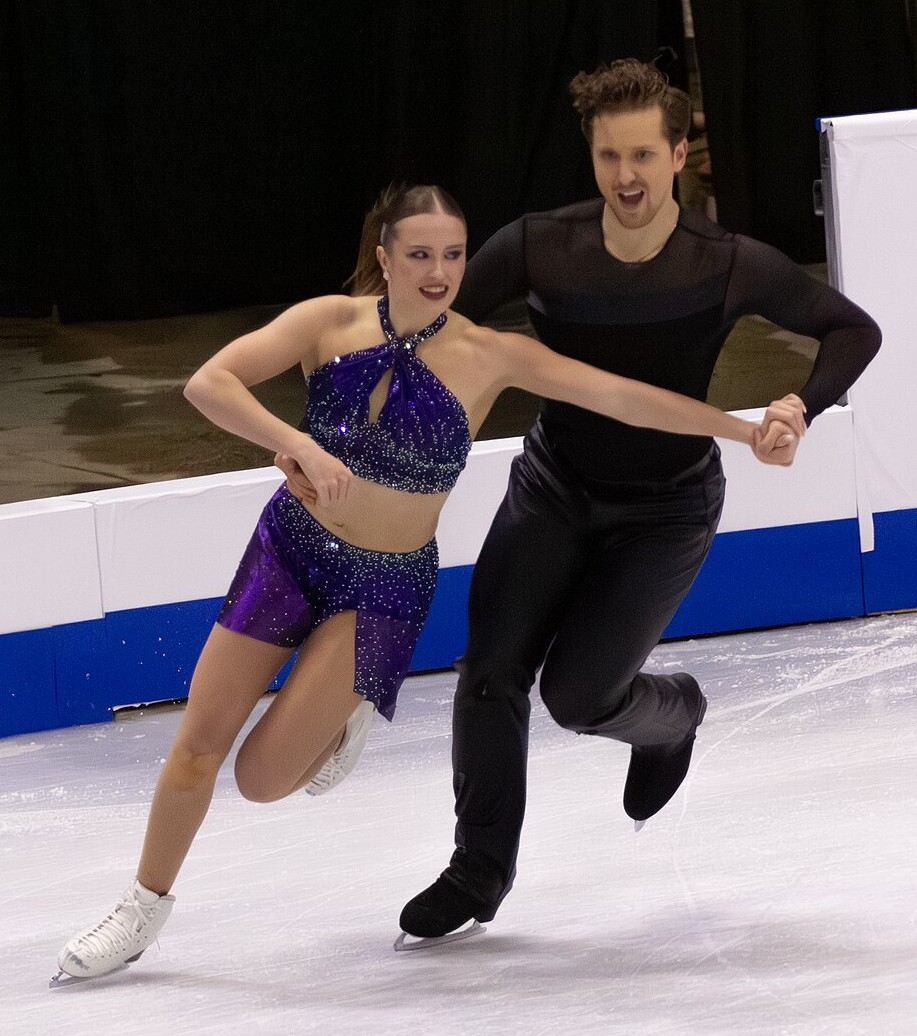
Carreira/Ponomarenko during their rhythm dance at 2025 Skate Canada International

At the 2025 World Championships, held on home ice in Boston, Massachusetts, United States, they came sixth in the rhythm dance, narrowly missing the final group of the free skate, with a score 0.26 points back of Lajoie/Lagha in fifth. Their 81.51 points was a new personal best. They came fifth in the free dance, rising to fifth overall, having overtaken Lajoie/Lagha and holding off the rising Spaniards Smart/Dieck, who were third in the segment.

==== 2025–2026 season: Milano Cortina Olympics ====
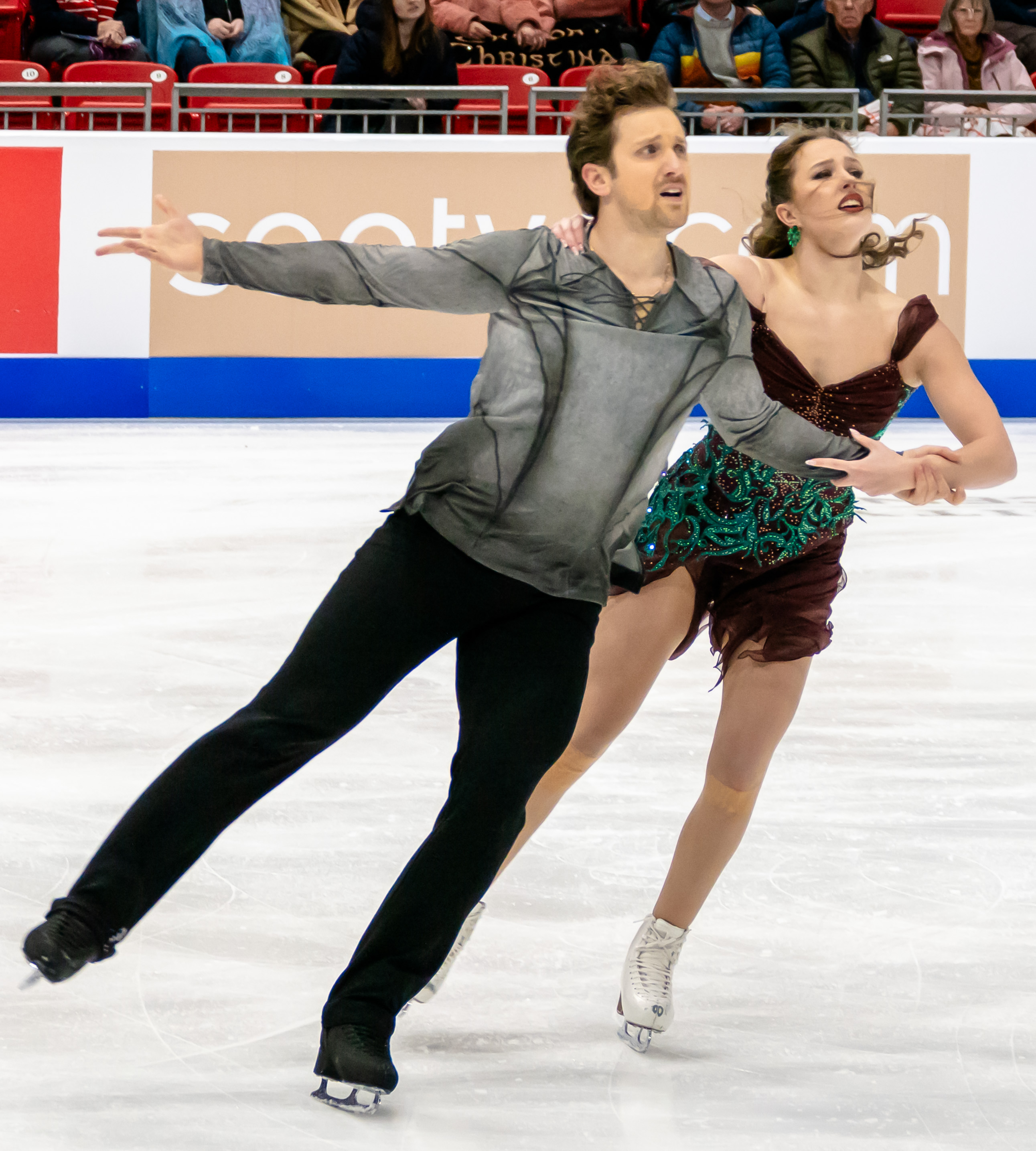
Carreira/Ponomarenko during their free dance at 2025 Skate America

Carreira/Ponomarenko opened their season by winning the silver medal at the 2025 CS Nebelhorn Trophy.They went on to compete on the 2025–26 Grand Prix series, placing fourth at 2025 Skate Canada International and fifth at 2025 Skate America.

Disappointed with the first half of the season, the team decided to change their free dance, opting to return to their Perfume: The Story of a Murderer program from 2023–24 season. Speaking on this decision, Carreira shared, "I feel like bringing Perfume back brought back a spark and confidence in us, and it's been working super well. We made some changes, but the essence of the program is still the same."

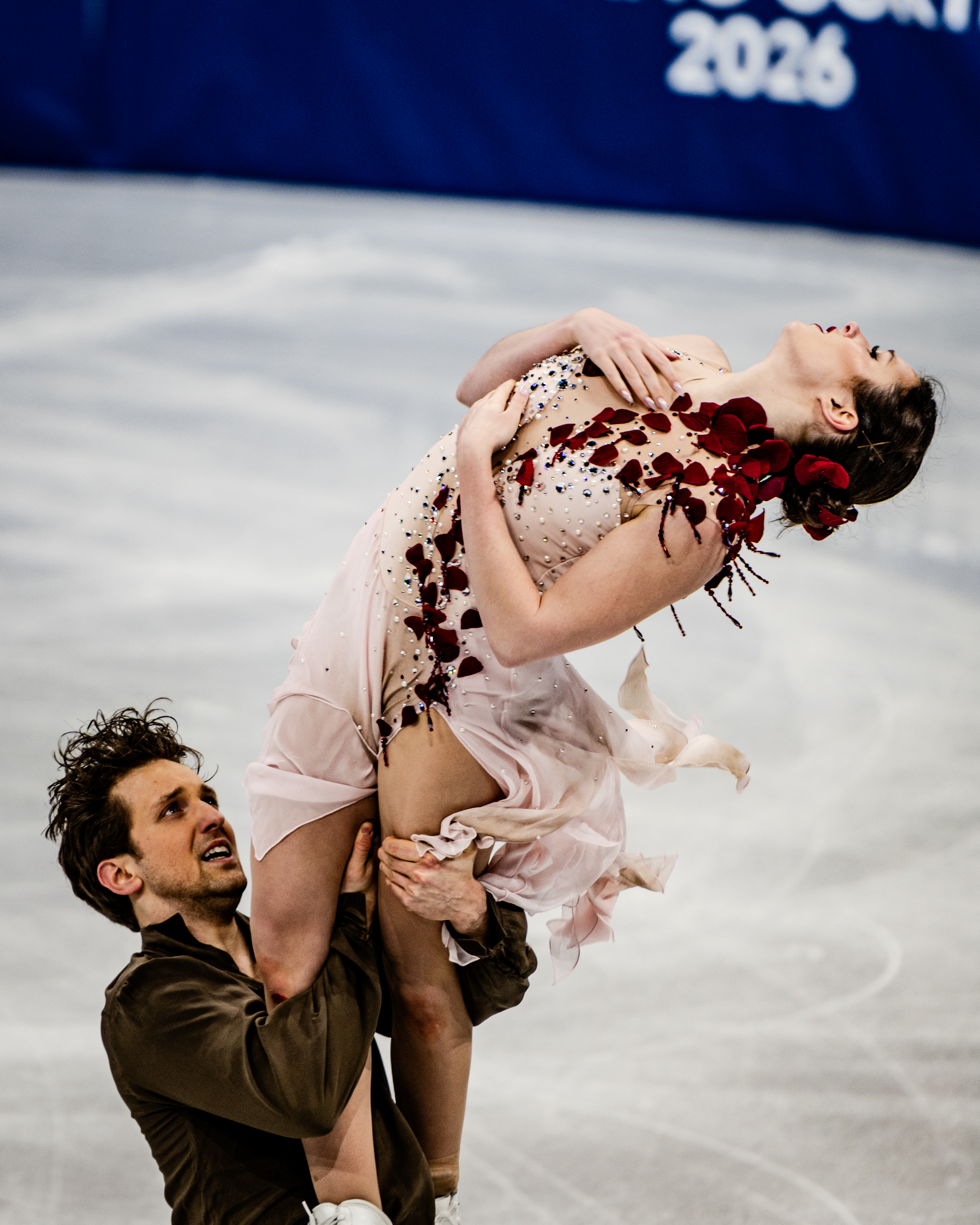
Carreira/Ponomarenko during a practice session at the 2026 Winter Olympics

In January, Carreira/Ponomarenko won the bronze medal at the 2026 U.S. Championships behind Chock/Bates and Zingas/Kolesnik. "It means everything for us to be standing here," said Carreira. "It’s such an honor to be standing with these teams. Everyone here is so talented and we’re just really proud. We had a bit of a rocky start to this season but I’m happy that we kind of got our act together after the Grand Prix, and we were able to deliver good performances here." They were subsequently named to the 2026 Winter Olympic team.

On 9 February, Carreira/Ponomarenko placed eleventh in the rhythm dance segment at the 2026 Winter Olympics, scoring a season's best in the process. "We felt very good," said Carreira following their performance. "We had a lot of fun. We kind of went in there with the approach that we had nothing to lose, and I think that definitely worked in our favor. Honestly, I think this is the best we’ve skated this program this season." Ponomarenko added, "We’re here to gain experience. We’re still very new to ice dance regarding age, so we’re really just here for the experience and to feel good being here. It was a lot of fun."

Two days later, the team competed in the free dance segment in which they placed tenth and remained in eleventh place overall, all while scoring season best free dance and combined total score. "It's been incredible," expressed Carreira after their performance. "We're so happy with the two skates we put out, and we've been working really hard, and it was nice to feel like that hard work paid off." "I think the pressure cooker that is the Olympics, there's a year in the spotlight," Ponomarenko further remarked. "There's so much stress involved to compete on a big stage. We're going to take that experience and take it in the next few seasons. I think we've grown as athletes just in these last few weeks, and it feels nice."

The team also competed at the 2026 World Figure Skating Championships, held in Prague, Czech Republic. On 27 March, they skated in the rhythm dance. With a score of 80.89, they placed 7th. The next day, they skated in the free dance. In that skate alone, they placed 8th, with a score of 119.67. The program received a mandatory one point deduction for a rose petal that fell off of Christina's dress and hit the ice. This is an ISU issued rule for all ice dance teams. This did not affect their free dance placement. Overall, they placed 8th. Each of these events scored a season's best for the team.

==== 2026–2027 season: Grand Prix Medal ====
Carreira/Ponomarenko opened their season by winning the 2026 Nebelhorn Trophy in September. They went on to earn a bronze medal at 2026 Grand Prix de France.“We can definitely improve our speed,” said Carreira after the free dance. “The elements feel much freer when we’re skating faster. We also left some technical points on the table, so we’ll review that.”

== Programs ==
=== Ice dance with Anthony Ponomarenko ===
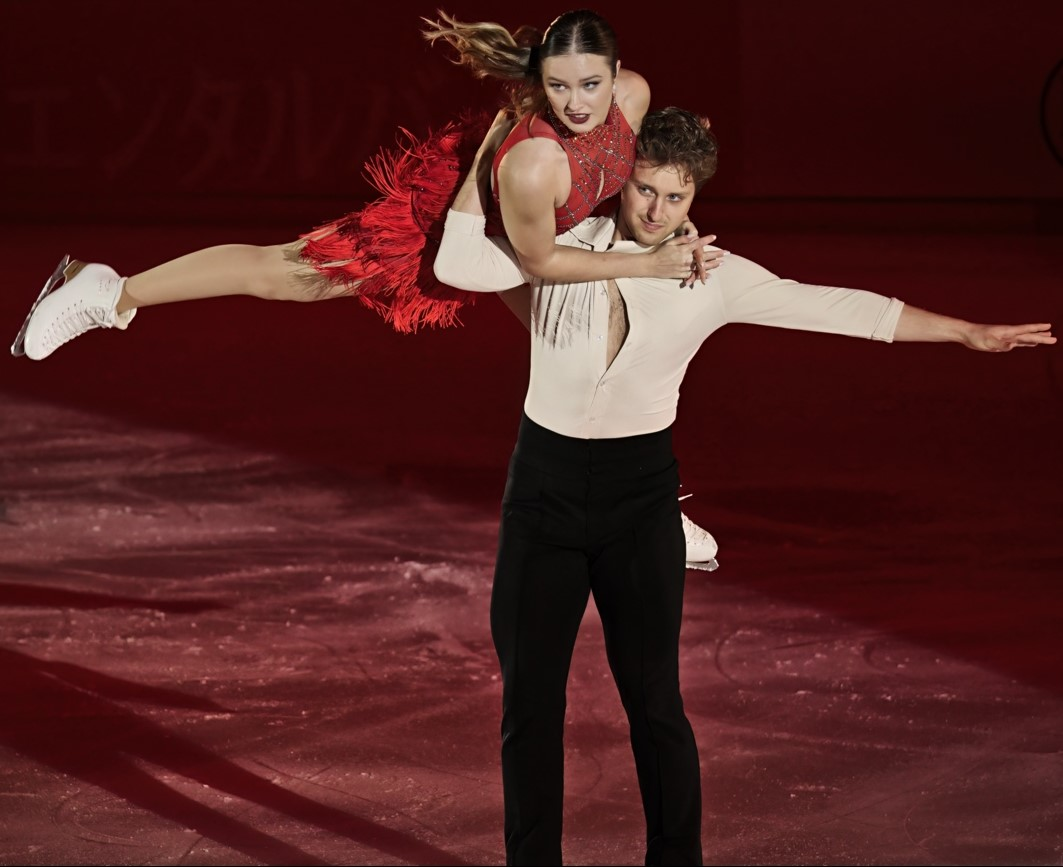
Carreira and Ponomarenko performing during the gala exhibition at the 2022 MK John Wilson Trophy

Season	Short dance/Rhythm dance	Free dance	Exhibition	Ref.
2014–15	Samba: "Chic a boom"; Samba: "Let's Get Loud" By Jennifer Lopez Choreo. By Igor Shpilband	Micmacs By Raphaël Beau & Max Steiner; "Diabolic"; "A Motley Crew"; "It is Rolling" Choreo. By Igor Shpilband	—N/a	
2015–16	Waltz & polka: City Lights By Charlie Chaplin Choreo. By Igor Shpilband	"Poursuit"; "Auscencia"; "Black Cat, White Cat" All by Goran Bregović Choreo. By Igor Shpilband	—N/a	
2016–17	Blues: "Why Don't You Do Right?" (from Who Framed Roger Rabbit); Swing: "Cool Cat in Town" By Tape Five Choreo. By Igor Shpilband	"Exogenesis: Symphony" Part 3 (Redemption) By Muse Choreo. By Igor Shpilband	Exogenesis: Symphony Part 3 (Redemption)	
2017–18	Rhumba: "Quizás, Quizás, Quizás" Performed by Sara Montiel; Cha-cha: "Perhaps, Perhaps, Perhaps" Performed by The Pussycat Dolls; Samba: "Conga" By Gloria Estefan Choreo. By Igor Shpilband	W.E. By Abel Korzeniowski; "Dance for Me, Wallis"; "Abdication" Choreo. By Igor Shpilband	Exogenesis: Symphony Part 3 (Redemption)	
2018–19	Tango Romantica: "Jalousie 'Tango Tzigane'" By Jacob Gade Performed by Katica Illenyi; Tango Romantica: "Yo soy María" (from María de Buenos Aires) By Astor Piazzolla Choreo. By Igor Shpilband & Pasquale Camerlengo	Tokio Myers medley; "Bloodstream"; "Angel" Choreo. By Igor Shpilband & Pasquale Camerlengo	"Latch" (acoustic) By Disclosure Performed by Sam Smith	
2019–20	Quickstep: "Too Darn Hot" (from Kiss Me, Kate) By Cole Porter Choreo. By Igor Shpilband & Pasquale Camerlengo	"Farrucas" By Pepe Romero; "Malagueña" By Ernesto Lecuona Performed by Roni Benise Choreo. By Igor Shpilband & Pasquale Camerlengo	María de Buenos Aires By Astor Piazzolla	
2020–21	Quickstep: "Too Darn Hot" (from Kiss Me, Kate) By Cole Porter Choreo. By Igor Shpilband & Pasquale Camerlengo	Doctor Zhivago; "Main Title" By Maurice Jarre; "Farewell to the Past" By Ludovico Einaudi; "Lara's Theme" By Maurice Jarre; "Love is a Mystery" By Ludovico Einaudi Choreo. By Igor Shpilband & Pasquale Camerlengo	—N/a	
2021–22	"Batdance" By Prince Choreo. By Marie-France Dubreuil & Romain Haguenauer	"Wicked Game" By Chris Isaak Performed by Daisy Gray & Yola Recoba Choreo. By Marie-France Dubreuil & Romain Haguenauer	—N/a	
2022–23	Samba: "Kind of Latin Rhythm" By The JuJu Orchestra; Rhumba: "(Where Do I Begin?) Love Story" By Francis Lai & Carl Sigman Performed by Shirley Bassey; Samba: "Samba" (Brazil305 remix) by Gloria Estefan Choreo. by Marie-France Dubreuil, Madison Hubbell & Adrián Díaz	"Rainy Streets"; "Public Disquiet" (from Backbone) By Danshin & Arooj; "Summertime" (from Porgy and Bess) By George Gershwin Performed by Louis Armstrong & Ella Fitzgerald; "Summertime" Performed by 101 Strings Orchestra Choreo. by Marie-France Dubreuil, Madison Hubbell & Adrián Díaz	"Suspicious Minds"; "Craw-Fever" By Elvis Presley	
2023–24	"Whole Lotta Trouble"; "Edge of Seventeen" All by Stevie Nicks Choreo. by Marie-France Dubreuil, Scott Moir, Madison Hubbell & Adrián Díaz	"The Girl With The Plums" (from Perfume: The Story of a Murderer) By Tom Tykwer, Johnny Klimek & Reinhold Heil; "Strictly Taboo"; "Deceit and Betrayal" By Audiomachine; "Meeting Laura" (from Perfume: The Story of a Murderer) by Tom Tykwer, Johnny Klimek & Reinhold Heil Choreo. by Marie-France Dubreuil, Scott Moir, Madison Hubbell & Adrián Díaz	"Suspicious Minds"; "Craw-Fever" By Elvis Presley	
2024–25	"I Just Want to Make Love to You" By Etta James; "Long Tall Sally" By Little Richard Choreo. by Madison Hubbell, Adrián Díaz, Scott Moir & Marie-France Dubreuil	Carmen Suite By Rodion Shchedrin Choreo. by Madison Hubbell, Adrián Díaz, Scott Moir & Marie-France Dubreuil	I Just Want to Make Love to You; Long Tall Sally; "Can't Help Falling in Love" By Elvis Presley Performed by Tommee Profitt feat. Brooke; Cold by Chris Stapleton	
2025–26	"Sweet Dreams" By La Bouche Performed by La Bouche & Paolo Pellegrino; "100% Pure Love" By Crystal Waters & The Basement Boys Choreo. by Scott Moir, Madison Hubbell, Adrián Díaz & Marie-France Dubreuil	Notre-Dame de Paris By Riccardo Cocciante & Luc Plamondon; "Ave Maria païen" Performed by Noa; "La cour des miracles" Performed by Luck Mervil & Hélène Ségara; "Le temps des cathédrales" Performed by I Fiamminghi; "Danse, mon Esmeralda" Performed by Garou Choreo. by Scott Moir, Madison Hubbell, Adrián Díaz & Marie-France Dubreuil; Perfume: The Story of a Murderer	Cold	
2026–27	"I Could've Danced All Night"; "Embassy Waltz" (from My Fair Lady) By Frederick Loewe; "Sing, Sing, Sing" By Louis Prima Choreo. by Marie-France Dubreuil, Scott Moir, Madison Hubbell & Adrián Díaz	"Élégie: Ô doux printemps d'autrefois" By Louis Gallet; Manon By Leighton Lucas Choreo. by Marie-France Dubreuil, Scott Moir, Madison Hubbell & Adrián Díaz	Say It Right; Maneater by Nelly Furtado	

== Competitive highlights ==
- GP – Event of the ISU Grand Prix Series
- JGP – Event of the ISU Junior Grand Prix Series
- CS – Event of the ISU Challenger Series
- TBD – Assigned
- WD – Withdrew from competition

=== Ice dance with Anthony Ponomarenko ===
Competition placements at senior level
Season	2018–19	2019–20	2020–21	2021–22	2022–23	2023–24	2024–25	2025–26	2026–27
Winter Olympics								11th	
World Championships					10th	7th	5th	8th	
Four Continents Championships				3rd	4th	3rd	4th		
U.S. Championships	5th	4th		7th	3rd	2nd	2nd	3rd	
GP Cup of China							3rd		
GP Finland	5th				4th	4th			
GP France				5th		4th			3rd
GP NHK Trophy		6th					2nd		TBD
GP Rostelecom Cup	3rd								
GP Skate Canada				8th				4th	
GP Skate America		6th	3rd					5th	
GP Wilson Trophy					4th				
CS Asian Open Trophy		1st							
CS Budapest Trophy							1st		
CS Finlandia Trophy				8th		2nd			
CS Golden Spin of Zagreb					1st				
CS Lombardia Trophy				4th					
CS Nebelhorn Trophy	3rd	3rd				4th	2nd	2nd	1st
CS Tallinn Trophy	1st								
CS U.S. Classic	2nd	2nd							
Lake Placid Ice Dance		2nd							

Competition placements at junior level
Season	2014–15	2015–16	2016–17	2017–18
World Junior Championships			3rd	2nd
Junior Grand Prix Final			4th	2nd
U.S. Championships	5th	4th	2nd	1st
JGP Austria				1st
JGP Belarus				1st
JGP Czech Republic	5th			
JGP Estonia	4th			
JGP France			2nd	
JGP Latvia		4th		
JGP Poland		2nd		
JGP Russia			2nd	
Lake Placid Ice Dance		2nd		1st

== Detailed results ==
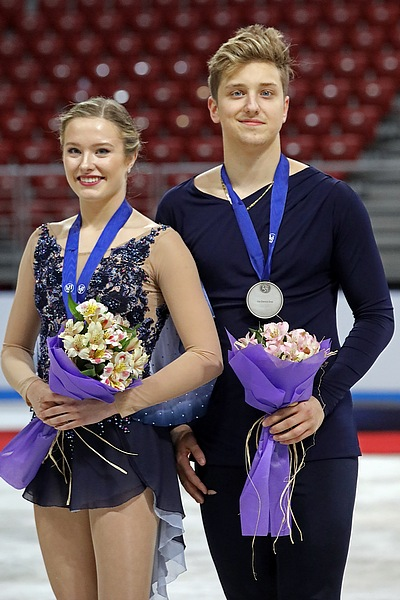
Carreira/Ponomarenko at the 2018 World Junior Championships

=== Ice dance with Anthony Ponomarenko ===
ISU personal best scores in the +5/-5 GOE System
Segment	Type	Score	Event
Total	TSS	204.88	2025 World Championships
Rhythm dance	TSS	81.51	2025 World Championships
Rhythm dance	TES	46.99	2025 World Championships
Rhythm dance	PCS	34.43	2025 World Championships
Free dance	TSS	123.37	2025 World Championships
Free dance	TES	70.09	2025 World Championships
Free dance	PCS	53.28	2025 World Championships

ISU personal bests in the +3/-3 GOE System (from 2010–11)
Segment	Type	Score	Event
Total	TSS	157.19	2016 JGP Russia
Short dance	TSS	64.10	2017–18 Junior Grand Prix Final
Short dance	TES	33.25	2017 JGP Belarus
Short dance	PCS	31.51	2017–18 Junior Grand Prix Final
Free dance	TSS	94.15	2017 World Junior Championships
Free dance	TES	46.11	2017 World Junior Championships
Free dance	PCS	48.47	2018 World Junior Championships

- Small medals for the short program and free skating are only awarded at ISU Championships.
- At national events in the United States, pewter medals are awarded for fourth place.

==== Senior level ====
Results in the 2018–19 season
Date	Event	RD		FD		Total	
Date	Event	P	Score	P	Score	P	Score
Sep 12–16, 2018	(United States) 2018 CS U.S. International Classic	2	68.61	2	105.43	2	174.04
Sep 26–29, 2018	(Germany) 2018 CS Nebelhorn Trophy	3	69.56	3	107.93	3	177.49
Nov 2–4, 2018	(Finland) 2018 Grand Prix of Helsinki	4	66.93	5	100.35	5	167.28
Nov 16–18, 2018	(Russia) 2018 Rostelecom Cup	2	69.01	3	105.20	3	174.21
Nov 26 – Dec 2, 2018	(Estonia) 2018 CS Tallinn Trophy	2	69.58	1	110.64	1	180.22
Jan 19–27, 2019	(United States) 2019 U.S. Championships	4	75.23	5	114.78	5	190.01

Results in the 2019–20 season
Date	Event	RD		FD		Total	
Date	Event	P	Score	P	Score	P	Score
Jul 30 – Aug 2, 2019	(United States) 2019 Lake Placid Ice Dance	2	72.57	2	105.15	2	177.72
Sep 17–22, 2019	(United States) 2019 CS U.S. International Classic	2	77.18	2	111.29	2	188.47
Sep 25–28, 2019	(Germany) 2019 CS Nebelhorn Trophy	2	76.99	4	113.43	3	190.35
Oct 18–20, 2019	(United States) 2019 Skate America	6	70.41	6	110.14	6	180.55
Oct 30 – Nov 3, 2019	(China) 2019 CS Asian Open Trophy	1	78.40	1	113.15	1	191.55
Nov 22–24, 2019	(Japan) 2019 NHK Trophy	5	75.25	7	107.01	6	182.26
Jan 20–26, 2020	(United States) 2020 U.S. Championships	4	78.02	4	116.14	4	194.16

Results in the 2020–21 season
Date	Event	RD		FD		Total	
Date	Event	P	Score	P	Score	P	Score
Oct 23–24, 2020	(United States) 2020 Skate America	3	78.63	3	107.15	3	185.78

Results in the 2021–22 season
Date	Event	RD		FD		Total	
Date	Event	P	Score	P	Score	P	Score
Sep 10–12, 2021	(Italy) 2021 CS Lombardia Trophy	4	69.08	6	103.70	4	172.78
Oct 7–10, 2021	(Finland) 2021 CS Finlandia Trophy	6	72.36	8	105.91	8	178.27
Oct 29–31, 2021	2021 Skate Canada International	8	68.96	8	99.80	8	168.76
Nov 19–21, 2021	2021 Internationaux de France	4	70.74	7	105.17	5	175.91
Jan 3–9, 2022	(United States) 2022 U.S. Championships	5	77.90	7	107.92	7	185.82
Jan 18–23, 2022	(Estonia) 2022 Four Continents Championships	3	69.35	3	106.32	3	175.67

Results in the 2022–23 season
Date	Event	RD		FD		Total	
Date	Event	P	Score	P	Score	P	Score
Nov 11–13, 2022	(United Kingdom) 2022 MK John Wilson Trophy	4	75.00	4	112.42	4	187.42
Nov 25–27, 2022	(Finland) 2022 Grand Prix of Espoo	3	76.20	4	112.60	4	188.80
Dec 7–10, 2022	(Croatia) 2022 CS Golden Spin of Zagreb	2	76.54	1	114.77	1	191.31
Jan 23–29, 2023	(United States) 2023 U.S. Championships	4	77.37	3	121.08	3	198.45
Feb 7–12, 2023	(United States) 2023 Four Continents Championships	4	76.97	5	112.81	4	189.78
Mar 22–26, 2023	(Japan) 2023 World Championships	10	75.24	11	114.86	10	190.10

Results in the 2023–24 season
Date	Event	RD		FD		Total	
Date	Event	P	Score	P	Score	P	Score
Sep 20–23, 2023	(Germany) 2023 CS Nebelhorn Trophy	6	65.82	4	112.09	4	177.91
Oct 6–8, 2023	(Finland) 2023 CS Finlandia Trophy	2	74.15	3	116.99	2	191.14
Nov 3–5, 2023	2023 Grand Prix de France	4	72.94	4	113.76	4	186.70
Nov 17–19, 2023	(Finland) 2023 Grand Prix of Espoo	4	74.58	4	114.18	4	188.76
Jan 22–28, 2024	(United States) 2024 U.S. Championships	2	83.19	1	126.85	2	210.04
Jan 30 – Feb 4, 2024	(China) 2024 Four Continents Championships	3	77.47	5	116.67	3	194.14
Mar 18–24, 2024	(Canada) 2024 World Championships	8	79.26	7	121.06	7	200.32

Results in the 2024–25 season
Date	Event	RD		FD		Total	
Date	Event	P	Score	P	Score	P	Score
Sep 18–21, 2024	(Germany) 2024 CS Nebelhorn Trophy	2	77.66	2	119.85	2	197.51
Oct 11–13, 2024	(Hungary) 2024 CS Budapest Trophy	1	77.44	1	117.25	1	194.69
Nov 8–10, 2024	(Japan) 2024 NHK Trophy	2	79.64	2	119.33	2	198.97
Nov 22–24, 2024	2024 Cup of China	3	79.22	4	118.96	3	198.18
Jan 20–26, 2025	(United States) 2025 U.S. Championships	2	82.86	2	127.93	2	210.79
Feb 19–23, 2025	(South Korea) 2025 Four Continents Championships	4	79.30	4	117.78	4	197.08
Mar 25–30, 2025	(United States) 2025 World Championships	6	81.51	5	123.37	5	204.88

Results in the 2025–26 season
Date	Event	RD		FD		Total	
Date	Event	P	Score	P	Score	P	Score
Sep 25–27, 2025	(Germany) 2025 CS Nebelhorn Trophy	2	76.11	2	116.24	2	192.35
Oct 31 – Nov 2, 2025	2025 Skate Canada International	3	76.83	4	114.40	4	191.23
Nov 14–16, 2025	(United States) 2025 Skate America	5	72.74	4	113.29	5	186.03
Jan 4–11, 2026	(United States) 2026 U.S. Championships	3	83.29	3	123.66	3	206.95
Feb 6–19, 2026	(Italy) 2026 Winter Olympics	11	78.15	10	119.47	11	197.62
Mar 24–29, 2026	(Czech Republic) 2026 World Championships	7	80.89	8	119.67	8	200.56

Results in the 2026–27 season
Date	Event	RD		FD		Total	
Date	Event	P	Score	P	Score	P	Score
Sep 24–26, 2026	(Germany) 2026 CS Nebelhorn Trophy	1	78.98	2	109.85	1	188.83
Oct 23–25, 2026	2026 Grand Prix de France	3	77.83	3	111.53	3	189.36

==== Junior level ====
Results in the 2014–15 season
Date	Event	SD		FD		Total	
Date	Event	P	Score	P	Score	P	Score
Aug 26–29, 2014	2014 JGP Czech Republic	4	48.61	5	78.37	5	126.98
Sep 23–26, 2014	2014 JGP Estonia	4	50.62	6	76.98	4	127.60
Jan 18–25, 2015	(United States) 2015 U.S. Championships (Junior)	4	55.32	6	76.59	5	131.91

Results in the 2015–16 season
Date	Event	SD		FD		Total	
Date	Event	P	Score	P	Score	P	Score
Jul 30–31, 2015	(United States) 2015 Lake Placid Ice Dance (Junior)	2		2		2	135.90
Aug 26–29, 2015	2015 JGP Latvia	2	57.23	5	74.02	4	131.25
Sep 23–26, 2015	2015 JGP Poland	2	61.13	2	85.02	2	146.15
Jan 15–24, 2016	(United States) 2016 U.S. Championships (Junior)	4	64.81	5	87.98	4	152.79

Results in the 2016–17 season
Date	Event	SD		FD		Total	
Date	Event	P	Score	P	Score	P	Score
Aug 24–27, 2016	2016 JGP France	2	60.44	2	87.94	2	148.38
Sep 14–17, 2016	2016 JGP Russia	2	63.10	2	94.09	2	157.19
Dec 8–11, 2016	(France) 2016–17 Junior Grand Prix Final	4	61.39	4	88.59	4	149.98
Jan 14–22, 2017	(United States) 2017 U.S. Championships (Junior)	3	66.77	2	98.29	2	165.06
Mar 15–19, 2017	(Taiwan) 2017 World Junior Championships	6	60.53	3	94.15	3	154.68

Results in the 2017–18 season
Date	Event	SD		FD		Total	
Date	Event	P	Score	P	Score	P	Score
Jul 27–29, 2017	(United States) 2017 Lake Placid Ice Dance (Junior)	1	62.20	1	87.56	1	149.76
Aug 30 – Sep 2, 2017	2017 JGP Austria	1	57.82	1	87.57	1	145.39
Sep 20–23, 2017	2017 JGP Belarus	1	63.77	1	86.28	1	150.05
Dec 7–10, 2017	(Japan) 2017–18 Junior Grand Prix Final	2	64.10	2	87.66	2	151.76
Dec 29, 2017 – Jan 8, 2018	(United States) 2018 U.S. Championships (Junior)	1	68.70	1	90.48	1	159.18
Mar 5–11, 2018	(Bulgaria) 2018 World Junior Championships	6	60.85	2	86.83	2	147.68
