= Danny Moir =

Canadian ice dancer

Personal information
- Born: May 23, 1980 (age 46) London, Ontario
- Height: 1.75 m (5 ft 9 in)

Figure skating career
- Country: Canada
- Skating club: Ilderton, WC

Danny Moir (/ˈmɔɪjər/ MOY-ər; born May 23, 1980) is a Canadian former competitive ice dancer. He competed for most of his career with his cousin Sheri Moir. They are the 2001 Canadian national junior silver medalists and placed 11th at the 2001 World Junior Championships. They competed for two seasons on the Junior Grand Prix and placed 11th at the 2001 Nebelhorn Trophy. After that partnership ended, Moir competed with Kristina Lenko in the 2002-2003 season.

Moir now coaches in Copenhagen, Denmark. He is the older brother of Olympic gold medalist Scott Moir.
