= 2009 Rostelecom Cup =

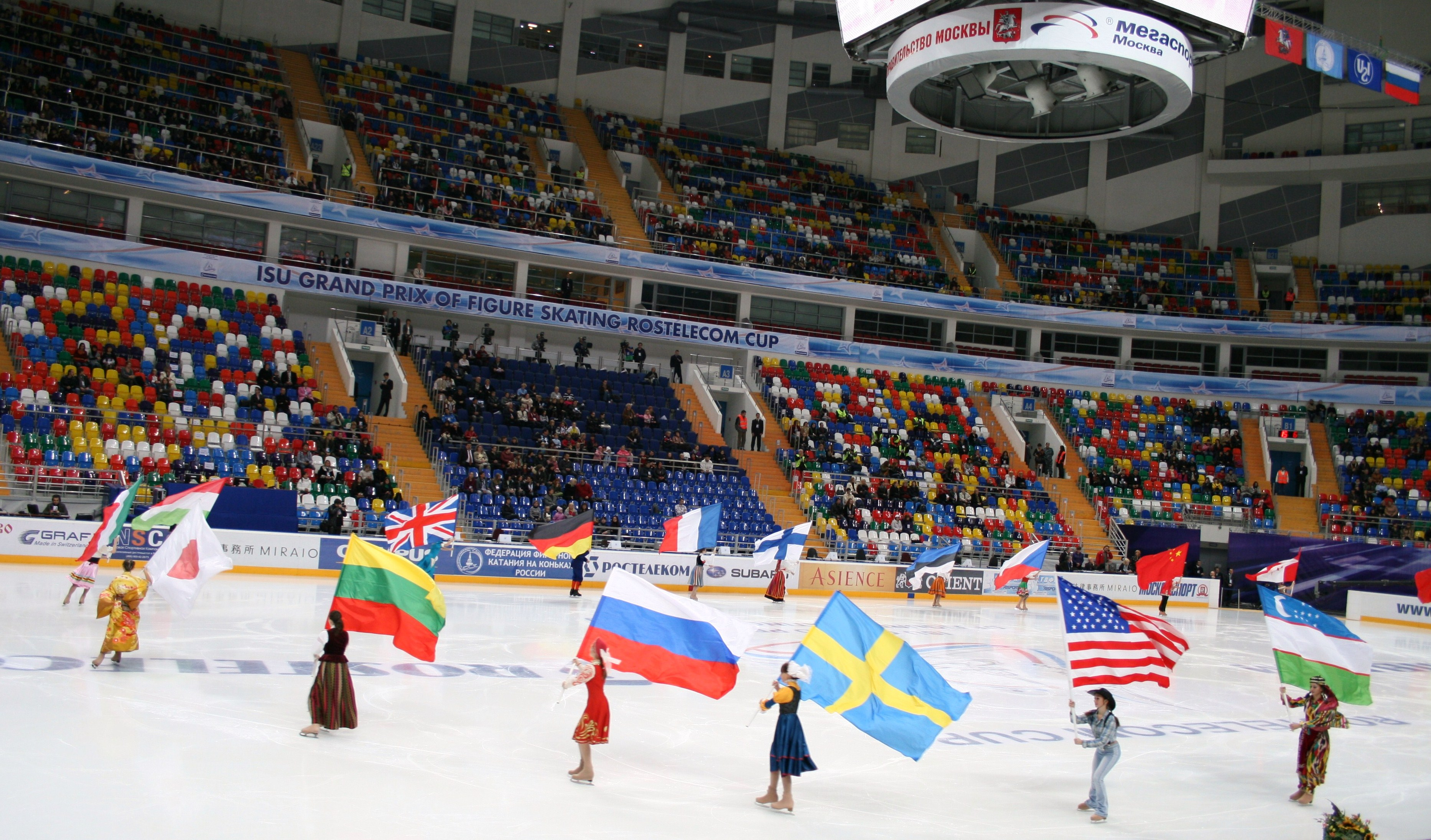
- The opening ceremony parade of flags
- Type: Grand Prix
- Date: October 22 – 25
- Season: 2009–10
- Location: Moscow
- Host: Figure Skating Federation of Russia
- Venue: Megasport Arena

Champions
- Men's singles: (Russia) Evgeni Plushenko
- Ladies' singles: (Japan) Miki Ando
- Pairs: (China) Pang Qing / Tong Jian
- Ice dance: (United States) Meryl Davis / Charlie White
- Previous: 2008 Cup of Russia
- Next: 2010 Rostelecom Cup
- Previous GP: 2009 Trophée Éric Bompard
- Next GP: 2009 Cup of China

The 2009 Rostelecom Cup was the second event of six in the 2009–10 ISU Grand Prix of Figure Skating, a senior-level international invitational competition series. It was held at the Megasport Arena in Moscow on October 22–25. Medals were awarded in the disciplines of men's singles, ladies' singles, pair skating, and ice dancing. Skaters earned points toward qualifying for the 2009–10 Grand Prix Final. The compulsory dance was the Tango Romantica.

The event was renamed in 2009 after Rostelecom, the sponsor of Russian Figure Skating Federation.

== Results ==
=== Men ===
Rank	Name	Nation	Total points	SP		FS	
1	Evgeni Plushenko	Russia	240.65	1	82.25	1	158.40
2	Takahiko Kozuka	Japan	215.13	2	75.50	2	139.63
3	Artem Borodulin	Russia	201.55	4	72.07	3	129.48
4	Johnny Weir	United States	198.55	3	72.57	6	125.98
5	Kevin van der Perren	Belgium	189.33	7	63.15	5	126.18
6	Adrian Schultheiss	Sweden	185.02	5	67.94	8	117.08
7	Brandon Mroz	United States	181.80	11	54.50	4	127.30
8	Shawn Sawyer	Canada	179.58	8	61.38	7	118.20
9	Florent Amodio	France	171.65	9	59.95	9	111.70
10	Ivan Tretiakov	Russia	164.30	6	65.10	10	99.20
11	Ari-Pekka Nurmenkari	Finland	149.91	10	57.31	11	92.60

=== Ladies ===
Rank	Name	Nation	Total points	SP		FS	
1	Miki Ando	Japan	171.93	3	57.18	1	114.75
2	Ashley Wagner	United States	163.97	5	55.16	2	108.81
3	Alena Leonova	Russia	160.06	4	56.78	3	103.28
4	Alissa Czisny	United States	158.30	2	57.64	4	100.66
5	Mao Asada	Japan	150.28	6	51.94	5	98.34
6	Júlia Sebestyén	Hungary	148.50	1	57.94	7	90.56
7	Amélie Lacoste	Canada	139.39	7	51.82	8	87.57
8	Jenna McCorkell	United Kingdom	134.70	11	40.94	6	93.76
9	Oksana Gozeva	Russia	128.52	8	51.08	9	77.44
10	Katarina Gerboldt	Russia	117.77	9	42.64	10	75.13
11	Annette Dytrt	Germany	109.74	12	36.76	11	72.98
12	Anastasia Gimazetdinova	Uzbekistan	108.46	10	42.30	12	66.16

=== Pairs ===
Rank	Name	Nation	Total points	SP		FS	
1	Pang Qing / Tong Jian	China	191.33	1	65.40	1	125.93
2	Yuko Kavaguti / Alexander Smirnov	Russia	180.14	2	61.62	2	118.52
3	Keauna McLaughlin / Rockne Brubaker	United States	160.55	3	61.34	5	99.21
4	Vera Bazarova / Yuri Larionov	Russia	156.28	4	54.42	3	101.86
5	Nicole Della Monica / Yannick Kocon	Italy	150.86	5	53.56	6	97.30
6	Mylène Brodeur / John Mattatall	Canada	148.43	7	46.66	4	101.77
7	Anastasia Martiusheva / Alexei Rogonov	Russia	138.17	6	51.94	7	86.23
8	Maria Sergejeva / Ilja Glebov	Estonia	128.62	8	44.88	8	83.74

=== Ice dancing ===
Rank	Name	Nation	Total points	CD		OD		FD	
1	Meryl Davis / Charlie White	United States	201.10	1	37.87	1	62.21	1	101.02
2	Anna Cappellini / Luca Lanotte	Italy	168.57	2	32.73	2	52.58	2	83.26
3	Ekaterina Rubleva / Ivan Shefer	Russia	163.32	3	30.33	3	50.92	3	82.07
4	Vanessa Crone / Paul Poirier	Canada	157.00	4	29.94	4	48.45	4	78.61
5	Anastasia Platonova / Alexander Grachev	Russia	153.22	7	27.93	5	47.88	5	77.41
6	Ekaterina Riazanova / Ilia Tkachenko	Russia	147.92	8	27.89	6	47.45	6	72.58
7	Lucie Myslivečková / Matěj Novák	Czech Republic	146.95	6	28.08	7	47.01	7	71.86
8	Katherine Copely / Deividas Stagniūnas	Lithuania	146.76	5	29.39	8	46.26	8	71.11
9	Carolina Hermann / Daniel Hermann	Germany	134.69	9	25.54	9	42.64	9	66.51
