= Andrei Maximishin =

Russian ice dancer

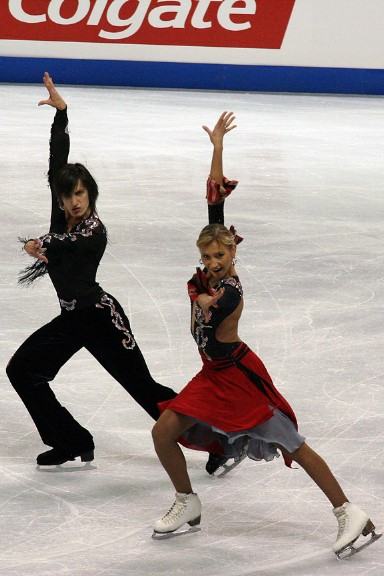
- Platonova and Maximishin at the 2006 Skate Canada International

Personal information
- Full name: Andrei Nikolaevich Maximishin
- Born: 20 December 1984 (age 41) Moscow, Russian SFSR, Soviet Union
- Height: 1.82 m (6 ft 0 in)

Figure skating career
- Country: Russia
- Skating club: Odintsovo
- Began skating: 1990
- Retired: 2008
Medal record
Representing Russia
Figure skating: Ice dancing
Winter Universiade
Silver medal – second place	2007 Turin	Ice dancing

Andrei Nikolayevich Maximishin (Russian: Андрей Николаевич Максимишин; born 20 December 1984) is a Russian former competitive ice dancer. With Anastasia Platonova, he is the 2006 Karl Schäfer Memorial silver medalist and won three gold medals on the ISU Junior Grand Prix series.

== Career ==
Early in his career, Maximishin had brief partnerships with Jana Khokhlova and Olga Orlova.

Maximishin competed with Anastasia Platonova from 2003 to 2007. They placed 6th at the 2005 World Junior Championships and 5th in 2006, as well as competing twice at the ISU Junior Grand Prix Final. Platonova and Maximishin placed 5th at 2006 Skate Canada International, their senior Grand Prix debut. They parted ways due to Platonova's back problem. They were coached by Alexei Gorshkov in Odintsovo.

Maximishin teamed up with Natalia Mikhailova in mid-2007, moving to her coach Alexander Zhulin. They competed together during the 2007-2008 season and won the silver medal at the 2007 Golden Spin of Zagreb.

== Programs ==
(with Platonova)

Season	Original dance	Free dance
2006–2007	Tango by Gotan Project	Legenda Flamenco by Didulia
2005–2006	Cha Cha: Caramelo; Mambo: Bye Bye	Xotica by René Dupéré
2004–2005	Quickstep from the "Muppet Show"; Slow foxtrot; Quickstep from the "Muppet Show"	Oriental dance

== Competitive highlights ==
GP: Grand Prix; JGP: Junior Grand Prix

=== With Mikhailova ===
International
Event	2007–2008
Golden Spin of Zagreb	2nd
National
Russian Championships	4th

=== With Platonova ===
International
Event	2003–04	2004–05	2005–06	2006–07
GP Cup of Russia				9th
GP Skate Canada				5th
Karl Schäfer				2nd
Universiade				2nd
International: Junior
Junior Worlds		6th	5th	
JGP Final		6th	6th	
JGP Bulgaria	3rd		3rd	
JGP Japan			1st	
JGP Romania		1st		
JGP Slovenia	7th			
JGP Ukraine		1st		
National
Russian Champ.				4th
Russian Jr. Champ.		3rd	3rd	

=== With Orlova ===
National
Event	2001–2002
Russian Junior Championships	7th

=== With Khokhlova ===
National
Event	2000–2001
Russian Junior Championships	9th
