= Figure skating at the 2014 Winter Olympics – Ice dance =

Ice dance at the XXII Olympic Winter Games
- Venue: Iceberg Skating Palace; Sochi, Russia
- Dates: 16–17 February 2014
- Competitors: 24 teams from 15 nations
- Winning score: 195.52 points

Medalists
1st place, gold medalist(s)		Meryl Davis and Charlie White	United States
2nd place, silver medalist(s)		Tessa Virtue and Scott Moir	Canada
3rd place, bronze medalist(s)		Elena Ilinykh and Nikita Katsalapov	Russia

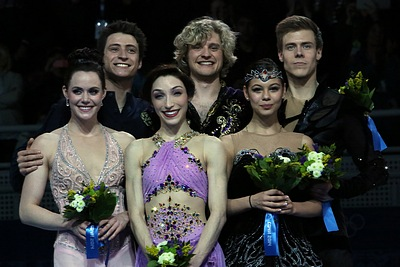
The medalists from the ice dance event at the 2014 Winter Olympics (from left to right): Tessa Virtue and Scott Moir of Canada (silver); Meryl Davis and Charlie White of the United States (gold); and Elena Ilinykh and Nikita Katsalapov of Russia (bronze)

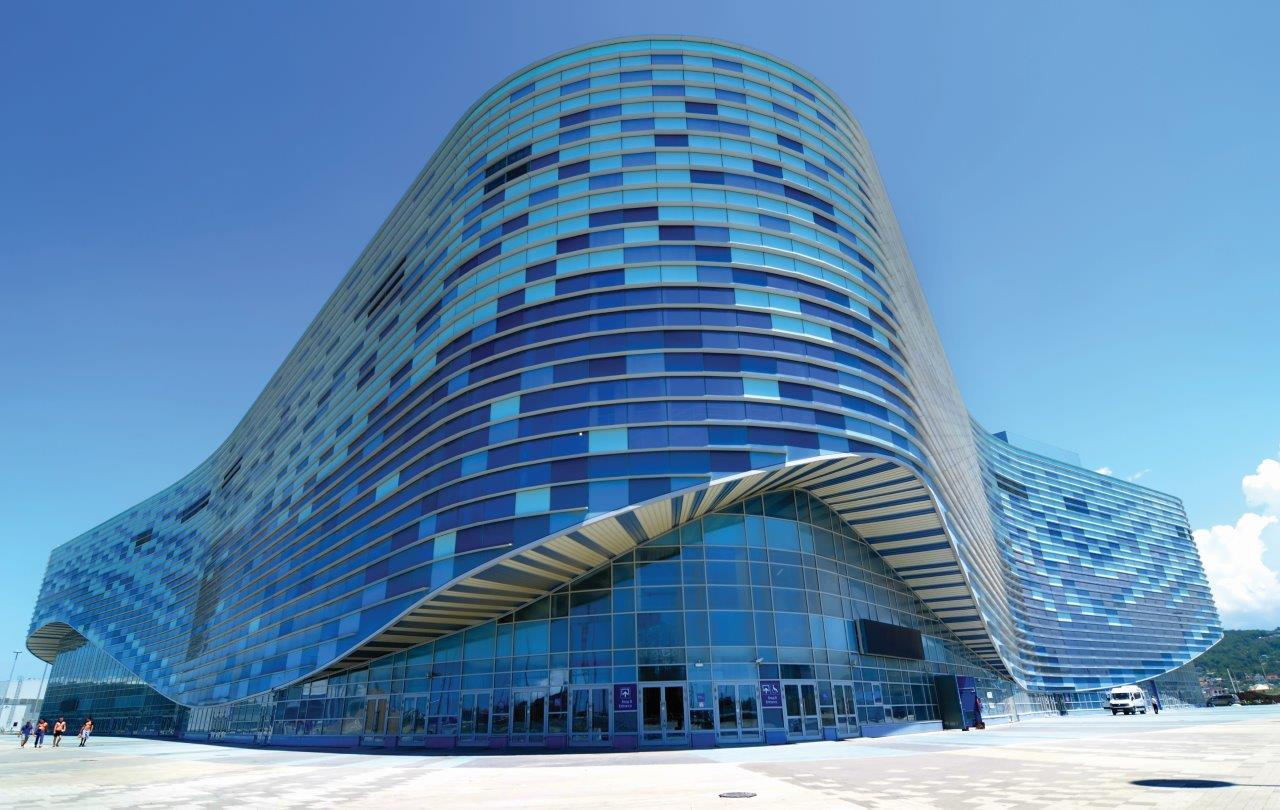
The figure skating events at the 2014 Winter Olympics were held at the Iceberg Skating Palace in Sochi, Russia.

The ice dance competition at the 2014 Winter Olympics was held on 16 and 17 February 2014 at the Iceberg Skating Palace in Sochi, Russia, and featured 24 teams from 15 different nations. Meryl Davis and Charlie White of the United States won the gold medals, Tessa Virtue and Scott Moir of Canada won the silver, and Elena Ilinykh and Nikita Katsalapov of Russia won the bronze. In addition to their gold medal victory, Davis and White were the first team from the United States to win the ice dance event at the Winter Olympics, setting new world record scores in the short dance, free dance, and overall total in the process.

== Background ==
The ice dance event was one of five figure skating competitions contested at the 2014 Winter Olympics in Sochi, Russia. It was held at the Iceberg Skating Palace over two days: the short dance took place on 16 February and the free dance on 17 February. The competition featured 24 teams representing 15 nations. Tessa Virtue and Scott Moir of Canada entered the competition as the reigning Olympic champions, having won the gold medals at the 2010 Winter Olympics. However, they were perceived as the underdogs, having lost to Meryl Davis and Charlie White of the United States at both the 2013 World Championships and the 2013–14 Grand Prix of Figure Skating Final. Virtue and Moir acknowledged that they had strong competition in Davis and White, Elena Ilinykh and Nikita Katsalapov of Russia, and Kaitlyn Weaver and Andrew Poje of Canada. While they would not confirm that the 2014 Winter Olympic would be the end of their competitive career, Steve Buffery of the Toronto Sun wrote that there was a sense of finality surrounding this skating season, especially at the 2013 Skate Canada International, where Moir spoke about how much his seventeen-year partnership with Virtue had meant to him. In addition to their gold medals from the 2010 Winter Olympics, Virtue and Moir had also been part of the Canadian team that won the silver medals earlier at the figure skating team event. Virtue and Moir were two-time world champions, two-time Four Continents champions, and six-time Canadian national champions.

Virtue and Moir, and their top rivals, Meryl Davis and Charlie White, trained together at the same ice academy in Detroit, even sharing the same coach and choreographer (Marina Zoueva). Davis and White were two-time world champions, three-time Four Continents champions, five-time Grand Prix Final champions, and six-time U.S. national champions. Liz Clarke of The Washington Post wrote that over the past four years, Virtue and Moir, and Davis and White, competed at a higher level than anyone else. They swapped World Championship victories (Virtue and Moir won in 2010 and 2012; Davis and White in 2011 and 2013), and between the two teams, they won eighteen out of the twenty most recent major competitions.

== Qualification ==
Nineteen quota spots in the ice dance event were awarded based on results at the 2013 World Figure Skating Championships. An additional five quota spots were earned at the 2013 Nebelhorn Trophy.

Qualifying nations in ice dance
Event	Teams per NOC	Qualifying NOCs	Total teams
2013 World Championships	3	United States; Canada; Russia	19
2013 World Championships	2	Italy; France; Germany	19
2013 World Championships	1	Great Britain; Ukraine; Lithuania; Azerbaijan	19
2013 Nebelhorn Trophy	1	China; Turkey; Australia; Japan; Spain	5
Total			24

== Required performance elements ==
Couples competing in ice dance first performed their short dances on 16 February. The required rhythm was the quickstep, but teams could also include one or two of the following: the foxtrot, the Charleston, or the swing. Lasting 2 minutes 50 seconds (+/− 10 seconds), the short dance had to include the following elements: two sections of the Finnstep, one dance lift, one step sequence while not touching, and one set of sequential twizzles. The Finnstep had been developed by Finnish ice dancers Susanna Rahkamo and Petri Kokko as a variation of the quickstep and had been ratified by the International Skating Union as a compulsory dance in 2008.

The twenty highest scoring teams after the short dance performed their free dances on 17 February. The free dance had to last 4 minutes (+/− 10 seconds), and include the following: two short lifts and one long lift, or four short lifts and one choreographic dance lift; one dance spin; one straight-line step sequence while in hold; one curved step sequence while in hold; and one set of synchronized twizzles.

== Judging ==
Skaters were judged according to the required technical elements of their program (such as choreographic elements), as well as the overall presentation of their program, based on five program components (skating skills, transitions/linking footwork, performance/execution, composition/choreography, and musical interpretation/timing). Each technical element in a figure skating performance was assigned a predetermined base point value and scored by a panel of nine judges on a scale from −3 to +3 based on the quality of its execution. Each Grade of Execution (GOE) from –3 to +3 was assigned a value as indicated on the Scale of Values. For example, a curve lift (level 4) was worth a base value of 4.00 points, and a GOE of +3 was worth 1.50 points, so a curve lift (level 4) with a GOE of +3 earned 5.50 points. The judging panel's GOE for each element was determined by calculating the trimmed mean (the average after discarding the highest and lowest scores). The panel's scores for all elements were added together to generate a Total Elements Score. At the same time, the judges evaluated each performance based on the five aforementioned program components and assigned each a score from 0.25 to 10 in 0.25-point increments. The judging panel's final score for each program component was also determined by calculating the trimmed mean. Those scores were then multiplied by the factor shown on the chart below; the results were added together to generate a total Program Component Score.

Ice dance program component factoring
Component	Short dance	Free dance
Skating skills	0.80	1.25
Transitions/Footwork	0.70	1.75
Performance/ Execution	0.70	1.00
Composition/ Choreography	0.80	1.00
Musical interpretation/ Timing	1.00	1.00

Deductions were applied for certain violations, such as time infractions or falls. The Total Elements Score and Program Component Score were then added together, minus any deductions, to generate a final performance score for each skater or team.

== Results ==
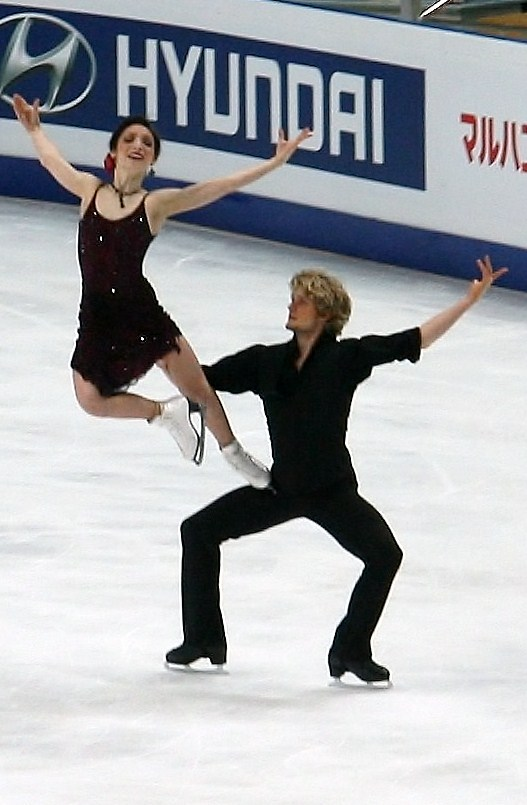
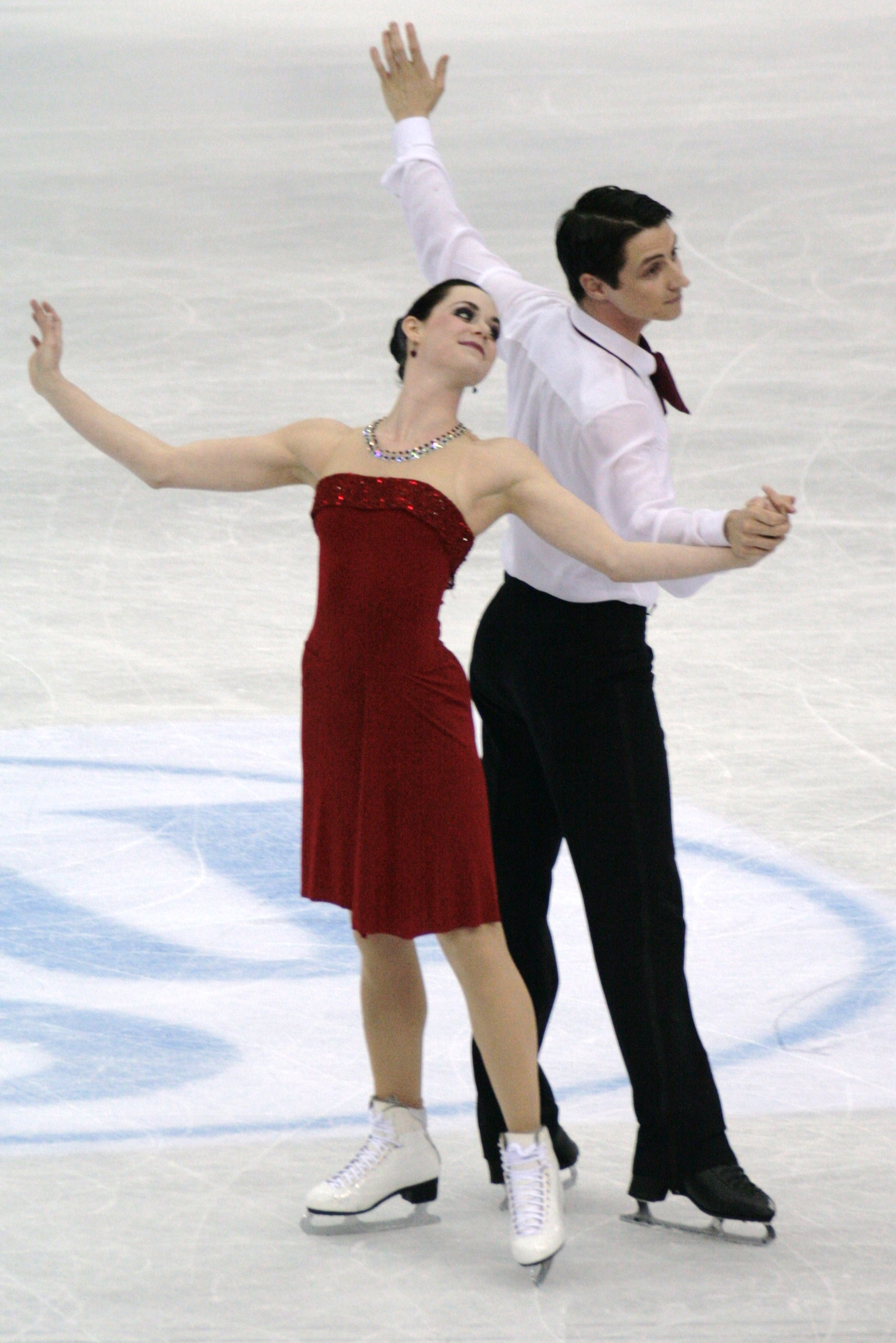
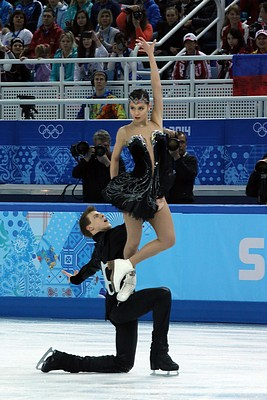
The gold, silver, and bronze medalists from the ice dance event at the 2014 Winter Olympics (from left to right):
Meryl Davis and Charlie White of the United States (gold); Tessa Virtue and Scott Moir of Canada (silver); and Elena Ilinykh and Nikita Katsalapov of Russia (bronze)

Code key

- TSS – Total Segment Score
- TES – Total Elements Score
- PCS – Program Component Score
- SS – Skating skills
- TR – Transitions
- PE – Performance
- CC – Composition/Choreography
- IT – Musical interpretation/Timing
- DED – Deductions

=== Short dance ===
The short dance was held on 16 February. Meryl Davis and Charlie White of the United States finished in first place; their score of 78.89 was a new world record and was 2.56 points higher than that of Tessa Virtue and Scott Moir of Canada. One-third of that point difference was due to a small error that Virtue and Moir made in their Finnstep, although Moir stated that without watching their performance, he had no idea what the error might have been. Petri Kokko, the Finnish ice dancer who, with his partner Susanna Rahkamo, is credited with creating the Finnstep, tweeted afterward that, in his opinion, Virtue and Moir "should be leading". He also tweeted that the timing of Davis and White was off and felt "restrained". Davis and White skated to a medley from My Fair Lady, including the song "I Could Have Danced All Night", and demonstrated what Philip Hersh of the Chicago Tribune described as a "seamless interaction". Rachel Cohen of the Associated Press wrote that their twizzles were at "another speed" than the other competitors, as they spun across the ice "in perfect unison". Virtue and Moir skated to a medley of jazz standards from Louis Armstrong and Ella Fitzgerald, and appeared to bounce across the ice. Elena Ilinykh and Nikita Katsalapov of Russia finished in third place, 3.29 points behind Virtue and Moir, while Nathalie Péchalat and Fabian Bourzat of France were in fourth place.

Short dance results
Pl.	Team	Nation	TSS	TES	PCS	SS	TR	PE	CC	IT	DED
1	Meryl Davis; Charlie White	United States	78.89	39.72	39.17	9.68	9.57	9.93	9.86	9.89	0.00
2	Tessa Virtue; Scott Moir	Canada	76.33	37.64	38.69	9.54	9.43	9.82	9.71	9.82	0.00
3	Elena Ilinykh; Nikita Katsalapov	Russia	73.04	36.36	36.68	9.18	8.89	9.25	9.29	9.21	0.00
4	Nathalie Péchalat; Fabian Bourzat	France	72.78	36.43	36.35	9.04	8.82	9.18	9.18	9.18	0.00
5	Ekaterina Bobrova; Dmitri Soloviev	Russia	69.97	33.58	36.39	8.96	8.75	9.29	9.18	9.25	0.00
6	Anna Cappellini; Luca Lanotte	Italy	67.58	32.85	34.73	8.68	8.46	8.75	8.79	8.71	0.00
7	Kaitlyn Weaver; Andrew Poje	Canada	65.93	31.93	35.00	8.71	8.50	8.79	8.89	8.82	1.00
8	Madison Chock; Evan Bates	United States	65.46	32.78	32.68	8.14	8.00	8.25	8.18	8.25	0.00
9	Maia Shibutani; Alex Shibutani	United States	64.47	33.36	31.11	7.93	7.54	7.86	7.75	7.79	0.00
10	Nelli Zhiganshina; Alexander Gazsi	Germany	60.91	30.64	30.27	7.57	7.21	7.79	7.71	7.54	0.00
11	Penny Coomes; Nicholas Buckland	Great Britain	59.33	30.08	30.25	7.61	7.39	7.61	7.75	7.46	1.00
12	Sara Hurtado; Adrián Díaz	Spain	58.58	31.78	26.80	6.61	6.43	6.82	6.86	6.75	0.00
13	Pernelle Carron; Lloyd Jones	France	58.25	30.50	27.75	6.93	6.75	7.04	7.11	6.86	0.00
14	Julia Zlobina; Alexei Sitnikov	Azerbaijan	58.15	28.79	29.36	7.32	7.25	7.43	7.32	7.36	0.00
15	Charlène Guignard; Marco Fabbri	Italy	58.14	30.00	28.14	7.11	6.82	7.07	7.07	7.07	0.00
16	Victoria Sinitsina; Ruslan Zhiganshin	Russia	58.01	30.43	27.58	6.89	6.61	6.93	7.04	6.96	0.00
17	Isabella Tobias; Deividas Stagniūnas	Lithuania	56.40	27.79	28.61	7.14	6.89	7.25	7.32	7.14	0.00
18	Alexandra Paul; Mitchell Islam	Canada	55.91	27.50	28.41	7.04	6.82	7.18	7.21	7.21	0.00
19	Tanja Kolbe; Stefano Caruso	Germany	54.43	28.22	26.21	6.54	6.29	6.57	6.71	6.61	0.00
20	Danielle O'Brien; Gregory Merriman	Australia	52.68	28.29	24.39	6.04	5.79	6.14	6.25	6.21	0.00
21	Cathy Reed; Chris Reed	Japan	52.29	26.87	25.42	6.29	6.14	6.50	6.61	6.25	0.00
22	Alisa Agafonova; Alper Uçar	Turkey	49.84	25.14	24.70	6.21	5.96	6.32	6.29	6.11	0.00
23	Huang Xintong; Zheng Xun	China	48.96	23.14	25.82	6.50	6.32	6.50	6.57	6.39	0.00
24	Siobhan Heekin-Canedy; Dmitri Dun	Ukraine	41.90	18.36	23.54	5.93	5.75	5.89	6.18	5.71	0.00

=== Free dance ===
The free dance was held on 17 February. Meryl Davis and Charlie White became the first team from the United States to win the Olympic gold medals in ice dance. Their performance to Scheherazade by Nikolai Rimsky-Korsakov featured intricate choreography and fierce movements. Having won silver in the ice dance event at the 2010 Winter Olympics and bronze as part of the American team at the earlier team event, Davis and White became the first American figure skaters to win three Olympic medals. Davis and White's total score of 195.52 was a new world record. Tessa Virtue and Scott Moir performed their free dance to a series of pieces by Russian composers Alexander Glazunov and Alexander Scriabin, and finished in second place. Virtue and Moir deliberately chose this music knowing they would perform what would likely be their swan song before a Russian audience. Elena Ilinykh and Nikita Katsalapov, performing to music from Swan Lake by Pyotr Ilyich Tchaikovsky, won the bronze medals. Nathalie Péchalat and Fabian Bourzat finished in fourth place.

Free dance results
Pl.	Team	Nation	TSS	TES	PCS	SS	TR	PE	CC	IT	DED
1	Meryl Davis; Charlie White	United States	116.63	57.50	59.13	9.71	9.75	9.93	10.00	10.00	0.00
2	Tessa Virtue; Scott Moir	Canada	114.66	56.22	58.44	9.64	9.57	9.89	9.89	9.86	0.00
3	Elena Ilinykh; Nikita Katsalapov	Russia	110.44	54.14	56.30	9.32	9.14	9.61	9.54	9.50	0.00
4	Nathalie Péchalat; Fabian Bourzat	France	104.44	51.16	54.28	8.86	8.89	9.25	9.18	9.21	1.00
5	Kaitlyn Weaver; Andrew Poje	Canada	103.18	50.43	52.75	8.75	8.54	9.00	8.82	9.04	0.00
6	Ekaterina Bobrova; Dmitri Soloviev	Russia	102.95	48.50	54.45	9.00	8.89	9.18	9.21	9.25	0.00
7	Anna Cappellini; Luca Lanotte	Italy	101.92	49.50	52.42	8.61	8.54	8.89	8.86	8.96	0.00
8	Madison Chock; Evan Bates	United States	99.18	49.01	50.17	8.36	8.14	8.54	8.39	8.54	0.00
9	Penny Coomes; Nicholas Buckland	Great Britain	91.78	44.50	47.28	7.75	7.71	7.96	8.14	8.00	0.00
10	Maia Shibutani; Alex Shibutani	United States	90.70	43.42	48.28	8.18	7.82	8.21	8.11	8.04	1.00
11	Julia Zlobina; Alexei Sitnikov	Azerbaijan	90.48	45.23	45.25	7.61	7.36	7.54	7.75	7.57	0.00
12	Nelli Zhiganshina; Alexander Gazsi	Germany	89.86	45.41	45.45	7.54	7.36	7.71	7.79	7.64	1.00
13	Sara Hurtado; Adrián Díaz	Spain	88.39	46.13	42.26	7.00	6.82	7.18	7.25	7.14	0.00
14	Charlène Guignard; Marco Fabbri	Italy	86.64	45.28	41.36	6.96	6.64	6.96	7.04	7.04	0.00
15	Pernelle Carron; Lloyd Jones	France	84.62	41.95	42.67	7.18	6.82	7.18	7.32	7.25	0.00
16	Alexandra Paul; Mitchell Islam	Canada	82.79	41.98	40.81	6.86	6.64	6.86	6.93	6.82	0.00
17	Victoria Sinitsina; Ruslan Zhiganshin	Russia	82.65	40.90	41.75	6.96	6.86	6.86	7.11	7.07	0.00
18	Isabella Tobias; Deividas Stagniūnas	Lithuania	82.60	39.86	42.74	7.18	6.82	7.25	7.32	7.25	0.00
19	Tanja Kolbe; Stefano Caruso	Germany	76.13	38.71	38.42	6.39	6.18	6.50	6.57	6.54	1.00
20	Danielle O'Brien; Gregory Merriman	Australia	75.85	39.03	36.82	6.07	5.86	6.32	6.36	6.29	0.00

=== Overall ===
Ice dance results
Rank	Team	Nation	Total	SD		FD	
1st place, gold medalist(s)	Meryl Davis; Charlie White	United States	195.52	1	78.89	1	116.63
2nd place, silver medalist(s)	Tessa Virtue; Scott Moir	Canada	190.99	2	76.33	2	114.66
3rd place, bronze medalist(s)	Elena Ilinykh; Nikita Katsalapov	Russia	183.48	3	73.04	3	110.44
4	Nathalie Péchalat; Fabian Bourzat	France	177.22	4	72.78	4	104.44
5	Ekaterina Bobrova; Dmitri Soloviev	Russia	172.92	5	69.97	6	102.95
6	Anna Cappellini; Luca Lanotte	Italy	169.50	6	67.58	7	101.92
7	Kaitlyn Weaver; Andrew Poje	Canada	169.11	7	65.93	5	103.18
8	Madison Chock; Evan Bates	United States	164.64	8	65.46	8	99.18
9	Maia Shibutani; Alex Shibutani	United States	155.17	9	64.47	10	90.70
10	Penny Coomes; Nicholas Buckland	Great Britain	151.11	11	59.33	9	91.78
11	Nelli Zhiganshina; Alexander Gazsi	Germany	150.77	10	60.91	12	89.86
12	Julia Zlobina; Alexei Sitnikov	Azerbaijan	148.63	14	58.15	11	90.48
13	Sara Hurtado; Adrián Díaz	Spain	146.97	12	58.58	13	88.39
14	Charlène Guignard; Marco Fabbri	Italy	144.78	15	58.14	14	86.64
15	Pernelle Carron; Lloyd Jones	France	142.87	13	58.25	15	84.62
16	Victoria Sinitsina; Ruslan Zhiganshin	Russia	140.66	16	58.01	17	82.65
17	Isabella Tobias; Deividas Stagniūnas	Lithuania	139.00	17	56.40	18	82.60
18	Alexandra Paul; Mitchell Islam	Canada	138.70	18	55.91	16	82.79
19	Tanja Kolbe; Stefano Caruso	Germany	130.56	19	54.43	19	76.13
20	Danielle O'Brien; Gregory Merriman	Australia	128.53	20	52.68	20	75.85
21	Cathy Reed; Chris Reed	Japan	52.29	21	52.29	Did not advance to free dance	
22	Alisa Agafonova; Alper Uçar	Turkey	49.84	22	49.84	Did not advance to free dance	
23	Huang Xintong; Zheng Xun	China	48.96	23	48.96	Did not advance to free dance	
24	Siobhan Heekin-Canedy; Dmitri Dun	Ukraine	41.90	24	41.90	Did not advance to free dance	

== Records ==
The following new record high scores were set during this competition.

Record high scores
Date	Skater(s)	Segment	Score	Ref.
16 February 2014	(United States); Meryl Davis; Charlie White	Short dance	78.89	
17 February 2014	(Canada); Tessa Virtue; Scott Moir	Free dance	114.66	
17 February 2014	(United States); Meryl Davis; Charlie White	Free dance	116.63	
17 February 2014	(United States); Meryl Davis; Charlie White	Total score	195.52	

== Works cited ==
- "International Skating Union – Special Regulations & Technical Rules – Single & Pair Skating and Ice Dance 2012" (PDF). International Skating Union. June 2012. Archived from the original (PDF) on 22 February 2014.
