= 2008 Cup of Russia =

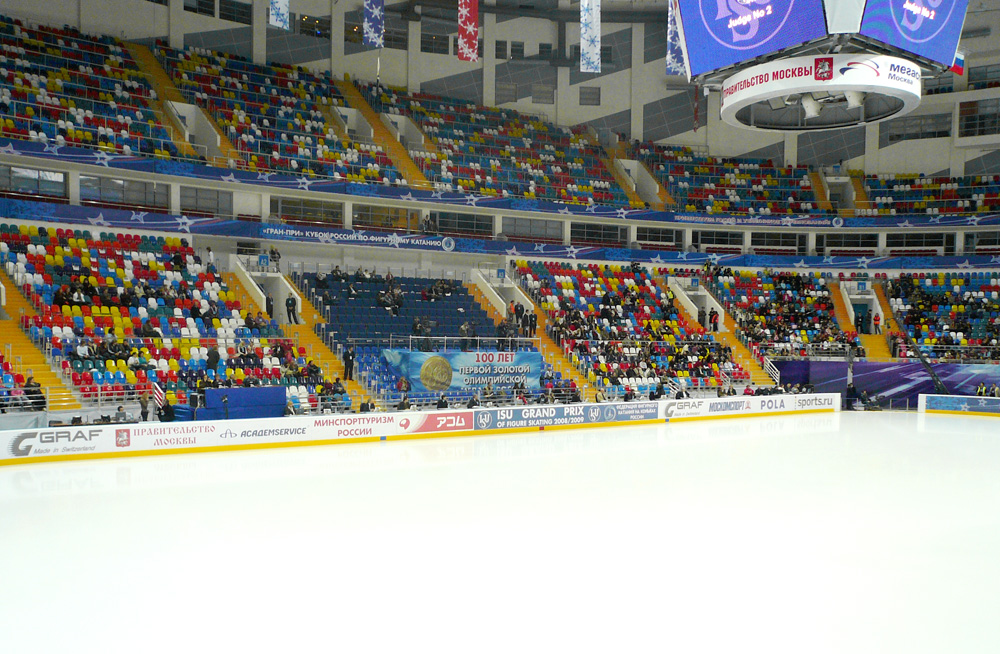
- The arena during the competition
- Type: Grand Prix
- Date: November 20 – 23
- Season: 2008–09
- Location: Moscow
- Host: Figure Skating Federation of Russia
- Venue: Megasport Arena

Champions
- Men's singles: (France) Brian Joubert
- Ladies' singles: (Italy) Carolina Kostner
- Pairs: (China) Zhang Dan / Zhang Hao
- Ice dance: (Russia) Jana Khokhlova / Sergei Novitski
- Previous: 2007 Cup of Russia
- Next: 2009 Rostelecom Cup
- Previous GP: 2008 Trophée Éric Bompard
- Next GP: 2008 NHK Trophy

The 2008 Cup of Russia was the fifth event of six in the 2008–09 ISU Grand Prix of Figure Skating, a senior-level international invitational competition series. It was held at the Megasport Arena in Moscow on November 20–23. Medals were awarded in the disciplines of men's singles, ladies' singles, pair skating, and ice dancing. Skaters earned points toward qualifying for the 2008–09 Grand Prix Final. The compulsory dance was the Viennese Waltz.

== Schedule ==
- Friday, November 21
  - Compulsory dance
  - Ladies' short program
  - Pairs' short program
  - Men's short program
- Saturday, November 22
  - Ladies' free skating
  - Original dance
  - Pairs' free skating
  - Men's free skating
- Sunday, November 23
  - Free dance
  - Exhibition gala

== Results ==
=== Men ===
Rank	Name	Nation	Total points	SP		FS	
1	Brian Joubert	France	230.78	1	86.10	4	144.68
2	Tomáš Verner	Czech Republic	222.94	2	73.20	1	149.74
3	Alban Préaubert	France	219.08	4	71.60	3	147.48
4	Jeremy Abbott	United States	217.48	6	68.80	2	148.68
5	Adam Rippon	United States	207.93	3	71.62	5	136.31
6	Kevin van der Perren	Belgium	199.13	5	69.68	7	129.45
7	Sergei Voronov	Russia	190.31	12	58.50	6	131.81
8	Kristoffer Berntsson	Sweden	185.07	7	66.21	9	118.86
9	Artem Borodulin	Russia	180.04	11	58.84	8	121.20
10	Alexander Uspenski	Russia	174.24	9	62.60	10	111.64
11	Li Chengjiang	China	163.60	8	62.95	12	100.65
12	Vaughn Chipeur	Canada	161.49	10	59.60	11	101.89

=== Ladies ===
Rank	Name	Nation	Total points	SP		FS	
1	Carolina Kostner	Italy	170.72	2	57.02	1	113.70
2	Rachael Flatt	United States	166.06	3	55.92	2	110.14
3	Fumie Suguri	Japan	162.04	1	58.30	3	103.74
4	Alissa Czisny	United States	151.03	5	53.50	4	97.53
5	Alena Leonova	Russia	145.93	7	50.96	5	94.97
6	Jelena Glebova	Estonia	140.67	6	51.02	6	89.65
7	Júlia Sebestyén	Hungary	131.54	4	53.64	10	77.90
8	Kimmie Meissner	United States	131.36	8	48.08	7	83.28
9	Kim Na-young	South Korea	125.95	10	43.26	8	82.69
10	Nina Petushkova	Russia	125.61	9	43.30	9	82.31

=== Pairs ===
Rank	Name	Nation	Total points	SP		FS	
1	Zhang Dan / Zhang Hao	China	177.42	1	67.06	2	110.36
2	Yuko Kawaguchi / Alexander Smirnov	Russia	169.27	2	58.76	1	110.51
3	Tatiana Volosozhar / Stanislav Morozov	Ukraine	167.86	3	58.34	3	109.52
4	Lubov Iliushechkina / Nodari Maisuradze	Russia	150.79	5	49.96	4	100.83
5	Ksenia Ozerova / Alexander Enbert	Russia	147.88	4	52.26	5	95.62
6	Monica Pisotta / Michael Stewart	Canada	129.33	6	47.86	6	81.47
7	Amanda Velenosi / Mark Fernandez	Canada	98.85	7	35.56	8	63.29
8	Ekaterina Sokolova / Fedor Sokolov	Israel	97.73	8	31.06	7	66.67

=== Ice dancing ===
Rank	Name	Nation	Total points	CD		OD		FD	
1	Jana Khokhlova / Sergei Novitski	Russia	187.62	2	36.19	1	59.33	1	92.10
2	Oksana Domnina / Maxim Shabalin	Russia	184.66	1	38.77	2	58.64	3	87.25
3	Meryl Davis / Charlie White	United States	170.61	3	35.77	8	43.68	2	91.16
4	Anna Cappellini / Luca Lanotte	Italy	169.76	4	32.57	3	54.25	4	82.94
5	Alexandra Zaretski / Roman Zaretski	Israel	151.43	7	29.33	7	45.99	5	76.11
6	Katherine Copely / Deividas Stagniūnas	Lithuania	151.19	6	29.57	5	47.65	7	73.97
7	Anastasia Platonova / Alexander Grachev	Russia	151.14	8	28.46	6	47.04	6	75.64
8	Anna Zadorozhniuk / Sergei Verbillo	Ukraine	145.72	5	30.16	4	48.38	10	67.18
9	Allie Hann-McCurdy / Michael Coreno	Canada	138.51	9	26.43	9	41.49	8	70.59
10	Zoé Blanc / Pierre-Loup Bouquet	France	132.28	10	24.43	10	40.47	9	67.38
