= ISU Junior Grand Prix in Romania =

International figure skating competition

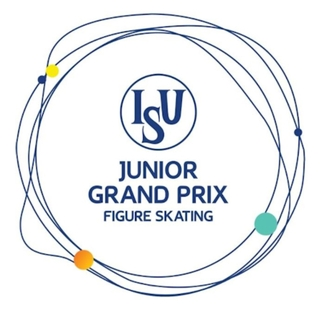
- Status: Inactive
- Genre: ISU Junior Grand Prix
- Frequency: Occasional
- Country: Romania
- Inaugurated: 2004
- Most recent: 2011
- Organiser: Romanian Skating Federation

The ISU Junior Grand Prix in Romania is an international figure skating competition sanctioned by the International Skating Union (ISU), organized and hosted by the Romanian Skating Federation (Romanian: Federatia Romana de Patinaj). It is held periodically as an event of the ISU Junior Grand Prix of Figure Skating (JGP), a series of international competitions exclusively for junior-level skaters. Medals may be awarded in men's singles, women's singles, pair skating, and ice dance. Skaters earn points based on their results at the qualifying competitions each season, and the top skaters or teams in each discipline are invited to then compete at the Junior Grand Prix of Figure Skating Final.

== History ==
The ISU Junior Grand Prix of Figure Skating (JGP) was established by the International Skating Union (ISU) in 1997 and consists of a series of seven international figure skating competitions exclusively for junior-level skaters. The locations of the Junior Grand Prix events change every year. While all seven competitions feature the men's, women's, and ice dance events, only four competitions each season feature the pairs event. Skaters earn points based on their results each season, and the top skaters or teams in each discipline are then invited to compete at the Junior Grand Prix of Figure Skating Final.

Skaters are eligible to compete on the junior-level circuit if they are at least 13 years old before 1 July of the respective season, but not yet 19 (for single skaters), 21 (for men and women in ice dance and women in pair skating), or 23 (for men in pair skating). Competitors are chosen by their respective skating federations. The number of entries allotted to each ISU member nation in each discipline is determined by their results at the prior World Junior Figure Skating Championships.

Romania hosted its first Junior Grand Prix competition in 2004 in Miercurea Ciuc. Ryo Shibata and Akiko Kitamura of Japan won the men's and women's events, respectively. Tatiana Kokoreva and Egor Golovkin of Russia won the pairs event, and Anastasia Platonova and Andrei Maximishin of Russia won the ice dance event. Romania hosted two subsequent Junior Grand Prix events in Miercurea Ciuc in 2006 and 2007, and two in Brașov in 2010 and 2011. The 2011 event was the competition's most recent iteration.

== Medalists ==
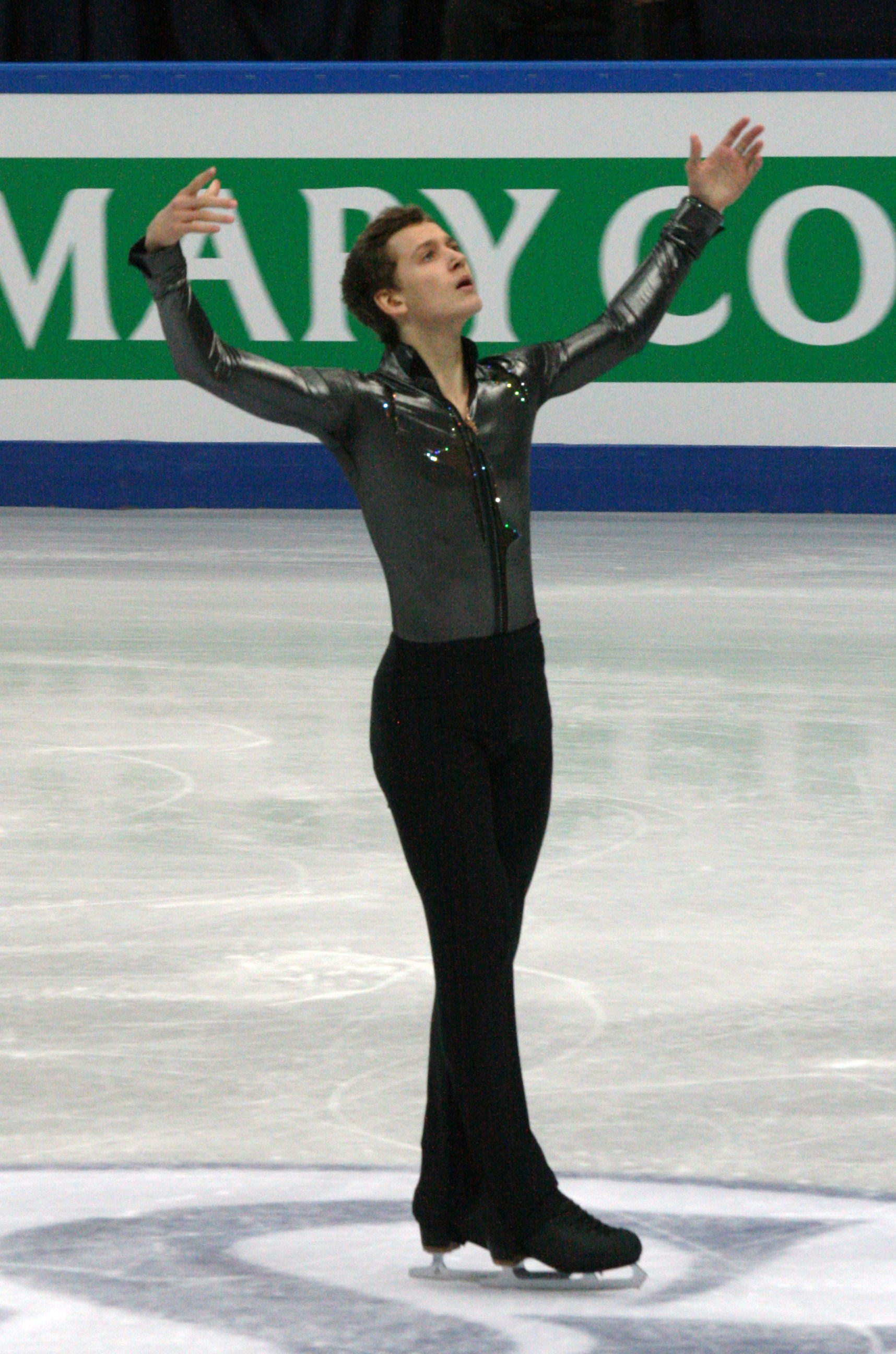
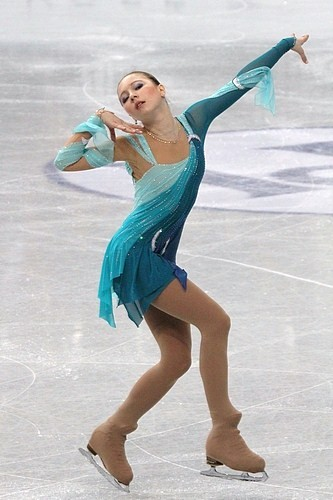
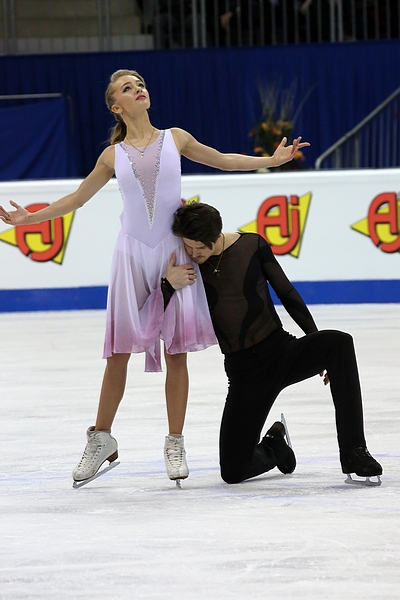
The 2011 Brașov Cup champions (all from Russia): Maxim Kovtun (men's singles); Polina Shelepen (women's singles); and Alexandra Stepanova and Ivan Bukin (ice dance)

=== Men's singles ===
Men's event medalists
Year	Location	Gold	Silver	Bronze	Ref.
2004	Miercurea Ciuc	(Japan) Ryo Shibata	(Russia) Sergei Dobrin	(Russia) Mikhail Magerovski	
2006	Miercurea Ciuc	(United States) Tommy Steenberg	(Russia) Artem Borodulin	(Japan) Hirofumi Torii	
2007	Miercurea Ciuc	(United States) Adam Rippon	(Russia) Ivan Bariev	(Japan) Takahito Mura	
2010	Brașov	(United States) Keegan Messing	(United States) Joshua Farris	(Japan) Keiji Tanaka	
2011	Brașov	(Russia) Maxim Kovtun	(Japan) Ryuju Hino	(Canada) Nam Nguyen	

=== Women's singles ===
Women's event medalists
Year	Location	Gold	Silver	Bronze	Ref.
2004	Miercurea Ciuc	(Japan) Akiko Kitamura	(Japan) Nana Takeda	(United States) Jessica Houston	
2006	Miercurea Ciuc	(Japan) Nana Takeda	(United States) Melissa Bulanhagui	(Russia) Ekaterina Kozireva	
2007	Miercurea Ciuc	(United States) Chrissy Hughes	(Russia) Alena Leonova	(Japan) Rumi Suizu	
2010	Brașov	(Russia) Elizaveta Tuktamysheva	(United States) Kristiene Gong	(Japan) Shion Kokubun	
2011	Brașov	(Russia) Polina Shelepen	(Russia) Polina Korobeynikova	(South Korea) Kim Hae-jin	

=== Pairs ===
Pairs event medalists
Year	Location	Gold	Silver	Bronze	Ref.
2004	Miercurea Ciuc	(Russia); Tatiana Kokoreva; Egor Golovkin	(United States); Mariel Miller; Rockne Brubaker	(Russia); Elena Efaieva; Alexei Menshikov	
2006	Miercurea Ciuc	No pairs competitions			
2007	Miercurea Ciuc	No pairs competitions			
2010	Brașov	No pairs competitions			
2011	Brașov	No pairs competitions			

=== Ice dance ===
Ice dance event medalists
Year	Location	Gold	Silver	Bronze	Ref.
2004	Miercurea Ciuc	(Russia); Anastasia Platonova; Andrei Maximishin	(Israel); Alexandra Zaretsky; Roman Zaretsky	(United States); Meryl Davis; Charlie White	
2006	Miercurea Ciuc	(Russia); Kristina Gorshkova; Vitali Butikov	(Italy); Camilla Spelta; Marco Garavaglia	(Ukraine); Nadezhda Frolenkova; Mykhailo Kasalo	
2007	Miercurea Ciuc	(Canada); Vanessa Crone; Paul Poirier	(Russia); Ekaterina Riazanova; John Guerreiro	(Russia); Ksenia Monko; Kirill Khaliavin	
2010	Brașov	(Russia); Ksenia Monko; Kirill Khaliavin	(Ukraine); Anastasia Galyeta; Oleksii Shumskyi	(United States); Lauri Bonacorsi; Travis Mager	
2011	Brașov	(Russia); Alexandra Stepanova; Ivan Bukin	(Ukraine); Anastasia Galyeta; Oleksii Shumskyi	(Canada); Mackenzie Bent; Garrett MacKeen	
