= 2006 Skate Canada International =

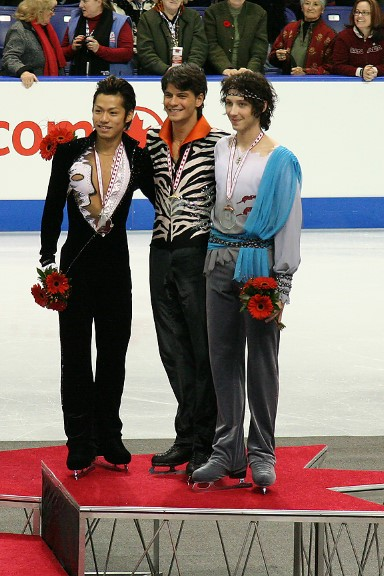
- The men's podium
- Type: Grand Prix
- Date: November 2 – 5
- Season: 2006–07
- Location: Victoria, British Columbia
- Venue: Save On Foods Memorial Centre

Champions
- Men's singles: (Switzerland) Stéphane Lambiel
- Ladies' singles: (Canada) Joannie Rochette
- Pairs: (China) Zhang Dan / Zhang Hao
- Ice dance: (Canada) Marie-France Dubreuil / Patrice Lauzon
- Previous: 2005 Skate Canada International
- Next: 2007 Skate Canada International
- Previous Grand Prix: 2006 Skate America
- Next Grand Prix: 2006 Cup of China

The 2006 Skate Canada International was the second event of six in the 2006–07 ISU Grand Prix of Figure Skating, a senior-level international invitational competition series. It was held at the Save-on-Foods Memorial Centre in Victoria, British Columbia on November 2–5. Medals were awarded in the disciplines of men's singles, ladies' singles, pair skating, and ice dancing. Skaters earned points toward qualifying for the 2006–07 Grand Prix Final.

== Results ==
=== Men ===
Rank	Name	Nation	Total points	SP		FS	
1	Stéphane Lambiel	Switzerland	210.70	7	64.45	1	146.25
2	Daisuke Takahashi	Japan	208.21	1	78.80	2	129.41
3	Johnny Weir	United States	198.70	2	76.28	4	122.42
4	Shawn Sawyer	Canada	195.17	6	66.75	3	128.42
5	Tomáš Verner	Czech Republic	192.15	3	71.30	5	120.85
6	Yannick Ponsero	France	189.46	4	69.05	6	120.41
7	Vaughn Chipeur	Canada	184.06	5	67.24	7	116.82
8	Marc Andre Craig	Canada	168.32	8	61.33	10	106.99
9	Jamal Othman	Switzerland	167.22	11	56.30	8	110.92
10	Sergei Voronov	Russia	165.73	9	58.35	9	107.38
11	Geoffry Varner	United States	148.57	10	57.15	11	91.42

=== Ladies ===
Rank	Name	Nation	Total points	SP		FS	
1	Joannie Rochette	Canada	173.86	5	55.60	1	118.26
2	Fumie Suguri	Japan	168.76	2	58.52	2	110.24
3	Yuna Kim	South Korea	168.48	1	62.68	4	105.80
4	Alissa Czisny	United States	163.69	4	56.12	3	107.57
5	Susanna Pöykiö	Finland	161.58	3	57.62	5	103.96
6	Mira Leung	Canada	150.92	6	52.14	7	98.78
7	Yoshie Onda	Japan	146.95	11	43.16	6	103.79
8	Xu Binshu	China	142.70	7	48.82	8	93.88
9	Lesley Hawker	Canada	136.68	8	45.02	9	91.66
10	Alisa Drei	Finland	121.65	12	40.46	10	81.19
11	Tuğba Karademir	Turkey	112.09	9	44.14	11	67.95
12	Katy Taylor	United States	110.57	10	43.16	12	67.41

=== Pairs ===
Rank	Name	Nation	Total points	SP		FS	
1	Zhang Dan / Zhang Hao	China	190.97	1	69.54	1	121.43
2	Rena Inoue / John Baldwin	United States	166.32	3	55.20	2	111.12
3	Valérie Marcoux / Craig Buntin	Canada	166.19	2	58.14	3	108.05
4	Elizabeth Putnam / Sean Wirtz	Canada	158.71	4	53.82	4	104.89
5	Tiffany Vise / Derek Trent	United States	150.46	5	49.50	5	100.96
6	Kendra Moyle / Andy Seitz	United States	135.96	7	46.38	6	89.58
7	Jessica Miller / Ian Moram	Canada	133.06	8	44.58	7	88.48
8	Angelika Pylkina / Niklas Hogner	Sweden	131.17	6	47.02	8	84.15
9	Rumiana Spassova / Stanimir Todorov	Bulgaria	110.11	9	39.08	9	71.03

=== Ice dancing ===
Rank	Name	Nation	Total points	CD		OD		FD	
1	Marie-France Dubreuil / Patrice Lauzon	Canada	196.68	1	38.83	1	59.04	1	98.81
2	Tessa Virtue / Scott Moir	Canada	171.92	3	29.51	2	54.12	3	88.29
3	Federica Faiella / Massimo Scali	Italy	170.73	2	33.19	5	49.15	2	88.39
4	Meryl Davis / Charlie White	United States	162.66	8	25.53	3	52.30	4	84.83
5	Anastasia Platonova / Andrei Maximishin	Russia	157.45	4	27.87	4	49.60	5	79.98
6	Kimberly Navarro / Brent Bommentre	United States	152.57	6	26.95	6	47.78	6	77.84
7	Chantal Lefebvre / Arseni Markov	Canada	145.12	9	25.31	7	44.33	7	75.48
8	Natalia Mikhailova / Arkadi Sergeev	Russia	140.97	5	27.16	8	43.97	9	69.84
9	Trina Pratt / Todd Gilles	United States	139.44	7	25.78	10	38.81	8	74.85
10	Kamila Hájková / David Vincour	Czech Republic	127.70	11	22.96	9	39.93	10	64.81
11	Yu Xiaoyang / Wang Chen	China	126.36	10	25.13	11	38.27	11	62.96
