= 2012 ISU World Team Trophy in Figure Skating =

2012 World Team Trophy
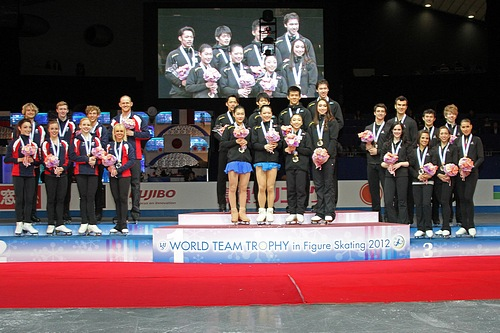
- The medal ceremony at the 2012 World Team Trophy
- Type: ISU Event
- Date: April 19 – 22
- Season: 2011–12
- Location: Tokyo, Japan
- Host: Japan Skating Federation
- Venue: Yoyogi National Gymnasium
- Previous: 2009 ISU World Team Trophy
- Next: 2013 ISU World Team Trophy

The 2012 ISU World Team Trophy was an international team figure skating competition in the 2011–12 season. Participating countries selected two men's single skaters, two ladies' single skaters, one pair and one ice dancing entry to compete in a team format with points based on the skaters' placement.

== Background ==
The event was originally scheduled to be held on April 14–17, 2011 in Yokohama, Japan, but the Tōhoku earthquake and tsunami led to the event's postponement. It was rescheduled to April 19–22, 2012 in Tokyo, Japan.

Japan qualified in first place with 7,891 points, followed by Canada (6,943), Russia (6,807), the United States (6,399), Italy (5,412), and France (5,214). The total prize money at the World Team Trophy paid by the Japan Skating Federation is US$1 million, the highest of any ISU event.

World Team Trophy medals are awarded to the national teams. Skaters who place in the top three of their discipline receive gifts rather than individual medals.

== Entries ==
Country	Men	Ladies	Pairs	Ice dancing
Canada	Patrick Chan; Kevin Reynolds	Amelie Lacoste; Cynthia Phaneuf	Meagan Duhamel / Eric Radford	Tessa Virtue / Scott Moir
France	Florent Amodio; Brian Joubert	Maé-Bérénice Méité; Yrétha Silété	Daria Popova / Bruno Massot	Nathalie Péchalat / Fabian Bourzat
Italy	Paolo Bacchini; Samuel Contesti	Carolina Kostner; Valentina Marchei	Stefania Berton / Ondřej Hotárek	Anna Cappellini / Luca Lanotte
Japan	Takahiko Kozuka; Daisuke Takahashi	Kanako Murakami; Akiko Suzuki	Narumi Takahashi / Mervin Tran	Cathy Reed / Chris Reed
Russia	Zhan Bush; Maxim Kovtun	Alena Leonova; Adelina Sotnikova	Vera Bazarova / Yuri Larionov	Elena Ilinykh / Nikita Katsalapov
United States	Jeremy Abbott; Adam Rippon	Ashley Wagner; Gracie Gold	Caydee Denney / John Coughlin	Meryl Davis / Charlie White

== Results ==
=== Competition notes ===
Daisuke Takahashi set a world record to win the men's short program, scoring 94.00 points. Carolina Kostner won the ladies' short program, while Meryl Davis / Charlie White were first in the short dance. On the second day of competition, Takahashi won the men's event, Davis and White won the ice dancing event, and Narumi Takahashi / Mervin Tran won the pairs' short program. On the final day of the World Team Trophy, Akiko Suzuki won the ladies' event and Vera Bazarova / Yuri Larionov the pairs' event. Team Japan won the title overall, with Team USA taking the silver medal. Team Canada and Team France were tied, with Canada winning the tiebreaker to claim the bronze medal. Team France won the organizing committee's team spirit award.

=== Team standings ===
Rank	Nation	Total team points
1	Japan	55
2	United States	53
3	Canada	42
4	France	42
5	Russia	39
6	Italy	39

=== Men ===
Rank	Nation	Name	Total points	SP		FS		Team points
1	Japan	Daisuke Takahashi	276.72	1	94.00	1	182.72	12
2	Canada	Patrick Chan	260.46	2	84.69	2	170.65	11
3	France	Brian Joubert	239.64	4	84.69	4	154.95	10
4	France	Florent Amodio	238.33	5	81.84	3	156.49	9
5	United States	Jeremy Abbott	234.37	3	86.98	7	147.39	8
6	Japan	Takahiko Kozuka	225.30	8	73.61	5	151.69	7
7	United States	Adam Rippon	222.73	7	74.93	6	147.80	6
8	Canada	Kevin Reynolds	221.31	6	78.82	8	142.49	5
9	Italy	Samuel Contesti	210.00	9	73.38	9	136.62	4
10	Russia	Zhan Bush	178.26	12	58.67	10	119.59	3
11	Italy	Paolo Bacchini	173.85	10	62.26	11	111.59	2
12	Russia	Maxim Kovtun	172.46	11	60.93	12	111.53	1

=== Ladies ===
Rank	Nation	Name	Total points	SP		FS		Team points
1	Japan	Akiko Suzuki	187.79	2	67.51	2	120.28	12
2	Italy	Carolina Kostner	185.72	1	69.48	3	116.24	11
3	United States	Ashley Wagner	179.81	5	57.52	1	122.29	10
4	Russia	Adelina Sotnikova	169.69	6	56.12	4	113.57	9
5	United States	Gracie Gold	169.65	4	59.07	5	110.58	8
6	Japan	Kanako Murakami	159.62	3	63.78	8	95.84	7
7	Russia	Alena Leonova	153.71	9	50.92	6	102.79	6
8	Italy	Valentina Marchei	152.59	8	53.52	7	99.07	5
9	France	Maé-Bérénice Méité	144.15	11	48.57	9	95.58	4
10	Canada	Amelie Lacoste	143.88	10	48.61	10	95.27	3
11	France	Yrétha Silété	138.63	7	54.83	11	83.80	2
12	Canada	Cynthia Phaneuf	126.95	12	45.99	12	80.96	1

=== Pairs ===
Rank	Nation	Name	Total points	SP		FS		Team points
1	Russia	Vera Bazarova / Yuri Larionov	180.70	2	62.02	1	118.68	12
2	Canada	Meagan Duhamel / Eric Radford	177.62	4	59.27	2	118.35	11
3	Japan	Narumi Takahashi / Mervin Tran	177.56	1	64.92	4	112.64	10
4	United States	Caydee Denney / John Coughlin	175.98	5	58.93	3	117.05	9
5	Italy	Stefania Berton / Ondřej Hotárek	158.74	3	59.28	5	99.46	8
6	France	Daria Popova / Bruno Massot	119.10	6	42.07	6	77.03	7

=== Ice dancing ===
Rank	Nation	Name	Total points	SD		FD		Team points
1	United States	Meryl Davis / Charlie White	183.36	1	72.18	1	111.18	12
2	Canada	Tessa Virtue / Scott Moir	177.76	2	69.93	2	107.83	11
3	France	Nathalie Péchalat / Fabian Bourzat	167.83	3	66.57	3	101.26	10
4	Italy	Anna Cappellini / Luca Lanotte	162.00	4	63.70	4	98.30	9
5	Russia	Elena Ilinykh / Nikita Katsalapov	146.84	5	60.44	5	86.40	8
6	Japan	Cathy Reed / Chris Reed	119.55	6	49.47	6	70.08	7

== Prize money ==
Placement	Prize money per team
1st	200,000
2nd	170,000
3rd	160,000
4th	150,000
5th	140,000
6th	130,000
Each single skater receives 15% of the amount earned by his or her country. Each pair or ice dancing couple receives 20% to be split between the two. Of these amounts, their skating association may retain 10%. Total prize money: US$1,000,000.
