= Anastasia Platonova =

Russian ice dancer (born 1986)

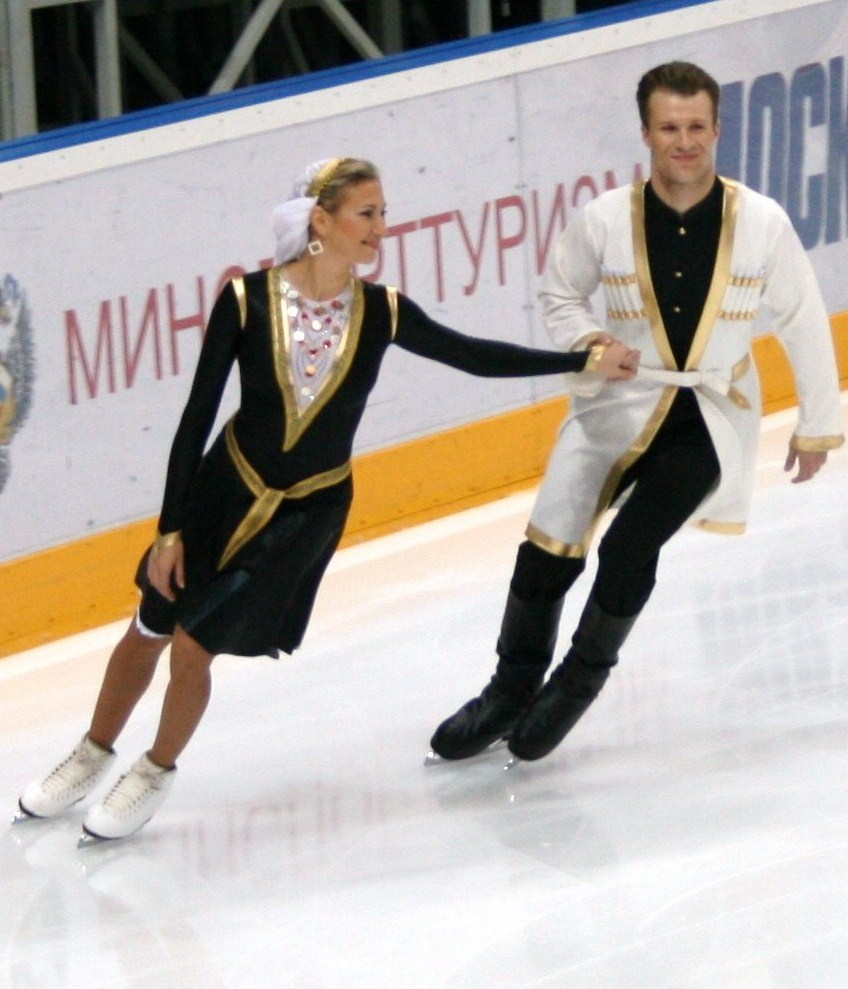
- Platonova and Grachev in 2009.

Personal information
- Full name: Anastasia Alexandrovna Platonova
- Born: 28 August 1986 (age 40) Moscow, Russian SFSR, Soviet Union
- Height: 1.68 m (5 ft 6 in)

Figure skating career
- Country: Russia
- Began skating: 1990
- Retired: 2010
Medal record
Representing Russia
Figure skating: Ice dancing
Winter Universiade
Silver medal – second place	2007 Turin	Ice dancing

Anastasia Alexandrovna Platonova (Russian: Анастасия Александровна Платонова; born 28 August 1986) is a Russian former competitive ice dancer. With Alexander Grachev, she is a two-time (2008–2009) Finlandia Trophy silver medalist and 2008 NRW Trophy champion. With Andrei Maximishin, she is the 2006 Karl Schäfer Memorial silver medalist and won three gold medals in the ISU Junior Grand Prix series.

== Career ==
Early in her career, Platonova competed with Dmitri Ponomarev.

Platonova competed with Andrei Maximishin from 2003 to 2007. They placed 6th at the 2005 World Junior Championships and 5th in 2006, as well as competing twice at the ISU Junior Grand Prix Final. Platonova and Maximishin placed 5th at 2006 Skate Canada International, their senior Grand Prix debut. They parted ways due to Platonova's back problem. They were coached by Alexei Gorshkov in Odintsovo.

After recuperating from her back issues, Platonova teamed up with Alexander Grachev. They were initially coached by Elena Kustarova and Svetlana Alexeeva in Moscow. In the summer of 2009, they switched to Alexander Zhulin and Oleg Volkov. They decided to retire from competition in 2010.

== Programs ==
=== With Grachev ===
Season	Original dance	Free dance
2009–2010	Dagestan folk dance: Lezginka	Fantasie for piano in D minor by Wolfgang Amadeus Mozart
2008–2009	Blues: St. James Infirmary Blues; Swing: Woodside Riot	Nocturne by Arno Babadganian

=== With Maximishin ===
Season	Original dance	Free dance
2006–2007	Tango by Gotan Project	Legenda Flamenco by Didulia
2005–2006	Cha Cha: Caramelo; Mambo: Bye Bye	Xotica by René Dupéré
2004–2005	Quickstep from the "Muppet Show"; Slow foxtrot; Quickstep from the "Muppet Show"	Oriental dance

== Competitive highlights ==
GP: Grand Prix; JGP: Junior Grand Prix

=== With Grachev ===
International
Event	2007–08	2008–09	2009–10
GP Cup of Russia		7th	5th
Finlandia Trophy		2nd	2nd
NRW Trophy		1st	
National
Russian Championships	5th	5th	7th

=== With Maximishin ===
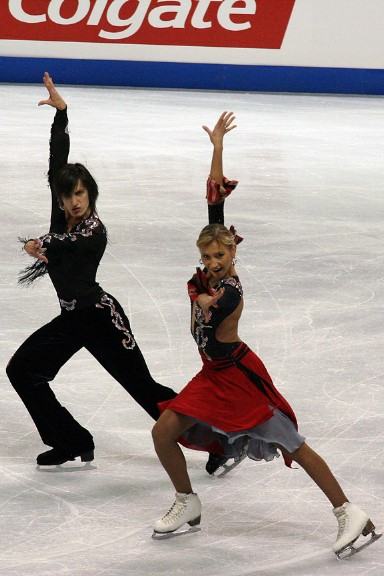
Platonova and Maximishin at the 2006 Skate Canada International

International
Event	2003–04	2004–05	2005–06	2006–07
GP Cup of Russia				9th
GP Skate Canada				5th
Schäfer Memorial				2nd
Universiade				2nd
International: Junior
Junior Worlds		6th	5th	
JGP Final		6th	6th	
JGP Bulgaria	3rd		3rd	
JGP Japan			1st	
JGP Romania		1st		
JGP Slovenia	7th			
JGP Ukraine		1st		
National
Russian Champ.				4th
Russian Jr. Champ.		3rd	3rd	

=== With Ponomarev ===
International
Event	2002–2003
JGP Serbia	10th
