= 2010 Winter Olympic ice dance controversy =

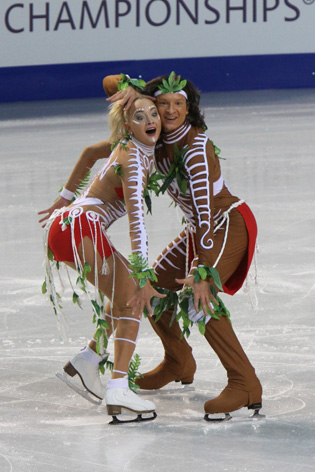
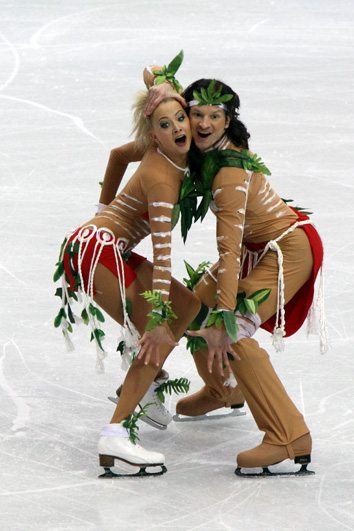
Oksana Domnina and Maxim Shabalin of Russia provoked controversy with their choice of Australian Aboriginal music and costume design for their original dance. On the left are Domnina and Shabalin as they appeared at the 2010 European Figure Skating Championships, and on the right, at the 2010 Winter Olympics.

The ice dance competition at the 2010 Winter Olympics was held at the Pacific Coliseum in Vancouver, Canada, from 19 to 22 February. Controversy arose from the decision of Oksana Domnina and Maxim Shabalin of Russia to perform their original dance to what they claimed was Australian Aboriginal music while wearing costumes which many found offensive. Despite negative reactions from the Australian press, members of the Aboriginal and Torres Strait Islander communities, and members of the First Nations in British Columbia, in whose ancestral territory the Winter Olympics were being staged, Domnina and Shabalin finished in third place, winning the bronze medals.

== Background ==
The ice dance competition at the 2010 Winter Olympics consisted of three segments: the compulsory dance, the original dance, and the free dance. The competition was held from 19 to 22 February at the Pacific Coliseum in Vancouver, British Columbia, in Canada. The theme of the original dance was folk or country, and while it was recommended that couples use traditional folk or country music and dance styles native to their own nations, this was not a requirement.

Oksana Domnina and Maxim Shabalin of Russia had won the 2009 World Figure Skating Championships and entered the Olympic season as the presumptive favorites to win the ice dance event in Vancouver. However, the couple missed the first half of the season after Shabalin injured his knee. They debuted their routine at the 2010 Russian Figure Skating Championships, which they won. Domnina and Shabalin described their original dance as being set to what they described as Australian Aboriginal music. The idea for the routine was suggested to them by their coach Natalia Linichuk, with the couple at first declining, only to later change their minds after listening to the musical arrangement again. The musical arrangement featured heavy drums, a didgeridoo, and vocal chanting; and their costumes consisted of dark flesh-toned bodysuits with red loincloths, decorated with white markings and faux green leaves, as well as face paint. They performed this routine again at the 2010 European Figure Skating Championships, which they also won, and where the audience gave them a "warm reception" at its conclusion.

== Controversy over the program ==
=== Reactions from Australia, Canada, and First Nations communities ===
The outrage concerning Domnina and Shabalin's routine came between their debut performance at the Russian national championships and the European Championships, making its way to the Australian media and Aboriginal and Torres Strait Islander communities days before their performance in Tallinn. Worimi elder Bev Manton, chairwoman of the New South Wales Aboriginal Land Council, wrote that Domnina and Shabalin's costumes were "no more authentic or Aboriginal than the shiploads of cheap Aboriginal tourist trinkets that pour into [Australia] from overseas". Manton found their depiction of Aboriginal and Torres Strait Islander culture offensive, although she did not believe that was their intention. She cited the brown bodysuits as problematic and likened their appearance to blackface. She added further: "They are not, as they state, wearing 'authentic Aboriginal paint markings'. They are wearing white body paint in designs they dreamed up after reading about Aboriginal Australians on the internet." Just as the designs were not from the Australian First Nations community, neither was the music, as she explained, since it was composed by Sheila Chandra, a Briton of Indian descent. Sol Bellear, also of the New South Wales Aboriginal Land Council, said the routine was "yet another example of the Aboriginal people of Australia being exploited". He also stated that he intended to send a letter of protest to the Russian Embassy in Canberra, noting that "it's not just intellectual property. It's straight-out cultural theft." Additionally, members of the First Nations community in British Columbia were upset with the way Indigenous culture was being represented on a global platform, with former First Nations chief of the Neskonlith Indian Band Arthur Manuel stating, "People make fun of us and it is painful; that is something [Domnina and Shabalin] should have been very cognizant of".

Belinda Noonan, four-time Australian national champion in pair skating and Australian figure skating commentator, was critical of Domnina and Shabalin's routine, calling the costumes "dreadful" and criticizing their lack of research. She also criticized the musical arrangement, noting the use of Chandra's music versus that of an Aboriginal and Torres Strait Islander artist with "some didgeridoo [put] in a couple of places." Noonan stated that she had contacted Domnina and Shabalin's team for more information about their program, but had not received a response.

The Aboriginal and Torres Strait Islander creative arts scene was also displeased with the routine. Stephen Page, then-artistic director of the Bangarra Dance Theatre who coordinated the Indigenous sections of the opening and closing ceremony of the 2000 Summer Olympics, felt the entire routine was disrespectful, and when asked about his thoughts on its concept, stated: "I believe now that we just tend to... bastardize any form of culture." He also said that it looked "stupid" and that "the elders in the bush would be laughing... saying, 'Look how stupid these fellas are' because they've got it all wrong." Page also criticized the choreography as "trying to emulate the token savage caveman".

Danielle O'Brien and Gregory Merriman, an Australian ice dance team, had also chosen to perform their original dance to Aboriginal and Torres Strait Islander music, but they had sought input from Aboriginal and Torres Strait Islander musicians, choreographers, and artists to ensure the dance was designed and performed accurately and respectfully. When asked about their routine after the 2010 World Figure Skating Championships, O'Brien stated that their songs were by Aboriginal and Torres Strait Islander musicians Scott Wilson, James Drury, and David Hudson; and their costumes were designed by the Aboriginal and Torres Strait Islander art company ThulliiDreaming. Victor Kraatz, the 2003 world champion and ten-time Canadian national champion in ice dance with his former partner Shae-Lynn Bourne, had worked with O'Brien and Merriman to help develop their routine. He explained that Aboriginal and Torres Strait Islanders did not wear red except for ceremonial purposes, that women did not wear body paint, and that only men traditionally performed ceremonial dances.

=== Response by Domnina, Shabalin and Russian figure skating ===
When Domnina and Shabalin were questioned about their program during the European Championships, Domnina said that they were unaware of any controversy concerning their program. Shabalin said that he did perform research on the internet for their routine, but claimed, "Our dance is not specifically an Australian Aboriginal dance; it is an aboriginal dance," and they decided to create the routine because they "wanted to be different." Domnina also defended their costumes. Domnina added that they did not want to create another Slavic-style program and chose it because they "immediately fell in love with it".

The Figure Skating Federation of Russia expressed shock at criticism of the program, stating that all teams had to perform a "world" dance, pointing to the Argentine tango and Viennese waltz as examples of routines performed without controversy. Oleg Ovsyannikov, the 1988 Winter Olympic silver medalist in ice dance, defended Domnina and Shabalin's intentions, saying that they were "not trying to hurt anyone's feelings", while also acknowledging "these kinds of dances are really rather typical [in ice dance]".

=== Before the Olympic Games ===
Upon hearing that Domnina and Shabalin intended to perform the same routine at the 2010 Winter Olympics, representatives of the Four Host First Nations – the Lilʼwat, the Musqueam, the Squamish, and the Tsleil-Waututh – offered to meet with them. These First Nations, in whose traditional land the 2010 Winter Olympics were held, were recognized as partners in the planning of the Olympics by the Vancouver Organizing Committee. They recommended that Domnina and Shabalin contact Aboriginal and Torres Strait Islander communities in Australia for feedback before coming to the Olympics. Both Domnina and Shabalin were gifted blankets by the Four Host First Nations communities upon their arrival in Vancouver.

Shabalin had told the media a week before the start of the event that they had changed their costumes, a decision that was welcomed by members of the Aboriginal and Torres Strait Islander communities. However, Russian journalists stated that they would continue to perform the original routine and choreography, a point confirmed by Shabalin after a meeting with the First Nations representatives in Vancouver. Despite Shabalin originally saying their costumes had changed, their coach Natalia Linichuk backtracked on this statement with the Australian media prior to their performance in Vancouver, saying that Domnina and Shabalin would wear the same costumes as before, "but a little less." Linichuk was also seen before the original dance carrying multiple photos of Aboriginal and Torres Strait Islander people in the media zone, repeatedly saying, "We didn't make this up."

Sheila Chandra, the original composer of the music used by Domnina and Shabalin, was unhappy with her song being used in the routine. She subsequently made a complaint to the International Olympic Committee and the Figure Skating Federation of Russia a week before the ice dance competition in Vancouver, with the intention of preventing her song from being used. Chandra stated that it was "inappropriate" for her song to be performed as it was. She also stated that neither Domnina, Shabalin, Linichuk, nor the Russian skating federation had sought permission from her to use her song.

== Olympic performance ==
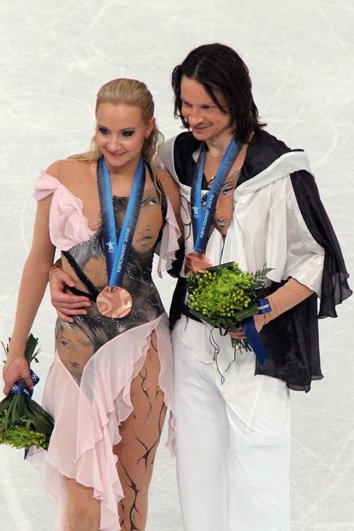
Oksana Domnina and Maxim Shabalin with their Olympic bronze medals

The original dance was held on 21 February. Oksana Domnina and Maxim Shabalin finished in third place. Christine Brennan, a sports reporter for USA Today, wrote that "as bad as they looked, they skated even worse, with garish, halting moves". Mandi Bierly of Entertainment Weekly criticized the International Skating Union for their choice of theme, singling out Domnina and Shabalin's program specifically as the reason viewers might never watch the sport again. She described it as "arguably the worst concept for a program on ice ever" and wrote that "the crazy smiles they flashed... made ice dancing seem like a joke." Tracee Hamilton of The Washington Post also criticized the decision to do a folk theme, specifically singling out Domnina and Shabalin's routine and also comparing the event to an American high school prom. Hamilton also argued that Domnina and Shabalin could have performed a traditional Russian dance, as their fellow Russian competitors had done. NBC commentator Tom Hammond criticized the cultural inaccuracy of the program.

Domnina and Shabalin had made some modifications to their costumes from the ones they had worn at the 2010 European Championships, including doing away with the face paint and wearing lighter-toned bodysuits. However, they instead added more green leaves, styled to resemble eucalyptus leaves, to their costumes, despite warnings from Aboriginal and Torres Strait Islander elders that the use of eucalyptus leaves on the original costume was inaccurate. Shabalin stated that they changed the tone of the bodysuits after the negative feedback from the media and "changed our routine about five to ten percent." Shabalin also claimed that their coach, Linichuk, conducted more research into Aboriginal and Torres Strait Islander culture and suggested that they had contacted Australian First Nations elders, although he stated that no one can be one hundred percent authentic. He also reiterated that they did not intend to offend and that the music was selected because it was "fair and friendly."

The Australians and Canadians in the crowd during the event did not give the performance the same reception it had received in Russia and at the European Championships. Mahira Lakshman from CBC News reported that the spectators in the Pacific Coliseum remained mostly silent, with occasional boos heard during the performance and gasps from the crowd when the costumes were revealed. Australians who attended the event stated that they felt the routine was "quite disrespectful" and were offended that the routine continued to be performed despite the outcry. Their musical arrangement was criticized for having "no recognizable melody", making the music difficult to follow and instead relying on heavy drums, didgeridoo riffs, and screams and grunts as vocals.

Domnina and Shabalin's routine was consistently compared to that of eventual silver medalists Meryl Davis and Charlie White of the United States, who performed a Bollywood-style routine, which had received acclaim from viewers in India and Southeast Asia. The team had worked with an Indian choreographer and wore authentic Indian garments. Although both routines were described as energetic, the lack of difficulty in Domnina and Shabalin's routine was noticeable compared to that of Davis and White, as well as the eventual Olympic champions, Tessa Virtue and Scott Moir of Canada.

The free dance was held on 22 February. Ultimately, Virtue and Moir won the gold medals, while Davis and White won the silver, and Domnina and Shabalin won the bronze. Domnina and Shabalin's free dance was described as highly entertaining and theatrical, but lacking in the skating skills, power, and innovation that the gold and silver medalists demonstrated.

2010 Olympic ice dance event medalists
Rank	Team	Nation	Total	CD		OD		FD	
1st place, gold medalist(s)	Tessa Virtue; Scott Moir	Canada	221.57	2	42.74	1	68.41	1	110.42
2nd place, silver medalist(s)	Meryl Davis; Charlie White	United States	215.74	3	41.47	2	67.08	2	107.19
3rd place, bronze medalist(s)	Oksana Domnina; Maxim Shabalin	Russia	207.64	1	43.76	3	62.84	3	101.04
