= Angelina Telegina =

Russian ice dancer

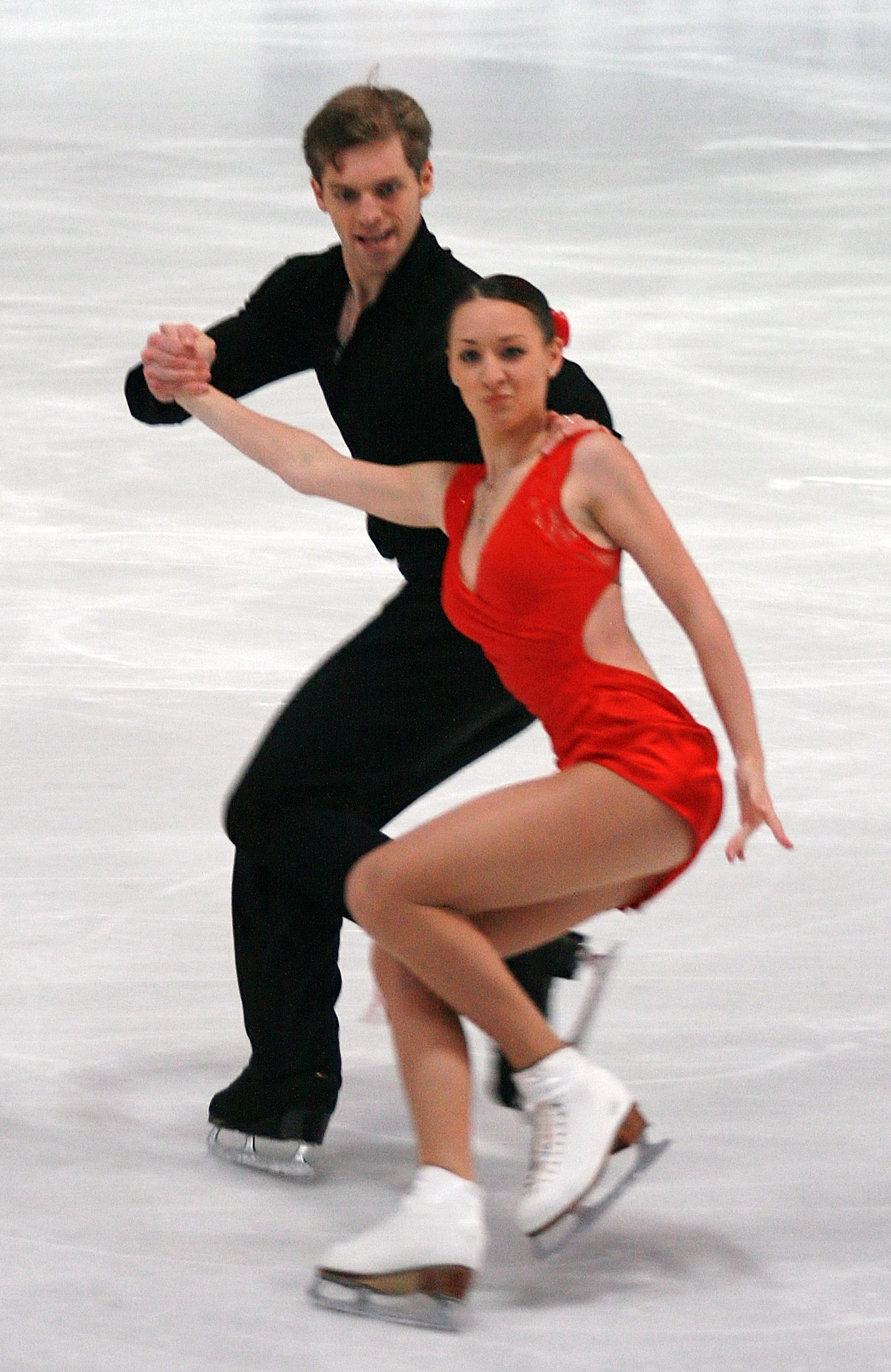
- Telegina/Japaridze at the 2013 Nebelhorn Trophy

Personal information
- Full name: Angelina Vitalyevna Telegina
- Born: 8 March 1992 (age 34) Slavuta, Ukraine
- Height: 1.69 m (5 ft 6 1/2 in)

Figure skating career
- Country: Georgia
- Partner: Otar Japaridze
- Coach: Evgeni Platov
- Began skating: 1999
- Retired: 2014

Angelina Vitalyevna Telegina (Russian: Ангелина Витальевна Телегина; born 8 March 1992) is a former competitive ice dancer. In February 2012, she teamed up with Otar Japaridze to compete for Georgia. They appeared at three ISU Championships, achieving their best result at the 2013 Europeans in Zagreb, where they qualified for the free dance. Earlier in her career, Telegina competed for Russia with Viktor Adoniev and Valentin Molotov.

== Programs ==
(with Japaridze)

Season	Short dance	Free dance
2013–14	Quickstep: Show Me How You Burlesque (from "Burlesque") by Christina Aguilera; Foxtrot: Fever by Beyoncé; Quickstep: Show Me How You Burlesque (from "Burlesque") by Christina Aguilera	Building the Bullet by Luis Bacalov; Oblivion by Gidon Kremer; Concierto Para Quinteto by Astor Piazzolla
2012–13	Schei-we-dei-wi-du by Die Mayrhofner	Tron: Legacy by Daft Punk; The Grid; Adagio; Encom Part 2

== Competitive highlights ==
=== With Japaridze for Georgia ===
International
Event	2012–13	2013–14
World Champ.		31st
European Champ.	20th	27th
Golden Spin of Zagreb	12th	
Nebelhorn Trophy		11th
Ondrej Nepela Memorial	9th	
Ukrainian Open		4th
U.S. Classic		11th

=== With Molotov for Russia ===
International
Event	2009–10	2010–11
Winter Universiade		WD
Santa Claus Cup	2nd J	
National
Russian Championships		6th
J: Junior level; WD: Withdrew

=== With Adoniev for Russia ===
International
Event	2008–09
ISU Junior Grand Prix in Spain	5th
