= Irina Štork =

Estonian ice dancer

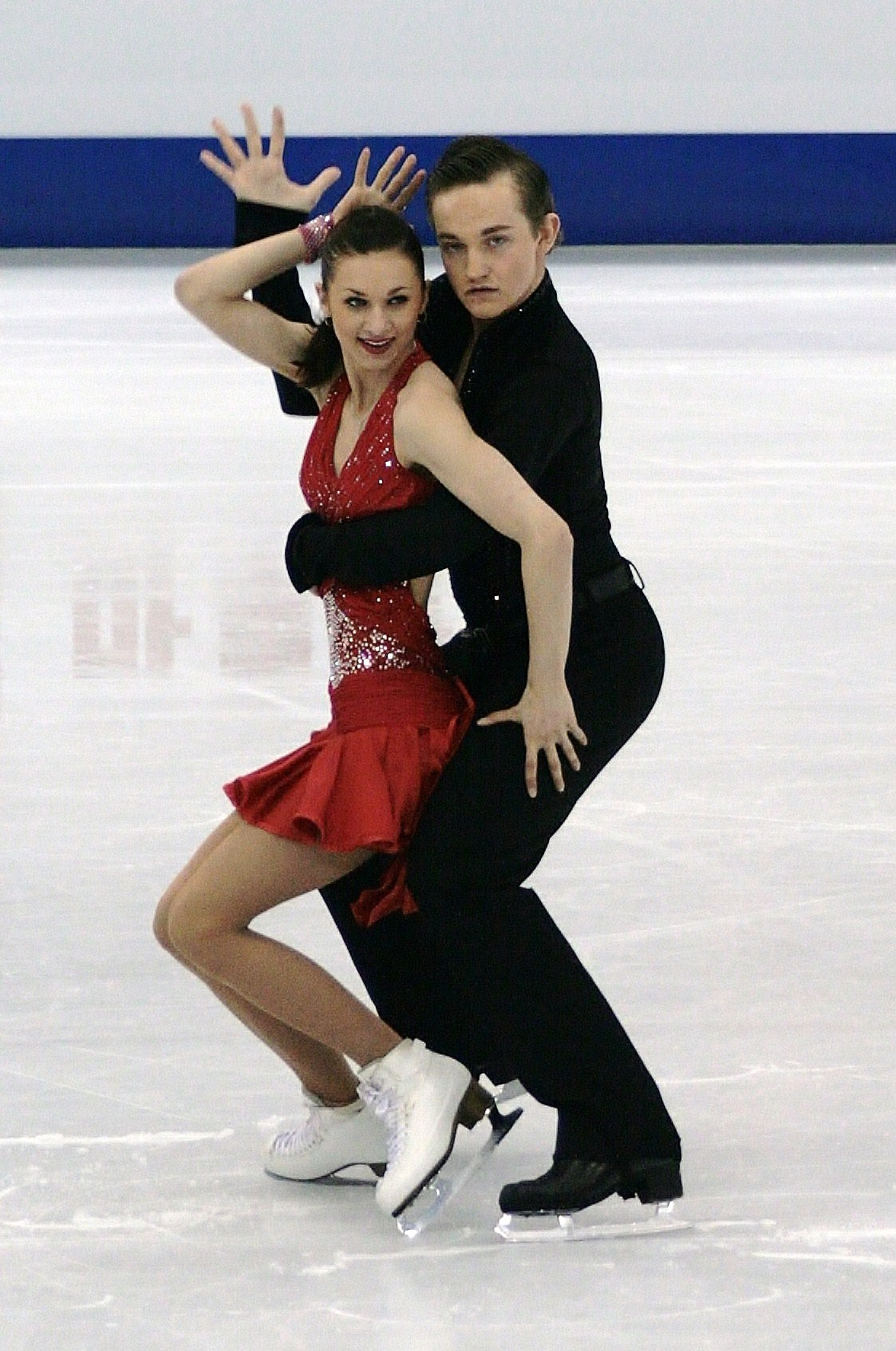
- Štork and Rand in 2012

Personal information
- Born: 7 April 1993 (age 33) Tallinn, Estonia
- Height: 1.69 m (5 ft 7 in)

Figure skating career
- Country: Estonia
- Partner: Taavi Rand
- Coach: Lea Rand, Elena Kustarova, Olga Riabinina
- Skating club: Jääkild FSC
- Began skating: 1997
- Retired: 2015

Irina Štork (born 7 April 1993) is an Estonian former ice dancer. With partner Taavi Rand, she is the 2013 International Cup of Nice bronze medalist, the 2013 Ukrainian Open silver medalist, and a four-time Estonian national champion.

== Career ==
Early in her career, Štork skated with Alexei Trokhlev and Roman Zakharov.

She began competing with Taavi Rand in the 2004–05 season. They debuted on the ISU Junior Grand Prix circuit in 2006 and placed 22nd in their first appearance at Junior Worlds in 2007. The following season, the duo again finished 22nd at Junior Worlds. They parted ways at the end of the season.

Prior to the 2009–10 season, Shork and Rand decided to re-form their partnership. They competed on the junior level in the first half of the season. At the 2009 Nebelhorn Trophy, Rand's brother Kristjan Rand and his American partner Caitlin Mallory earned a spot for Estonia in the Olympic ice dancing event. Mallory/Rand ultimately decided not to use it because she would have to renounce her U.S. citizenship in order to receive Estonian citizenship (required only at the Olympics). Estonia gave the spot to its second ice dance team, Štork/Rand. Making their senior international debut, they placed 23rd at the 2010 Winter Olympics in Vancouver.

Štork/Rand returned to the junior level for the first half of the 2010–11 season, placing 6th and 8th at their two JGP events. They also appeared at one senior event, the 2011 European Championships, finishing 21st. They ended their season at the 2011 World Junior Championships where they placed 10th.

In the 2011–12 season, Štork/Rand continued to move between the junior and senior levels. They won the silver medal at a JGP event in Estonia. They then placed 14th at the 2012 European Championships, 11th at the 2012 World Junior Championships, and 22nd at the 2012 World Championships.

In 2012–13, Štork/Rand won their first senior international medals—bronze at the 2013 Cup of Nice and silver at the Volvo Open Cup. They placed a career-best 11th at the 2013 European Championships before finishing 25th at the 2013 World Championships.

In 2015, Štork announced her competitive retirement.

== Programs ==
(with Rand)

Season	Short dance	Free dance
2014–2015	Malagueña Salerosa; Malagueña performed by Brian Setzer	Exogenesis: Symphony Act III by Muse
2013–2014	Booty Swing by Parov Stelar; Sixteen Tons by Paul Robeson; Do You Thing by Basement Jaxx	The Umbrellas of Cherbourg by Michel Legrand
2012–2013	Polka: Cotton Eyed Joe; Waltz: Old Country Waltz; Polka: Cotton Eyed Joe	A Los Amigos
2011–2012	Rhumba: Bésame Mucho; Samba: Mujer Latina by Thalía; Cha Cha: El Diablo anda Suelto; Samba: Mujer Latina by Thalía	The Story of Michael Strogoff (soundtrack)
2010–2011	Waltz: Once Upon a December (from Anastasia)	El Dia Que Me Quieras by Raúl Di Blasio
	Original dance	
2009–2010	Estonian folk: Pärnu Polka; Waltz by Erni Kasesalu; Pärnu Polka	Nothing Else Matters by Metallica; Mind's Eye by Vasyl Popadiuk; Harpsichord Concerto No. 1 in D minor by Johann Sebastian Bach
2007–2008	Irish jig: Losing My Religion by R.E.M.	Equilibrium by Klaus Badelt, James Cullum
2006–2007	That Lucky Old Sun by Louis Armstrong	It's a Dog's Life; City Lights; The Gold Rush by Charlie Chaplin

== Competitive highlights ==
(with Rand)

Results
International
Event	2004–05	2005–06	2006–07	2007–08	2009–10	2010–11	2011–12	2012–13	2013–14	2014–15
Olympics					23rd					
Worlds							22nd	25th		23rd
Europeans						21st	14th	11th	14th	13th
Cup of Nice								3rd		
Finlandia								5th	6th	
Ice Challenge								6th		
Nebelhorn									19th	
Toruń Cup										5th
Ukrainian Open									2nd	
Volvo Cup								2nd	5th	
International: Junior
Junior Worlds			22nd	22nd		10th	11th			
JGP Austria				10th		8th				
JGP Czech Rep.			11th							
JGP Estonia				10th			2nd			
JGP Germany					17th					
JGP Great Britain						6th				
JGP Hungary					18th					
JGP Norway			13th							
JGP Romania							7th			
NRW Trophy					9th J.					
Pavel Roman		1st N.								
National
Estonian Champ.	3rd	3rd	1st J.	1st J.	1st	1st	1st	1st		1st
JGP = Junior Grand Prix; Levels: N. = Novice; J. = Junior
