= Otar Japaridze =

Georgian ice dancer

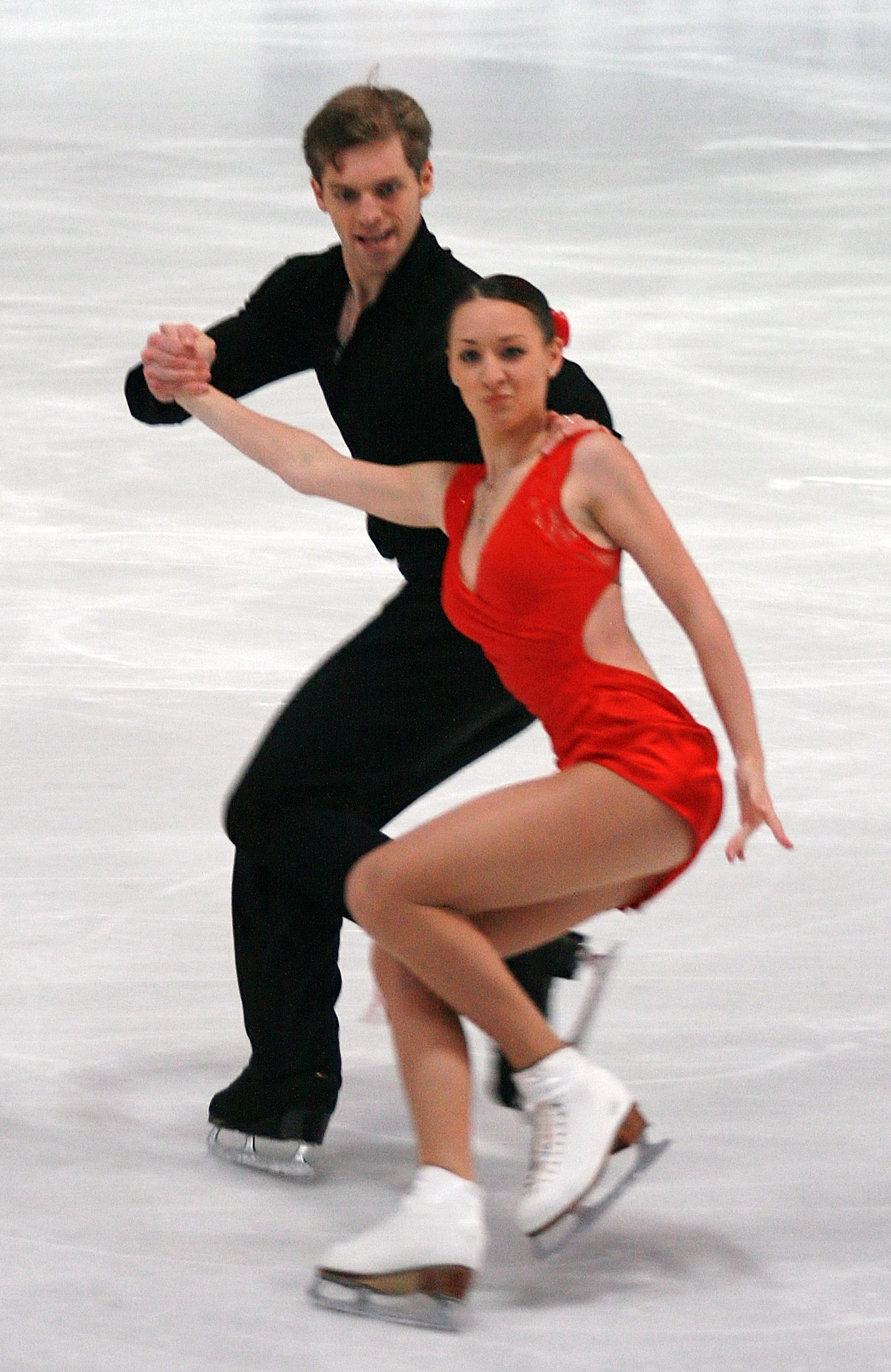

Personal information
- Born: December 23, 1987 (age 38) Tbilisi, Georgian SSR, Soviet Union
- Height: 1.83 m (6 ft 0 in)

Figure skating career
- Country: Georgia
- Partner: Angelina Telegina
- Coach: Evgeni Platov
- Skating club: Dinamo Tbilisi
- Began skating: 1993

Otar Japaridze (Georgian: ოთარ ჯაფარიძე; born December 23, 1987) is a Georgian former competitive ice dancer. With former partner Allison Reed, he represented Georgia at the 2010 Winter Olympics. He later skated with Angelina Telegina.

== Personal life ==
Otar Japaridze was born in Tbilisi, Georgian SSR, Soviet Union. His father, Irakli Japaridze, is the president of the Georgian Figure Skating Federation.

== Career ==
Japaridze competed in single skating until the age of 15 and then switched to ice dancing. From 2002 through 2004, he competed with Marina Sheltsina. They were the 2004 Georgian national champions.

From 2005 through 2007, Japaridze competed with Russian-born Ekaterina Zaikina for Georgia. They competed twice at the World Junior Championships.

In the 2007–2008 season, Japaridze competed with American ice dancer Isabella Tobias for Georgia.

In May 2009, Japaridze teamed up with American Allison Reed to compete for Georgia; they trained in Mount Laurel, New Jersey with coach and choreographer Evgeni Platov. At the 2009 Nebelhorn Trophy, they qualified a spot for Georgia for the 2010 Winter Olympics. Reed received a Georgian passport in January 2010, allowing them to compete at the 2010 Winter Olympics. Reed and Japaridze split following the 2010-11 season.

In February 2012, Japaridze teamed up with Russian ice dancer Angelina Telegina to compete for Georgia.

== Programs ==
=== With Telegina ===
Season	Short dance	Free dance
2013–14	Quickstep: Show Me How You Burlesque (from "Burlesque") by Christina Aguilera; Foxtrot: Fever by Beyoncé; Quickstep: Show Me How You Burlesque (from "Burlesque") by Christina Aguilera	Building the Bullet by Luis Bacalov; Oblivion by Gidon Kremer; Concierto Para Quinteto by Astor Piazzolla
2012–13	Schei-we-dei-wi-du by Die Mayrhofner	Tron: Legacy by Daft Punk; The Grid; Adagio; Encom Part 2

=== With Reed ===
Season	Short dance	Free dance
2010–11	Desde el Alma by Juan d'Arienzo; Building the Bullet by Luis Bacalov	The Messiah Will Come Again; Oh Pretty Woman by Gary Moore
	Original dance	
2009–10	Georgian folk dance: Bukinagari; Iloumi	Crusaders of the Light; Preliator by Yoav Goren

=== With Tobias ===
Season	Original dance	Free dance
2007–08	Two Guitars performed by Zoltan and his Gypsy Ensemble; Dark Eyes performed by Bigrock Balalaikas	Sarabande by George Frideric Handel; Furioso by Aria; Sarabande Suite by Globus

=== With Zaikina ===
Season	Original dance	Free dance
2006–07	Tango by Astor Piazzolla	Georgian folk music
2005–06	Brasiliera by Sérgio Mendes	Georgian folk music

=== With Sheltsina ===
Season	Original dance	Free dance
2004–05	Charleston; Slow foxtrot; Quickstep	Georgian folk music
2003–04	Summertime by Sam Taylor; Hound Dog	Waltz by Eugen Doga

== Results ==
JGP: Junior Grand Prix

=== With Telegina ===
International
Event	2012–13	2013–14
World Champ.		31st
European Champ.	20th	27th
Golden Spin of Zagreb	12th	
Nebelhorn Trophy		11th
Ondrej Nepela Memorial	9th	
Ukrainian Open		4th
U.S. Classic		11th

=== With Reed ===
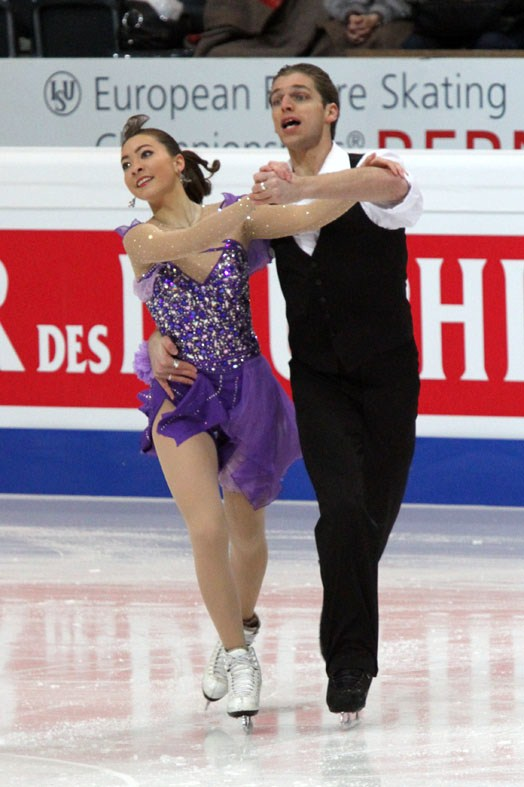
Reed/Japaridze at the 2011 European Championships

International
Event	2009–10	2010–11
Winter Olympics	22nd	
World Champ.	21st	18th
European Champ.	19th	17th
Golden Spin of Zagreb		4th
Ice Challenge		2nd
Nebelhorn Trophy	12th	
Pavel Roman Memorial	9th	

=== With Tobias ===
International
Event	2007–08
World Junior Championships	14th
JGP Germany	7th
JGP United Kingdom	6th

=== With Zaikina ===
International
Event	2005–06	2006–07
World Junior Champ.	21st	16th
JGP Netherlands		7th
JGP Romania		4th

=== With Sheltsina ===
International
Event	2002–03	2003–04
World Junior Champ.		21st
JGP Croatia		12th
JGP Slovenia		14th
National
Georgian Figure Skating Championships	2nd	1st
