= Figure skating at the 2010 Winter Olympics – Ice dance =

Ice dance at the XXI Olympic Winter Games
- Venue: Pacific Coliseum; Vancouver, Canada
- Dates: 19–22 February 2010
- Competitors: 23 teams from 15 nations
- Winning score: 221.57 points

Medalists
| 1st place, gold medalist(s) | | Tessa Virtue and Scott Moir | Canada |
| 2nd place, silver medalist(s) | | Meryl Davis and Charlie White | United States |
| 3rd place, bronze medalist(s) | | Oksana Domnina and Maxim Shabalin | Russia |

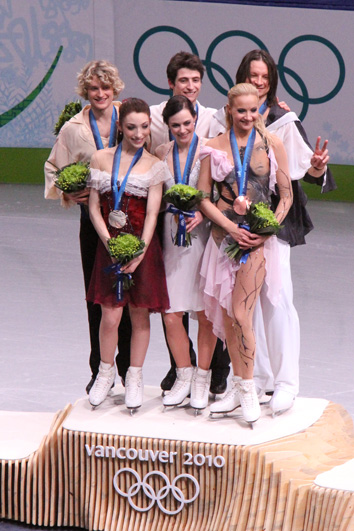
The medalists from the ice dance event at the 2010 Winter Olympics (from left to right): Meryl Davis and Charlie White of the United States (silver), Tessa Virtue and Scott Moir of Canada (gold), and Oksana Domnina and Maxim Shabalin of Russia (bronze)

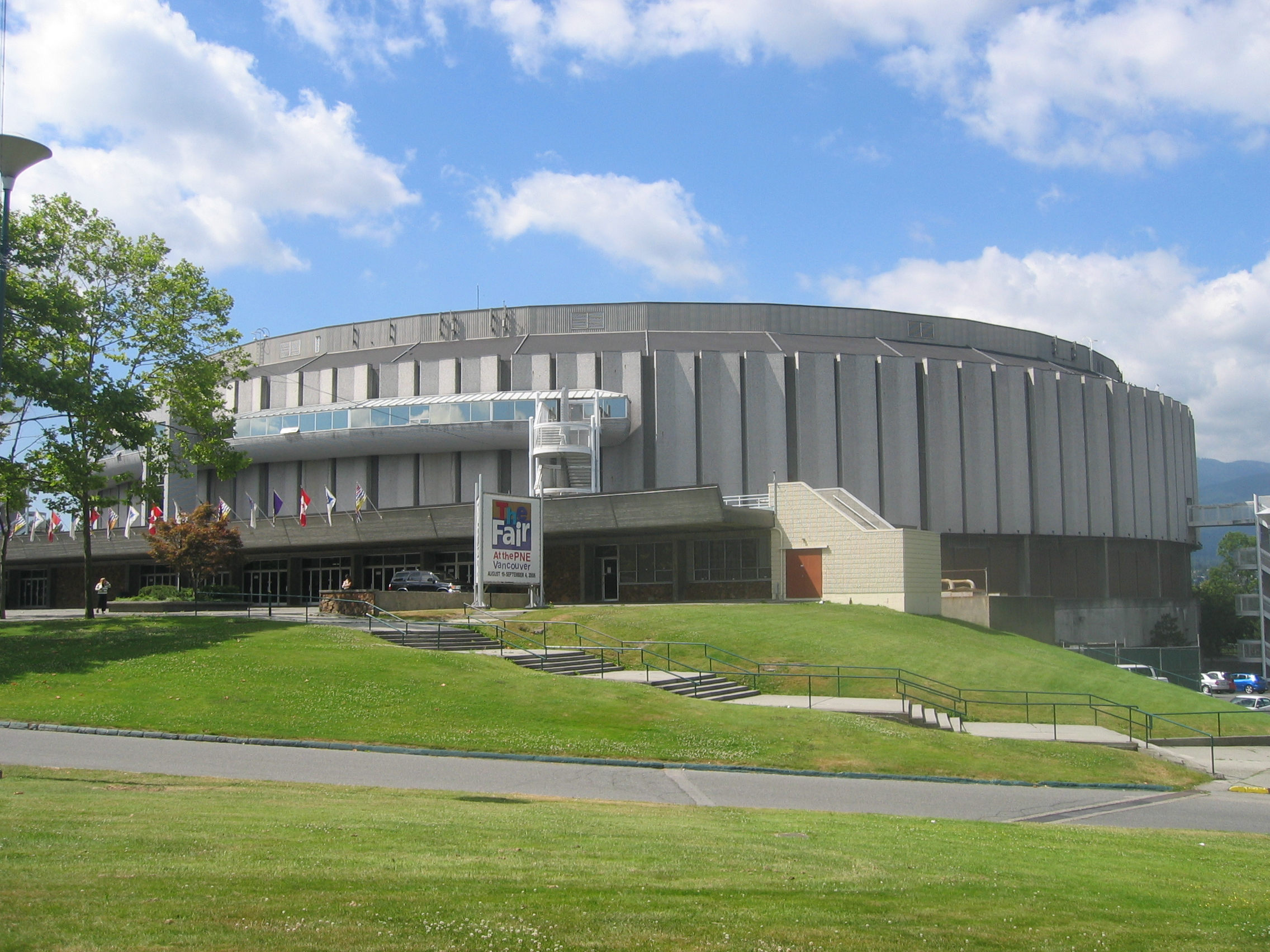
The figure skating events at the 2010 Winter Olympics were held at the Pacific Coliseum in Vancouver, Canada.

The ice dance competition at the 2010 Winter Olympics was held at the Pacific Coliseum in Vancouver, Canada, from 19 to 22 February, and featured 23 teams from 15 different nations. Tessa Virtue and Scott Moir of Canada won the gold medals, while Meryl Davis and Charlie White of the United States won the silver, and Oksana Domnina and Maxim Shabalin of Russia won the bronze. Virtue and Moir became the first team from Canada – and all of North America – to win the Olympic ice dance event. Controversy arose from the decision of Domnina and Shabalin to perform their original dance to what they claimed to be Australian Aboriginal music while wearing costumes which many found offensive.

== Background ==
The ice dance event was one of four figure skating competitions contested at the 2010 Winter Olympics in Vancouver, British Columbia, in Canada. It was held at the Pacific Coliseum over three nights: the compulsory dance took place on 19 February, the original dance on 21 February, and the free dance on 22 February. The competition featured 23 teams representing 15 nations. Since ice dance became an Olympic sport in 1976, only twice had a Soviet or Russian team not won the event: in 1984, when Jayne Torvill and Christopher Dean of Great Britain won after performing their Boléro routine, and in 2002, when the French Federation of Ice Sports was implicated in colluding with the Figure Skating Federation of Russia to award Russia the pairs event and France the ice dance event.

Several teams this season were seen as likely medal contenders. Tessa Virtue and Scott Moir of Canada were two-time world medalists (silver in 2008, bronze in 2009), the 2008 Four Continents champions, and three-time Canadian national champions. Oksana Domnina and Maxim Shabalin of Russia were the 2009 world champions, two-time European champions, and two-time Russian national champions. However, their original dance this season, set to what they claimed was Australian Aboriginal music and featuring garish costumes, provoked controversy. Two teams from the United States were also seen as medal contenders. Tanith Belbin and Benjamin Agosto had won the silver medals at the 2006 Winter Olympics. They were four-time world medalists (silver in 2005 and 2009, bronze in 2006 and 2007), two-time Four Continents champions, and three-time U.S. national champions. However, they finished second to Meryl Davis and Charlie White at the 2010 U.S. Championships. Davis and White, who had trained together with Virtue and Moir in Detroit, were the 2009 Four Continents champions and two-time U.S. national champions.

Isabelle Delobel and Olivier Schoenfelder of France were the 2008 world champions, 2007 European champions, and six-time French national champions. They had finished fourth at the 2006 Winter Olympics; however, Delobel sustained a shoulder injury in late 2008, and shortly thereafter, announced that she was pregnant. She gave birth in October 2009 and returned to training in late October to prepare for the Olympics. Having missed the entire fall competition season, they also skipped the 2010 European Championships, making the 2010 Winter Olympics their first event since 2008.

== Qualification ==
There is no individual athlete qualification to the Olympics; the choice of whom to send is at the discretion of each country's National Olympic Committee (NOC). Nineteen quota spots in the ice dance event were awarded based on the results at the 2009 World Figure Skating Championships. Lithuania had originally qualified one quota spot at the 2009 World Championships; however, they relinquished that spot when Katherine Copely was unable to secure Lithuanian citizenship. The extra quota spot was made available at the 2009 Nebelhorn Trophy along with the other four spots originally allocated.

Qualifying nations in ice dance
| Event | Teams per NOC | Qualifying NOCs | Total teams |
|---|---|---|---|
| 2009 World Championships | 3 | Russia; United States | 18 |
| 2009 World Championships | 2 | Canada; France; Great Britain; Italy | 18 |
| 2009 World Championships | 1 | Germany; Israel; Japan; ~~Lithuania~~; Ukraine | 18 |
| 2009 Nebelhorn Trophy | 1 | China; Czech Republic; Estonia; Georgia; Hungary | 5 |
| Total | | | 23 |

== Required performance elements ==
The ice dance competition at the 2010 Winter Olympics consisted of three segments: the compulsory dance, the original dance, and the free dance. The assigned compulsory dance, the Tango Romantica, was drawn on 4 February 2010. Couples performed the compulsory dance on 19 February, which required them to perform two sequences of the Tango Romantica. All teams performed the same pattern to the same music.

Couples performed their original dances on 21 February. The required rhythm was folk or country. Teams were encouraged, but not required, to use traditional folk or country music and dance styles native to their own nations. Lasting 2 minutes 30 seconds (+/− 10 seconds), the original dance had to include the following elements: one dance lift, one midline step sequence while not touching, one diagonal or circular step sequence while in hold, and one set of sequential twizzles.

Couples performed their free dances on 22 February. Lasting 4 minutes (+/− 10 seconds), the free dance had to include the following elements: three dance lifts, one dance spin, one midline or diagonal step sequence while in hold, one circular or serpentine step sequence while in hold, and one set of synchronized twizzles.

== Judging ==
Teams competing in ice dance were judged according to the required technical elements of their program (such as choreographic elements), as well as the overall presentation of their program, based on a number of program components. Each technical element in an ice dance performance was assigned a predetermined base point value and scored by a panel of nine judges on a scale from –3 to +3 based on the quality of its execution. Each Grade of Execution (GOE) from –3 to +3 was assigned a value as indicated on the Scale of Values. The judging panel's GOE for each element was determined by calculating the trimmed mean (the average after discarding the highest and lowest scores). The panel's scores for all elements were added together to generate a Total Elements Score. At the same time, the judges evaluated each performance based on the program components and assigned each a score from 0.25 to 10 in 0.25-point increments. The judging panel's final score for each program component was also determined by calculating the trimmed mean. Those scores were then multiplied by the factor shown on the chart below; the results were added together to generate a total Program Component Score.

Ice dance program component factoring
| Component | Compulsory dance | Original dance | Free dance |
|---|---|---|---|
| Skating skills | 0.75 | 0.80 | 1.25 |
| Performance | 0.50 | —N/a | |
| Interpretation | 0.50 | —N/a | |
| Timing | 0.75 | —N/a | |
| Transitions/ Footwork | —N/a | 0.80 | 1.75 |
| Performance/ Execution | —N/a | 0.60 | 1.00 |
| Composition/ Choreography | —N/a | 0.60 | 1.00 |
| Musical interpretation/ Timing | —N/a | 1.00 | 1.00 |

Deductions were applied for certain violations, such as time infractions, stops and restarts, or falls. The Total Elements Score and Program Component Score were then added together, minus any deductions, to generate a final performance score for each skater or team.

== Results ==
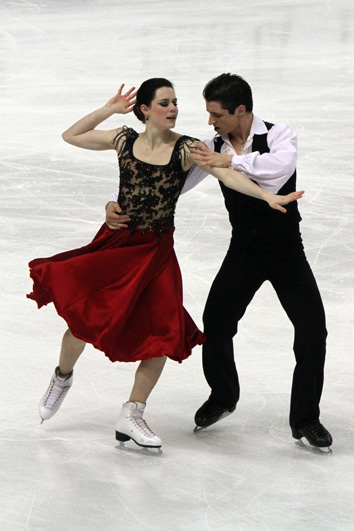
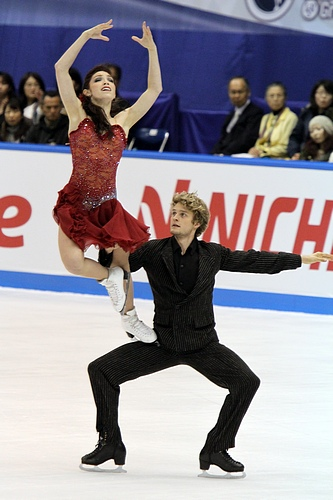
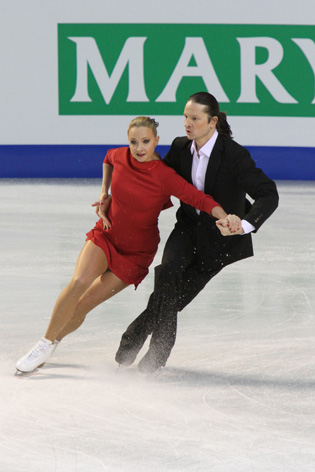
The gold, silver, and bronze medalists from the ice dance event at the 2010 Winter Olympics (from left to right):
Tessa Virtue and Scott Moir of Canada (gold), Meryl Davis and Charlie White of the United States (silver), and Oksana Domnina and Maxim Shabalin of Russia (bronze)

Code key

- TSS – Total Segment Score
- TES – Total Elements Score
- PCS – Program Component Score
- SS – Skating skills
- TI – Timing
- PF – Performance
- IN – Musical interpretation
- MO – Movements/Linking footwork
- CH – Choreography
- IT – Musical interpretation/Timing
- DED – Deductions

=== Compulsory dance ===
The compulsory dance, the Tango Romantica, was held on 19 February. The Tango Romantica was described by Rosie DiManno of the Toronto Star as "a sinuous dance that expresses the soft, lyrical interpretive characteristics of the tango ... and convey[s] a sense of arrogance". All teams performed the same pattern to the same music. Oksana Domnina and Maxim Shabalin of Russia finished in first place and were slightly more than one point ahead of Tessa Virtue and Scott Moir of Canada. A difference of fewer than three points separated the top four couples.

Compulsory dance results
| Pl. | Team | Nation | TSS | TES | PCS | SS | TI | PF | IN |
|---|---|---|---|---|---|---|---|---|---|
| 1 | Oksana Domnina; Maxim Shabalin | Russia | 43.76 | 21.92 | 21.84 | 8.75 | 8.50 | 8.80 | 9.00 |
| 2 | Tessa Virtue; Scott Moir | Canada | 42.74 | 21.40 | 21.34 | 8.55 | 8.40 | 8.60 | 8.65 |
| 3 | Meryl Davis; Charlie White | United States | 41.47 | 20.46 | 21.01 | 8.40 | 8.30 | 8.55 | 8.40 |
| 4 | Tanith Belbin; Benjamin Agosto | United States | 40.83 | 20.16 | 20.67 | 8.25 | 8.20 | 8.25 | 8.40 |
| 5 | Federica Faiella; Massimo Scali | Italy | 39.88 | 19.82 | 20.06 | 8.10 | 7.80 | 8.05 | 8.20 |
| 6 | Isabelle Delobel; Olivier Schoenfelder | France | 37.99 | 18.44 | 19.55 | 7.75 | 7.65 | 7.90 | 8.10 |
| 7 | Jana Khokhlova; Sergei Novitski | Russia | 37.18 | 18.28 | 18.90 | 7.65 | 7.35 | 7.60 | 7.70 |
| 8 | Sinead Kerr; John Kerr | Great Britain | 37.02 | 18.04 | 18.98 | 7.70 | 7.40 | 7.60 | 7.70 |
| 9 | Nathalie Péchalat; Fabian Bourzat | France | 36.13 | 17.72 | 18.41 | 7.40 | 7.10 | 7.45 | 7.60 |
| 10 | Alexandra Zaretsky; Roman Zaretsky | Israel | 34.38 | 17.42 | 16.96 | 6.80 | 6.55 | 6.90 | 7.00 |
| 11 | Anna Zadorozhniuk; Sergei Verbillo | Ukraine | 33.87 | 17.38 | 16.49 | 6.55 | 6.40 | 6.75 | 6.80 |
| 12 | Anna Cappellini; Luca Lanotte | Italy | 33.13 | 16.40 | 16.73 | 6.75 | 6.45 | 6.70 | 6.95 |
| 13 | Nóra Hoffmann; Maxim Zavozin | Hungary | 31.90 | 16.60 | 15.30 | 6.15 | 5.95 | 6.15 | 6.30 |
| 14 | Emily Samuelson; Evan Bates | United States | 31.37 | 16.04 | 15.33 | 6.15 | 6.15 | 6.05 | 6.15 |
| 15 | Vanessa Crone; Paul Poirier | Canada | 31.14 | 16.22 | 14.92 | 6.05 | 5.80 | 6.00 | 6.05 |
| 16 | Christina Beier; William Beier | Germany | 30.31 | 15.82 | 14.49 | 5.90 | 5.50 | 5.90 | 5.95 |
| 17 | Ekaterina Bobrova; Dmitri Soloviev | Russia | 29.86 | 14.50 | 15.36 | 6.15 | 5.85 | 6.25 | 6.45 |
| 18 | Cathy Reed; Chris Reed | Japan | 29.49 | 15.10 | 14.39 | 5.80 | 5.55 | 5.85 | 5.90 |
| 19 | Huang Xintong; Zheng Xun | China | 29.22 | 15.32 | 13.90 | 5.65 | 5.30 | 5.70 | 5.65 |
| 20 | Allison Reed; Otar Japaridze | Georgia | 26.65 | 14.22 | 12.43 | 5.05 | 4.75 | 5.10 | 5.05 |
| 21 | Penny Coomes; Nicholas Buckland | Great Britain | 25.68 | 13.28 | 12.40 | 5.05 | 4.75 | 5.00 | 5.10 |
| 22 | Kamila Hájková; David Vincour | Czech Republic | 23.19 | 12.06 | 11.13 | 4.65 | 4.15 | 4.60 | 4.45 |
| 23 | Irina Štork; Taavi Rand | Estonia | 21.73 | 11.18 | 10.55 | 4.35 | 4.10 | 4.25 | 4.15 |

=== Original dance ===
The original dance was held on 21 February. Tessa Virtue and Scott Moir took the lead, while Meryl Davis and Charlie White of the United States finished in second place, roughly 2.60 points behind Virtue and Moir. Virtue and Moir's flamenco routine was described by Nancy Armour of the Associated Press as "so hot, the ice could have melted beneath their blades", and featured the crisp staccato movements that one would expect from a flamenco, as well as great speed, balance, and strength. Armour described Davis and White's Bollywood-styled routine as a "feast for the senses", featuring complicated steps, interesting movements, speed, and a playful expression. Afterward, Moir expressed his satisfaction that he and Virtue, and Davis and White, had taken the lead: "I'm glad that it's the four of us up at first and second ... That's the way it should be."

Oksana Domnina and Maxim Shabalin finished in third place after performing their Australian Aboriginal-inspired routine that had received much scrutiny before the Olympics had even begun. Christine Brennan, a sports reporter for USA Today, wrote that "as bad as they looked, they skated even worse, with garish, halting moves". Though their routine was described as energetic and entertaining, it lacked the difficulty that Virtue and Moir, and Davis and White, had put into their routines. Armour wrote that it "had no recognizable melody", making the music difficult to follow, relying on heavy drums, didgeridoo riffs, and screams and grunts as vocals.

Original dance results
| Pl. | Team | Nation | TSS | TES | PCS | SS | MO | PF | CH | IT | DED |
|---|---|---|---|---|---|---|---|---|---|---|---|
| 1 | Tessa Virtue; Scott Moir | Canada | 68.41 | 32.90 | 35.51 | 9.30 | 9.10 | 9.50 | 9.40 | 9.45 | 0.00 |
| 2 | Meryl Davis; Charlie White | United States | 67.08 | 32.60 | 34.48 | 8.95 | 8.85 | 9.20 | 9.20 | 9.20 | 0.00 |
| 3 | Oksana Domnina; Maxim Shabalin | Russia | 62.84 | 29.80 | 33.04 | 8.70 | 8.40 | 8.75 | 8.85 | 8.80 | 0.00 |
| 4 | Tanith Belbin; Benjamin Agosto | United States | 62.50 | 30.10 | 32.40 | 8.50 | 8.20 | 8.70 | 8.45 | 8.75 | 0.00 |
| 5 | Federica Faiella; Massimo Scali | Italy | 60.18 | 28.60 | 31.58 | 8.30 | 8.05 | 8.40 | 8.35 | 8.45 | 0.00 |
| 6 | Nathalie Péchalat; Fabian Bourzat | France | 59.99 | 29.90 | 30.09 | 7.80 | 7.70 | 7.90 | 8.00 | 8.15 | 0.00 |
| 7 | Isabelle Delobel; Olivier Schoenfelder | France | 58.68 | 27.40 | 32.28 | 8.40 | 8.20 | 8.65 | 8.60 | 8.65 | 1.00 |
| 8 | Sinead Kerr; John Kerr | Great Britain | 56.76 | 27.30 | 29.46 | 7.65 | 7.40 | 7.85 | 7.85 | 8.00 | 0.00 |
| 9 | Jana Khokhlova; Sergei Novitski | Russia | 55.57 | 26.10 | 29.47 | 7.80 | 7.50 | 7.90 | 7.90 | 7.75 | 0.00 |
| 10 | Alexandra Zaretsky; Roman Zaretsky | Israel | 55.24 | 27.30 | 27.94 | 7.25 | 7.10 | 7.40 | 7.45 | 7.55 | 0.00 |
| 11 | Emily Samuelson; Evan Bates | United States | 53.99 | 28.60 | 25.39 | 6.75 | 6.50 | 6.80 | 6.60 | 6.75 | 0.00 |
| 12 | Anna Cappellini; Luca Lanotte | Italy | 51.45 | 26.50 | 24.95 | 6.60 | 6.35 | 6.75 | 6.65 | 6.55 | 0.00 |
| 13 | Nóra Hoffmann; Maxim Zavozin | Hungary | 51.22 | 25.70 | 25.52 | 6.65 | 6.50 | 6.65 | 6.85 | 6.90 | 0.00 |
| 14 | Cathy Reed; Chris Reed | Japan | 50.81 | 27.70 | 23.11 | 6.00 | 5.65 | 6.30 | 6.10 | 6.35 | 0.00 |
| 15 | Ekaterina Bobrova; Dmitri Soloviev | Russia | 50.61 | 25.60 | 25.01 | 6.50 | 6.35 | 6.65 | 6.65 | 6.75 | 0.00 |
| 16 | Anna Zadorozhniuk; Sergei Verbillo | Ukraine | 50.02 | 24.30 | 25.72 | 6.75 | 6.60 | 6.90 | 6.75 | 6.85 | 0.00 |
| 17 | Vanessa Crone; Paul Poirier | Canada | 48.17 | 24.00 | 24.17 | 6.45 | 6.10 | 6.45 | 6.60 | 6.30 | 0.00 |
| 18 | Christina Beier; William Beier | Germany | 46.42 | 25.00 | 21.42 | 5.80 | 5.45 | 5.75 | 5.70 | 5.55 | 0.00 |
| 19 | Penny Coomes; Nicholas Buckland | Great Britain | 46.33 | 24.60 | 21.73 | 5.60 | 5.40 | 5.90 | 5.90 | 5.85 | 0.00 |
| 20 | Huang Xintong; Zheng Xun | China | 45.03 | 22.70 | 22.33 | 5.95 | 5.60 | 6.00 | 5.90 | 5.95 | 0.00 |
| 21 | Allison Reed; Otar Japaridze | Georgia | 42.22 | 22.50 | 19.72 | 5.25 | 4.90 | 5.25 | 5.50 | 5.15 | 0.00 |
| 22 | Kamila Hájková; David Vincour | Czech Republic | 40.54 | 22.10 | 18.44 | 5.00 | 4.65 | 4.90 | 5.05 | 4.75 | 0.00 |
| 23 | Irina Štork; Taavi Rand | Estonia | 35.21 | 19.90 | 16.31 | 4.35 | 4.05 | 4.20 | 4.70 | 4.25 | 1.00 |

=== Free dance ===
The free dance was held on 22 February. Tessa Virtue and Scott Moir became the first ice dancers from Canada – and all of North America – to win the Olympic gold medals in ice dance. Their free dance was described by Nancy Armour as tender and sensual, starting slow while highlighting their skating skills and deep edges that gave them the illusion of floating above the ice, while building power and speed, and performing exquisite spins and lifts.

Meryl Davis and Charlie White won the silver medals. Armour wrote that Davis and White's routine, set to music from The Phantom of the Opera, was as "big and bold... as any Broadway production", featuring lifts performed with tremendous speed and control, while also conveying lyricism and romance. Davis and White's silver was the 25th medal won by the United States at the 2010 Winter Olympics.

Oksana Domnina and Maxim Shabalin finished in third place; their routine was described by Barry Wilner of the Associated Press as highly entertaining and theatrical, but lacking in the skating skills, power, and innovation that the gold and silver medalists demonstrated. Tanith Belbin and Benjamin Agosto of the United States, who had won the silver at the 2006 Winter Olympics, finished fourth.

Free dance results
| Pl. | Team | Nation | TSS | TES | PCS | SS | MO | PF | CH | IT | DED |
|---|---|---|---|---|---|---|---|---|---|---|---|
| 1 | Tessa Virtue; Scott Moir | Canada | 110.42 | 53.10 | 57.32 | 9.50 | 9.45 | 9.60 | 9.60 | 9.70 | 0.00 |
| 2 | Meryl Davis; Charlie White | United States | 107.19 | 52.80 | 55.39 | 9.15 | 9.00 | 9.45 | 9.30 | 9.45 | 1.00 |
| 3 | Oksana Domnina; Maxim Shabalin | Russia | 101.04 | 48.00 | 53.04 | 8.85 | 8.70 | 8.95 | 8.90 | 8.90 | 0.00 |
| 4 | Tanith Belbin; Benjamin Agosto | United States | 99.74 | 48.00 | 51.74 | 8.75 | 8.40 | 8.70 | 8.55 | 8.85 | 0.00 |
| 5 | Federica Faiella; Massimo Scali | Italy | 99.11 | 47.70 | 51.41 | 8.50 | 8.30 | 8.80 | 8.70 | 8.75 | 0.00 |
| 6 | Isabelle Delobel; Olivier Schoenfelder | France | 97.06 | 46.00 | 51.06 | 8.50 | 8.30 | 8.65 | 8.55 | 8.70 | 0.00 |
| 7 | Nathalie Péchalat; Fabian Bourzat | France | 94.37 | 46.90 | 47.47 | 7.95 | 7.70 | 7.90 | 8.05 | 8.10 | 0.00 |
| 8 | Jana Khokhlova; Sergei Novitski | Russia | 93.11 | 45.50 | 47.61 | 8.00 | 7.75 | 8.00 | 8.00 | 8.05 | 0.00 |
| 9 | Sinead Kerr; John Kerr | Great Britain | 92.23 | 44.30 | 47.93 | 7.90 | 7.80 | 8.10 | 8.15 | 8.15 | 0.00 |
| 10 | Alexandra Zaretsky; Roman Zaretsky | Israel | 90.64 | 45.20 | 45.44 | 7.55 | 7.40 | 7.80 | 7.55 | 7.70 | 0.00 |
| 11 | Emily Samuelson; Evan Bates | United States | 88.94 | 46.40 | 42.54 | 7.10 | 6.95 | 7.30 | 6.95 | 7.25 | 0.00 |
| 12 | Vanessa Crone; Paul Poirier | Canada | 85.29 | 45.40 | 39.89 | 6.75 | 6.40 | 6.80 | 6.70 | 6.75 | 0.00 |
| 13 | Nóra Hoffmann; Maxim Zavozin | Hungary | 84.11 | 43.40 | 40.71 | 6.85 | 6.60 | 6.95 | 6.60 | 7.05 | 0.00 |
| 14 | Ekaterina Bobrova; Dmitri Soloviev | Russia | 82.88 | 42.30 | 41.58 | 7.00 | 6.70 | 7.05 | 7.00 | 7.05 | 1.00 |
| 15 | Anna Cappellini; Luca Lanotte | Italy | 82.74 | 44.60 | 39.14 | 6.65 | 6.30 | 6.60 | 6.60 | 6.60 | 1.00 |
| 16 | Cathy Reed; Chris Reed | Japan | 79.30 | 42.50 | 36.80 | 6.25 | 5.85 | 6.55 | 6.10 | 6.10 | 0.00 |
| 17 | Anna Zadorozhniuk; Sergei Verbillo | Ukraine | 79.26 | 39.20 | 40.06 | 6.80 | 6.55 | 6.70 | 6.75 | 6.65 | 0.00 |
| 18 | Christina Beier; William Beier | Germany | 72.91 | 38.90 | 34.01 | 5.90 | 5.50 | 5.75 | 5.65 | 5.60 | 0.00 |
| 19 | Penny Coomes; Nicholas Buckland | Great Britain | 71.60 | 41.30 | 31.30 | 5.25 | 5.05 | 5.35 | 5.25 | 5.30 | 1.00 |
| 20 | Huang Xintong; Zheng Xun | China | 71.27 | 37.70 | 33.57 | 5.90 | 5.45 | 5.65 | 5.50 | 5.50 | 0.00 |
| 21 | Kamila Hájková; David Vincour | Czech Republic | 70.08 | 41.30 | 28.78 | 5.00 | 4.50 | 4.90 | 4.95 | 4.80 | 0.00 |
| 22 | Allison Reed; Otar Japaridze | Georgia | 63.45 | 36.30 | 28.15 | 4.85 | 4.45 | 4.80 | 4.75 | 4.75 | 1.00 |
| 23 | Irina Štork; Taavi Rand | Estonia | 58.24 | 35.10 | 24.14 | 4.20 | 3.85 | 4.05 | 4.10 | 4.00 | 1.00 |

=== Overall ===
Ice dance results
| Rank | Team | Nation | Total | CD | | OD | | FD | |
|---|---|---|---|---|---|---|---|---|---|
| 1st place, gold medalist(s) | Tessa Virtue; Scott Moir | Canada | 221.57 | 2 | 42.74 | 1 | 68.41 | 1 | 110.42 |
| 2nd place, silver medalist(s) | Meryl Davis; Charlie White | United States | 215.74 | 3 | 41.47 | 2 | 67.08 | 2 | 107.19 |
| 3rd place, bronze medalist(s) | Oksana Domnina; Maxim Shabalin | Russia | 207.64 | 1 | 43.76 | 3 | 62.84 | 3 | 101.04 |
| 4 | Tanith Belbin; Benjamin Agosto | United States | 203.07 | 4 | 40.83 | 4 | 62.50 | 4 | 99.74 |
| 5 | Federica Faiella; Massimo Scali | Italy | 199.17 | 5 | 39.88 | 5 | 60.18 | 5 | 99.11 |
| 6 | Isabelle Delobel; Olivier Schoenfelder | France | 193.73 | 6 | 37.99 | 7 | 58.68 | 6 | 97.06 |
| 7 | Nathalie Péchalat; Fabian Bourzat | France | 190.49 | 9 | 36.13 | 6 | 59.99 | 7 | 94.37 |
| 8 | Sinead Kerr; John Kerr | Great Britain | 186.01 | 8 | 37.02 | 8 | 56.76 | 9 | 92.23 |
| 9 | Jana Khokhlova; Sergei Novitski | Russia | 185.86 | 7 | 37.18 | 9 | 55.57 | 8 | 93.11 |
| 10 | Alexandra Zaretsky; Roman Zaretsky | Israel | 180.26 | 10 | 34.38 | 10 | 55.24 | 10 | 90.64 |
| 11 | Emily Samuelson; Evan Bates | United States | 174.30 | 14 | 31.37 | 11 | 53.99 | 11 | 88.94 |
| 12 | Anna Cappellini; Luca Lanotte | Italy | 167.32 | 12 | 33.13 | 12 | 51.45 | 15 | 82.74 |
| 13 | Nóra Hoffmann; Maxim Zavozin | Hungary | 167.23 | 13 | 31.90 | 13 | 51.22 | 13 | 84.11 |
| 14 | Vanessa Crone; Paul Poirier | Canada | 164.60 | 15 | 31.14 | 17 | 48.17 | 12 | 85.29 |
| 15 | Ekaterina Bobrova; Dmitri Soloviev | Russia | 163.35 | 17 | 29.86 | 15 | 50.61 | 14 | 82.88 |
| 16 | Anna Zadorozhniuk; Sergei Verbillo | Ukraine | 163.15 | 11 | 33.87 | 16 | 50.02 | 17 | 79.26 |
| 17 | Cathy Reed; Chris Reed | Japan | 159.60 | 18 | 29.49 | 14 | 50.81 | 16 | 79.30 |
| 18 | Christina Beier; William Beier | Germany | 149.64 | 16 | 30.31 | 18 | 46.42 | 18 | 72.91 |
| 19 | Huang Xintong; Zheng Xun | China | 145.52 | 19 | 29.22 | 20 | 45.03 | 20 | 71.27 |
| 20 | Penny Coomes; Nicholas Buckland | Great Britain | 143.61 | 21 | 25.68 | 19 | 46.33 | 19 | 71.60 |
| 21 | Kamila Hájková; David Vincour | Czech Republic | 133.81 | 22 | 23.19 | 22 | 40.54 | 21 | 70.08 |
| 22 | Allison Reed; Otar Japaridze | Georgia | 132.32 | 20 | 26.65 | 21 | 42.22 | 22 | 63.45 |
| 23 | Irina Štork; Taavi Rand | Estonia | 115.18 | 23 | 21.73 | 23 | 35.21 | 23 | 58.24 |

== Reactions to Russian team's original dance ==
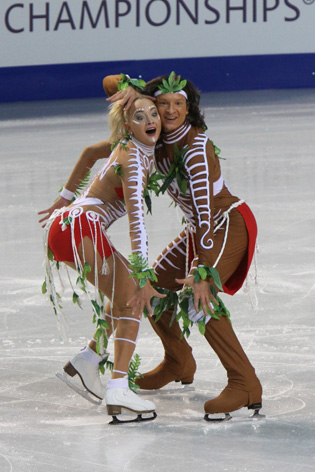
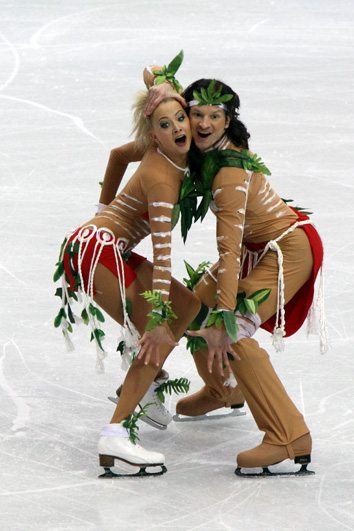
Oksana Domnina and Maxim Shabalin of Russia provoked controversy with their choice of Australian Aboriginal music and costume design for their original dance. On the left are Domnina and Shabalin as they appeared at the 2010 European Figure Skating Championships, and on the right, as they appeared at the 2010 Winter Olympics.

Oksana Domnina and Maxim Shabalin of Russia provoked controversy with their original dance – set to what they described as Australian Aboriginal music – and their costume design, which many found garish. Domnina and Shabalin debuted their routine at the 2010 Russian Figure Skating Championships, and then performed it again at the 2010 European Championships; they ended up winning both events. The theme of the original dance was folk or country, and while it was recommended that couples use traditional folk or country music and dance styles native to their own nations, it was not a requirement. Domnina and Shabalin's music featured heavy drums, a didgeridoo, and vocal chanting, while their costumes consisted of dark flesh-toned bodysuits with red loincloths, decorated with white markings and faux green leaves, as well as face paint.

Bev Manton, chairwoman of the New South Wales Aboriginal Land Council, wrote that Domnina and Shabalin's costumes were "no more authentic or Aboriginal than the shiploads of cheap Aboriginal tourist trinkets that pour into [Australia] from overseas". Manton found their depiction of Aboriginal and Torres Strait Islander culture offensive, citing the brown bodysuits as problematic and likening their appearance to blackface. She added further: "They are not, as they state, wearing 'authentic Aboriginal paint markings'. They are wearing white body paint in designs they dreamed up after reading about Aboriginal Australians on the internet." Just as the designs were not from the Australian First Nations community, neither was the music, as she explained, since it was composed by Sheila Chandra, a Briton of Indian descent. Sol Bellear, the New South Wales representative on the Aboriginal Land Council, said the routine was "yet another example of the Aboriginal people of Australia being exploited" and "straight-out cultural theft". Additionally, members of the First Nations community in British Columbia were upset with the way Indigenous culture was being represented on a global platform, with former First Nations chief of the Neskonlith Indian Band Arthur Manuel stating, "People make fun of us and it is painful; that is something [Domnina and Shabalin] should have been very cognizant of."

Belinda Noonan, four-time Australian national champion in pair skating and Australian figure skating commentator, was critical of Domnina and Shabalin's routine, calling the costumes "dreadful" and criticizing their lack of research. She also criticized the musical arrangement, noting the use of Chandra's music versus that of an Aboriginal and Torres Strait Islander artist with "some didgeridoo [put] in a couple of places". Noonan stated that she had contacted Domnina and Shabalin's team for more information about their program, but had not received a response.

When Domnina and Shabalin were questioned about their program during the European Championships, Domnina said that they were unaware of any controversy concerning their program. Shabalin said that he had done research on the internet for their routine, but claimed that their dance was "not specifically an Australian Aboriginal dance", but "an aboriginal dance", and that they had created the routine because they "wanted to be different". The Figure Skating Federation of Russia expressed shock at the criticism, stating that all teams had to perform a "world" dance, pointing to the Argentine tango and Viennese waltz as examples of routines performed without controversy. Oleg Ovsyannikov, 1998 Winter Olympic silver medalist in ice dance, defended Domnina and Shabalin's intentions, saying that they were "not trying to hurt anyone's feelings", and also remarked that "these kinds of dances are really rather typical [in ice dance]".

Upon hearing that Domnina and Shabalin intended to perform the same routine at the 2010 Winter Olympics, representatives of the Four Host First Nations – the Lilʼwat, the Musqueam, the Squamish, and the Tsleil-Waututh – offered to meet with them. These First Nations, in whose traditional land the 2010 Winter Olympics were being held, were recognized as partners in the planning of the Olympics by the Vancouver Organizing Committee. They recommended that Domnina and Shabalin contact Aboriginal and Torres Strait Islander communities in Australia for feedback before coming to the Olympics. Danielle O'Brien and Gregory Merriman, an Australian ice dance team, had also performed their original dance that season to Aboriginal and Torres Strait Islander music, but they had sought the input of an elder so they could ensure that the dance was done accurately and respectfully. Victor Kraatz, the 2003 world champion and ten-time Canadian national champion in ice dance, had worked with O'Brien and Merriman, and explained that Aboriginal and Torres Strait Islander women did not wear body paint, nor did they wear red except for ceremonial purposes. Ultimately, Domnina and Shabalin's costumes were slightly modified for the Olympics. Shabalin's bodysuit was a lighter color tan, and neither he nor Domnina wore any face paint.

== Works cited ==
- "Special Regulations & Technical Rules – Single & Pair Skating and Ice Dance 2008" (PDF). International Skating Union. Archived (PDF) from the original on 16 October 2021.
