= Figure skating at the 2022 Winter Olympics =

Figure skating at the XXIV Olympic Winter Games
- Venue: Capital Indoor Stadium; Beijing, China
- Dates: 4–20 February 2022
- No. of events: 5
- Competitors: 148 (74 men, 74 women) from 32 nations

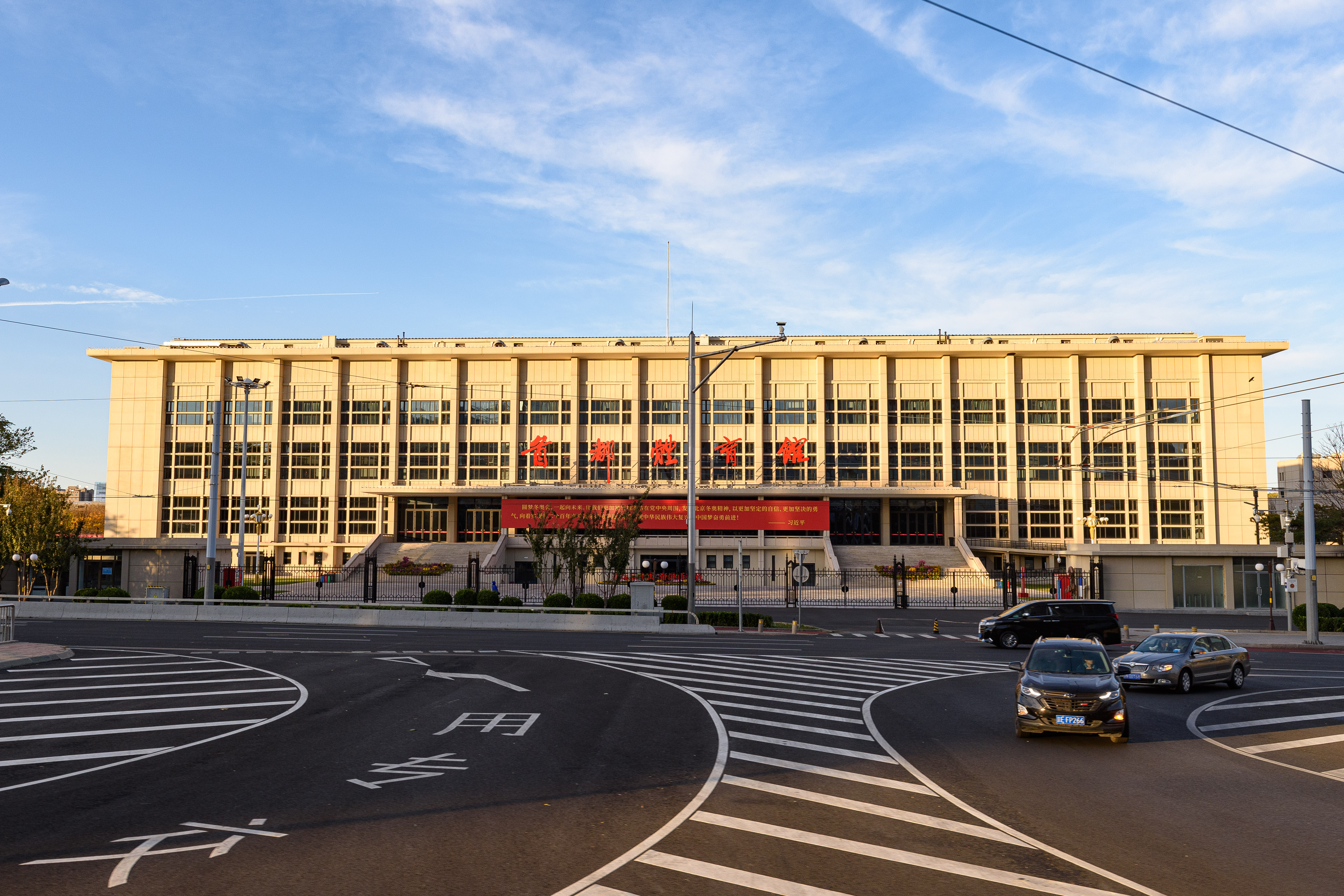
The figure skating events at the 2022 Winter Olympics were held at the Capital Indoor Stadium in Beijing, China.

The figure skating events at the 2022 Winter Olympics took place from 4 to 20 February at the Capital Indoor Stadium in Beijing, China, and featured 148 skaters from 32 nations. Medals were awarded in men's singles, women's singles, pair skating, ice dance, and the team event. Nathan Chen of the United States won the men's event; Anna Shcherbakova, representing the Russian Olympic Committee, won the women's event; Sui Wenjing and Han Cong of China won the pairs event, and Gabriella Papadakis and Guillaume Cizeron of France won the ice dance event.

The figure skating events were overshadowed by scandal when it was announced that a positive test confirming the presence of a banned substance was received from a sample submitted by Kamila Valieva of Russia. The Court of Arbitration for Sport ruled that Valieva be allowed to compete in the individual women's event while the investigation was ongoing. The team representing the Russian Olympic Committee originally finished first in the team event; however, the medal ceremony was postponed after Valieva's test results were announced. After nearly two years of litigation, Valieva's scores were annulled, and the team from the United States was awarded the gold medals.

== Background ==
In 2016, an independent report commissioned by the World Anti-Doping Agency (WADA) confirmed allegations that the Russian Olympic team had been involved in a state-sponsored doping program from at least late 2011 through February 2014, when Russia hosted the Winter Olympics in Sochi. On 9 December 2019, the WADA banned Russia from all international competitions after it found that data provided by the Russian Anti-Doping Agency had been manipulated by Russian authorities in order to protect athletes involved in its doping scheme. Under a ruling by the Court of Arbitration for Sport in December 2020, Russian athletes could not use the Russian flag or anthem in international competition and had to compete as "Neutral Athletes" or a "Neutral Team" at any world championships for the next two years. On 19 February 2021, it was announced that Russian athletes would compete under the name of the Russian Olympic Committee (ROC) at the 2020 Summer Olympics and 2022 Winter Olympics.

A total of five figure skating events were contested: men's singles, women's singles, pair skating, ice dance, and the team event. All events were held from 4 to 20 February at the Capital Indoor Stadium in Beijing, China. Beginning with the 2021–22 season, the International Skating Union (ISU) changed the name of the women's event from "ladies' singles" to "women's singles".

== Qualification ==
A total of 144 quota spots were available to athletes to compete in figure skating at the 2022 Winter Olympics. Each National Olympic Committee (NOC) was allowed to enter a maximum of 18 skaters, with a maximum of nine men or nine women. The results of the 2021 World Figure Skating Championships determined 83 total spots: 24 entries each in men's and women's singles, 16 in pair skating, and 19 in ice dance. The remaining quota spots were allocated based on the results of the 2021 Nebelhorn Trophy. Ten nations were cleared to compete in the team event, although three nations had to use "Additional Athlete Quotas" to complete their teams. These additional athletes were eligible to compete in the team event but not in the individual Olympic figure skating events.

Number of qualified skaters or teams per nation
Nations	Men's singles	Women's singles	Pairs	Ice dance	Team event	Add.	Skater(s)
Armenia				1			2
Australia	1	1					2
Austria		1	1				3
Azerbaijan	1	1					2
Belarus	1	1					2
Belgium		1					1
Bulgaria		1					1
Canada	2	1	2	3	Yes		13
China	1	1	2	1	Yes		8
Czech Republic	1	1	1	1	Yes		6
Estonia	1	1					2
Finland		1		1			3
France	2			1			4
Georgia	1	1	1	1	Yes		6
Germany		1	1	1	Yes	1 (Note: Paul Fentz of Germany competed in the team event, but not the men's individual event.)	6
Great Britain		1		1			3
Hungary			1				2
Israel	1		1				3
Italy	2		2	1	Yes	1 (Note: Lara Naki Gutmann of Italy competed in the team event, but not the women's individual event.)	9
Japan	3	3	1	1	Yes		10
Latvia	1						1
Lithuania				1			2
Mexico	1						1
Netherlands		1					1
Poland		1		1			3
ROC	3	3	3	3	Yes		18
South Korea	2	2					4
Spain			1	1			4
Sweden	1	1					2
Switzerland	1	1					2
Ukraine	1	1		1	Yes	2 (Note: Sofiia Holichenko and Artem Darenskyi of Ukraine competed in the team event, but not the pairs event.)	6
United States	3	3	2	3	Yes		16
Total: 32 NOCs	30	30	19 teams	23 teams	10 teams	4	148

=== Team event ===
For the team event, scores from the 2021 World Championships and the 2021–22 Grand Prix Series were tabulated to establish the top ten nations.

Qualification for figure skating team event
Pl.	Nation	M	W	P	D	Total
1	ROC	Yes	Yes	Yes	Yes	5947
2	United States	Yes	Yes	Yes	Yes	5209
3	Canada	Yes	Yes	Yes	Yes	3949
4	Japan	Yes	Yes	Yes	Yes	3830
5	China	Yes	Yes	Yes	Yes	2809
6	Italy	Yes	(Note: Although Italy did not qualify a women's singles skater for the team event, they were able to use an "Additional Athlete Quota" to complete their team.)	Yes	Yes	2774
7	Germany	(Note: Although Germany did not qualify a men's singles skater for the team event, they were able to use an "Additional Athlete Quota" to complete their team.)	Yes	Yes	Yes	1480
8	Georgia	Yes	Yes	Yes	Yes	1472
9	Czech Republic	Yes	Yes	Yes	Yes	1137
10	Ukraine	Yes	Yes	(Note: Although Ukraine did not qualify a pair skating team for the team event, they were able to use an "Additional Athlete Quota" to complete their team.)	Yes	893

== Entries ==
Countries began announcing their selections following the 2021 World Championships. The International Skating Union published a complete list of entries on 26 January 2022. Skaters or teams denoted with ● were eligible for the team event only.

Entries
Nation	Men	Women	Pairs	Ice dance	Ref.
Armenia	—N/a			Tina Garabedian; Simon Proulx-Sénécal	
Australia	Brendan Kerry	Kailani Craine	—N/a		
Austria	—N/a	Olga Mikutina	Miriam Ziegler; Severin Kiefer	—N/a	
Azerbaijan	Vladimir Litvintsev	Ekaterina Ryabova	—N/a		
Belarus	Konstantin Milyukov	Viktoriia Safonova	—N/a		
Belgium	—N/a	Loena Hendrickx	—N/a		
Bulgaria	—N/a	Alexandra Feigin	—N/a		
Canada	Keegan Messing	Madeline Schizas	Vanessa James; Eric Radford	Laurence Fournier Beaudry; Nikolaj Sørensen	
Canada	Roman Sadovsky	—N/a	Kirsten Moore-Towers; Michael Marinaro	Piper Gilles; Paul Poirier	
Canada	—N/a	—N/a	—N/a	Marjorie Lajoie; Zachary Lagha	
China	Jin Boyang	Zhu Yi	Peng Cheng; Jin Yang	Wang Shiyue; Liu Xinyu	
China	—N/a		Sui Wenjing; Han Cong	—N/a	
Czech Republic	Michal Březina	Eliška Březinová	Jelizaveta Žuková; Martin Bidař	Natálie Taschlerová; Filip Taschler	
Estonia	Aleksandr Selevko	Eva-Lotta Kiibus	—N/a		
Finland	—N/a	Jenni Saarinen	—N/a	Juulia Turkkila; Matthias Versluis	
France	Kévin Aymoz	—N/a		Gabriella Papadakis; Guillaume Cizeron	
France	Adam Siao Him Fa	—N/a		—N/a	
Georgia	Morisi Kvitelashvili	Anastasiia Gubanova	Karina Safina; Luka Berulava	Maria Kazakova; Georgy Reviya	
Germany	Paul Fentz ●	Nicole Schott	Minerva Fabienne Hase; Nolan Seegert	Katharina Müller; Tim Dieck	
Great Britain	—N/a	Natasha McKay	—N/a	Lilah Fear; Lewis Gibson	
Hungary	—N/a		Ioulia Chtchetinina; Márk Magyar	—N/a	
Israel	Alexei Bychenko	—N/a	Hailey Kops; Evgeni Krasnopolski	—N/a	
Italy	Daniel Grassl	Lara Naki Gutmann ●	Nicole Della Monica; Matteo Guarise	Charlène Guignard; Marco Fabbri	
Italy	Matteo Rizzo	—N/a	Rebecca Ghilardi; Filippo Ambrosini	—N/a	
Japan	Yuzuru Hanyu	Wakaba Higuchi	Riku Miura; Ryuichi Kihara	Misato Komatsubara; Tim Koleto	
Japan	Yuma Kagiyama	Mana Kawabe	—N/a		
Japan	Shoma Uno	Kaori Sakamoto	—N/a		
Latvia	Deniss Vasiļjevs	—N/a			
Lithuania	—N/a			Paulina Ramanauskaitė; Deividas Kizala	
Mexico	Donovan Carrillo	—N/a			
Netherlands	—N/a	Lindsay van Zundert	—N/a		
Poland	—N/a	Ekaterina Kurakova	—N/a	Natalia Kaliszek; Maksym Spodyriev	
ROC	Mark Kondratiuk	Anna Shcherbakova	Aleksandra Boikova; Dmitrii Kozlovskii	Diana Davis; Gleb Smolkin	
ROC	Andrei Mozalev	Alexandra Trusova	Anastasia Mishina; Aleksandr Galliamov	Victoria Sinitsina; Nikita Katsalapov	
ROC	Evgeni Semenenko	~~Kamila Valieva~~ (Note: On 29 January 2024, the Court of Arbitration for Sport disqualified Kamila Valieva for four years retroactive to 25 December 2021 for an anti-doping rule violation. Valieva's results from the 2022 Winter Olympics were ultimately vacated.)	Evgenia Tarasova; Vladimir Morozov	Alexandra Stepanova; Ivan Bukin	
South Korea	Cha Jun-hwan	Kim Ye-lim	—N/a		
South Korea	Lee Si-hyeong	You Young	—N/a		
Spain	—N/a		Laura Barquero; Marco Zandron	Olivia Smart; Adrián Díaz	
Sweden	Nikolaj Majorov	Josefin Taljegård	—N/a		
Switzerland	Lukas Britschgi	Alexia Paganini	—N/a		
Ukraine	Ivan Shmuratko	Anastasiia Shabotova	Sofiia Holichenko; Artem Darenskyi; ●	Oleksandra Nazarova; Maksym Nikitin	
United States	Jason Brown	Mariah Bell	Ashley Cain-Gribble; Timothy LeDuc	Madison Chock; Evan Bates	
United States	Nathan Chen	Karen Chen	Alexa Knierim; Brandon Frazier	Kaitlin Hawayek; Jean-Luc Baker	
United States	Vincent Zhou	Alysa Liu	—N/a	Madison Hubbell; Zachary Donohue	

== Competition schedule ==
Figure skating events schedule
Date	Time	Event
4 February	9:55	Team event (men's short program)
4 February	11:35	Team event (ice dance rhythm dance)
4 February	13:15	Team event (pairs' short program)
6 February	9:30	Team event (women's short program)
6 February	11:50	Team event (men's free skating)
7 February	9:15	Team event (pairs' free skating)
7 February	10:30	Team event (ice dance free dance)
7 February	11:35	Team event (women's free skating)
8 February	9:15	Men's short program
10 February	9:30	Men's free skating
12 February	19:00	Ice dance rhythm dance
14 February	9:15	Ice dance free dance
15 February	18:00	Women's short program
17 February	18:00	Women's free skating
18 February	18:30	Pairs' short program
19 February	19:00	Pairs' free skating
20 February	12:00	Exhibition gala

== Medal summary ==
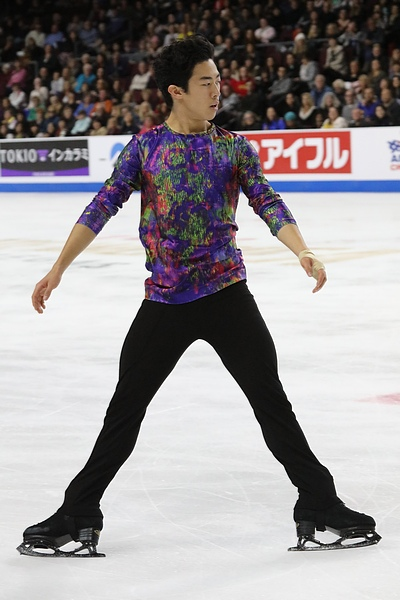
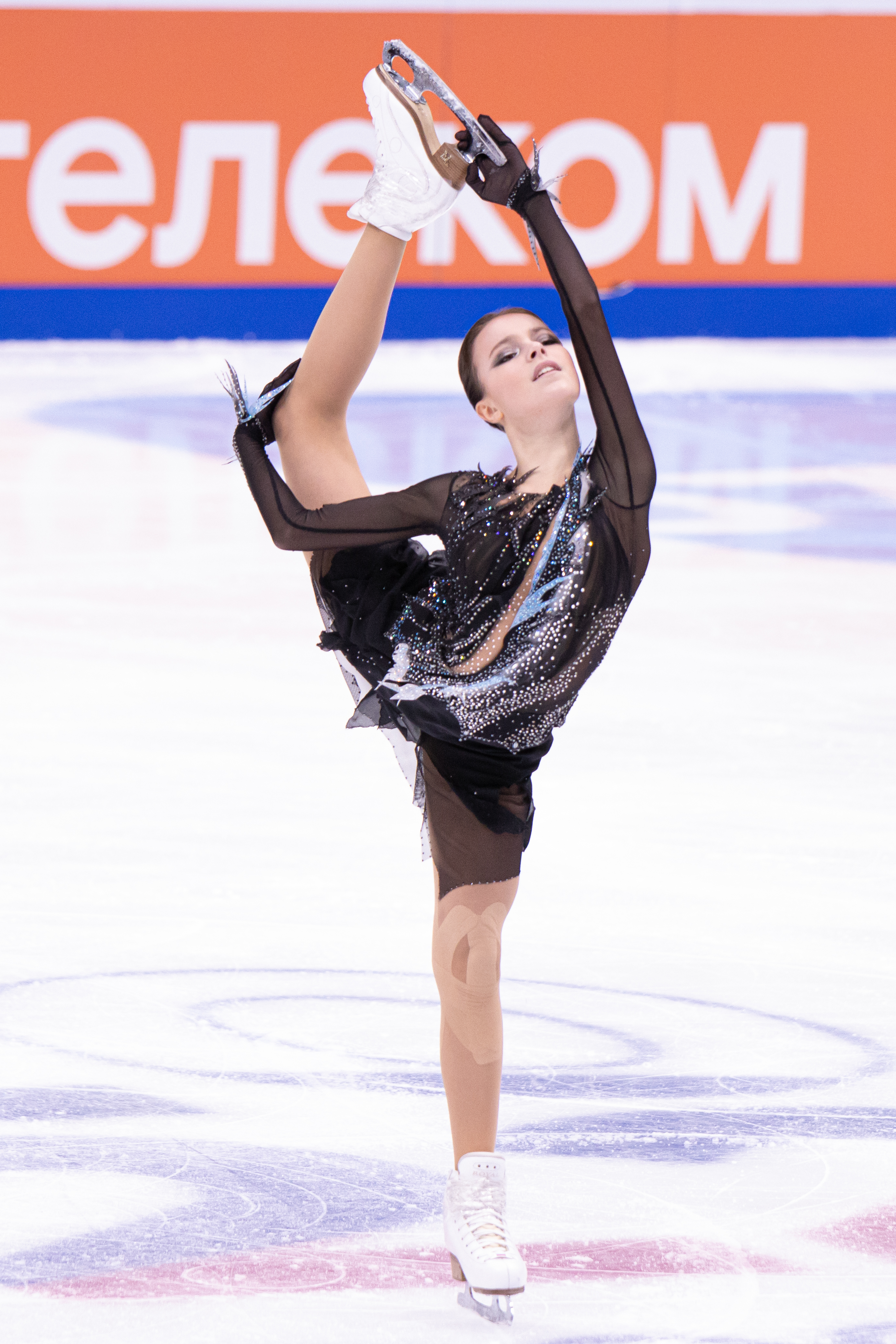
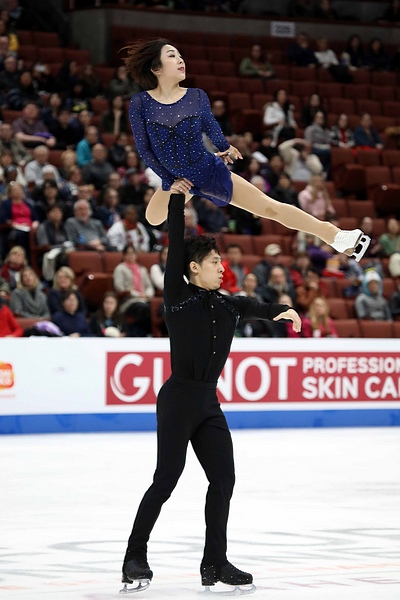
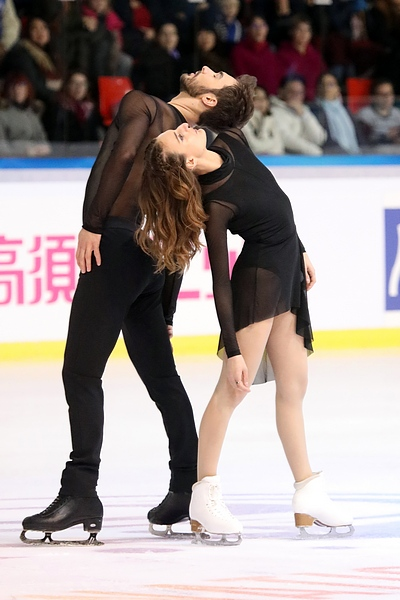
The 2022 Olympic figure skating champions (from left to right):
Nathan Chen of the United States (men's singles), Anna Shcherbakova of Russia (women's singles), Sui Wenjing and Han Cong of China (pair skating), and Gabriella Papadakis and Guillaume Cizeron of France (ice dance)

=== Medalists ===
Olympic medalists
Discipline	Gold	Silver	Bronze	Ref.
Men's singles	Nathan Chen; United States	Yuma Kagiyama; Japan	Shoma Uno; Japan	
Women's singles	Anna Shcherbakova; ROC	Alexandra Trusova; ROC	Kaori Sakamoto; Japan	
Pairs	Sui Wenjing; Han Cong; China	Evgenia Tarasova; Vladimir Morozov; ROC	Anastasia Mishina; Aleksandr Galliamov; ROC	
Ice dance	Gabriella Papadakis; Guillaume Cizeron; France	Victoria Sinitsina; Nikita Katsalapov; ROC	Madison Hubbell; Zachary Donohue; United States	
Team event	United States; Nathan Chen; Vincent Zhou; Karen Chen; Alexa Knierim; Brandon Frazier; Madison Hubbell; Zachary Donohue; Madison Chock; Evan Bates	Japan; Shoma Uno; Yuma Kagiyama; Wakaba Higuchi; Kaori Sakamoto; Riku Miura; Ryuichi Kihara; Misato Komatsubara; Tim Koleto	ROC; Mark Kondratiuk; ~~Kamila Valieva~~ (DSQ); Anastasia Mishina; Aleksandr Galliamov; Victoria Sinitsina; Nikita Katsalapov	

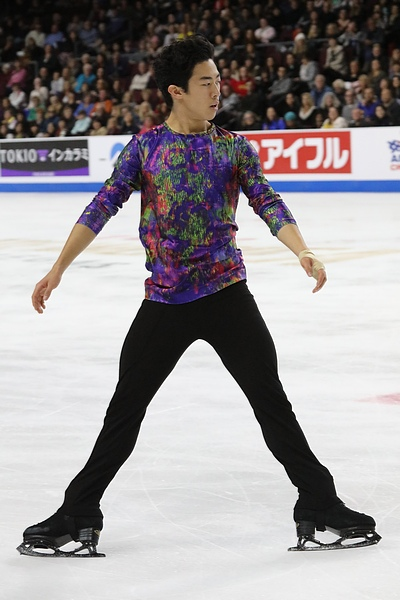
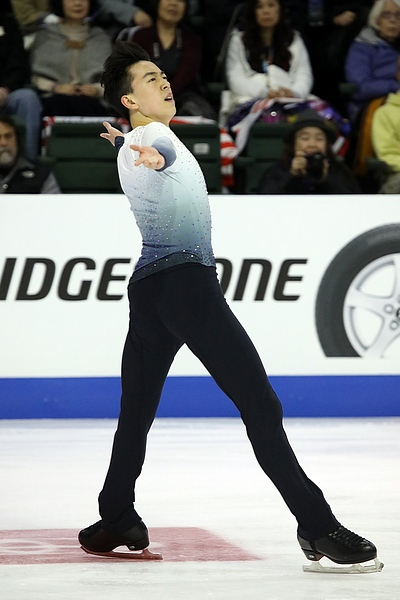
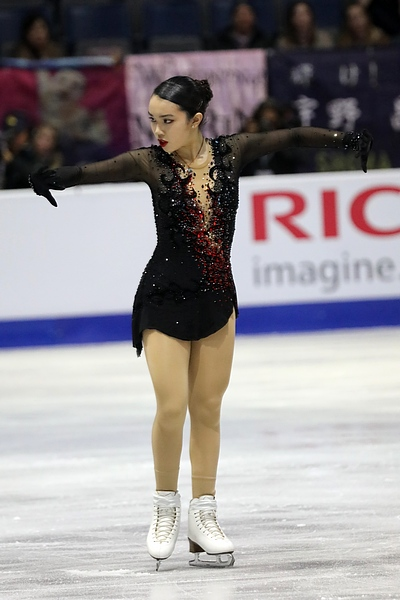
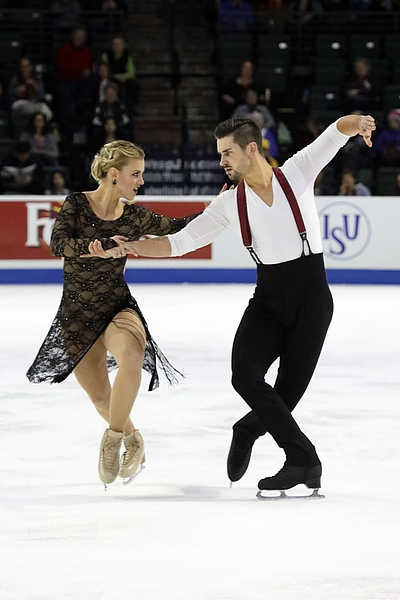
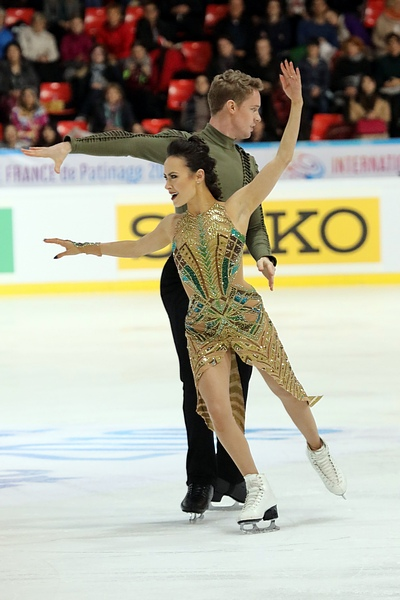
The U.S. figure skating team and gold medalists from the 2022 Winter Olympics (from left to right):
Nathan Chen; Vincent Zhou; Karen Chen; Madison Hubbell and Zachary Donohue; and Madison Chock and Evan Bates
(Not pictured: Alexa Knierim and Brandon Frazier)

=== Medal table ===
Rank	Nation	Gold	Silver	Bronze	Total
1	United States	2	0	1	3
2	ROC	1	3	2	6
3	China	1	0	0	1
3	France	1	0	0	1
5	Japan	0	2	2	4
Totals (5 entries)		5	5	5	15

== Records ==
The following new record high scores were set during this competition.

Record high scores
Date	Skater(s)	Event	Segment	Score	Ref.
4 February	(China); Sui Wenjing; Han Cong	Team event (Pairs)	Short program	82.83	
8 February	(United States); Nathan Chen	Men's singles	Short program	113.97	
12 February	(France); Gabriella Papadakis; Guillaume Cizeron	Ice dance	Rhythm dance	90.83	
14 February	(France); Gabriella Papadakis; Guillaume Cizeron	Ice dance	Total score	226.98	
18 February	(China); Sui Wenjing; Han Cong	Pair skating	Short program	84.41	
19 February	(China); Sui Wenjing; Han Cong	Pair skating	Total score	239.88	

== Kamila Valieva controversy ==
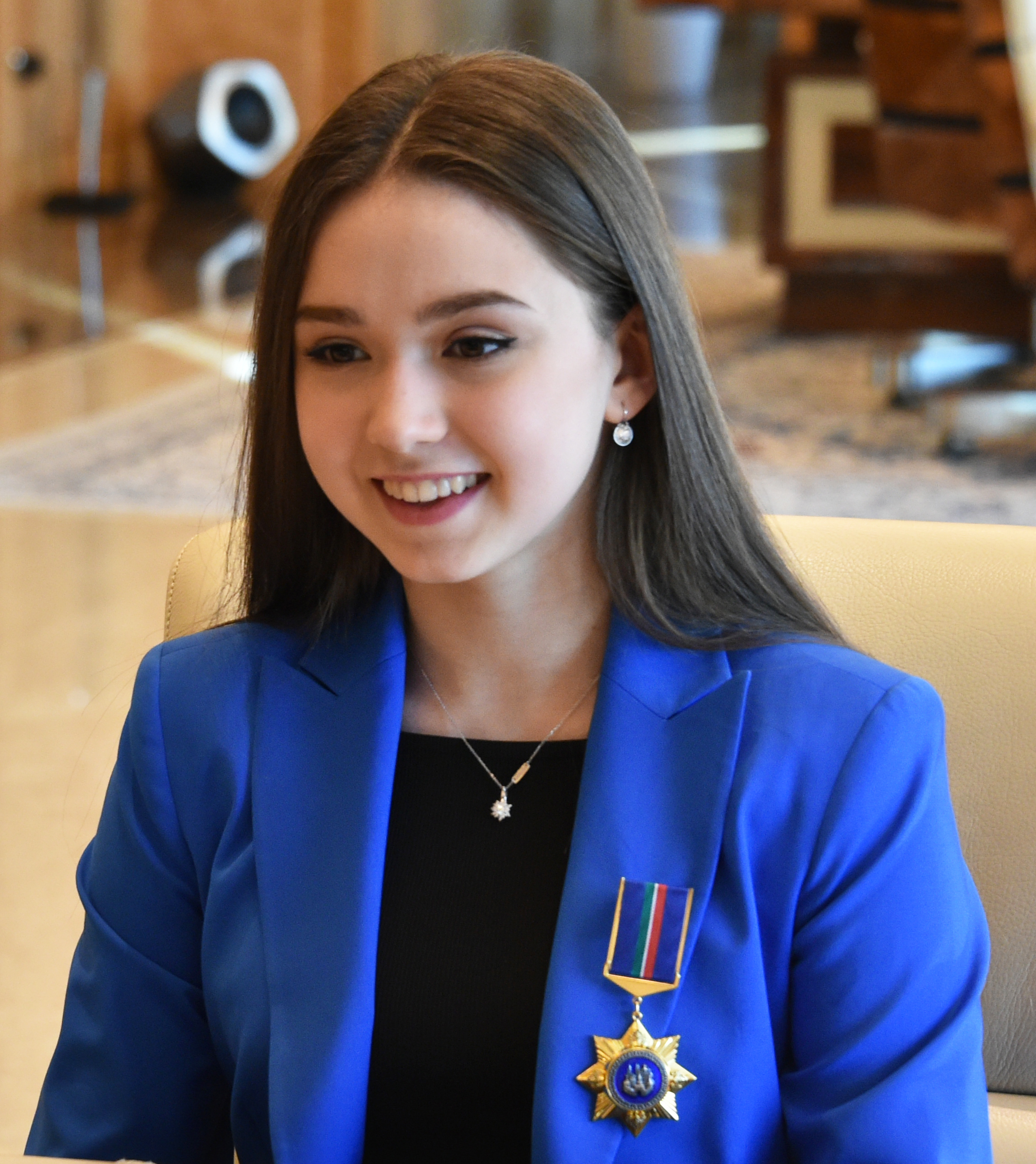
Kamila Valieva of Russia was suspended by the Court of Arbitration for Sport for a period of four years after testing positive for trimetazidine. Her results from the 2022 Winter Olympics were also struck.

The medal ceremony for the team event, originally scheduled for 8 February, was delayed over what International Olympic Committee (IOC) spokesperson Mark Adams described as a situation that required "legal consultation" with the International Skating Union (ISU). Media outlets reported on 9 February that the issue was a positive drug test, administered in December 2021, for trimetazidine by Kamila Valieva, which was officially confirmed on 11 February. The Russian Anti-Doping Agency (RUSADA), under suspension from the World Anti-Doping Agency (WADA) for hiding the positive doping results of Russian athletes for years, cleared Valieva to compete on 9 February, a day after the December test results were released. The IOC and the ISU appealed that decision.

On 14 February, the Court of Arbitration for Sport (CAS) ruled that Valieva be allowed to compete in the individual women's event, on the grounds that preventing her from competing "would cause her irreparable harm in the circumstances", though her gold medal in the team event was still under consideration. This decision from the Court was made in part due to her age, as minor athletes were subject to different rules than adult athletes. The IOC announced that the medal ceremony would not take place until the investigation was over and there was a concrete decision of whether to strip Russia of their medals.

In November 2022, the WADA requested that CAS take up the review of the case, seeking a four-year suspension of Valieva, which would exclude her from competition at the 2026 Winter Olympics, and to disqualify all of her results dating back to the date of her positive drug test (25 December 2021). WADA President Witold Bańka wrote that RUSADA did not meet a WADA-imposed deadline to deliver a verdict on Valieva's case. On 29 January 2024, the CAS disqualified Valieva for four years retroactive to 25 December 2021 for the positive test for trimetazidine, which they ruled constituted an anti-doping rule violation. On 30 January 2024, the ISU, among other actions, subtracted Valieva's points from Russia's score in the team event without changing any other scores, and reallocated the medals, upgrading the United States and Japan to gold and silver, respectively, while downgrading Russia to bronze. The American and Japanese teams received their medals at a ceremony which took place on 7 August 2024 during the 2024 Summer Olympics in Paris.

== Works cited ==
- "Qualification System for XXIV Olympic Winter Games, Beijing 2022". International Skating Union. 4 December 2019. Archived from the original on 28 September 2021.
