= Brendan Kerry =

Australian figure skater

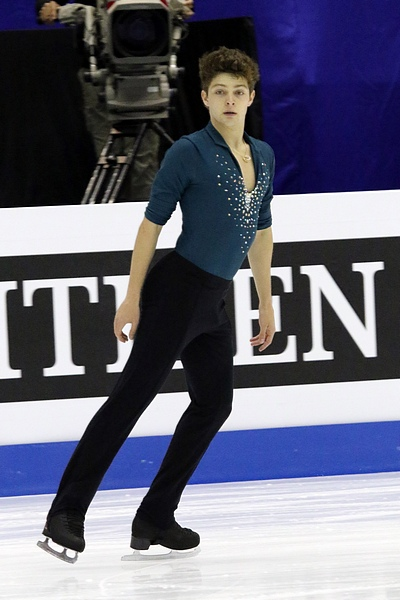
- Brendan Kerry at the 2016 Four Continents Championships

Personal information
- Born: 18 November 1994 (age 31) Sydney, Australia
- Height: 1.75 m (5 ft 9 in)

Figure skating career
- Country: Australia
- Discipline: Men's singles
- Began skating: 2004
- Highest WS: 24th (2021–22)

Medal record
Australian Championships
Gold medal – first place	2011 Brisbane	Singles
Gold medal – first place	2013 Melbourne	Singles
Gold medal – first place	2014 Brisbane	Singles
Gold medal – first place	2015 Sydney	Singles
Gold medal – first place	2016 Melbourne	Singles
Gold medal – first place	2017 Brisbane	Singles
Gold medal – first place	2018 Sydney	Singles
Gold medal – first place	2019 Melbourne	Singles
Silver medal – second place	2012 Brisbane	Singles

Brendan Kerry (born 18 November 1994) is an Australian figure skater. He is the 2017 CS Ondrej Nepela Trophy bronze medalist, the 2017 CS Lombardia Trophy bronze medalist, the 2019 Toruń Cup champion, the 2016 Egna Spring Trophy champion, and an eight-time Australian national champion (2011, 2013–2019).

Kerry has competed in the final segment at fifteen ISU Championships, achieving his highest placement, sixth, at the 2022 Four Continents. He placed 29th at the 2014 Winter Olympics, 20th at the 2018 Winter Olympics and 17th at the 2022 Winter Olympics.

In May 2024 Kerry was banned for life by the U.S. Center for SafeSport for repeated sexual misconduct involving a minor.

== Personal life ==
Brendan Kerry was born 18 November 1994 in Sydney. His mother, Monica MacDonald, competed in ice dancing at the 1988 Winter Olympics, and his sister, Chantelle Kerry is also a figure skater.

Kerry attended Epping Boys High School before transferring to Sydney Distance Education High School to focus on skating.

== Career ==
=== Early career ===
Kerry started skating in 2004. He debuted on the ISU Junior Grand Prix (JGP) series in 2008. He won the Australian national junior title in the 2009–2010 season. In 2011, Kerry made his senior international debut at the Four Continents Championships. He also competed at his first World Junior Championships.

In the 2011–2012 season, Kerry won the Australian national title on the senior level and was assigned to his first World Championships. He was cut after finishing 15th in the preliminary round at the event in Nice, France.

=== 2013–2014 season ===
In September 2013, Kerry was sent to the Nebelhorn Trophy, the final qualifying competition for the 2014 Winter Olympics. As a result of his 8th-place finish, Australia received one of the six remaining spots for countries that had not previously qualified a men's entry. He placed 5th in both of his JGP events. In January, he reached the free skate at the 2014 Four Continents Championships in Taipei and went on to finish 20th overall. In February, Kerry placed 29th in the short program at the Olympics in Sochi, Russia, scoring 47.12 points. With only the top 24 advancing, it was not enough to progress to the final segment. He ended his season at the 2014 World Junior Championships, held in March in Sofia, Bulgaria. He placed 19th in the short, 20th in the free, and 21st overall.

=== 2014–2015 season ===
Kerry competed at two events of the newly inaugurated ISU Challenger Series, placing 9th at the 2014 CS Lombardia Trophy and 11th at the 2014 CS Skate Canada Autumn Classic. He finished 17th at the 2015 Four Continents Championships in Seoul, South Korea. At his second World Championships, he qualified to the free skate for the first time by placing 17th in the short program. He finished 20th overall in Shanghai, China.

=== 2015–2016 season ===
Kerry was invited to his first-ever Grand Prix event, the 2015 Skate America. He placed 11th in the short program, 7th in the free skate, and 8th overall. On 23 November, he was added to the 2015 NHK Trophy. He finished 12th in Japan and 19th at the 2016 Four Continents in Taipei, Taiwan. In March, he placed 17th at the 2016 World Championships in Boston after ranking 17th in both segments. Soon after, Kerry placed second in the short and first in the free to win the gold medal at Gardena Spring Trophy 2016, in Egna, Italy, setting two ISU personal bests (short program and total combined score).

=== 2016–2017 season ===
Kerry was invited to two Grand Prix events, the 2016 Skate America and 2016 Trophée de France, and finished tenth at both. In December, he won his fifth national title. In February 2017, he finished 11th at the 2017 Four Continents Championships in Gangneung, South Korea, and fifth at the Asian Winter Games in Sapporo, Japan.

In March, Kerry placed 13th in the short, 15th in the free, and 15th overall at the 2017 World Championships in Helsinki, Finland. Due to his result, Australia qualified a spot in the men's event at the 2018 Winter Olympics in Pyeongchang, South Korea.

=== 2017–2018 season ===
Kerry opened his season in mid-September, winning a bronze medal at the 2017 CS Lombardia Trophy and becoming the first Australian men's skater to finish on a Challenger Series podium. A week later, he received the bronze medal at the 2017 CS Ondrej Nepela Trophy.

After parting ways with long-time coach Tammy Gambill, Kerry confirmed his relocation to Moscow to train with Russian coach, Nikolai Morozov in mid-November.

Kerry was named to the Australian team for the 2018 Winter Olympics in November 2017 and won his fifth consecutive senior national title at the 2017 Australian National Championships in Brisbane in December. He attended his second Winter Olympics, placing twentieth in the men's event. He placed eighteenth at the 2018 World Championships.

=== 2018–2019 season ===
After withdrawing from the Autumn Classic, Kerry placed eleventh and tenth at his two Grand Prix assignments, the 2018 Skate Canada International and 2018 Rostelecom Cup. Winning a sixth national title, he then placed ninth at the Four Continents Championships and twentieth at the World Championships.

=== 2019–2020 season ===
Kerry won his second consecutive Halloween Cup, and then began the Grand Prix at the 2019 Skate Canada International, where he placed twelfth of twelve skaters. Kerry was seventh at the 2019 Cup of China.

Kerry placed twelfth at the 2020 Four Continents Championships. He was assigned to compete at the World Championships in Montreal, but these were cancelled as a result of the coronavirus pandemic.

=== 2020–2021 season ===
With the pandemic continuing to affect international travel, Kerry was assigned to compete at the 2020 Internationaux de France, but this event was also cancelled. He competed at French Masters as an invited international skater, winning the bronze. He was later named to the Australian team for the 2021 World Championships in Stockholm but withdrew due to a foot injury.

=== 2021–2022 season ===
Kerry returned to international competition at the 2021 CS Nebelhorn Trophy, where he placed seventh, securing a berth for Australia at the 2022 Winter Olympics. He fared less well at the 2021 CS Finlandia Trophy, his second Challenger event of the season, coming in thirteenth. Initially without a Grand Prix assignment, he was eventually named as a replacement for Maxim Naumov at the 2021 Rostelecom Cup, where he finished twelfth of twelve skaters. Kerry assessed his own performance as "terrible and very bad." He finished the fall season at the 2021 CS Golden Spin of Zagreb, where he was sixth.

Due to Australian federation rules with no national championships being held, Kerry was sent to the 2022 Four Continents Championships in Tallinn to compete with James Min and Jordan Dodds for the men's berth on the Australian Olympic team. Kerry finished in sixth at the event, over seventy points clear of Min, admitting afterwards that "it was really frustrating having to try to compete for the Olympic spot I earned again, a week and a half ahead of the Olympic Games." Shortly afterwards, he was named to the Olympic team.

Kerry was named Australia's co-flagbearer for the opening ceremonies at the 2022 Winter Olympics, alongside freestyle skier Laura Peel. Kerry placed seventeenth in the short program of the men's event. Sixteenth in the free skate, he finished seventeenth overall.

=== 2022–2023 season ===
On July 22, Kerry was named to 2022 Skate America, but a few days later, Ice Skating Australia removed him from their assignments list, indicating he had withdrawn.

== Sexual misconduct ==
Kerry was the subject of two complaints of sexual misconduct, that allegedly took place when he was a registered coach with U.S. Figure Skating in the 2016-17 season, to the U.S. Center for SafeSport. American skater Gracie Gold alleged that he had raped her at a party in 2016, while in addition an unnamed skater alleged that he had supplied her with alcohol and engaged in sexual relations, including at times forcibly, while she was a minor and Kerry was an adult. Kerry admitted to the latter relationship, but stated he had been unaware of her age. He also admitted to having engaged in sexual intercourse with Gold, but stated that it had been consensual. SafeSport ruled that there was insufficient evidence to prove Gold's allegation, but substantiated the other skater's allegation. On May 14, 2024, it was announced that SafeSport had issued a lifetime ban on Kerry's involvement in any activities under the jurisdiction of the United States Olympic & Paralympic Committee, due to his sexual misconduct with a minor.

On May 15, 2024, The Australian Professional Skaters' Association announced its own investigation into Kerry's sexual misconduct allegations. The association's president – who is also Kerry's mother – Monica MacDonald, stepped down from her position pending the investigation.

After the SafeSport ban was announced, Kerry withdrew from coaching at the Macquarie Ice Rink by mutual agreement with Australian figure skating authorities. Kerry said that he has agreed to step away from coaching while he appeals the decision. Kerry has denied any wrongdoing and announced his intent to appeal the suspension.

== Programs ==
Season	Short program	Free skating
2021–2022	Leave a Light On by Tom Walker	Sevenlere Dair (To the Lovers) Op. 12/3 by Fazıl Say; 85 by Travis Lake; Emergence by 2WEI; Butterflies and Hurricanes by Muse; Come Alive; A Million Dreams; The Greatest Show (from The Greatest Showman) by Benj Pasek & Justin Paul
2019–2020	Puttin' On the Ritz by Irving Berlin performed by Terry Snyder; Mah Nà Mah Nà by Piero Umiliani performed by LeRoy Holmes choreo. by Nikolai Morozov	Discombobulate; Data Data Data (from Sherlock Holmes) by Hans Zimmer choreo. by Nikolai Morozov
2018–2019	Prelude - Havas by Hans Zimmer choreo. by Nikolai Morozov, Florent Amodio	You're the One That I Want performed by Lo-Fang; Greased Lightnin' performed by John Travolta; You're the One That I Want performed by Olivia Newton-John and John Travolta choreo. by Nikolai Morozov, Florent Amodio
2017–2018	Everybody Wants to Rule the World performed by London Symphony Orchestra feat. Spencer Jones and Mckenna Breinholt choreo. by Mark Pillay	Valley Of Dreams by John Tesh choreo. by Nikolai Morozov
2016–2017	Singin' in the Rain by Arthur Freed, Nacio Herb Brown	Pirates of the Caribbean: The Curse of the Black Pearl by Hans Zimmer, Klaus Badelt
2015–2016	Blue Drag; Boilermaker Jazz Band by Allen Toussaint	Beethoven's Five Secrets by OneRepublic
2014–2015	Blue Drag; Boilermaker Jazz Band by Allen Toussaint	Amélie by Yann Tiersen; Micmacs by Raphaël Beau; Iris by Danny Elfman
2013–2014	Nothing Else Matters by Metallica performed by David Garrett	Gangster Squad by Steve Jablonsky
2012–2013	Nothing Else Matters by Metallica performed by David Garrett	Angelica; Angry and Dead Again by Hans Zimmer both performed by Rodrigo y Gabriela
2011–2012	Third Movement Vivace Presto by Jon Lord	Dark Angel by Edvin Marton; Horizon by Paul Schwartz; Dark Angel by Edvin Marton
2010–2011	Sherlock Holmes by Hans Zimmer; Psychological Recovery; Catatonic	Dark Angel by Edvin Marton; Horizon by Paul Schwartz; Dark Angel by Edvin Marton
2009–2010	Final Flight by Toman Dandy; Faster by L Jules X	Smooth Criminal; Dirty Diana; Thriller; Beat It by Michael Jackson

== Competitive highlights ==
- GP – Event of the ISU Grand Prix Series
- JGP – Event of the ISU Junior Grand Prix Series
- CS – Event of the ISU Challenger Series
- C – Event was cancelled
- WD – Withdrew from competition

Competition placements at senior level
Season	2010–11	2011–12	2012–13	2013–14	2014–15	2015–16	2016–17	2017–18	2018–19	2019–20	2020–21	2021–22
Winter Olympics				29th				20th				17th
World Championships		33rd			20th	17th	15th	18th	20th	C	WD	WD
Four Continents Championships	18th	19th	21st	20th	17th	19th	11th	13th	9th	12th		6th
Australian Championships		1st	2nd	1st	1st	1st	1st	1st	1st	1st	C	C
GP Cup of China										7th		
GP France							10th				C	
GP NHK Trophy						12th						
GP Rostelecom Cup									10th			12th
GP Skate America						8th	10th					
GP Skate Canada								11th	11th	12th		
CS Autumn Classic					11th				WD			
CS Finlandia Trophy												13th
CS Golden Spin of Zagreb							5th					6th
CS Lombardia Trophy					9th			3rd				
CS Nebelhorn Trophy				8th								7th
CS Nepela Memorial								3rd				
CS U.S. Classic							4th					
Asian Winter Games							5th					
Gardena Spring Trophy						1st						
Halloween Cup									1st	1st		
Master's de Patinage											3rd	
Mentor Toruń Cup					5th				1st	3rd		
Nordic Championships						3rd						
Shanghai Trophy										5th		
Skate Down Under				1st								

Competition placements at junior level
Season	2008–09	2009–10	2010–11	2011–12	2013–14
World Junior Championships			33rd	22nd	21st
Australian Championships	2nd	1st	1st		
JGP Australia				14th	
JGP Estonia					5th
JGP Germany		21st	20th		
JGP Great Britain	25th		14th		
JGP Latvia					5th
JGP United States		15th			
New Zealand Winter Games				3rd	

== Detailed results ==
ISU personal best scores in the +5/-5 GOE System
Segment	Type	Score	Event
Total	TSS	244.80	2022 Winter Olympics
Short program	TSS	85.89	2021 CS Nebelhorn Trophy
Short program	TES	47.79	2021 CS Nebelhorn Trophy
Short program	PCS	38.86	2022 Winter Olympics
Free skating	TSS	160.01	2022 Winter Olympics
Free skating	TES	83.51	2022 Winter Olympics
Free skating	PCS	76.56	2019 Cup of China

ISU personal best scores in the +3/-3 GOE System
Segment	Type	Score	Event
Total	TSS	236.24	2017 World Championships
Short program	TSS	83.11	2017 World Championships
Short program	TES	47.61	2017 World Championships
Short program	PCS	37.57	2018 Winter Olympics
Free skating	TSS	153.13	2017 World Championships
Free skating	TES	80.15	2017 CS Lombardia Trophy
Free skating	PCS	77.42	2018 Winter Olympics

=== Senior level ===
Results in the 2019–20 season
Date	Event	SP		FS		Total	
Date	Event	P	Score	P	Score	P	Score
Oct 3–5, 2019	(China) 2019 Shanghai Trophy	3	78.45	5	128.59	5	207.04
Oct 17–20, 2019	(Hungary) 2019 Halloween Cup	1	79.00	1	134.80	1	213.80
Oct 25–27, 2019	2019 Skate Canada International	12	56.75	9	137.02	12	193.77
Nov 8–10, 2019	2019 Cup of China	9	73.96	7	146.35	7	220.31
Nov 30 – Dec 6, 2020	(Australia) 2019–20 Australian Championships	1	79.28	1	136.83	1	216.11
Jan 7–12, 2020	(Poland) 2020 Mentor Toruń Cup	4	62.26	3	131.39	3	193.65
Feb 4–9, 2020	(South Korea) 2020 Four Continents Championships	12	76.70	14	136.41	12	213.11

Results in the 2020–21 season
Date	Event	SP		FS		Total	
Date	Event	P	Score	P	Score	P	Score
Oct 1–3, 2020	(France) 2020 Master's de Patinage	2	84.20	3	132.30	3	216.50

Results in the 2021–22 season
Date	Event	SP		FS		Total	
Date	Event	P	Score	P	Score	P	Score
Sep 22–25, 2021	(Germany) 2021 CS Nebelhorn Trophy	3	85.89	7	133.06	7	218.95
Oct 7–10, 2021	(Finland) 2021 CS Finlandia Trophy	13	66.13	11	138.62	13	204.75
Nov 26–28, 2021	(Russia) 2021 Rostelecom Cup	8	80.48	12	123.71	12	204.19
Dec 7–11, 2021	(Croatia) 2021 CS Golden Spin of Zagreb	3	84.36	9	147.00	6	231.36
Jan 18–23, 2022	(Estonia) 2022 Four Continents Championships	4	81.12	8	146.45	6	227.57
Feb 4–20, 2022	(China) 2022 Winter Olympics	17	84.79	16	160.01	17	244.80
