= Figure skating at the 2022 Winter Olympics – Qualification =

The number of entries for the figure skating events at the Winter Olympics is determined by quotas set by the International Olympic Committee. A total of 144 quota spots were available to athletes to compete in the figure skating events at the 2022 Winter Olympics. There were 30 spots allotted each in men's and women's singles, 19 in pair skating, and 23 in ice dance. Additionally, ten nations qualified for the team event. There is no individual athlete qualification to the Olympics; the choice of whom to send is at the discretion of each country's National Olympic Committee. Each National Olympic Committee could enter up to 18 skaters total, with a maximum of nine men or nine women. Japan, Russia, and the United States ultimately earned three quota spots each in the men's and women's events; Russia earned three quota spots in the pairs' event; and Canada, Russia, and the United States earned three quota spots each in the ice dance event.

== Qualification of nations ==
Countries were able to qualify entries to the 2022 Winter Olympics in two ways. Most spots were allocated based on the results of the 2021 World Figure Skating Championships. There, countries were able to qualify up to three entries in each discipline according to a predetermined system. The results of the 2021 World Championships determined 83 total spots: 24 entries each in men's and women's singles, 16 in pairs, and 19 in ice dance.

The remainder of the spots were filled at the 2021 Nebelhorn Trophy in late September 2021. Countries that had already earned an entry to the Olympics were not allowed to qualify additional entries at this final qualifying competition. However, if a country had earned two or three spots at the World Championships, but did not have two or three skaters, respectively, qualify for the free skate, then they were allowed to send a skater who did not reach the free segment at the World Championships to the Nebelhorn Trophy to qualify the remaining spot(s). Unlike at the World Championships, where countries could qualify more than one spot depending on the placement of their skater(s), at the Nebelhorn Trophy, countries could earn only one spot per discipline, regardless of ranking.

Initially, a total of six spots per singles event, three spots in pairs, and four in ice dance were available at the Nebelhorn Trophy. One additional quota spot became available in men's singles following the 2021 World Championships. According to guidelines established by the International Skating Union (ISU), nations had to select skaters and teams who had achieved a minimum Total Elements Score at an ISU-recognized international competition on or before 24 January 2022.

For the team event, scores from the 2021 World Figure Skating Championships and the 2021–22 Grand Prix of Figure Skating season were tabulated to establish the top ten nations. Each nation compiled a score from their top performers in each of the four disciplines. The 2021 Grand Prix of Figure Skating Final, which was to be held in December 2021, was to be the final event to affect the team event score, but it was cancelled.

== Qualified nations ==
Number of qualified skaters or teams per nation
Nations	Men's singles	Women's singles	Pairs	Ice dance	Team event	Add.	Skater(s)
Armenia				1			2
Australia	1	1					2
Austria		1	1				3
Azerbaijan	1	1					2
Belarus	1	1					2
Belgium		1					1
Bulgaria		1					1
Canada	2	1	2	3	Yes		13
China	1	1	2	1	Yes		8
Czech Republic	1	1	1	1	Yes		6
Estonia	1	1					2
Finland		1		1			3
France	2			1			4
Georgia	1	1	1	1	Yes		6
Germany		1	1	1	Yes	1 (Note: Paul Fentz of Germany competed in the team event, but not the men's individual event.)	6
Great Britain		1		1			3
Hungary			1				2
Israel	1		1				3
Italy	2		2	1	Yes	1 (Note: Lara Naki Gutmann of Italy competed in the team event, but not the women's individual event.)	9
Japan	3	3	1	1	Yes		10
Latvia	1						1
Lithuania				1			2
Mexico	1						1
Netherlands		1					1
Poland		1		1			3
ROC	3	3	3	3	Yes		18
South Korea	2	2					4
Spain			1	1			4
Sweden	1	1					2
Switzerland	1	1					2
Ukraine	1	1		1	Yes	2 (Note: Sofiia Holichenko and Artem Darenskyi of Ukraine competed in the team event, but not the pairs event.)	6
United States	3	3	2	3	Yes		16
Total: 32 NOCs	30	30	19 teams	23 teams	10 teams	4	148

== Qualification summary ==
=== Men's singles ===
Twenty-three quota spots in the men's event were awarded based on the results at the 2021 World Figure Skating Championships. Only twenty-three spots out of a possible twenty-four were awarded, because, while Yan Han and Jin Boyang of China both qualified for the free skate, they only earned enough points to qualify China for one Olympic entry. Therefore, the extra quota spot was made available at the 2021 Nebelhorn Trophy along with the other six slots originally allocated.

Qualifying nations in men's singles
Event	Skaters per NOC	Qualifying NOCs	Total skaters
2021 World Championships	3	Japan	23
2021 World Championships	2	United States; ROC; Italy	23
2021 World Championships	1	Canada; France; South Korea; China; Georgia; Switzerland; Estonia; Belarus; Latvia; Czech Republic; Mexico; Ukraine; Sweden; Israel	23
2021 Nebelhorn Trophy	1	United States; France; ROC; South Korea; Azerbaijan; Australia; Canada	7
Total			30

=== Women's singles ===
Twenty-four quota spots in the women's event were awarded based on results at the 2021 World Championships. An additional six quota spots were earned at the 2021 Nebelhorn Trophy.

Qualifying nations in women's singles
Event	Skaters per NOC	Qualifying NOCs	Total skaters
2021 World Championships	3	ROC; Japan	24
2021 World Championships	2	United States; South Korea	24
2021 World Championships	1	Belgium; Austria; Azerbaijan; Canada; Estonia; Sweden; Netherlands; Bulgaria; Germany; Georgia; China; Czech Republic; Great Britain; Finland	24
2021 Nebelhorn Trophy	1	United States; Poland; Belarus; Switzerland; Ukraine; Australia	6
Total			30

=== Pairs ===
Sixteen quota spots in the pairs event were awarded based on results at the 2021 World Championships. An additional three quota spots were earned at the 2021 Nebelhorn Trophy.

Qualifying nations in pairs
Event	Teams per NOC	Qualifying NOCs	Total teams
2021 World Championships	3	ROC	16
2021 World Championships	2	China; Canada; United States; Italy	16
2021 World Championships	1	Japan; Austria; Germany; Hungary; Czech Republic	16
2021 Nebelhorn Trophy	1	Spain; Georgia; Israel	3
Total			19

=== Ice dance ===
Nineteen quota spots in the ice dance event were awarded based on results at the 2021 World Championships. An additional four quota spots were earned at the 2021 Nebelhorn Trophy.

Qualifying nations in ice dance
Event	Teams per NOC	Qualifying NOCs	Total teams
2021 World Championships	3	ROC; United States; Canada	19
2021 World Championships	1	Italy; Great Britain; Spain; Poland; China; Lithuania; France; Germany; Japan; Ukraine	19
2021 Nebelhorn Trophy	1	Finland; Georgia; Armenia; Czech Republic	4
Total			23

=== Team event ===
In order for a nation to qualify for the team event, it had to have qualified entrants in at least three of the four disciplines (men's singles, women's singles, pair skating, or ice dance). If there were not ten nations that had qualified entrants in all four disciplines, nations with three entrants could use an Additional Athlete Quota to fill their team. These additional athletes were eligible to compete in the team event, but not in the individual Olympic events. The nations which qualified for the team event at the 2022 Winter Olympics are identified with a green check mark ( ✓) in the last column.

Qualification for figure skating team event
Pl.	Nation	M	W	P	D	Total	(International Olympic Committee)
1	ROC	Yes	Yes	Yes	Yes	5947	Yes
2	United States	Yes	Yes	Yes	Yes	5209	Yes
3	Canada	Yes	Yes	Yes	Yes	3949	Yes
4	Japan	Yes	Yes	Yes	Yes	3830	Yes
5	China	Yes	Yes	Yes	Yes	2809	Yes
6	Italy	Yes	(Note: Although Italy did not qualify a women's singles skater for the team event, they were able to use an Additional Athlete Quota in order to complete their team.)	Yes	Yes	2774	Yes
7	France	Yes	No	No	Yes	1878	No
8	South Korea	Yes	Yes	No	No	1781	No
9	Germany	(Note: Although Germany did not qualify a men's singles skater for the team event, they were able to use an Additional Athlete Quota in order to complete their team.)	Yes	Yes	Yes	1480	Yes
10	Great Britain	No	Yes	No	Yes	1474	No
11	Georgia	Yes	Yes	Yes	Yes	1472	Yes
12	Austria	No	Yes	Yes	No	1183	No
13	Estonia	Yes	Yes	No	No	1162	No
14	Czech Republic	Yes	Yes	Yes	Yes	1137	Yes
15	Belgium	No	Yes	No	No	1111	No
16	Belarus	Yes	Yes	No	No	896	No
17	Ukraine	Yes	Yes	(Note: Although Ukraine did not qualify a pair skating team for the team event, they were able to use an Additional Athlete Quota in order to complete their team.)	Yes	893	Yes

=== Top four NOCs on waitlist per discipline ===
If a country rejected a quota spot, then the additional quota became available. A country could be eligible for one quota spot per event in the reallocation process. The following list was compiled after the remaining spots were allocated at the 2021 Nebelhorn Trophy. No quota spots were vacated after the Nebelhorn Trophy.

Quota spot waitlist
Men's singles	Women's singles	Pairs	Ice dance
Turkey; Armenia; Great Britain; Germany	Italy; Cyprus; Chinese Taipei; Slovenia	China; Belarus; Australia; Netherlands	Hungary; South Korea; Italy; Australia
