= Roman Sadovsky =

Canadian figure skater (born 1999)

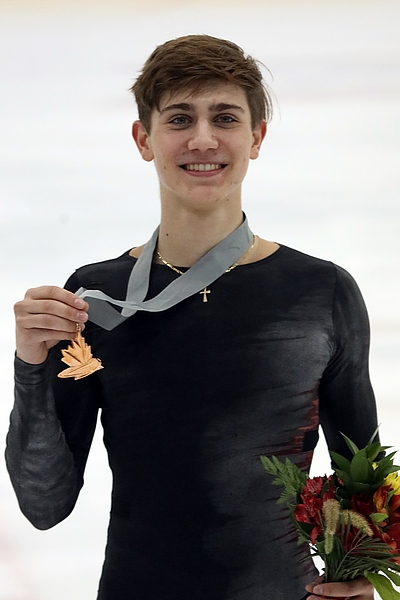
- Roman Sadovsky at the 2018 Autumn Classic International

Personal information
- Born: May 31, 1999 (age 27) Toronto, Ontario, Canada
- Home town: Vaughan, Ontario
- Height: 1.84 m (6 ft 0 in)

Figure skating career
- Country: Canada
- Discipline: Men's singles
- Coach: Gregor Filipowski; Tracey Wainman
- Skating club: York Region Skating Centre
- Began skating: 2005
- Highest WS: 26th (2025-26)

Medal record
Canadian Championships
Gold medal – first place	2020 Mississauga	Singles
Gold medal – first place	2025 Laval	Singles
Silver medal – second place	2022 Ottawa	Singles
Silver medal – second place	2026 Gatineau	Singles

Roman Sadovsky

YouTube information
- Channel: Romsky
- Years active: 2017–present
- Genres: Comedy; Sports; Questions and Answers; Video Blogs; Reactions
- Subscribers: 27.1 thousand
- Views: 2.2 million

Roman Sadovsky (born May 31, 1999) is a Canadian figure skater and YouTuber. He is the 2019 NHK Trophy bronze medalist, a six-time ISU Challenger Series medalist (1 gold, 1 silver, 4 bronze), and a two-time Canadian national champion (2020, 2025). He also represented Canada at the 2022 Winter Olympics.

On the junior level, he is a two-time ISU Junior Grand Prix gold medalist and placed fourth at the 2016 Winter Youth Olympics.

== Personal life ==
Sadovsky was born on May 31, 1999, in Toronto, Ontario, Canada. His parents moved to Canada from Ukraine, with his mother being from Lviv, and his father from Ivano-Frankivsk. His idol is Jeffrey Buttle, whom he credits as being the most important inspiration in his skating career; as a boy, Sadovsky wanted to emulate Buttle's skating style. After attending Christ The King CES, he continued his education at Bill Crothers Secondary School.

== Career ==
=== Early years ===
Sadovsky began learning to skate at the age of five years to play hockey. Tracey Wainman started coaching him when he was eight. Another early coach was Allen Carson.

=== 2012–13 season: Junior debut ===
Making his Junior Grand Prix debut, Sadovsky won a bronze medal in Lake Placid, New York, and placed tenth in Bled, Slovenia. He withdrew from the 2013 Canadian Championships due to a metatarsal fracture in his right foot.

=== 2013–14 season ===
Coached by Tracey Wainman and Grzegorz Filipowski at the York Region Skating Academy in Richmond Hill, Ontario, Sadovsky competed in two events of the 2013 Junior Grand Prix series, placing fourteenth in Riga, Latvia, and eighth in Minsk, Belarus. Nationally, he appeared on the senior level, finishing eighth at the 2014 Canadian Championships. He was selected for the 2014 World Junior Championships in Sofia, Bulgaria. Ranked fourteenth in the short program and twelfth in the free skate, he finished thirteenth overall.

=== 2014–15 season: Junior Grand Prix gold ===
Sadovsky's first assignment of the 2014 Junior Grand Prix series was in Ostrava, Czech Republic. Ranked first in the short program and third in the free skate, he finished first overall by a margin of 3.39 points over the silver medalist, Alexander Samarin. After the event, Sadovsky said his goal was to develop a solid triple Axel. He then went on to place fourth at his second JGP event in Dresden, Germany. With those results, Sadovsky qualified for the 2014 JGP Final and placed fifth.

At the 2015 Canadian Championships, Sadovsky placed fourth. He ended his season with a fourteenth-place finish at the 2015 World Junior Championships.

=== 2015–16 season ===
In the 2015 Junior Grand Prix season, Sadovsky was assigned to the first event, held in Bratislava, Slovakia. With a quad Salchow in the free skate — Sadovsky's first quad in competition — he won the gold medal with a total score 2.87 points ahead of Vincent Zhou. He then went on to win bronze at his second JGP event, in Toruń, Poland. These results qualified him for the 2015 JGP Final, where he was sixth. He represented Canada at the 2016 Winter Youth Olympics and finished fourth. He was coached by Wainman and Filipowski.

=== 2016–17 season ===
Sadovsky changed coaches, joining Brian Orser and Lee Barkell at the Toronto Cricket, Skating and Curling Club. He placed ninth at the 2017 Canadian Championships. Ranked ninth in the short program and twenty-third in the free skate, he finished seventeenth at the 2017 World Junior Championships in Taipei, Taiwan.

=== 2017–18 season: Senior international debut ===
Sadovsky switched back to Wainman and Filipowski. Making his Grand Prix debut, he placed tenth at the 2017 Skate America. He finished seventh at the 2018 Canadian Championships.

=== 2018–19 season ===
Sadovsky began the season at the 2018 CS Autumn Classic International, where he placed fourth in both the short and free programs, winning the bronze medal, his first senior medal. Sadovsky landed his first quad toe loop jump in competition. He then placed twelfth at the 2018 Skate Canada International, after struggling in both of his programs, and won the silver medal at the 2018 Inge Solar Memorial.

Sadovsky placed fifth in the short program at the 2019 Canadian Championships, but dropped to seventh place overall following a difficult free skate.

=== 2019–20 season: Grand Prix bronze and First national title ===
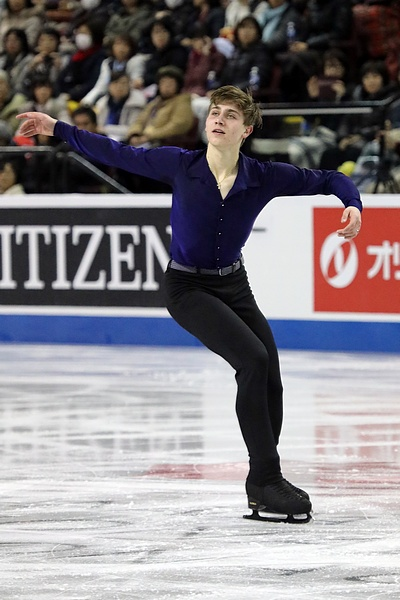
Sadovsky performing his short program at 2019 Skate Canada International

Starting the season on the Challenger series, Sadovsky won the bronze medal at the 2019 CS Finlandia Trophy after placing third in the short program and fourth in the free skate.

Sadovsky placed tenth at Skate Canada International, his first Grand Prix assignment for the season. Competing next at the 2019 NHK Trophy, Sadovsky placed fourth in the short program despite making two jump errors, one of them costing him the second part of his combination. He was second in the free skate, making only two minor errors on his second triple Axel and closing triple Lutz, and placed third overall, taking his first ever Grand Prix medal.

Entering the 2020 Canadian Championships as a contender for the title, Sadovsky placed third in the short program behind Keegan Messing and Nam Nguyen, having had two of his jumps called as underrotated. He then won the free skate with only two minor jump errors on his triple loop and second triple Axel. Sadovsky won his first national title by a margin of over seventeen points. Sadovsky was named to one of Canada's three men's berths at the 2020 Four Continents Championships, but Skate Canada declined to immediately decide who would be Canada's sole men's representative at the 2020 World Championships in Montreal. Sadovsky placed sixteenth at Four Continents, and thus was not chosen for the World Championships.

=== 2020–21 season ===
Sadovsky was assigned to compete at the 2020 Skate Canada International, but the event was cancelled as a result of the coronavirus pandemic.

On November 9, Sadovsky revealed the choreography for his free program to "Chasing Cars" by the Irish band Snow Patrol, which was uploaded to his YouTube channel.

With the pandemic making it difficult to hold in-person events, the 2021 Skate Canada Challenge, the main qualifying competition for the national championships, was held virtually. Sadovsky placed first in both the short program and the free skate, taking the gold medal over Nam Nguyen by a margin of 5.58 points. Due to the cancellation of the 2021 Canadian Championships, many called this a de facto national title.

Sadovsky was named as an alternate to the 2021 World Championships with the lone men's berth going to Keegan Messing. With Canada's mandatory two-week quarantine for returning athletes, however, no member of the World team was assigned to the 2021 World Team Trophy, and Sadovsky was assigned as one of Canada's two men's entries alongside Nguyen. Sadovsky placed sixth in the short program at World Team Trophy, setting a new personal best, but was tenth of eleven skaters in the free skate. Team Canada finished in sixth place.

=== 2021–22 season: Beijing Olympics ===
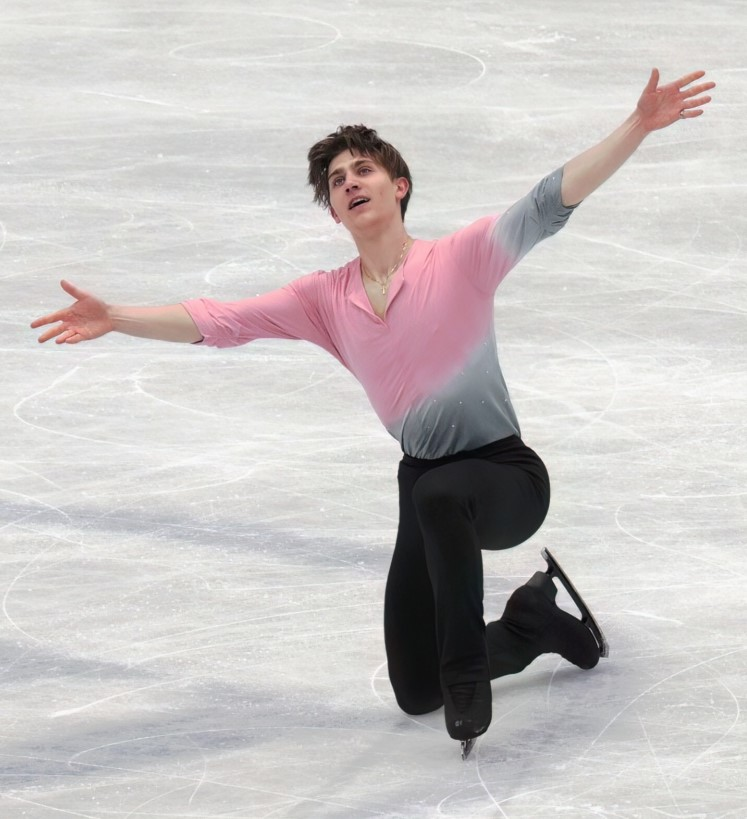
Sadovsky performing his free skate at the 2022 World Championships

In the leadup to the 2022 Winter Olympics, Sadovsky was assigned to the 2021 CS Nebelhorn Trophy to qualify a second Olympic berth for Canadian men following the results of the 2021 World Championships earlier in the year. Sadovsky placed eighth in the event after struggling with his jumps in both segments but managed to secure the seventh of seven available spots. He remarked afterward that "mentally, I thought it would be better. My training was really good, my practices and warm-up were excellent. But the moment the music is turned on, it changes."

On the Grand Prix at the 2021 Skate Canada International, Sadovsky placed twelfth of twelve skaters. He significantly improved at this second event, the 2021 Rostelecom Cup, where he placed fourth with new personal bests in the free skate and total score. He remarked he was "very, very pleased" with the results after early struggles.

Sadovsky placed fourth in the short program at the 2022 Canadian Championships after failing to execute a jump combination. He placed second in the free skate, his only notable error being a doubled attempt at a triple Lutz, taking the silver medal. On January 9 he was named to the Canadian Olympic team alongside Keegan Messing.

Messing was originally meant to be the Canadian entry in the men's short program of the Olympic team event, but after positive COVID-19 tests, he was unable to travel to China in time, with the task falling to Sadovsky as a result. He performed poorly in the short program, placing eighth of nine skaters and securing only three points for Canada. Canada ultimately qualified for the second phase of the competition, with Sadovsky also skating the free segment. Making numerous jump errors, he finished last in the segment and described his performance as "really shaky” and that it felt like he were in “somebody else’s body." He expressed hope that he could "use this opportunity to find that comfort in the singles event." Team Canada finished fourth overall. Sadovsky fared no better in the men's event, making errors on all three jump attempts and finishing last in the short program, failing to qualify for the free skate.

Sadovsky concluded his season at the 2022 World Championships. Eighteenth in the short program, he delivered a strong free skate and finished ninth in that segment, rising to twelfth overall. Sadovsky later revealed that he had suffered a strained hip flexor after falling on the triple Axel in his short program but was able to work through it on his day off and compete in the free skate.

=== 2022–23 season ===
Sadovsky intended to skate to "Fix You" by Coldplay for his free program this season. However, he dropped the program after High Performance Camp. He then returned to his old program of "Chasing Cars" by Snow Patrol, with which he competed at the 2022 CS Nebelhorn Trophy. Sadovsky placed first in the short program with a clean skate but dropped to the bronze medal position after the free skate, which he said: "wasn't quite what I wanted." He shared the Fritz Geiger Memorial Trophy with the rest of the Canadian delegation, awarded to the top country at the competition.

On the Grand Prix, Sadovsky's first event was the 2022 Skate America, where he finished in fifth place after debuting a new free program to "Angels" by Robbie Williams. He called his performance "an improvement from my last competition" overall. At his second event, the 2022 MK John Wilson Trophy, Sadovsky finished first in the short program with a score just slightly off his personal best, despite putting his free foot down on the landing of his jump combination. However, he made several errors in the free skate, finishing eighth in that segment and dropping to sixth overall.

Sadovsky's season finished on a disappointing note at the 2023 Canadian Championships, where he placed eighth after two error-strewn programs.

In his extended off-season, Sadovsky travelled to Japan to train with Takeshi Honda. He also travelled to Montreal to work with new choreographer Samuel Chouinard. Sadovsky also used this time to master the quadruple toe loop and begin developing the quadruple Lutz.

=== 2023–24 season ===
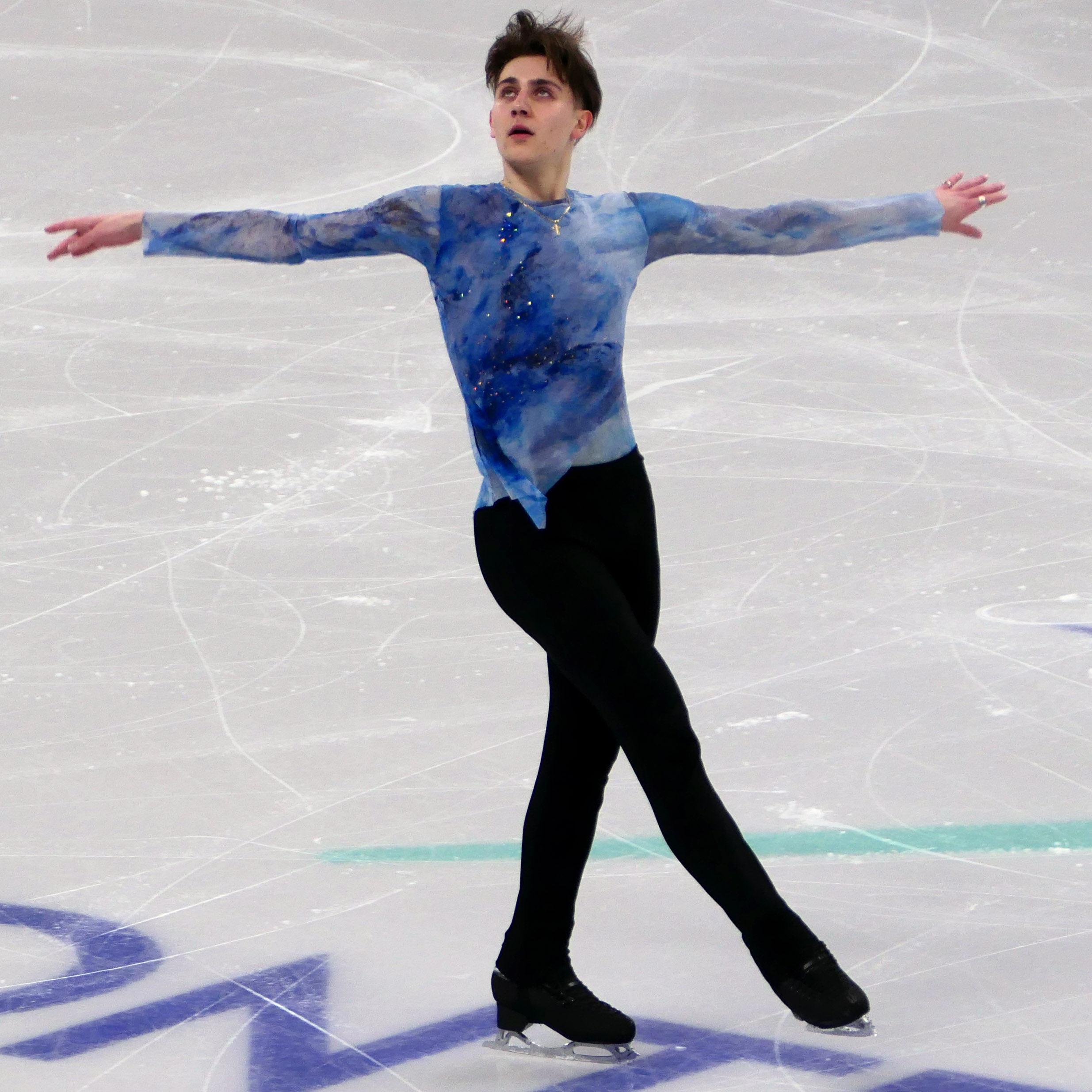
Sadovsky during his free skate at the 2024 World Championships

Sadovsky was scheduled to begin his season at the Cranberry Cup International in Norwood, Massachusetts, but withdrew after injuring his ankle in training in the days leading up to it. As a result, in October 2023, it was announced that he had also withdrawn from the 2023 Skate Canada International. Sadovsky then went on to compete at Skate Ontario Sectional championships, where he won the short, and withdrew from the free. To compensate for his missed Grand Prix, Skate Canada assigned him to compete on the Challenger series at the 2023 CS Warsaw Cup. However, his luggage containing his skates was lost while in transit to Warsaw, and as a result he was unable to compete at the event. He was instead reassigned to the 2023 CS Golden Spin of Zagreb, but encountered further difficulties when his flight was unable to land due to weather, and missed that competition as well.

Finally making his first major event of the season at the 2024 Canadian Championships in Calgary, Sadovsky placed seventh in the short program after multiple jump errors. Despite several free skate errors, he rose one ordinal to sixth overall.

Skate Canada initially declined to name its team for the 2024 World Championships, pending the results of the 2024 Four Continents Championships in Shanghai, China, which Sadovsky attended with Wesley Chiu and Conrad Orzel. He finished tenth, second among the Canadians, behind Chiu. Shortly afterward, he and Chiu were named to the team for the home ice World Championships in Montreal, Quebec, Canada. Sadovsky had a strong short program at the World Championships, coming eleventh in the segment, but a poor free skate dropped him to nineteenth.

=== 2024–25 season: Second national title ===
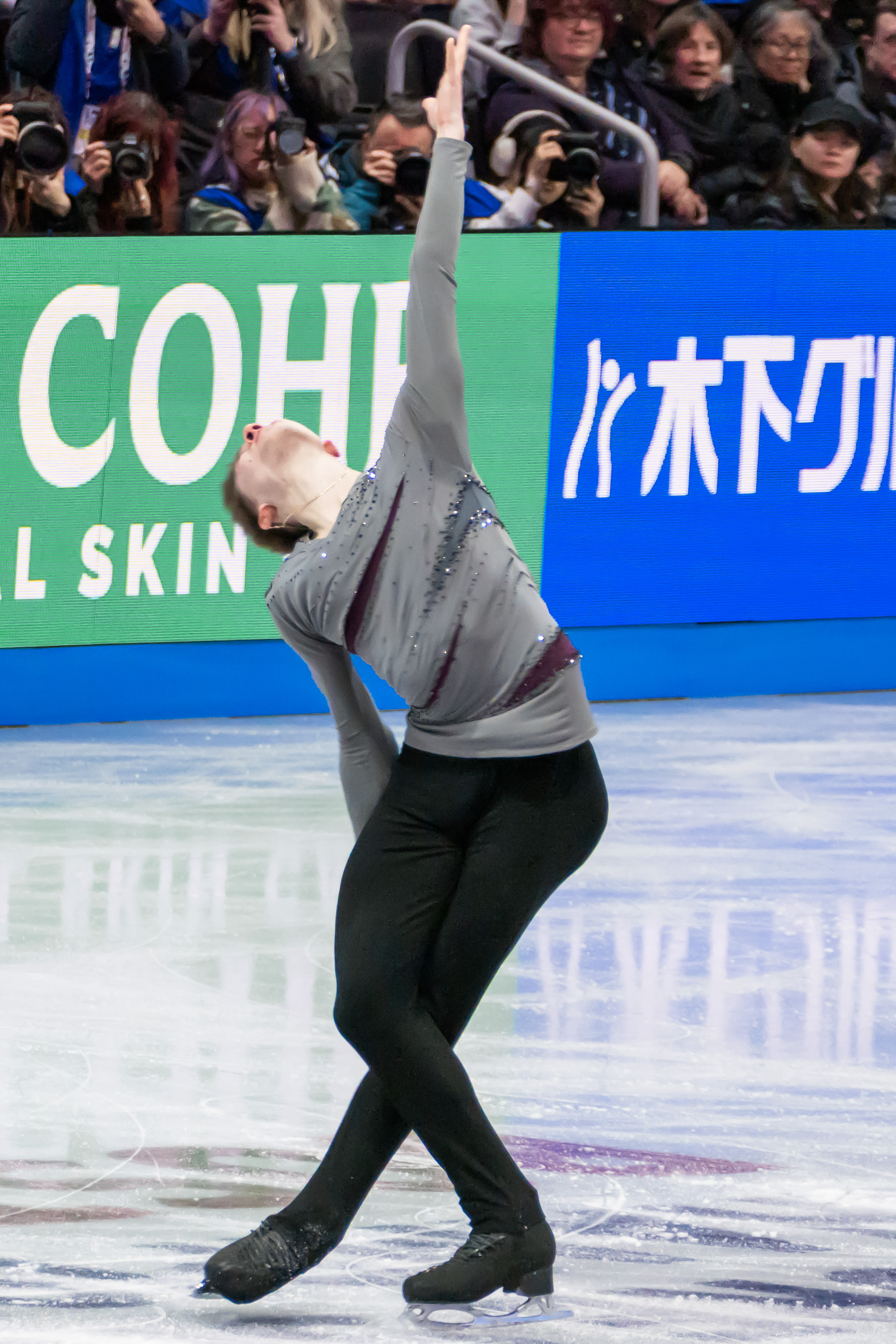
Sadovsky performs an upright spin during his short program at the 2025 World Championships

Sadovsky began the season by competing on the 2024–25 ISU Challenger Series, finishing sixth at the 2024 Cranberry Cup International and fifth at the 2024 Nebelhorn Trophy. Although assigned to compete at 2024 Skate Canada International, Sadovsky tweaked his back shortly before arriving at the competition, which made it painful to jump. Despite this, Sadovsky competed in the short program, finishing twelfth of the twelve skaters. He ultimately withdrew before the free skate competition due to this nagging injury. Sadovsky then went on to win the bronze medal at the 2024 Tallinn Trophy.

At the 2025 Canadian Championships, Sadovsky placed first in the short program, 4.17 points ahead of second-place Anthony Paradis, earning an 81.44 after an underrotation call and a fall on his triple Axel. He won the free skate with only two minor jump errors, winning his second national title.

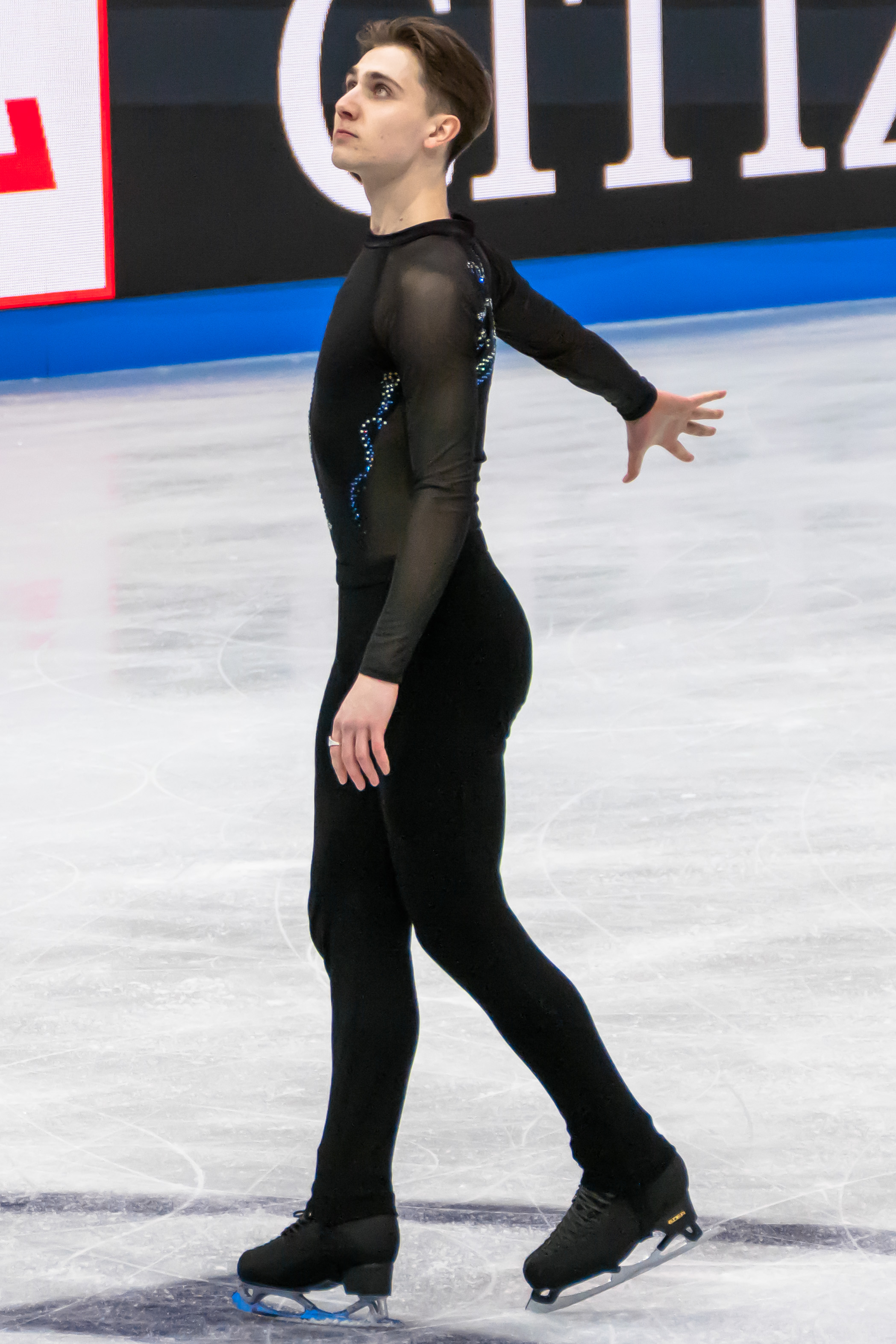
Sadovsky during his free skate at the 2025 World Championships

“It is very validating for me,” said Sadovsky. “I wish I can say public opinion doesn’t matter to me but at the same time, it does a little bit, no matter what."

Sadovsky was assigned to the 2025 Four Continents Championships in Seoul, South Korea, which he attended with Mathew Newham and Aleksa Rakic. After the short program, Sadovsky placed ninth with a 72.85 after landing his quadruple Salchow and the triple Lutz of his jump combination on the quarter, having a fall on his triple Axel. He received level fours on all spins and a level three step sequence. In the free skate, Sadovsky placed eleventh with a 141.05 after a solid free skate, the only significant errors being a stumble during his choreographic sequence and doubling his second quad. He finished tenth overall. The Four Continents Championships were used to select Canada's only entrant in the men's competition at the 2025 World Figure Skating Championships, and Sadovsky was given the quota.

At the 2025 World Championships in Boston, Massachusetts, United States, Sadovsky delivered a strong short program, only putting a hand down on the triple Lutz of his jump combination, for a fifteenth-place score of 80.25. In the free skate, Sadovsky skated a near-flawless routine, for a thirteenth-place season's best score of 160.13. This was Sadovsky's first time scoring in the 160's since the 2022 World Championships. In an interview following the event, he shared, "I was super nervous for this event. Lots of expectations, mostly on my myself. I had expectations building up. After the short program, it felt like a huge weight lifted. I put my game face on. Deniss Vasiljevs skated before me and had a loud crowd and a standing ovation. Probably you can guess what he did - he had a good skate. I used that as fuel, as energy and the crowd really welcomed me. They were excited to watch and I was excited to perform. After having struggles the past couple of seasons, it was great to put together two good programs. I was definitely trying to aim a little bit higher in this event. Overall, I think this proves that the training has been strong, and lots of improvements over the last couple of years handling pressure."

Sadovsky finished his season in April at the 2025 World Team Trophy in Tokyo, Japan. He placed eighth in the individual men's event and Team Canada finished in fifth place overall. After the free skate, Sadovsky expressed disappointment with his first quadruple Salchow but stated he was pleased with his recovery on the second attempt.

=== 2025–26 season ===
Sadovsky started the season in August by winning the gold medal at the 2025 CS Cranberry Cup International. This marked Sadovsky’s first international senior gold medal. He subsequently finished fifth at the 2025 CS Nebelhorn Trophy.

Going on to compete on the 2025–26 Grand Prix series, Sadovsky finished seventh at 2025 Skate Canada International and fourth at 2025 Finlandia Trophy.

In January, he competed at the 2026 Canadian Championships, winning the silver medal behind Stephen Gogolev.

== Programs ==
Season	Short program	Free skate	Exhibition	Ref.
2012–13	Live and Let Die Performed by David Garrett; Tomorrow Never Dies By David Arnold	Heart of a King From The Man in the Iron Mask By Nick Glennie-Smith	—N/a	
2013–14	Live and Let Die Performed by David Garrett; Tomorrow Never Dies By David Arnold	Les Misérables By Claude-Michel Schönberg Choreo. by Mark Pillay	—N/a	
2014–15	The Prophet By Gary Moore Choreo. by Grzegorz Filipowski	Les Misérables By Claude-Michel Schönberg Choreo. by Mark Pillay	Stairway to Heaven By Led Zeppelin	
2015–16	The Prophet By Gary Moore Choreo. by Grzegorz Filipowski	"Hanging" From Plunkett & Macleane By Craig Armstrong; "Kissing You" From Romeo + Juliet By Des'ree; "Escape" From Plunkett & Macleane By Craig Armstrong Choreo. by Mark Pillay	—N/a	
2016–17	Exogenesis: Symphony Part 3: Redemption By Muse Choreo. by David Wilson	"Hanging" From Plunkett & Macleane By Craig Armstrong; "Kissing You" From Romeo + Juliet By Des'ree; "Escape" From Plunkett & Macleane By Craig Armstrong Choreo. by Mark Pillay	—N/a	
2017–18	The Vampire Masquerade By Peter Gundry Choreo. by Carol Lane & Juris Razgulajevs	Les Misérables By Claude-Michel Schönberg Choreo. by Mark Pillay	—N/a	
2017–18	The Vampire Masquerade By Peter Gundry Choreo. by Carol Lane & Juris Razgulajevs	Sword Art Online By Yuki Kajiura Choreo. by David Wilson	—N/a	
2018–19	"Fly Me to the Moon" By Chris Mann Choreo. by David Wilson	Schindler's List By John Williams; Prelude in C-sharp minor (Bells of Moscow) By Sergei Rachmaninoff Choreo. by Mark Pillay	—N/a	
2019–20	"Fly Me to the Moon" By Chris Mann Choreo. by David Wilson	Schindler's List By John Williams; Prelude in C-sharp minor (Bells of Moscow) By Sergei Rachmaninoff Choreo. by Mark Pillay	"Fix You" By Coldplay Choreo. by Mark Pillay	
2020–21	Exogenesis: Symphony Part 3: Redemption	Chasing Cars By Snow Patrol Arranged by Maxime Rodriguez Choreo. by Mark Pillay	I Won't Give Up By Jason Mraz	
2021–22	Breathe for Me By Unsecret & Lonas Choreo. by Mark Pillay	Chasing Cars By Snow Patrol Arranged by Maxime Rodriguez Choreo. by Mark Pillay	Boy with Luv By BTS, feat. Halsey Choreo. by David Wilson	
2021–22	Exogenesis: Symphony Part 3: Redemption	Chasing Cars By Snow Patrol Arranged by Maxime Rodriguez Choreo. by Mark Pillay	Boy with Luv By BTS, feat. Halsey Choreo. by David Wilson	
2022–23	"Cold" By Chris Stapleton Choreo. by David Wilson	Fix You	Boy with Luv By BTS, feat. Halsey Choreo. by David Wilson	
2022–23	"Cold" By Chris Stapleton Choreo. by David Wilson	Chasing Cars	Boy with Luv By BTS, feat. Halsey Choreo. by David Wilson	
2022–23	"Cold" By Chris Stapleton Choreo. by David Wilson	"Angels" By Robbie Williams Arranged by Maxime Rodriguez Choreo. by Mark Pillay	Boy with Luv By BTS, feat. Halsey Choreo. by David Wilson	
2023–24	"Unconscious" By Charlie Winston Choreo. by Marie-France Dubreuil & Samuel Chouinard	Nureyev: 1. Immortal, Universal; 2. Politics; 3. Two By Alex Baranowski Choreo. by Mark Pillay	Boy with Luv By BTS, feat. Halsey Choreo. by David Wilson	
2024–25	"Unconscious" By Charlie Winston Choreo. by Marie-France Dubreuil & Samuel Chouinard	Interstellar By Hans Zimmer & Dmitrii Koshelev Choreo. by Mark Pillay	—N/a	
2025–26	Cold	"Clair de lune / Photograph" By Claude Debussy & Cody Fry Arranged by Maxime Rodriguez Choreo. by Mark Pillay	Standing Next to You By Jung Kook Choreo. by Roman Sadovsky	

== Competitive highlights ==
- GP – Event of the ISU Grand Prix Series
- JGP – Event of the ISU Junior Grand Prix Series
- CS – Event of the ISU Challenger Series
- C – Event cancelled
- WD – Withdrew from competition
- TBD – Assigned
- Medals at team events are awarded for the team results only. Individual placements at team events are listed in parentheses.

Competition placements at senior level
Season	2016–17	2017–18	2018–19	2019–20	2020–21	2021–22	2022–23	2023–24	2024–25	2025-26
Winter Olympics						29th				
Winter Olympics (Team event)						4th				
World Championships						12th		19th	14th	
Four Continents Championships				16th				10th	10th	9th
Canadian Championships	9th	7th	7th	1st	C	2nd	8th	6th	1st	2nd
World Team Trophy					6th (10th)				5th (8th)	
GP Finland										4th
GP NHK Trophy				3rd						
GP Rostelecom Cup						4th				
GP Skate America		10th					5th			
GP Skate Canada			12th	10th	C	12th			WD	7th
GP Wilson Trophy							6th			
CS Alpen Trophy			2nd							
CS Autumn Classic			3rd							
CS Cranberry Cup									6th	1st
CS Finlandia Trophy		10th		3rd	C					
CS Golden Spin of Zagreb	7th									
CS Nebelhorn Trophy						8th	3rd		5th	5th
CS Tallinn Trophy									3rd	
Skate Canada Challenge					1st				3rd	

Competition placements at junior level
Season	2012–13	2013–14	2014–15	2015–16	2016–17
Winter Youth Olympics				4th	
World Junior Championships		13th	14th		17th
Junior Grand Prix Final			5th	6th	
Canadian Championships (Senior)		8th	4th	9th	9th
JGP Belarus		8th			
JGP Czech Republic			1st		
JGP Estonia					2nd
JGP Germany			4th		
JGP Japan					5th
JGP Latvia		14th			
JGP Poland				3rd	
JGP Slovakia				1st	
JGP Slovenia	10th				
JGP United States	3rd				

== Detailed results ==
ISU personal best scores in the +5/-5 GOE System
Segment	Type	Score	Event
Total	TSS	253.80	2021 Rostelecom Cup
Short program	TSS	89.61	2021 World Team Trophy
Short program	TES	48.56	2021 World Team Trophy
Short program	PCS	42.40	2022 MK John Wilson Trophy
Free skating	TSS	169.21	2021 Rostelecom Cup
Free skating	TES	88.55	2025 CS Cranberry Cup International
Free skating	PCS	83.98	2021 Rostelecom Cup

ISU personal best scores in the +3/-3 GOE System
Segment	Type	Score	Event
Total	TSS	221.21	2016 JGP Estonia
Short program	TSS	76.27	2017 World Junior Championships
Short program	TES	41.72	2017 World Junior Championships
Short program	PCS	36.35	2016 CS Golden Spin of Zagreb
Free skating	TSS	149.25	2016 JGP Estonia
Free skating	TES	79.19	2016 JGP Estonia
Free skating	PCS	75.00	2016 CS Golden Spin of Zagreb

=== Senior level ===
- Medals at team events are awarded for the team results only. Individual placements at team events are listed in parentheses.

Results in the 2013–14 season
Date	Event	SP		FS		Total	
Date	Event	P	Score	P	Score	P	Score
Jan 9–15, 2014	(Canada) 2014 Canadian Championships	8	68.59	6	143.84	8	212.43

Results in the 2014–15 season
Date	Event	SP		FS		Total	
Date	Event	P	Score	P	Score	P	Score
Jan 19–25, 2015	(Canada) 2015 Canadian Championships	3	73.46	6	137.30	4	210.76

Results in the 2015–16 season
Date	Event	SP		FS		Total	
Date	Event	P	Score	P	Score	P	Score
Jan 18–24, 2016	(Canada) 2016 Canadian Championships	9	64.17	8	140.42	9	204.59

Results in the 2016–17 season
Date	Event	SP		FS		Total	
Date	Event	P	Score	P	Score	P	Score
Dec 7–10, 2016	(Croatia) 2016 CS Golden Spin of Zagreb	6	74.66	8	143.28	7	217.94
Jan 16–22, 2017	(Canada) 2017 Canadian Championships	7	72.38	10	130.58	9	202.96

Results in the 2017–18 season
Date	Event	SP		FS		Total	
Date	Event	P	Score	P	Score	P	Score
Oct 6–8, 2017	(Finland) 2017 CS Finlandia Trophy	12	59.19	9	134.98	10	194.17
Nov 24–26, 2017	(United States) 2017 Skate America	9	70.85	10	129.25	10	200.10
Jan 8–14, 2018	(Canada) 2018 Canadian Championships	7	78.72	8	154.95	7	233.67

Results in the 2018–19 season
Date	Event	SP		FS		Total	
Date	Event	P	Score	P	Score	P	Score
Sep 20–22, 2018	(Canada) 2018 CS Autumn Classic International	4	78.14	4	155.72	3	233.86
Oct 26–28, 2018	2018 Skate Canada International	12	67.72	8	142.88	12	210.60
Nov 11–18, 2018	(Austria) 2018 CS Alpen Trophy	2	77.91	5	127.04	2	204.95
Jan 14–20, 2019	(Canada) 2019 Canadian Championships	5	82.10	7	136.61	7	218.71

Results in the 2019–20 season
Date	Event	SP		FS		Total	
Date	Event	P	Score	P	Score	P	Score
Oct 11–13, 2019	(Finland) 2019 CS Finlandia Trophy	3	86.34	4	135.89	3	222.23
Oct 25–27, 2019	2019 Skate Canada International	11	65.29	8	139.06	10	204.35
Nov 22–24, 2019	(Japan) 2019 NHK Trophy	4	78.51	2	168.99	3	247.50
Jan 13–19, 2020	(Canada) 2020 Canadian Championships	3	85.02	1	175.55	1	260.57
Feb 4–9, 2020	(South Korea) 2020 Four Continents Championships	17	65.87	15	134.63	16	200.50

Results in the 2020–21 season
Date	Event	SP		FS		Total	
Date	Event	P	Score	P	Score	P	Score
Jan 8–17, 2021	2021 Skate Canada Challenge	1	94.43	1	167.58	1	262.01
Apr 15–18, 2021	(Japan) 2021 World Team Trophy	8	89.61	10	134.80	6 (10)	224.41

Results in the 2021–22 season
Date	Event	SP		FS		Total	
Date	Event	P	Score	P	Score	P	Score
Sep 22–25, 2021	(Germany) 2021 CS Nebelhorn Trophy	8	76.10	8	131.52	8	207.62
Oct 29–31, 2021	2021 Skate Canada International	10	72.94	11	144.79	12	217.73
Nov 26–28, 2021	(Russia) 2021 Rostelecom Cup	3	84.59	4	169.21	4	253.80
Jan 6–12, 2022	(Canada) 2022 Canadian Championships	4	77.17	2	170.43	2	247.60
Feb 4–7, 2022	(China) 2022 Winter Olympics (Team event)	8	71.06	5	122.60	4	—N/a
Feb 8–10, 2022	(China) 2022 Winter Olympics	29	62.77	—N/a	—N/a	29	62.77
Mar 21–27, 2022	(France) 2022 World Championships	18	80.54	9	164.82	12	245.36

Results in the 2022–23 season
Date	Event	SP		FS		Total	
Date	Event	P	Score	P	Score	P	Score
Sep 21–24, 2022	(Germany) 2022 CS Nebelhorn Trophy	1	89.57	5	133.17	3	222.74
Oct 21–23, 2022	(United States) 2022 Skate America	5	78.15	7	147.26	5	225.41
Nov 11–13, 2022	(United Kingdom) 2022 MK John Wilson Trophy	1	89.49	8	129.86	6	219.35
Jan 9–15, 2023	(Canada) 2023 Canadian Championships	13	61.48	5	145.38	8	206.86

Results in the 2023–24 season
Date	Event	SP		FS		Total	
Date	Event	P	Score	P	Score	P	Score
Jan 7–14, 2024	(Canada) 2024 Canadian Championships	7	68.29	4	136.65	6	204.94
Jan 30 – Feb 4, 2024	(China) 2024 Four Continents Championships	11	72.44	10	145.39	10	217.83
Mar 18–24, 2024	(Canada) 2024 World Championships	11	84.28	22	137.29	19	221.57

Results in the 2024–25 season
Date	Event	SP		FS		Total	
Date	Event	P	Score	P	Score	P	Score
Aug 8–11, 2024	(United States) 2024 CS Cranberry Cup International	6	80.50	5	144.20	6	224.70
Sep 19–21, 2024	(Germany) 2024 CS Nebelhorn Trophy	8	71.99	4	153.25	5	225.24
Oct 25–27, 2024	2024 Skate Canada International	12	63.37	—N/a	—N/a	–	WD
Nov 11–17, 2024	(Estonia) 2024 CS Tallinn Trophy	9	68.70	3	143.45	3	212.15
Jan 14–19, 2025	(Canada) 2025 Canadian Championships	1	81.44	1	158.91	1	240.35
Feb 19–23, 2025	(South Korea) 2025 Four Continents Championships	9	72.85	11	141.05	10	213.90
Mar 24-30, 2025	(United States) 2025 World Championships	15	80.25	13	160.13	14	240.38
Apr 17–20, 2025	(Japan) 2025 World Team Trophy	9	84.75	9	153.34	5 (8)	238.09

Results in the 2025–26 season
Date	Event	SP		FS		Total	
Date	Event	P	Score	P	Score	P	Score
Aug 7–10, 2025	(United States) 2025 CS Cranberry Cup International	5	74.76	1	168.47	1	243.23
Sep 25–27, 2025	(Germany) 2025 CS Nebelhorn Trophy	5	78.44	2	154.95	5	233.39
Oct 31 – Nov 2, 2025	2025 Skate Canada International	10	81.08	6	155.65	7	236.73
Nov 21–22, 2025	(Finland) 2025 Finlandia Trophy	6	82.91	4	160.38	4	243.29
Jan 6–11, 2026	(Canada) 2026 Canadian Championships	4	81.79	2	173.31	2	255.10
Jan 21-25, 2026	(China) 2026 Four Continents Championships	9	79.66	9	153.55	9	233.51

=== Junior level ===
Results in the 2012–13 season
Date	Event	SP		FS		Total	
Date	Event	P	Score	P	Score	P	Score
Aug 29 – Sep 1, 2012	2012 JGP United States	8	50.91	3	107.86	3	158.77
Sep 26–29, 2012	2012 JGP Slovenia	9	51.00	9	102.41	10	153.41

Results in the 2013–14 season
Date	Event	SP		FS		Total	
Date	Event	P	Score	P	Score	P	Score
Aug 28–31, 2013	2013 JGP Latvia	16	51.10	14	95.79	14	146.89
Sep 25–28, 2013	2013 JGP Belarus	10	50.40	8	96.48	8	146.88
Mar 10–16, 2014	(Bulgaria) 2014 World Junior Championships	14	60.79	12	117.65	13	178.44

Results in the 2014–15 season
Date	Event	SP		FS		Total	
Date	Event	P	Score	P	Score	P	Score
Sep 3–6, 2014	2014 JGP Czech Republic	1	67.51	3	124.57	1	192.08
Oct 1–4, 2014	2014 JGP Germany	8	59.90	2	132.54	4	192.44
Dec 11–14, 2014	(Spain) 2014–15 Junior Grand Prix Final	6	56.98	4	128.49	5	185.47
Mar 2–8, 2015	(Estonia) 2015 World Junior Championships	13	66.36	17	111.63	14	177.99

Results in the 2015–16 season
Date	Event	SP		FS		Total	
Date	Event	P	Score	P	Score	P	Score
Aug 19–23, 2015	2015 JGP Slovakia	1	68.49	1	135.23	1	203.72
Sep 23–26, 2015	2015 JGP Poland	2	71.13	5	127.25	3	198.38
Dec 10–13, 2015	(Spain) 2015–16 Junior Grand Prix Final	6	59.37	6	109.03	6	168.40
Feb 12–21, 2016	(Norway) 2016 Winter Youth Olympics	2	72.61	4	133.08	4	205.69

Results in the 2016–17 season
Date	Event	SP		FS		Total	
Date	Event	P	Score	P	Score	P	Score
Sep 8–11, 2016	2016 JGP Japan	5	67.94	4	143.61	5	211.55
Sep 28 – Oct 2, 2016	2016 JGP Estonia	3	71.96	2	149.25	2	221.21
Mar 15–19, 2017	(Taiwan) 2017 World Junior Championships	9	76.27	23	110.26	17	186.53
