= Figure skating at the 2022 Winter Olympics – Men's singles =

Men's singles skating at the XXIV Olympic Winter Games
- Venue: Capital Indoor Stadium; Beijing, China
- Dates: 8 and 10 February 2022
- Competitors: 29 from 20 nations
- Winning score: 332.60 points

Medalists
1st place, gold medalist(s)		Nathan Chen	United States
2nd place, silver medalist(s)		Yuma Kagiyama	Japan
3rd place, bronze medalist(s)		Shoma Uno	Japan

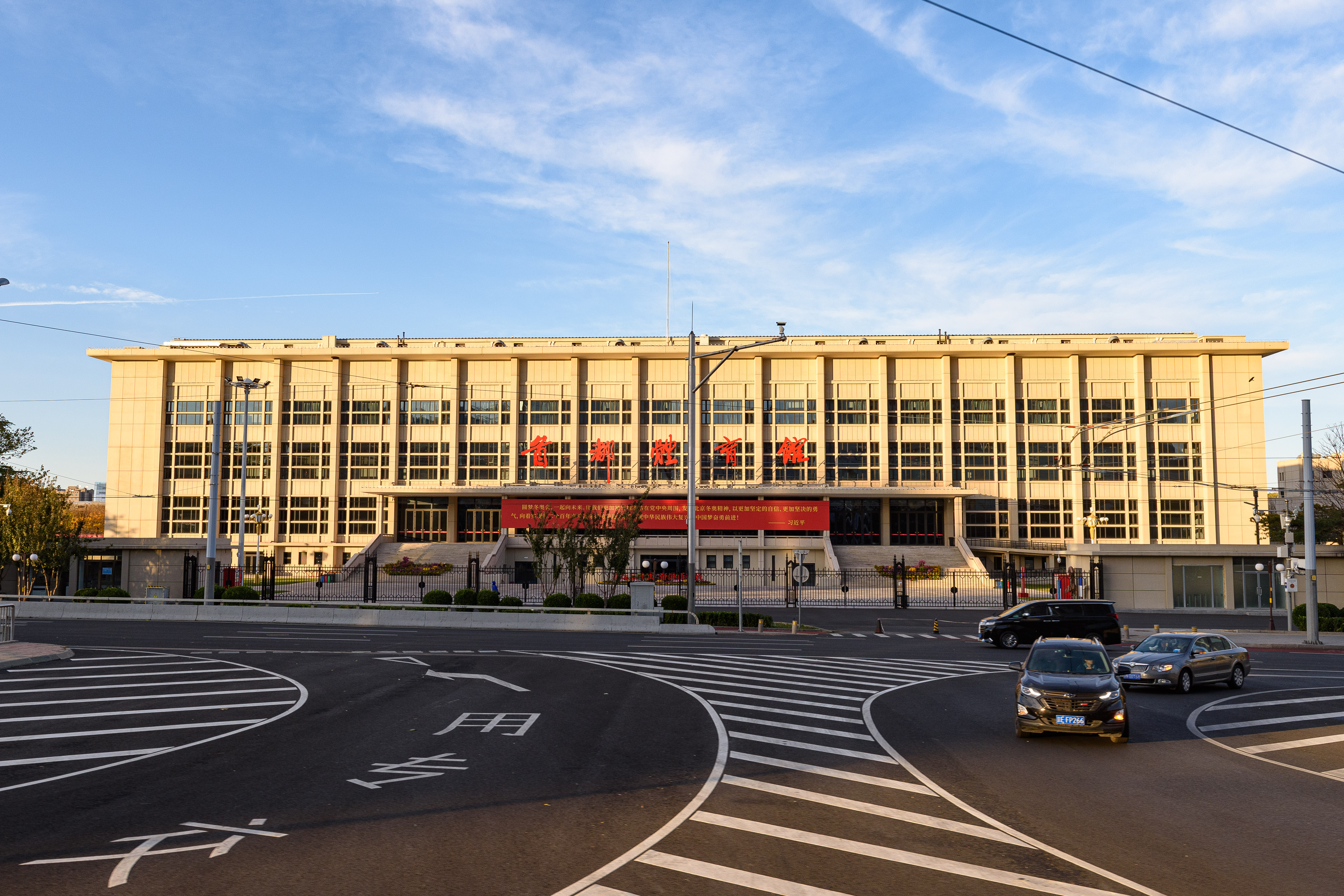
The figure skating events at the 2022 Winter Olympics were held at the Capital Indoor Stadium in Beijing, China.

The men's singles figure skating competition at the 2022 Winter Olympics was held on 8 and 10 February 2002 at the Capital Indoor Stadium in Beijing, China, and featured 29 skaters from 20 nations. Nathan Chen of the United States won the gold medal, while Yuma Kagiyama and Shoma Uno, both of Japan, won the silver and bronze medals, respectively. In addition to setting a new world record score in the short program, Chen found redemption after performing below expectations at the 2018 Winter Olympics, where he had been predicted to win the gold medal.

== Background ==
In 2016, an independent report commissioned by the World Anti-Doping Agency (WADA) confirmed allegations that the Russian Olympic team had been involved in a state-sponsored doping program from at least late 2011 through February 2014, when Russia hosted the Winter Olympics in Sochi. On 9 December 2019, the WADA banned Russia from all international competitions after it found that data provided by the Russian Anti-Doping Agency had been manipulated by Russian authorities in order to protect athletes involved in its doping scheme. Under a ruling by the Court of Arbitration for Sport in December 2020, Russian athletes could not use the Russian flag or anthem in international competition and had to compete as "Neutral Athletes" or a "Neutral Team" at any world championships for the next two years. On 19 February 2021, it was announced that Russian athletes would compete under the name of the Russian Olympic Committee (ROC) at the 2020 Summer Olympics and 2022 Winter Olympics.

The men's singles event was one of five figure skating competitions contested at the 2022 Winter Olympics in Beijing, China. It was held at the Capital Indoor Stadium over two days: the short program took place on 8 February and the free skating took place on 10 February. The competition featured 29 skaters representing 20 nations. Nathan Chen entered the Olympics favored to win the gold medal. After what he called a "disastrous" performance at the 2018 Winter Olympics, Chen had gone on to win three World Championship titles and four U.S. Championship titles, bringing his record to six consecutive national titles. Chen's greatest contenders were expected to be Yuzuru Hanyu, Yuma Kagiyama, and Shoma Uno, all of Japan. Hanyu, who entered the Olympics as a two-time reigning Olympic champion, had missed most of the season while recovering from injury, his only competition this season being the 2022 Japanese national championships. Keegan Messing of Canada, who had been scheduled to compete in the team event, was initially denied entry to China after a positive COVID-19 test. He was required to provide four negative COVID-19 tests, two each 24 hours apart, before he would be allowed to enter China. That last test result was received on 4 February. Messing eventually arrived in China in time to compete in the men's individual event.

The 2022 Winter Olympics took place over two years into the COVID-19 pandemic and most events were closed to the public, with only selected events open to invited guests at a reduced capacity. To minimize the risk of virus transmission, China implemented strict health and safety measures, including a closed-loop system that segregated participants from the general public, frequent testing, and quarantine protocols for participants. Amid increasing lockdowns across China and the first detected case of the Omicron variant in Beijing, ticket sales to the general public were cancelled and it was announced that limited numbers of spectators would be admitted by invitation only.

== Qualification ==
Twenty-three quota spots in the men's event were awarded based on the results at the 2021 World Figure Skating Championships. Only twenty-three spots out of the possible twenty-four were awarded, because while Yan Han and Jin Boyang of China both qualified for the free skate, they only earned enough points to qualify for one Olympic entry. Therefore, the extra quota spot was made available at the 2021 Nebelhorn Trophy along with the other six slots originally allocated.

Qualifying nations in men's singles
Event	Skaters per NOC	Qualifying NOCs	Total skaters
2021 World Championships	3	Japan	23
2021 World Championships	2	United States; ROC; Italy	23
2021 World Championships	1	Canada; France; South Korea; China; Georgia; Switzerland; Estonia; Belarus; Latvia; Czech Republic; Mexico; Ukraine; Sweden; Israel	23
2021 Nebelhorn Trophy	1	United States; France; ROC; South Korea; Azerbaijan; Australia; Canada	7
Total			30

== Required performance elements ==
Men performed their short programs on 8 February. Lasting 2 minutes 40 seconds (+/− 10 seconds), the short program had to include the following elements: one double or triple Axel; one triple or quadruple jump; one jump combination consisting of a double jump and a triple jump, two triple jumps, or a quadruple jump and a double jump or triple jump; one flying spin; one camel spin or sit spin with a change of foot; one spin combination with a change of foot; and a step sequence using the full ice surface.

The twenty-four highest-scoring skaters after the short program advanced to the free skating on 10 February. Lasting 4 minutes (+/− 10 seconds), the free skate had to include the following: seven jump elements, of which one had to be an Axel-type jump; three spins, of which one had to be a spin combination, one a flying spin, and one a spin with only one position; a step sequence; and a choreographic sequence.

== Judging ==
Skaters were judged according to the required technical elements of their program (such as jumps and spins), as well as the overall presentation of their program, based on five program components (skating skills, transitions, performance, composition, and musical interpretation). Each technical element in a figure skating performance was assigned a predetermined base point value and scored by a panel of nine judges on a scale from −5 to +5 based on the quality of its execution. Each Grade of Execution (GOE) from –5 to +5 was assigned a value as indicated on the Scale of Values. (Note: The International Skating Union had originally published a new Scale of Values for the 2020/21 season, but chose to cancel it, reverting back to the scale from the 2019/20 season.) For example, a triple Axel was worth a base value of 8.00 points, and a GOE of +3 was worth 2.40 points, so a triple Axel with a GOE of +3 earned 10.40 points. The judging panel's GOE for each element was determined by calculating the trimmed mean (the average after discarding the highest and lowest scores). The panel's scores for all elements were added together to generate a Total Elements Score. At the same time, the judges evaluated each performance based on the five aforementioned program components and assigned each a score from 0.25 to 10 in 0.25-point increments. The judging panel's final score for each program component was also determined by calculating the trimmed mean. Those scores were then multiplied by the factor shown on the chart below; the results were added together to generate a total Program Component Score.

Program component factoring
Discipline	Short program	Free skate
Men	1.00	2.00

Deductions were applied for certain violations, such as time infractions or falls. The Total Elements Score and Program Component Score were then added together, minus any deductions, to generate a final performance score for each skater.

== Results ==
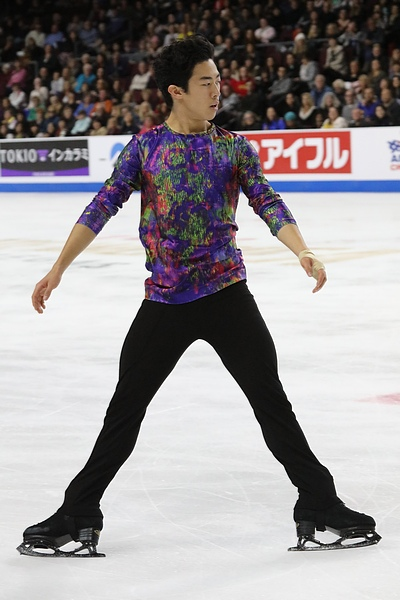
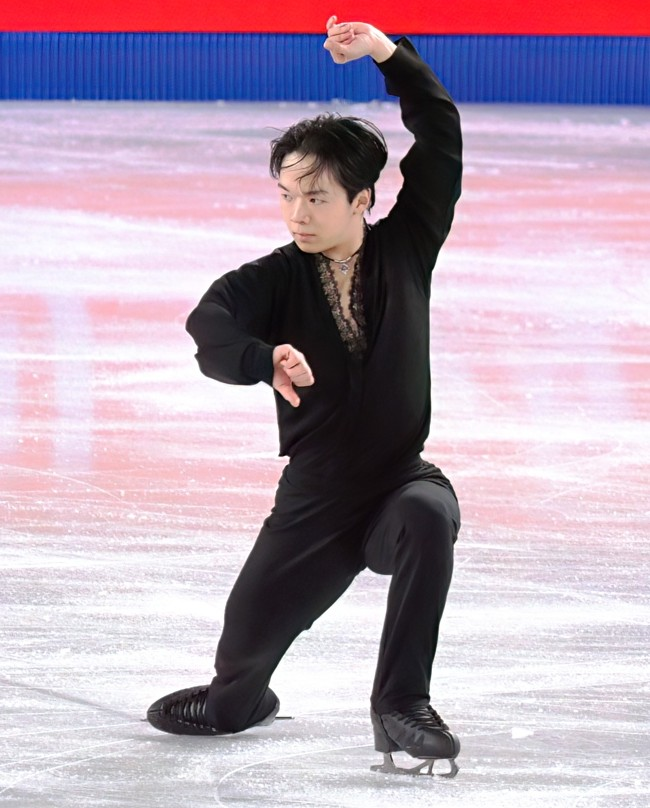
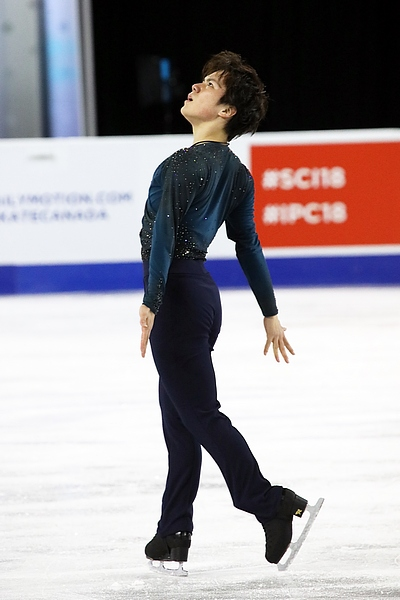
The gold, silver, and bronze medalists from the men's event at the 2022 Winter Olympics (from left to right):
Nathan Chen of the United States (gold), Yuma Kagiyama of Japan (silver), and Shoma Uno of Japan (bronze)

Code key

- TSS – Total Segment Score
- TES – Total Elements Score
- PCS – Program Component Score
- SS – Skating skills
- TR – Transitions
- PE – Performance
- CO – Composition
- IN – Interpretation of the music
- DED – Deductions

=== Short program ===
Vincent Zhou of the United States was forced to withdraw from the competition prior to the short program after testing positive for COVID-19.

The men's short program was held on 8 February. Nathan Chen of the United States, after what he called a "disastrous" performance at the 2018 Winter Olympics, set a new world record score in the short program with a dominant performance that including two quadruple jumps and a triple Axel. Yuma Kagiyama and Shoma Uno, both of Japan, finished in second and third places, respectively. Yuzuru Hanyu, two-time Olympic gold medalist from Japan, made an error on his opening quadruple Salchow, ultimately receiving zero points for the element. His score of 95.15 – his lowest short program score since 2019 – landed him in eighth place. "When I was about to go for the Salchow, there was a hole in the ice as I came around the curve, so I couldn't jump," Hanyu explained afterward. "Maybe... the ice had it in for me."

Men's short program results
Pl.	Skater	Nation	TSS	TES	PCS	SS	TR	PE	CO	IN	DED
1	Nathan Chen	United States	113.97	65.98	47.99	9.57	9.39	9.71	9.68	9.64	0.00
2	Yuma Kagiyama	Japan	108.12	60.91	47.21	9.50	9.25	9.54	9.46	9.46	0.00
3	Shoma Uno	Japan	105.90	59.05	46.85	9.43	9.21	9.36	9.39	9.46	0.00
4	Cha Jun-hwan	South Korea	99.51	54.30	45.21	8.96	8.93	9.07	9.14	9.11	0.00
5	Morisi Kvitelashvili	Georgia	97.98	55.69	42.29	8.54	8.32	8.54	8.46	8.43	0.00
6	Jason Brown	United States	97.24	49.95	47.29	9.29	9.39	9.54	9.50	9.57	0.00
7	Evgeni Semenenko	ROC	95.76	55.23	40.53	8.21	7.93	8.18	8.14	8.07	0.00
8	Yuzuru Hanyu	Japan	95.15	48.07	47.08	9.43	9.43	9.25	9.54	9.43	0.00
9	Keegan Messing	Canada	93.24	49.30	43.94	8.93	8.68	8.68	8.79	8.86	0.00
10	Kévin Aymoz	France	93.00	49.93	43.07	8.57	8.29	8.68	8.71	8.82	0.00
11	Jin Boyang	China	90.98	51.62	39.36	8.07	7.32	8.04	8.00	7.93	0.00
12	Daniel Grassl	Italy	90.64	48.70	41.94	8.29	8.29	8.36	8.54	8.46	0.00
13	Matteo Rizzo	Italy	88.63	46.71	41.92	8.43	8.21	8.39	8.43	8.46	0.00
14	Adam Siao Him Fa	France	86.74	47.28	40.46	8.21	7.79	8.14	8.14	8.18	1.00
15	Mark Kondratiuk	ROC	86.11	45.08	41.03	8.32	8.00	8.25	8.25	8.21	0.00
16	Deniss Vasiļjevs	Latvia	85.30	43.08	42.22	8.43	8.18	8.46	8.54	8.61	0.00
17	Brendan Kerry	Australia	84.79	45.93	38.86	7.82	7.50	7.93	7.79	7.82	0.00
18	Vladimir Litvintsev	Azerbaijan	84.15	47.14	37.01	7.43	7.11	7.50	7.43	7.54	0.00
19	Donovan Carrillo	Mexico	79.69	43.08	36.61	7.32	7.11	7.43	7.32	7.43	0.00
20	Nikolaj Majorov	Sweden	78.54	41.22	37.32	7.46	7.14	7.57	7.54	7.61	0.00
21	Konstantin Milyukov	Belarus	78.49	41.92	36.57	7.46	7.18	7.32	7.32	7.29	0.00
22	Ivan Shmuratko	Ukraine	78.11	41.08	37.03	7.46	7.21	7.50	7.43	7.43	0.00
23	Andrei Mozalev	ROC	77.05	36.76	41.29	8.36	8.18	8.11	8.39	8.25	1.00
24	Lukas Britschgi	Switzerland	76.16	39.76	36.40	7.39	7.07	7.36	7.29	7.29	0.00
25	Michal Březina	Czech Republic	75.19	36.69	39.50	8.04	7.71	7.75	8.04	7.96	1.00
26	Alexei Bychenko	Israel	68.01	33.02	35.99	7.39	6.96	7.18	7.32	7.14	1.00
27	Lee Si-hyeong	South Korea	65.69	30.75	35.94	7.36	7.04	7.11	7.29	7.14	1.00
28	Aleksandr Selevko	Estonia	65.29	28.79	36.50	7.36	7.00	7.21	7.50	7.43	0.00
29	Roman Sadovsky	Canada	62.77	24.99	37.78	7.71	7.39	7.36	7.68	7.64	0.00
WD	Vincent Zhou	United States	Withdrew from competition								

=== Free skating ===
The men's free skating was held on 10 February. Nathan Chen won the free skate overwhelmingly, successfully performing five quadruple jumps in the process, including a quadruple Lutz – at that point, the most difficult jump in figure skating – which received nearly perfect scores from the judges. In addition to his jumping prowess, Chen received the highest Program Component Scores, which measured skating skills, overall performance, and musicality. Yuma Kagiyama and Shoma Uno won the silver and bronze medals, respectively.

Yuzuru Hanyu, who had been in eighth place after the short program, attempted a quadruple Axel, which at that point had never been successfully performed in competition; however, he fell on it and later on a quadruple Salchow. Hanyu finished in third place in the free skate and fourth place overall. Chen praised Hanyu for having "progressed the sport in so many ways" upon seeing Hanyu attempt the quadruple Axel.

Men's free skate results
Pl.	Skater	Nation	TSS	TES	PCS	SS	TR	PE	CO	IN	DED
1	Nathan Chen	United States	218.63	121.41	97.22	9.71	9.54	9.79	9.71	9.86	0.00
2	Yuma Kagiyama	Japan	201.93	107.99	93.94	9.50	9.18	9.36	9.50	9.43	0.00
3	Yuzuru Hanyu	Japan	188.06	99.62	90.44	9.25	9.18	8.75	9.25	8.79	2.00
4	Daniel Grassl	Italy	187.43	103.35	84.08	8.39	8.18	8.54	8.50	8.43	0.00
5	Shoma Uno	Japan	187.10	96.24	91.86	9.32	9.07	9.04	9.29	9.21	1.00
6	Jason Brown	United States	184.00	87.66	96.34	9.46	9.50	9.75	9.64	9.82	0.00
7	Cha Jun-hwan	South Korea	182.87	93.59	90.28	9.07	8.96	8.93	9.11	9.07	1.00
8	Jin Boyang	China	179.45	97.23	82.22	8.43	7.79	8.50	8.18	8.21	0.00
9	Evgeni Semenenko	ROC	178.37	94.81	83.56	8.46	8.11	8.43	8.39	8.39	0.00
10	Keegan Messing	Canada	172.37	84.13	88.24	8.93	8.61	8.86	8.86	8.86	0.00
11	Morisi Kvitelashvili	Georgia	170.64	85.92	84.72	8.46	8.36	8.50	8.54	8.50	0.00
12	Deniss Vasiļjevs	Latvia	167.41	84.75	83.66	8.32	8.11	8.36	8.50	8.54	1.00
13	Adam Siao Him Fa	France	163.41	81.69	82.72	8.36	7.93	8.32	8.36	8.39	1.00
14	Mark Kondratiuk	ROC	162.71	80.15	83.56	8.50	8.14	8.21	8.50	8.43	1.00
15	Kévin Aymoz	France	161.80	76.60	86.20	8.68	8.46	8.57	8.68	8.71	1.00
16	Brendan Kerry	Australia	160.01	83.51	76.50	7.79	7.36	7.71	7.71	7.68	0.00
17	Matteo Rizzo	Italy	158.90	76.92	82.98	8.32	8.07	8.21	8.50	8.39	1.00
18	Andrei Mozalev	ROC	156.28	79.48	78.80	8.04	7.82	7.61	8.07	7.86	2.00
19	Vladimir Litvintsev	Azerbaijan	155.04	80.76	74.28	7.57	7.18	7.50	7.46	7.43	0.00
20	Konstantin Milyukov	Belarus	143.73	71.35	72.38	7.36	7.04	7.18	7.36	7.25	0.00
21	Nikolaj Majorov	Sweden	142.24	67.60	74.64	7.57	7.18	7.50	7.50	7.57	0.00
22	Donovan Carrillo	Mexico	138.44	66.56	72.88	7.32	7.04	7.29	7.36	7.43	1.00
23	Lukas Britschgi	Switzerland	136.42	64.72	71.70	7.32	6.96	7.07	7.29	7.21	0.00
24	Ivan Shmuratko	Ukraine	127.65	57.17	71.48	7.36	6.96	6.96	7.21	7.25	1.00

=== Overall ===
Men's results
Rank	Skater	Nation	Total	SP		FS	
1st place, gold medalist(s)	Nathan Chen	United States	332.60	1	113.97	1	218.63
2nd place, silver medalist(s)	Yuma Kagiyama	Japan	310.05	2	108.12	2	201.93
3rd place, bronze medalist(s)	Shoma Uno	Japan	293.00	3	105.90	5	187.10
4	Yuzuru Hanyu	Japan	283.21	8	95.15	3	188.06
5	Cha Jun-hwan	South Korea	282.38	4	99.51	7	182.87
6	Jason Brown	United States	281.24	6	97.24	6	184.00
7	Daniel Grassl	Italy	278.07	12	90.64	4	187.43
8	Evgeni Semenenko	ROC	274.13	7	95.76	9	178.37
9	Jin Boyang	China	270.43	11	90.98	8	179.45
10	Morisi Kvitelashvili	Georgia	268.62	5	97.98	11	170.64
11	Keegan Messing	Canada	265.61	9	93.24	10	172.37
12	Kévin Aymoz	France	254.80	10	93.00	15	161.80
13	Deniss Vasiļjevs	Latvia	252.71	16	85.30	12	167.41
14	Adam Siao Him Fa	France	250.15	14	86.74	13	163.41
15	Mark Kondratiuk	ROC	248.82	15	86.11	14	162.71
16	Matteo Rizzo	Italy	247.53	13	88.63	17	158.90
17	Brendan Kerry	Australia	244.80	17	84.79	16	160.01
18	Vladimir Litvintsev	Azerbaijan	239.19	18	84.15	19	155.04
19	Andrei Mozalev	ROC	233.33	23	77.05	18	156.28
20	Konstantin Milyukov	Belarus	222.22	21	78.49	20	143.73
21	Nikolaj Majorov	Sweden	220.78	20	78.54	21	142.24
22	Donovan Carrillo	Mexico	218.13	19	79.69	22	138.44
23	Lukas Britschgi	Switzerland	212.58	24	76.16	23	136.42
24	Ivan Shmuratko	Ukraine	205.76	22	78.11	24	127.65
25	Michal Březina	Czech Republic	75.19	25	75.19	Did not advance to free skate	
26	Alexei Bychenko	Israel	68.01	26	68.01	Did not advance to free skate	
27	Lee Si-hyeong	South Korea	65.69	27	65.69	Did not advance to free skate	
28	Aleksandr Selevko	Estonia	65.29	28	65.29	Did not advance to free skate	
29	Roman Sadovsky	Canada	62.77	29	62.77	Did not advance to free skate	

== Records ==
The following new record high score was set during this event.

Record high scores
Date	Team	Segment	Score	Ref.
8 February	(United States) Nathan Chen	Short program	113.97	

== Works cited ==
- "Special Regulations & Technical Rules – Single & Pair Skating and Ice Dance 2021". International Skating Union. Archived from the original on 4 April 2022.
