= 2021 CS Nebelhorn Trophy =

- Type: ISU Challenger Series
- Date: September 22 – 25
- Season: 2021–22
- Location: Oberstdorf, Germany
- Host: Deutsche Eislauf Union
- Venue: Eissportzentrum Oberstdorf

Champions
- Men's singles: (United States) Vincent Zhou
- Women's singles: (United States) Alysa Liu
- Pairs: (Germany) Minerva Fabienne Hase / Nolan Seegert
- Ice dance: (Finland) Juulia Turkkila / Matthias Versluis
- Previous: 2020 CS Nebelhorn Trophy
- Next: 2022 CS Nebelhorn Trophy
- Previous CS: 2021 CS Autumn Classic
- Next CS: 2021 CS Finlandia Trophy

The 2021 CS Nebelhorn Trophy was held on September 22–25, 2021 in Oberstdorf, Germany. It was part of the 2021–22 ISU Challenger Series. It was also the final qualifying event for the 2022 Winter Olympics. Medals were awarded in the disciplines of men's singles, women's singles, pair skating, and ice dance.

In December 2020, the International Skating Union designated Nebelhorn Trophy as the official figure skating qualification competition for the 2022 Winter Olympics. The 2009, 2013, and 2017 editions of the event served the same role for the 2010, 2014, and 2018 Winter Olympics, respectively.

== Entries ==
The International Skating Union published the list of entries on September 2, 2021. Names with an asterisk (*) denote skaters not competing for Olympic qualification.

Country	Men	Women	Pairs	Ice dance
Armenia	Slavik Hayrapetyan			Tina Garabedian / Simon Proulx-Sénécal
Australia	Brendan Kerry	Kailani Craine	Anastasia Golubeva / Hektor Giotopoulos Moore	Holly Harris / Jason Chan
Austria	Luc Maierhofer*; Maurizio Zandron	Sophia Schaller		
Azerbaijan	Vladimir Litvintsev			Ekaterina Kuznetsova / Oleksandr Kolosovskyi
Belarus		Viktoriia Safonova	Bogdana Lukashevich / Alexander Stepanov	Viktoria Semenjuk / Ilya Yukhimuk
Bosnia and Herzegovina				Ekaterina Mitrofanova / Vladislav Kasinskij
Brazil		Isadora Williams		
Bulgaria	Larry Loupolover			
Canada	Roman Sadovsky			
Chile		Yae-Mia Neira		
China			Wang Yuchen / Huang Yihang	
Chinese Taipei	Yeh Che Yu	Ting Tzu-Han		
Croatia	Jari Kessler		Lana Petranović / Antonio Souza-Kordeiru	
Cyprus		Emilea Zingas		
Czech Republic				Natálie Taschlerová / Filip Taschler
Denmark		Maia Sørensen		
Estonia		Gerli Liinamäe*		
Finland	Valtter Virtanen	Oona Ounasvuori*		Juulia Turkkila / Matthias Versluis
France	Adam Siao Him Fa	Léa Serna	Coline Keriven / Noël-Antoine Pierre	
Georgia			Karina Safina / Luka Berulava	Maria Kazakova / Georgy Reviya
Germany	Paul Fentz; Kai Jagoda*; Thomas Stoll*	Nathalie Weinzierl*	Minerva Fabienne Hase / Nolan Seegert*; Annika Hocke / Robert Kunkel*	Viktoriia Lopusova / Asaf Kazimov*; Lara Luft / Maximilian Pfisterer*; Katharina Müller / Tim Dieck*; Anne-Marie Wolf / Max Liebers*
Great Britain	Peter James Hallam		Zoe Jones / Christopher Boyadji	Sasha Fear / George Waddell
Greece		Dimitra Korri		
Hong Kong	Harrison Jon-Yen Wong	Joanna So		
Hungary	András Csernoch	Júlia Láng		Anna Yanovskaya / Ádám Lukács
Iceland		Aldís Kara Bergsdóttir		
India		Tara Prasad		
Ireland	Conor Stakelum			
Israel		Taylor Morris	Hailey Kops / Evgeni Krasnopolski	Shira Ichilov / Laurent Abecassis
Italy	Gabriele Frangipani*	Lara Naki Gutmann	Sara Conti / Niccolò Macii*	Carolina Portesi Peroni / Michael Chrastecky
Kazakhstan	Dias Jirenbayev	Bagdana Rakhishova		
Latvia		Anete Lāce		
Liechtenstein		Romana Kaiser		
Lithuania		Aleksandra Golovkina		
Mexico		Eugenia Garza		
Monaco	Davide Lewton Brain			
Netherlands			Daria Danilova / Michel Tsiba	Chelsea Verhaegh / Sherim van Geffen
New Zealand		Jocelyn Hong		Charlotte Lafond-Fournier / Richard Kang-in Kam
Philippines	Edrian Paul Celestino	Sofia Frank		
Poland	Kornel Witkowski	Ekaterina Kurakova	Anna Hernik / Michał Woźniak	
Romania		Julia Sauter		
Russia	Mark Kondratiuk			
Serbia		Antonina Dubinina		
Slovakia	Adam Hagara	Nicole Rajičová		Mária Sofia Pucherová / Nikita Lysak
Slovenia		Daša Grm		
South Africa	Matthew Samuels			
South Korea	Lee Si-hyeong			Yura Min / Daniel Eaton
Spain	Tomàs Llorenç Guarino Sabaté		Laura Barquero / Marco Zandron	
Sweden		Josefin Taljegård*	Greta Crafoord / John Crafoord	
Switzerland	Nicola Todeschini*	Alexia Paganini		
Thailand		Thita Lamsam		
Turkey	Burak Demirboğa*; Başar Oktar	Sinem Pekder		Yuliia Zhata / Berk Akalın
Ukraine		Anastasiia Shabotova	Sofiia Holichenko / Artem Darenskyi	
United States	Vincent Zhou	Alysa Liu		

=== Changes to preliminary assignments ===
Date	Discipline	Withdrew	Added	Reason/Other notes	Refs
September 5	Women	(Latvia) Angelīna Kučvaļska	(Latvia) Anete Lāce	Further consideration	
September 7	Men	(Turkey) Başar Oktar replaces (Turkey) Burak Demirboğa as the skater competing for Olympic qualification.			
September 13	Men	(Russia) Dmitri Aliev	(Russia) Mark Kondratiuk	Further consideration	
September 13	Women	(Czech Republic) Nikola Rychtaříková			
September 13	Ice dance	(Italy) Carolina Moscheni / Francesco Fioretti	(Italy) Carolina Portesi Peroni / Michael Chrastecky	Further consideration	
September 15	Men	N/A	(South Africa) Matthew Samuels		
September 17	Women	(France) Maïa Mazzara	(France) Léa Serna	Further consideration	
September 17	Women	(Greece) Alexandra Mintsidou	(Greece) Dimitra Korri	Further consideration	
September 17	Pairs	(France) Cléo Hamon / Denys Strekalin	(France) Coline Keriven / Noël-Antoine Pierre	Health reasons (Hamon)	
September 20	Women	(Armenia) Anastasiya Galustyan			
September 20	Pairs	(Italy) Nicole Della Monica / Matteo Guarise	(Italy) Sara Conti / Niccolò Macii		

== Results ==
=== Men ===
Rank	Name	Nation	Total points	SP		FS		Olympic Qualification
1	Vincent Zhou	United States	284.23	1	97.35	1	186.88	Qualified
2	Adam Siao Him Fa	France	243.78	2	89.23	3	154.55	Qualified
3	Mark Kondratiuk	Russia	241.06	5	81.48	2	159.58	Qualified
4	Gabriele Frangipani	Italy	229.39	4	83.11	6	146.28	–
5	Lee Si-hyeong	South Korea	229.14	7	79.95	4	149.19	Qualified
6	Vladimir Litvintsev	Azerbaijan	228.65	6	80.54	5	148.11	Qualified
7	Brendan Kerry	Australia	218.95	3	85.89	7	133.06	Qualified
8	Roman Sadovsky	Canada	207.62	8	76.10	8	131.52	Qualified
9	Burak Demirboğa	Turkey	203.28	10	73.56	10	129.72	–
10	Başar Oktar	Turkey	203.22	9	74.77	13	128.45	Reserve 1
11	Slavik Hayrapetyan	Armenia	199.47	12	69.89	12	129.58	Reserve 2
12	Peter James Hallam	Great Britain	196.39	15	66.77	11	129.62	Reserve 3
13	Paul Fentz	Germany	194.70	11	73.32	15	121.38	Reserve 4
14	Maurizio Zandron	Austria	192.73	17	62.85	9	129.88	
15	Jari Kessler	Croatia	190.39	13	69.28	16	121.11	
16	Nicola Todeschini	Switzerland	185.09	14	66.79	17	118.30	
17	Tomàs Llorenç Guarino Sabaté	Spain	187.72	22	59.45	14	128.27	
18	Edrian Paul Celestino	Philippines	176.10	16	64.32	18	111.78	
19	Davide Lewton Brain	Monaco	170.13	18	62.38	21	107.75	
20	Kai Jagoda	Germany	169.23	20	61.48	20	107.75	
21	András Csernoch	Hungary	164.41	21	59.52	24	104.89	
22	Larry Loupolover	Bulgaria	163.80	19	61.82	27	101.98	
23	Adam Hagara	Slovakia	162.41	25	54.20	19	108.21	
24	Valtter Virtanen	Finland	161.02	24	55.22	22	105.80	
25	Matthew Samuels	South Africa	160.15	23	56.09	25	104.06	
26	Harrison Jon-Yen Wong	Hong Kong	158.49	26	53.55	23	104.94	
27	Dias Jirenbayev	Kazakhstan	156.29	28	52.81	26	103.48	
28	Thomas Stoll	Germany	153.77	29	52.32	28	101.45	
29	Conor Stakelum	Ireland	140.67	27	53.01	30	87.66	
30	Yeh Che Yu	Chinese Taipei	137.13	30	46.91	29	90.22	
WD	Luc Maierhofer	Austria	withdrew	withdrew from competition				
WD	Kornel Witkowski	Poland	withdrew	withdrew from competition				

=== Women ===
Rank	Name	Nation	Total points	SP		FS		Olympic Qualification
1	Alysa Liu	United States	207.40	1	70.86	1	136.54	Qualified
2	Ekaterina Kurakova	Poland	193.58	6	61.04	2	132.54	Qualified
3	Viktoriia Safonova	Belarus	190.29	3	62.02	3	128.27	Qualified
4	Alexia Paganini	Switzerland	180.48	2	65.65	5	114.83	Qualified
5	Anastasiia Shabotova	Ukraine	177.70	5	61.49	4	116.21	Qualified
6	Josefin Taljegård	Sweden	166.05	9	54.96	6	111.09	–
7	Kailani Craine	Australia	165.35	4	61.62	10	103.73	Qualified
8	Lara Naki Gutmann	Italy	164.60	7	57.16	7	107.44	Reserve 1
9	Emilea Zingas	Cyprus	158.16	11	52.90	9	105.26	Reserve 2
10	Ting Tzu-Han	Chinese Taipei	157.21	13	51.33	8	105.88	Reserve 3
11	Oona Ounasvuori	Finland	155.67	12	51.94	11	103.73	–
12	Daša Grm	Slovenia	148.79	15	50.19	13	98.60	Reserve 4
13	Taylor Morris	Israel	148.34	10	53.36	16	94.98	
14	Léa Serna	France	146.52	14	50.93	15	95.59	
15	Jocelyn Hong	New Zealand	146.41	17	49.13	14	97.28	
16	Júlia Láng	Hungary	145.64	24	45.22	12	100.42	
17	Anete Lāce	Latvia	145.17	8	54.96	19	90.21	
18	Nicole Rajičová	Slovakia	143.00	16	50.00	17	93.00	
19	Sophia Schaller	Austria	138.75	18	48.92	20	89.83	
20	Julia Sauter	Romania	136.49	20	48.79	21	87.70	
21	Joanna So	Hong Kong	135.78	19	48.79	23	86.99	
22	Eugenia Garza	Mexico	135.29	21	47.84	22	87.45	
23	Gerli Liinamäe	Estonia	133.83	28	43.44	18	90.39	
24	Sofia Frank	Philippines	128.78	22	47.65	29	81.13	
25	Nathalie Weinzierl	Germany	127.99	25	44.62	26	83.37	
26	Antonina Dubinina	Serbia	127.97	26	44.09	25	83.88	
27	Maia Sørensen	Denmark	127.32	23	46.69	30	80.63	
28	Aleksandra Golovkina	Lithuania	125.33	27	43.95	28	81.38	
29	Yae-Mia Neira	Chile	122.34	29	41.86	31	80.48	
30	Tara Prasad	India	122.27	34	37.51	24	84.76	
31	Sinem Pekder	Turkey	122.12	30	40.01	27	82.11	
32	Aldís Kara Bergsdóttir	Iceland	118.09	31	39.92	32	78.17	
33	Bagdana Rakhishova	Kazakhstan	104.18	33	38.22	33	65.96	
34	Romana Kaiser	Liechtenstein	92.39	37	31.38	34	61.01	
35	Dimitra Korri	Greece	91.89	36	32.89	35	59.00	
36	Thita Lamsam	Thailand	90.13	35	33.33	36	56.80	
WD	Isadora Williams	Brazil	withdrew	32	38.52	withdrew from competition		

=== Pairs ===
Rank	Name	Nation	Total points	SP		FS		Olympic Qualification
1	Minerva Fabienne Hase / Nolan Seegert	Germany	185.25	2	66.26	2	118.99	–
2	Laura Barquero / Marco Zandron	Spain	181.61	3	62.01	1	119.60	Qualified
3	Karina Safina / Luka Berulava	Georgia	178.16	1	66.46	3	111.70	Qualified
4	Annika Hocke / Robert Kunkel	Germany	168.21	5	59.11	5	109.10	–
5	Hailey Kops / Evgeni Krasnopolski	Israel	167.08	7	55.58	4	111.50	Qualified
6	Wang Yuchen / Huang Yihang	China	162.66	4	60.21	6	102.45	Reserve 1
7	Bogdana Lukashevich / Alexander Stepanov	Belarus	159.08	6	58.25	7	100.83	Reserve 2
8	Anastasia Golubeva / Hektor Giotopoulos Moore	Australia	149.35	13	49.55	8	99.80	Reserve 3
9	Daria Danilova / Michel Tsiba	Netherlands	145.26	8	55.39	9	89.87	Reserve 4
10	Sara Conti / Niccolò Macii	Italy	143.44	9	53.96	11	89.48	
11	Sofiia Holichenko / Artem Darenskyi	Ukraine	142.38	10	52.63	10	89.75	
12	Lana Petranović / Antonio Souza-Kordeiru	Croatia	141.18	11	52.42	12	88.76	
13	Coline Keriven / Noël-Antoine Pierre	France	137.50	12	51.23	13	86.27	
14	Greta Crafoord / John Crafoord	Sweden	134.40	14	48.87	14	85.53	
15	Zoe Jones / Christopher Boyadji	Great Britain	129.12	15	44.90	15	84.22	
16	Anna Hernik / Michał Woźniak	Poland	105.42	16	40.05	16	65.37	

=== Ice dance ===
Rank	Name	Nation	Total points	RD		FD		Olympic Qualification
1	Juulia Turkkila / Matthias Versluis	Finland	181.19	1	70.92	1	110.27	Qualified
2	Katharina Müller / Tim Dieck	Germany	173.74	4	68.47	3	105.27	–
3	Maria Kazakova / Georgy Reviya	Georgia	173.20	5	66.95	2	106.25	Qualified
4	Tina Garabedian / Simon Proulx-Sénécal	Armenia	173.03	3	68.61	4	104.42	Qualified
5	Natálie Taschlerová / Filip Taschler	Czech Republic	172.98	2	70.51	5	102.47	Qualified
6	Anna Yanovskaya / Ádám Lukács	Hungary	160.41	8	64.68	6	95.74	Reserve 1
7	Yura Min / Daniel Eaton	South Korea	158.54	6	66.79	10	91.75	Reserve 2
8	Carolina Portesi Peroni / Michael Chrastecky	Italy	157.74	10	62.69	7	95.05	Reserve 3
9	Holly Harris / Jason Chan	Australia	157.21	9	63.05	8	94.16	Reserve 4
10	Shira Ichilov / Laurent Abecassis	Israel	154.76	7	64.90	11	89.86	
11	Sasha Fear / George Waddell	Great Britain	154.24	11	60.51	9	93.73	
12	Charlotte Lafond-Fournier / Richard Kang-in Kam	New Zealand	146.18	13	58.61	12	87.57	
13	Lara Luft / Maximilian Pfisterer	Germany	144.21	12	59.23	13	84.98	
14	Yuliia Zhata / Berk Akalın	Turkey	140.66	14	56.49	14	84.17	
15	Viktoriia Lopusova / Asaf Kazimov	Germany	132.00	15	56.37	16	75.63	
16	Anne-Marie Wolf / Max Liebers	Germany	129.80	16	53.65	15	76.15	
17	Ekaterina Kuznetsova / Oleksandr Kolosovskyi	Azerbaijan	123.97	17	52.14	18	71.83	
18	Mária Sofia Pucherová / Nikita Lysak	Slovakia	120.51	20	46.20	17	74.31	
19	Chelsea Verhaegh / Sherim van Geffen	Netherlands	118.68	19	47.88	19	70.80	
20	Ekaterina Mitrofanova / Vladislav Kasinskij	Bosnia and Herzegovina	113.98	18	48.53	20	65.45	
WD	Viktoria Semenjuk / Ilya Yukhimuk	Belarus	withdrew	withdrew from competition				

== Olympic qualification event ==
Initially, a total of six spots per singles event, three spots in pairs, and four spots in ice dance were available at the Nebelhorn Trophy. One additional quota spot became available in men's singles following the 2021 World Championships. Available spots were allocated in descending order of placement among eligible nations.

Only ISU member nations that had not already earned an entry to the Olympics via the 2021 World Championships were allowed to attempt to earn a qualification berth at Nebelhorn Trophy. However, if a country earned two or three spots at the World Championships, but did not have two or three skaters, respectively, qualify for the free skating/dance, then they were allowed to send a skater/team who did not qualify for the free segment at World Championships to Nebelhorn Trophy to qualify the remaining spot. The following ISU member nations were eligible to qualify a second or third spot in the listed disciplines at Nebelhorn Trophy:

Spot #	Men	Women	Pairs	Dance
3	United States; ROC (Note: Russia is allowed to compete under its own name and flag at non-world championship-level ISU events, including the 2021 CS Nebelhorn Trophy, but will compete as "ROC" under the Russian Olympic Committee flag at the 2022 Winter Olympics due to doping sanctions against the country.)	United States	China	—N/a
2	Canada; France; South Korea	Belgium; Austria	Japan	Italy; Great Britain
All other ISU member nations not previously qualified were eligible to earn one quota spot.

Unlike at the World Championships, where countries could qualify more than one spot depending on the placement of their skater(s), at Nebelhorn Trophy, countries could earn only one spot per discipline, regardless of ranking. The following ISU member nations qualified a berth for their National Olympic Committee at Nebelhorn Trophy:

Men	Women	Pairs	Dance
United States	United States	Spain	Finland
France	Poland	Georgia	Georgia
ROC	Belarus	Israel	Armenia
South Korea	Switzerland		Czech Republic
Azerbaijan	Ukraine		
Australia	Australia		
Canada			

If a country declines to use one or more of its qualified spots for the Olympics, the vacated spot will be awarded using the results of Nebelhorn Trophy in descending order of placement. The following countries are next in line for Olympic quota spots:

Men	Women	Pairs	Dance
Turkey	Italy	China	Hungary
Armenia	Cyprus	Belarus	South Korea
Great Britain	Chinese Taipei	Australia	Italy
Germany	Slovenia	Netherlands	Australia
