= Aldís Kara Bergsdóttir =

Icelandic figure skater (born 2003)

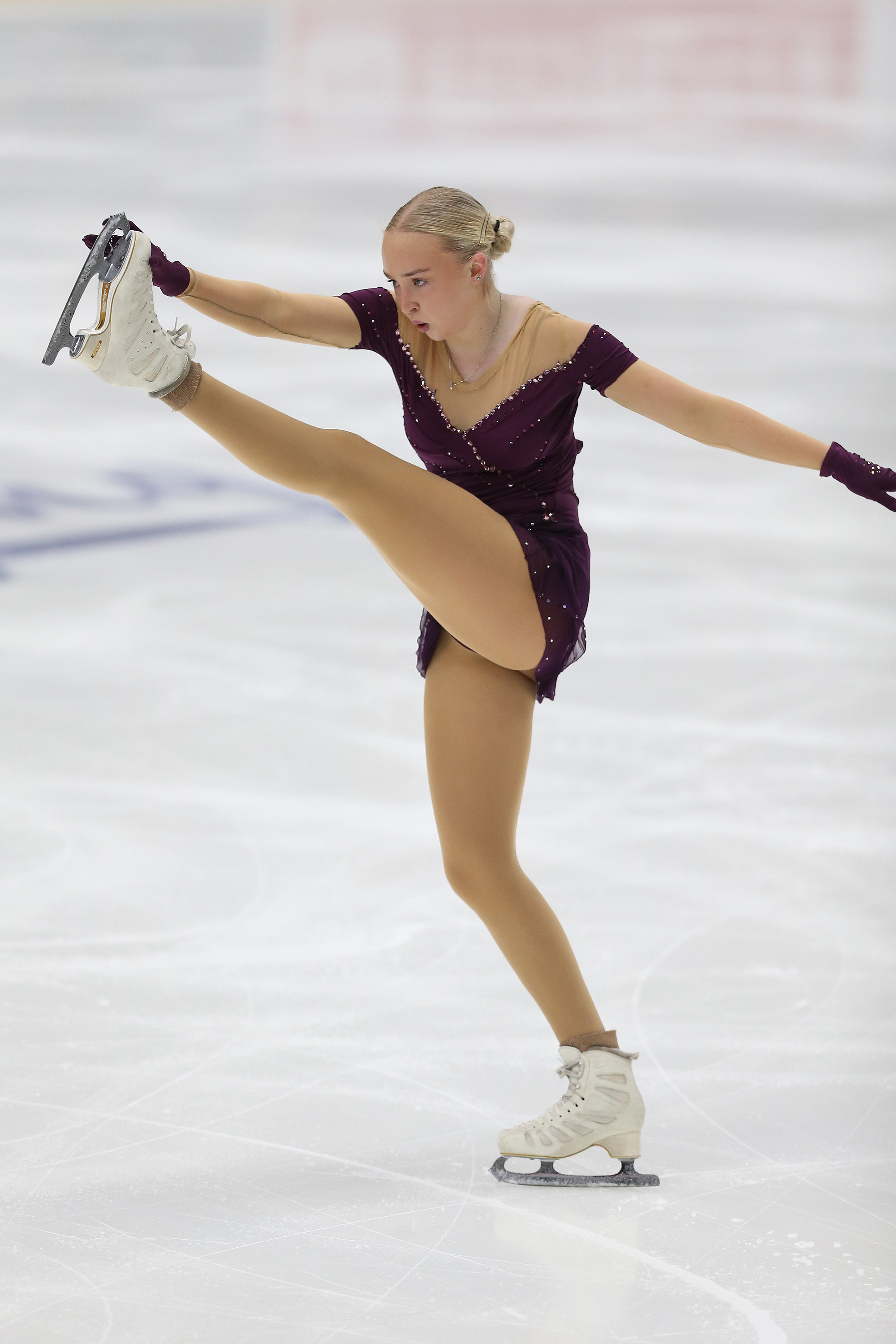
- Aldís Kara Bergsdóttir at 2021 Finlandia Trophy

Personal information
- Native name: Aldís Kara Bergsdóttir
- Born: 10 March 2003 (age 23) Akureyri, Iceland
- Home town: Akureyri
- Height: 1.74 m (5 ft 8 1/2 in)

Figure skating career
- Country: Iceland
- Coach: Darja Zajencko
- Skating club: Skautafélag Akureyrar
- Began skating: 2010
- Retired: 2022

Aldís Kara Bergsdóttir (born 10 March 2003) is a retired Icelandic figure skater. She is a two-time senior national champion. She is the first Icelandic skater to successfully complete a triple loop in a competition and is also the first competitor from Iceland to compete at Junior Worlds. In 2019, 2020, and 2021, she was named the Icelandic Skater of the Year. Additionally, she earned a 12th place Icelandic Sportsperson of the Year 2021 from the Association of Sports Journalists

== Personal life ==
Aldís Kara Bergsdóttir was born on 10 March 2003 in Akureyri, Iceland. She has a sister Hilma Bóel who skates ice hockey and is a part of the National team in Ice Hockey. Her boyfriend, Baltasar Ari Hjálmarsson is also a hockey player and plays for the national team.

== Career ==
Aldís Kara started skating at the age of 5 in Akureyri and her first official competition was in 2010. She has represented the Skautafélag Akureyrar in Akureyri since the start of her career.

=== 2017–2018 season ===
She debuted in juniors at the last domestic competition of the year in Iceland, Vetrarmót 2018, placing 6th Prior to that she had been a member of the novice national team.

=== 2018–2019 season ===
Aldís Kara started the season well with a couple of domestic competitions and then on to Icelandic National Championships where she placed 2nd in juniors. She represented Iceland at the Reykjavik International Games where she claimed a silver medal and set a national junior record of 108.45 points. From there she represented Iceland at The Nordics, where she placed 12th, setting a best score by an Icelandic competitor in the junior category with 103.52 points.

=== 2019–2020 season ===
Aldís Kara was chosen to represent Iceland at 2019–20 ISU Junior Grand Prix. At her JGP debut, she placed 20th with record scores for an Icelandic competitor at JGP.

In October she went to Halloween Cup in Budapest where she obtained the TES minimum in the short program for Junior Worlds.

At Vetrarmót 2019 in Iceland she broke all national records in junior categories and became the Junior National Champion at Icelandic Championships 2019 in December. Her year ended with being nominated by the Icelandic Skating Association as the Skater of the Year 2019.

At Reykjavik International Games Aldís Kara broke yet another national record in SP of 45.25 points and was the first Icelander to successfully complete a triple loop at a competition.

At The Nordics Open she obtained the TES scores in the free program and bettered Iceland's performance in junior category at Nordics, placing 8th with 115.39 points, becoming the first Icelander to earn a ticket to Junior Worlds 2020.

Aldís Kara competed at Junior Worlds in Tallinn, Estonia in March 2020. She placed 35th and did not reach the free program

=== 2020–2021 season ===
In December 2020, Aldís Kara was named the Icelandic Skater of the Year for the second consecutive year. In beginning of the year 2021 Aldís Kara started her senior career and won gold at Reykjavik International Games in January. In conjunction with the Games highest ranking competitors were awarded the National Champion title of Iceland in senior setting national records in the short program, free program and total score.

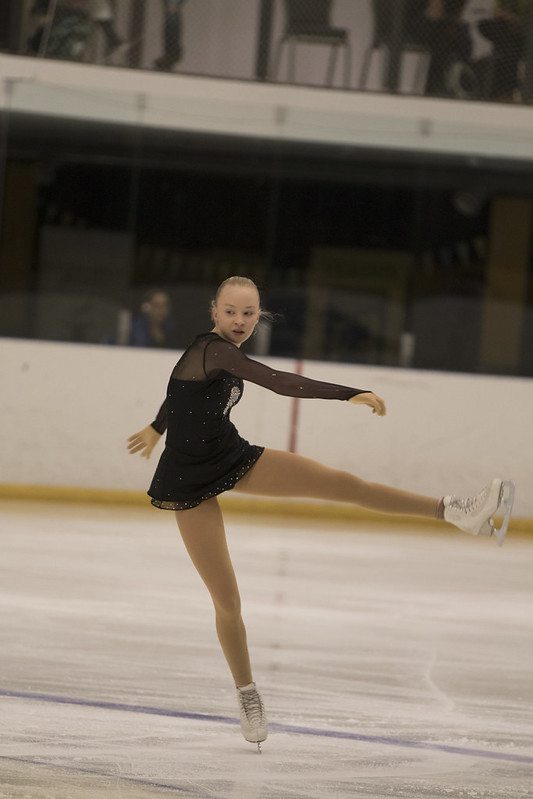
Aldís Kara Bergsdóttir at 2018 National Championships

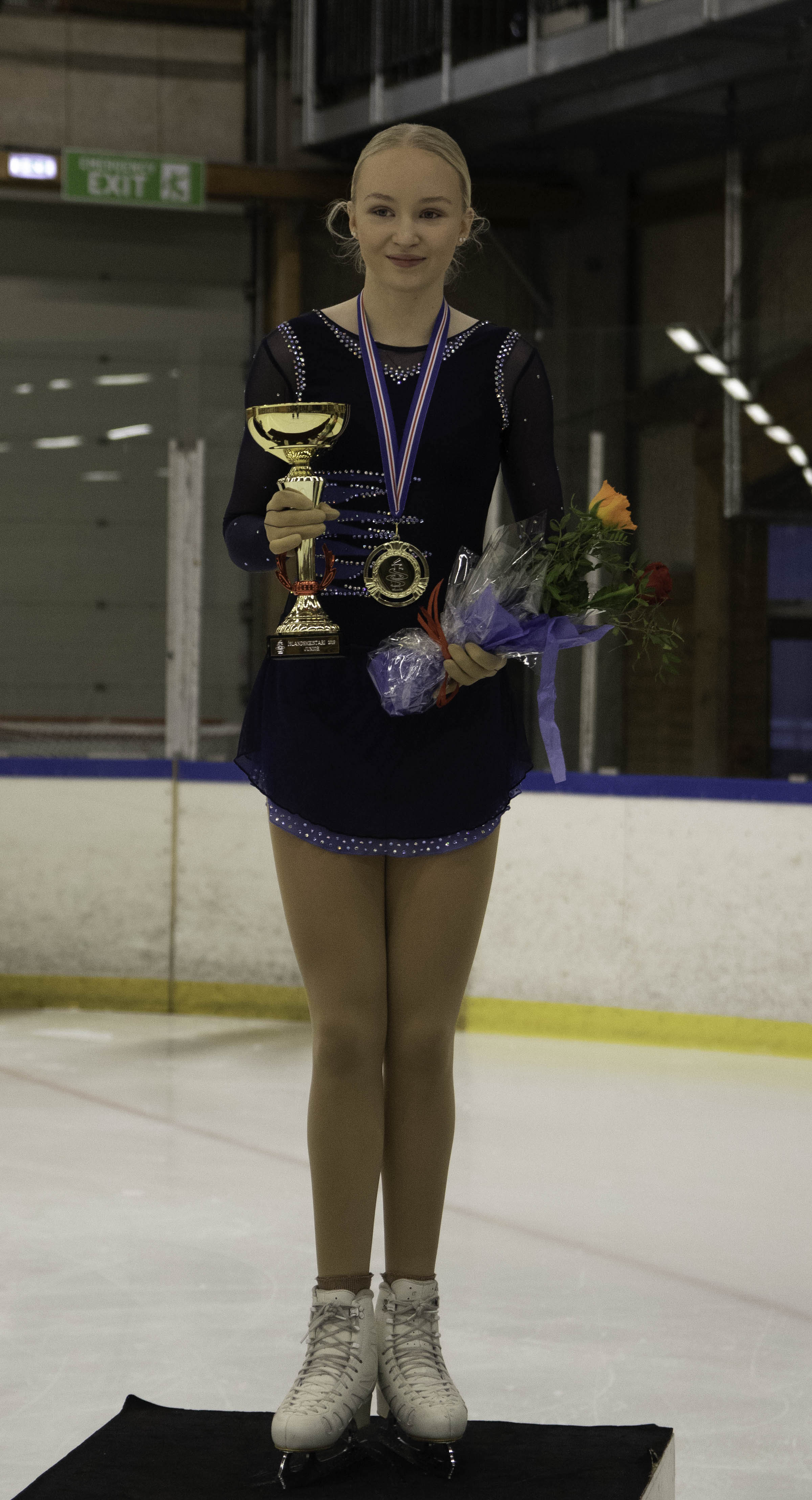
National Junior Champion 2019

=== 2021–2022 season ===
Aldís Kara competed at the 2021 CS Nebelhorn Trophy on the Challenger series, the final qualifier for the 2022 Winter Olympics, where she placed thirty-second. She was the first ever Icelandic native to do so. During the Nebelhorn Trophy she obtained the minimum TES scores in the free program for the ISU European Championships. Aldís Kara then proceeded to 2021 CS Finlandia Trophy where she attempted to get minimum scores in the short program for the European Championships and successfully did so thus becoming the first ever Icelander native to qualify for the European Championships. She claimed her 2nd senior national champion title in November with record points. In December 2021 she was elected skater of the year by the Icelandic Skating Association for the 3rd consecutive year

Bergsdóttir announced her retirement from competitive skating on 3 December 2022.

== Programs ==
Season	Short program	Free skating
2021–2022	Experience by Ludovico Einaudi	A Thousand Times Good Night (from Romeo & Juliet) by Abel Korzeniowski; Piano Lesson With Grandma (from Extremely Loud & Incredibly Close) by Alexandre Desplat, Jean-Yves Thibaude; Hidden Machinations; Yearning Hearts by Eternal Eclipse
2019–2021	Grandioso by Edvin Marton	Tristan and Isolde by Maxime Rodriguez
2018–2019	O Verona; Dance of the Knights (from Romeo and Juliet) by Sergei Prokofiev	Ruled by Secrecy by Muse

== Competitive highlights ==
International
Event	18–19	19–20	20–21	21–22
Europeans				33rd
CS Finlandia				23rd
CS Nebelhorn				32nd
Reykjavik International			1st	2nd
Nordics				9th
International: Junior
Junior Worlds		35th		
JGP U.S.		20th		
Nordics	12th	8th		
Halloween Cup		15th		
Reykjavik International	2nd	5th		
National
Icelandic Champ.	2nd J.	1st J.	1st S.	1st S.

== Detailed results ==
=== Senior results ===
2021–2022 season
Date	Event	SP	FS	Total
10–16 January 2022	2022 European Championships	34; 42.23	-	34; 42.23
22–25 September 2021	2021 CS Nebelhorn Trophy	31; 39.92	32; 78.17	32; 118.09
7–10 October 2021	2021 CS Finlandia Trophy	23; 45.45	23; 76.66	23; 122.11
19–21 November 2021	2021 Icelandic National Championships	1; 47.31	1; 88.83	1; 136.14
2020–2021 season
Date	Event	SP	FS	Total
29–31 January 2021	2020 Icelandic National Championships	1; 40.93	1; 82.51	1; 123.44
29–31 January 2021	2020 Reykjavik International Games	1; 40.93	1; 82.51	1; 123.44

=== Junior results ===
2021–2022 season
Date	Event	SP	FS	Total
13–17 April 2022	2022 World Junior Championships	TBD		
2019–2020 season
Date	Event	SP	FS	Total
2–8 March 2020	2020 World Junior Championships	35; 44.85	-	35; 44.85
6–9 February 2020	2020 Nordics Open	18; 35.13	5; 80.26	8; 115.39
24–26 January 2020	2020 Reykjavik International Games	2; 45.25	8; 68.29	5; 113.54
30 Nov. – 1 Dec. 2019	2019 Icelandic Junior Championships	2; 39.74	1; 78.48	1; 118.22
17–20 October 2019	2019 Halloween Cup	12; 40.70	18; 67.91	15; 108.61
28–31 August 2019	2019 JGP United States	20; 39.28	21; 67.15	20; 106.20
2018–2019 season
Date	Event	SP	FS	Total
7–10 February 2019	2019 Nordics Open	13; 36.66	12; 66.86	12; 103.52
1–3 February 2019	2019 Reykjavik International Games	3; 36.33	2; 72.12	2; 108.45
1–2 December 2018	2018 Icelandic Junior Championships	2; 37.94	2; 62.57	2; 100.51
