= Nadia Margrét Jamchi =

Icelandic figure skater

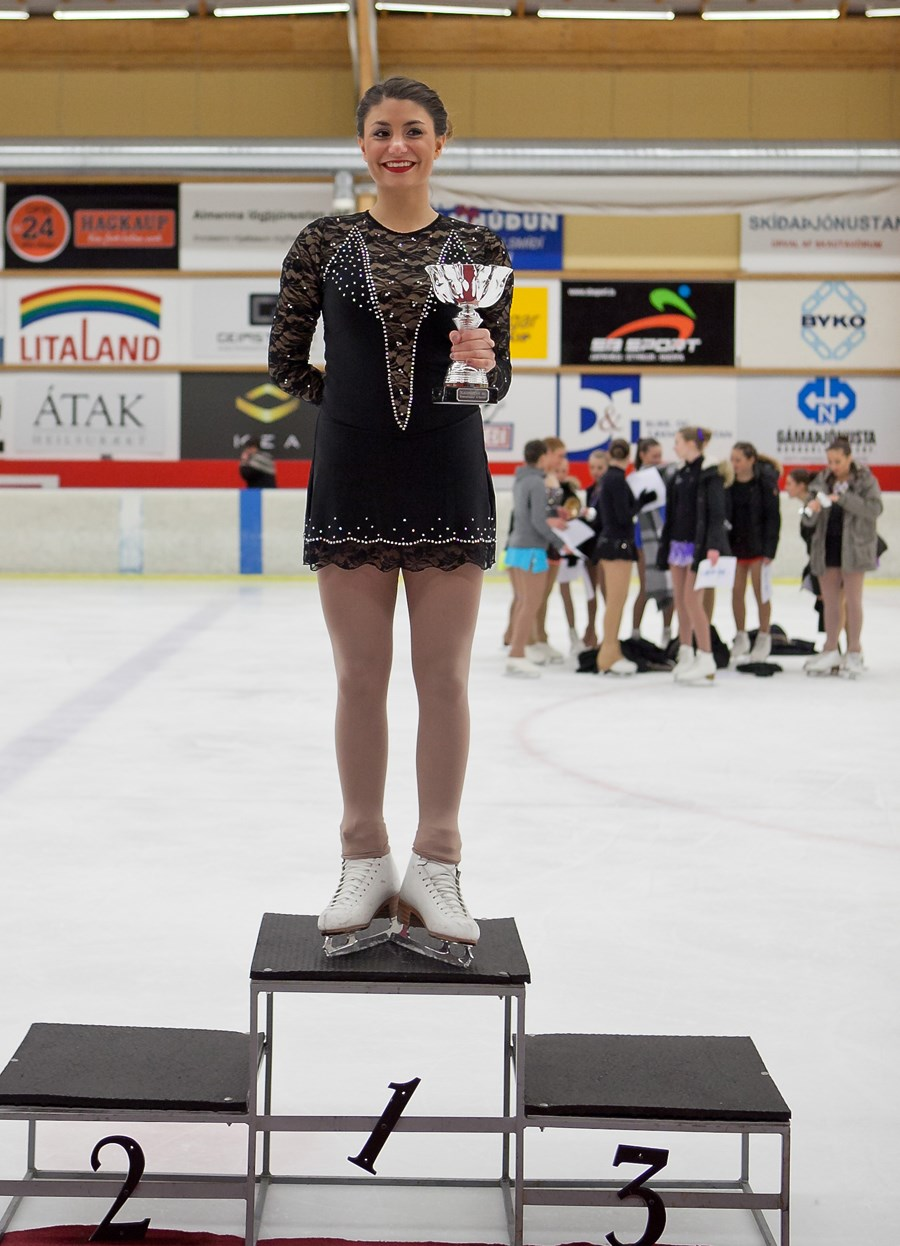
- Senior National Champion of Iceland 2014

Personal information
- Born: June 22, 1994 (age 32) San Diego, California, U.S.
- Home town: Reykjavík, Iceland
- Height: 5 ft 4 in (1.63 m)

Figure skating career
- Country: Iceland
- Coach: Guillaume Kermen
- Skating club: Reykjavík Skating Club
- Began skating: 1999
- Retired: 2014

Nadia Margrét Jamchi (born June 22, 1994) is a retired American-born Icelandic figure skater. She is a multiple national medallist including a double Icelandic National Champion, once junior and once senior.

== Personal life ==
Nadia Margrét Jamchi was born June 22, 1994, in San Diego, California.

After retiring she started a coaching career with her former club, Skautafélag Reykjavíkur. In 2018 she was chosen by the Icelandic Skating Association for a four-year Coaching Development Program for coaches from the Nordic countries and sanctioned by the ISU.

Nadia Margrét is also a certified Technical Specialist with the Icelandic Skating Association.

In 2019 she graduated from the medical department of the University of Iceland with a master's degree and works as a physical therapist. Her thesis Risk factors of overtraining and overuse injuries in children was based on her experience as a skater and coach in figure skating.

== Career ==
Nadia Margrét started skating at the age of 5 in San Diego. After moving to Iceland she trained at Skautafélag Reykjavíkur with Guillaume Kermen and also Svetlana Ahkmer and Nikolay Shashkov. During summers she attended skating camps in Sweden where she trained with Jennifer Molin and Thomas Öberg. She also skated with Patrice Paillares in Montpellier, France.

=== Early years as novice ===
Nadia Margrét debuted with the national team of Iceland at Nordic Championships 2007 as a novice after placing 3rd at Icelandic National Championships.

=== 2010–2011 season ===
This season was her junior debut and in November Nadia Margrét was one of four Icelandic skaters that were invited to participate in the Open Belgian Championships where she placed 8th. In December 2010 she became the Icelandic junior national champion. In April 2011 she was a part of the Icelandic national team at Coupe du Printemps in Luxembourg.

=== 2011–2012 season ===
Nadia Margrét earned a bronze at Icelandic junior nationals in December and went to Skate Malmö 2012 and placed 16th.

=== 2012–2013 season ===
In December 2012 she earned a bronze medal at Icelandic junior nationals. Year 2013 started with participation at Reykjavik International Games. Then she was again chosen for the national team, on home ground in Reykjavik, at The Nordics in 2013. In March she went with the national team for the second time to Coupe du Printemps.

=== 2013–2014 season ===
She skipped Icelandic nationals in December 2013 but debuted as a senior to earn a gold medal in at Reykjavik International Games in January 2014.

=== 2014–2015 season ===
Nadia Margrét became the senior national champion in December 2014 before having to retire due to persistent injuries.

== Programs ==
Season	Short program	Free skating
2013–2014	Burlesque by Christophe Beck	Oblivion by Astor Piazzolla; Deep Inside by GusGus
2011–2013	Burlesque by Christophe Beck	Yumeji's Theme by Shigeru Umebayashi
2010–2011	The Feeling Begins by Peter Gabriel; Eyes like yours by Shakira, Pablo Flores, Javier Garza, Gloria Estefan	The Devil's Trill Sonata performed by Vanessa-Mae; Viva! performed by Bond

== Competitive highlights ==
International
Event	09–10	10–11	11–12	12–13	13–14	14–15
International
Reykjavík International Games					1st	
International: Junior
Coupe du Printemps		27th		24th		
Reykjavík International Games	8th	6th	4th	4th		
The Nordics				18th		
Open Belgian Championships		8th				
National
Icelandic Champ.	2nd J.	1st J.	3rd J.	3rd J.		1st S.

== Gallery ==
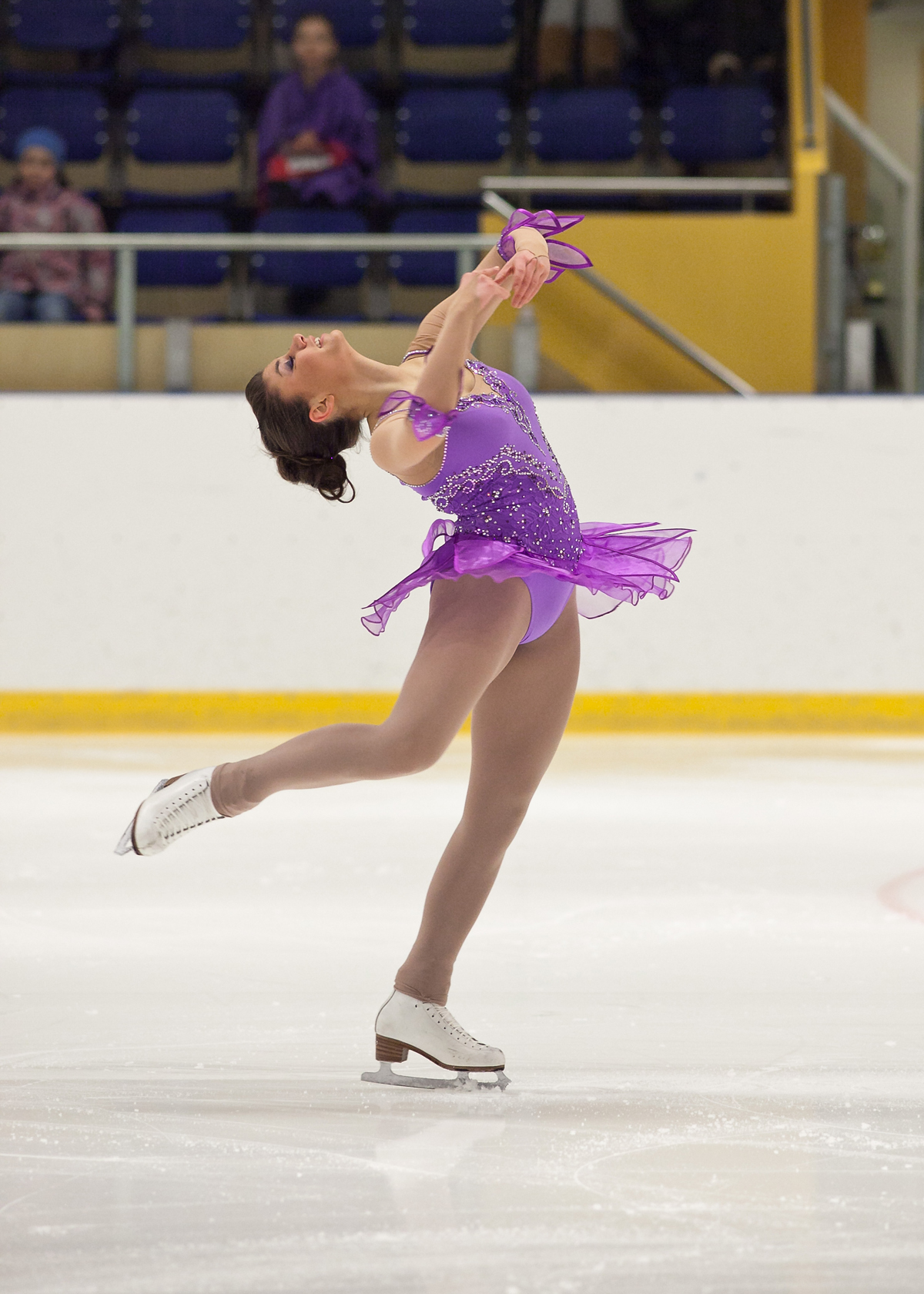
Nadia Margrét Jamchi at Nordics 2013

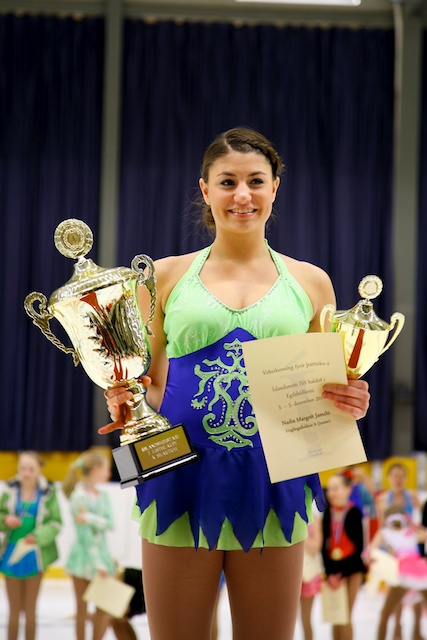
Junior Champion 2010
