= Júlía Sylvía Gunnarsdóttir =

Icelandic figure skater (born 2005)

Personal information
- Born: 15 January 2005 (age 21) Reykjavík, Iceland
- Home town: Reykjavík
- Height: 1.63 m (5 ft 4 in)

Figure skating career
- Country: Hungary (since 2026); Iceland (until 2026)
- Discipline: Pair skating (since 2024); Women's singles (until 2023)
- Partner: Mozes Jozsef Berei (since 2026); Manuel Piazza (2024–26)
- Coach: Ondřej Hotárek; Rosanna Murante; Benjamin Naggiar
- Skating club: Ungmennafélagið Fjölnir
- Began skating: 2011

Medal record
Icelandic Championships
Gold medal – first place	2023 Akureyri	Singles
Gold medal – first place	2024 Reykjavík	Pairs
Gold medal – first place	2025 Reykjavík	Pairs

Júlía Sylvía Gunnarsdóttir (born 15 January 2005) is an Icelandic pair skater who currently represents Hungary.

With her former skating partner, Manuel Piazza, she is the 2025 Diamond Spin champion, 2025 Cup of Innsbruck bronze medalist, 2024 NRW Trophy bronze medalist and a two-time Icelandic national champion (2025–26). Gunnarsdóttir and Piazza are the first pairs team to represent Iceland in international competition.

As a single skater, Gunnarsdóttir is the 2024 Reykjavík International Games champion, the 2023 Diamond Spin bronze medalist, the 2023 Icelandic national champion, and the 2022 Icelandic national Junior champion. She is the first Icelander figure skater to win an international competition.

== Personal life ==
Gunnarsdóttir was born on 15 January 2005 in Reykjavík, Iceland.

== Career ==
=== 2024–25 season: Debut of Gunnarsdóttir/Piazza ===
Gunnarsdóttir transitioned from singles to pair skating over the summer before the 2024–25 season. Her coaches were contacted by Italian pair skater Manuel Piazza's coaches, inquiring as to whether she would be interested in switching disciplines. Gunnarsdóttir traveled to Italy for a tryout with Piazza and his team, and the pair officially announced their partnership for Iceland in August 2024. They split their training between Reykjavík, Iceland with coach Benjamin Naggiar and Bergamo, Italy with coaches, Ondřej Hotárek and Rosanna Murante.

Gunnarsdóttir/Piazza made their international debut in November 2024 at the 2024 NRW Trophy. They placed third in both the short program and the free skate to claim the bronze medal behind new Swiss team Oxana Vouillamoz / Tom Bouvart and Swedish sibling pair Greta Crafoord / John Crafoord. At their second international event, the 2024 CS Warsaw Cup, Gunnarsdóttir/Piazza placed twelfth.

Gunnarsdóttir/Piazza competed at the 2025 Icelandic Championships at the end of November unchallenged, winning their first national pairs title by default. Having earned their ISU technical minimum scores at the NRW Trophy, Gunnarsdóttir/Piazza were assigned to compete at the 2025 European Championships in Estonia in January. At Europeans, Gunnarsdóttir/Piazza scored a personal best of 48.58, placing eighteenth in the segment. They did not advance to the free skate portion of the competition.

=== 2025–26 season ===
Gunnarsdóttir/Piazza opened their season with a fourth-place finish at the 2025 Lombardia Trophy. One week later, they placed eighth at the ISU Skate to Milano.

In October, Gunnarsdóttir/Piazza competed at the 2025 Diamond Spin and the 2025 Swiss Open, winning gold and placing fifth, respectively. The following month, the pair won the bronze medal at the 2025 Cup of Innsbruck and the gold medal at the 2026 Icelandic Championships. In January, Gunnarsdóttir/Piazza placed eleventh at the 2026 European Championships, scoring personal bests in all three competition segments.

=== 2026–27 season: Partnership with Berei ===
In September, Gunnarsdóttir announced via her Instagram that she would begin representing Hungary alongside Mozes Jozsef Berei

== Programs ==
=== With Piazza ===
Season	Short program	Free skating
2025–2026	Imagine by John Lennon performed by Audiomachine choreo. by Benjamin Naggiar	West Side Story; Maria; Tonight by Leonard Bernstein & Stephen Sondheim choreo. by Benjamin Naggiar
2024–2025	Pray (from Game of Thrones) by Matt Bellamy choreo. by Benjamin Naggiar	West Side Story; Maria; Tonight by Leonard Bernstein & Stephen Sondheim choreo. by Benjamin Naggiar

=== As a single skater ===
Season	Short program	Free skating
2023–2024	Lie by BTS choreo. by Benjamin Naggiar	Yo soy María by Astor Piazzolla and Horacio Ferrer choreo. by Benjamin Naggiar
2022–2023	Lie by BTS choreo. by Benjamin Naggiar	To Build a Home by The Cinematic Orchestra; In This Shirt by The Irrepressibles choreo. by Benjamin Naggiar
2021–2022	Megapolis by Bel Suono choreo. by Yulia Lipnitskaya	A Time For Us performed by David Davidson; Mother's Journey by Yann Tiersen; Forbidden Love (from Romeo & Juliet) by Abel Korzeniowski choreo. by Clair Anne

== Competitive highlights ==
- JGP – Event of the ISU Junior Grand Prix Series
- CS – Event of the ISU Challenger Series
- TBD – Assigned
- WD – Withdrew from competition

=== Pair skating with Piazza ===
Competition placements at senior level
Season	2024–25	2025–26
European Championships	18th	11th
Icelandic Championships	1st	1st
CS Warsaw Cup	12th	
Cup of Innsbruck		3rd
Diamond Spin		1st
Lombardia Trophy		4th
NRW Trophy	3rd	
Road to 26 Trophy	7th	
Skate to Milano		8th

=== Single skating ===
Competition placements at senior level
Season	2023–24
Icelandic Championships	1st
Diamond Spin	3rd
Nordic Championships	9th
Reykjavik Games	1st
Volvo Open Cup	8th

Competition placements at junior level
Season	2020–21	2021–22	2022–23	2023–24
Icelandic Championships		2nd	1st	
JGP Czech Republic			31st	
JGP Italy			36th	
JGP Slovenia		28th		
JGP Turkey				19th
Nordic Championships		19th	16th	
Reykjavik Games	2nd	6th		
Santa Claus Cup			30th	

== Detailed results ==
=== Pair skating with Manuel Piazza ===
ISU personal best scores in the +5/-5 GOE System
Segment	Type	Score	Event
Total	TSS	162.62	2026 European Championships
Short program	TSS	57.45	2026 European Championships
Short program	TES	32.80	2026 European Championships
Short program	PCS	24.65	2026 European Championships
Free skating	TSS	105.17	2026 European Championships
Free skating	TES	52.83	2026 European Championships
Free skating	PCS	52.34	2026 European Championships

Results in the 2024–25 season
Date	Event	SP		FS		Total	
Date	Event	P	Score	P	Score	P	Score
Nov 13–17, 2024	(Germany) 2024 NRW Trophy	3	47.04	3	93.46	3	140.50
Nov 20–24, 2024	(Poland) 2024 CS Warsaw Cup	14	41.93	11	87.42	12	129.35
Nov 29–Dec 1, 2024	(Iceland) 2024 Icelandic Championships	1	42.30	1	95.31	1	137.61
Jan 28 – Feb 2, 2025	(Estonia) 2025 European Championships	18	48.58	—N/a	—N/a	18	48.58
Feb 18–20, 2025	(Italy) Road to 26 Trophy	6	50.54	7	87.76	7	138.30

Results in the 2025–26 season
Date	Event	SP		FS		Total	
Date	Event	P	Score	P	Score	P	Score
Sep 11–14, 2025	(Italy) 2025 Lombardia Trophy	5	53.21	4	105.70	4	158.91
Sep 18–21, 2025	(China) 2025 Skate to Milano	9	53.09	8	98.94	8	152.03
Oct 16–19, 2025	(Poland) 2025 Diamond Spin	1	48.65	1	91.75	1	140.40
Nov 13–16, 2025	(Austria) 2025 Cup of Innsbruck	6	51.72	2	102.44	3	154.16
Nov 28–30, 2025	(Iceland) 2025 Icelandic Championships	1	51.59	2	99.23	1	150.82
Jan 13–18, 2026	(United Kingdom) 2026 European Championships	9	57.45	11	105.17	11	162.62
