= Sigurlaug Árnadóttir =

Icelandic figure skater (born 1984)

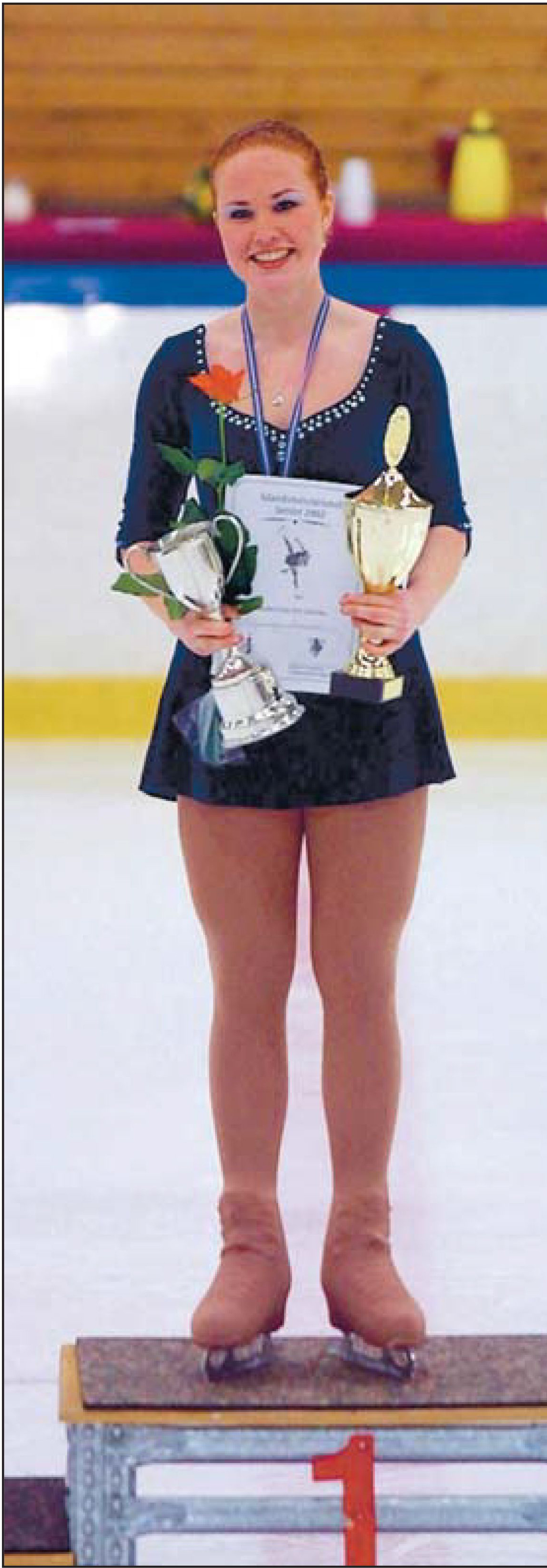
- Sigurlaug Árnadóttir at Nationals 2002

Personal information
- Native name: Sigurlaug Árnadóttir
- Born: 16 July 1984 (age 41) Reykjavík, Iceland
- Home town: Reykjavík
- Height: 1.65 m (5 ft 5 in)

Figure skating career
- Country: Iceland
- Coach: Olga Baranova, Maria Kate O'Connor
- Skating club: Reykjavík Skating Club
- Began skating: 1992
- Retired: 2003

Sigurlaug Árnadóttir (born 16 July 1984) is a retired Icelandic figure skater. She is a seven-time national champion including 1996 and 1997 novice National Champion and senior National Champion for 5 consecutive years from 1998–2002. She is the first Icelandic skater to successfully complete a 2 Axel in a competition. She was the first Icelandic competitor at an international competition and also the first competitor to compete at Junior Grand Prix when she went to Trofeo Rita Trapanese in 2002. Furthermore, she was the first Icelandic skater at The Nordics 2001 and The Nordics 2002.

Sigurlaug was three times chosen as Skater of the Year by the Icelandic Skating Association 1998–2000.

She started skating in 1992 at the age of eight at Reykjavik Skating Club where her main coaches were Olga Baranova and Maria Kate O'Connor. She competed for the first time at Icelandic Nationals in novice in 1996 and became the National Champion at the age of 11. During summers she attended skating camps in Swindon, UK with Lesley Norfolk-Pearce, Czech Republic and with Alexei Mishin in Spain.

Sigurlaug was a member of the Icelandic Synchronized Skating team Ice Cubes and was a member of the first Icelandic team in synchronized Skating that went to the World Championships in 2002 and 2003

She has two sisters who also skated; an older sister, Steinvör Þöll Árnadóttir, who was senior bronze medalist at 1996 National Championships and a younger sister, Ragnhildur Eik Árnadóttir who skated to novice level.

Sigurlaug enrolled into the medical department of the University of Iceland and graduated as a Medical Doctor in 2010. She then furthered her studies and graduated as a Family Physician in 2016 from Erasmus MC in Rotterdam, Holland.

== Programs ==
| Season | Short program | Free skating |
|---|---|---|
| 2001–2002 | Take Five by Dave Brubeck | Solveig's Song by Edvard Grieg |
| 2000–2001 | Bustin' Surfboards from Kill Bill soundtrack | Solveig's Song by Edvard Grieg |

== Competitive highlights ==
| Event | 98–99 | 99–00 | 00–01 | 01–02 |
Synchronized Skating
| World Synchronized Skating Championships | | | | 23rd |
International: Junior
| ISU Junior Grand Prix 2nd Trofeo Rita Trapanese | | | | 32nd |
| Nordics | | | 17th J. | 18th J. |
National
| Icelandic Championships | 1st S. | 1st S. | 1st S. | 1st. S. |

== Gallery ==
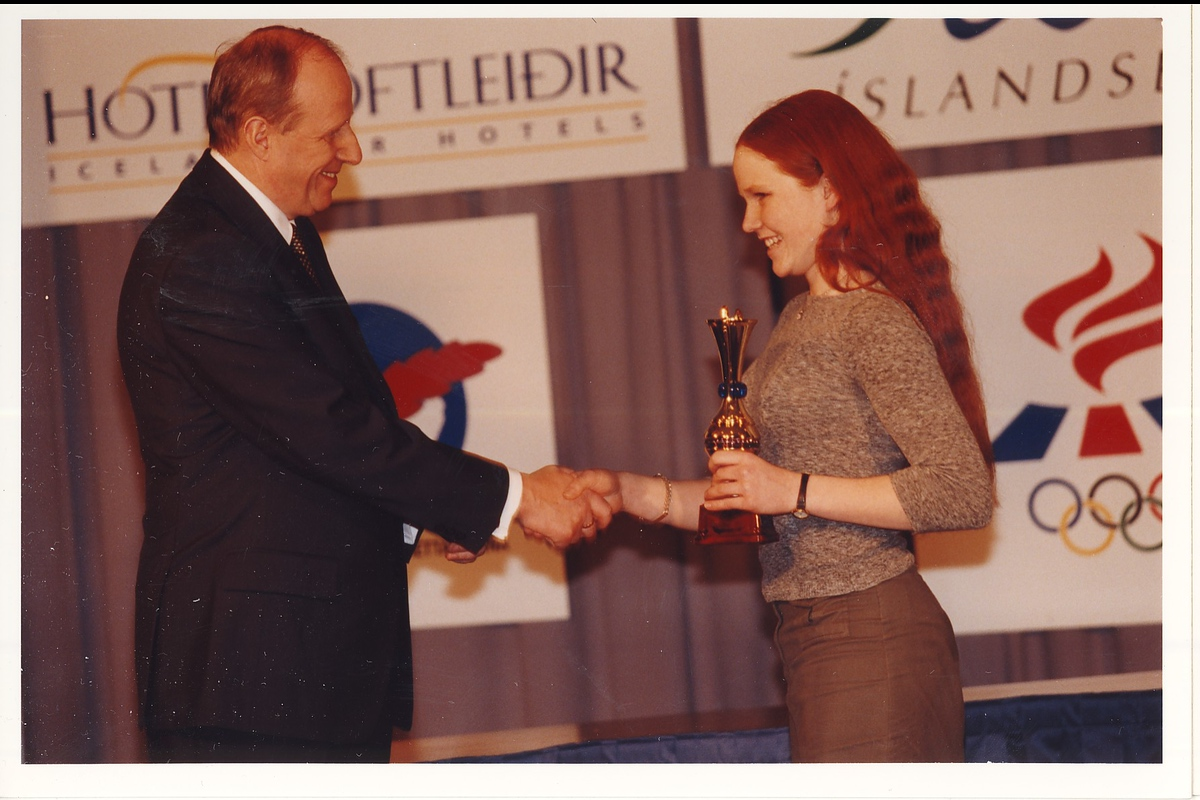
Sigurlaug Árnadóttir accepts Skater of the Year award

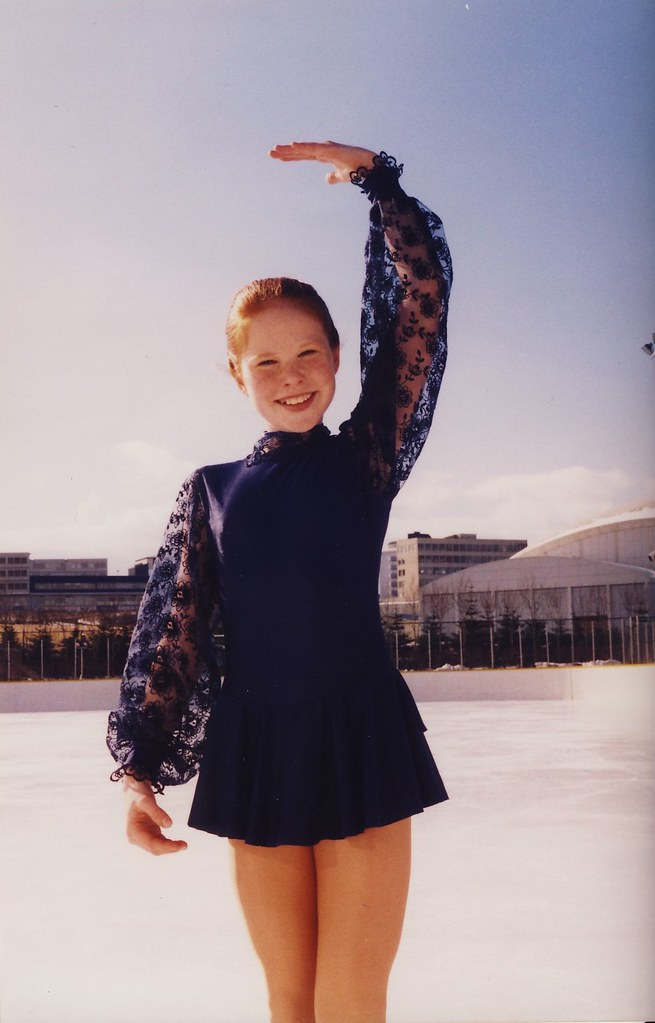
Sigurlaug at 11y

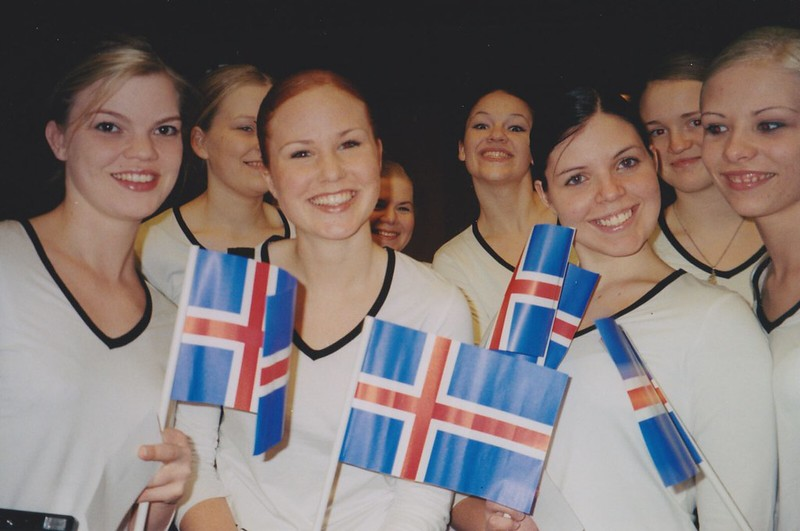
Sigurlaug front 2nd from left with Ice Cubes at Synchro Worlds

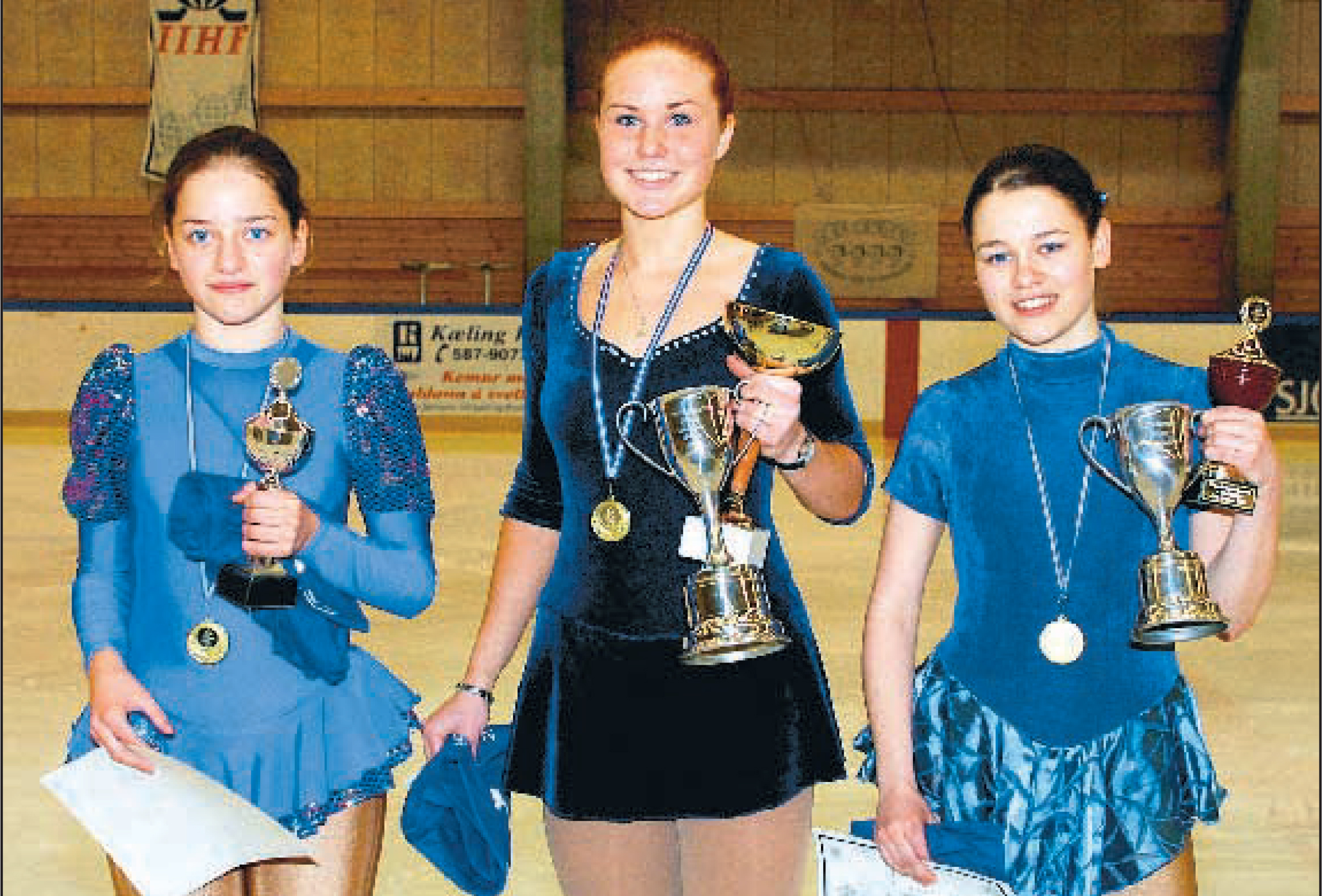
National Champion 2001
