= Guðbjörg Guttormsdóttir =

Icelandic figure skater (born 1989)

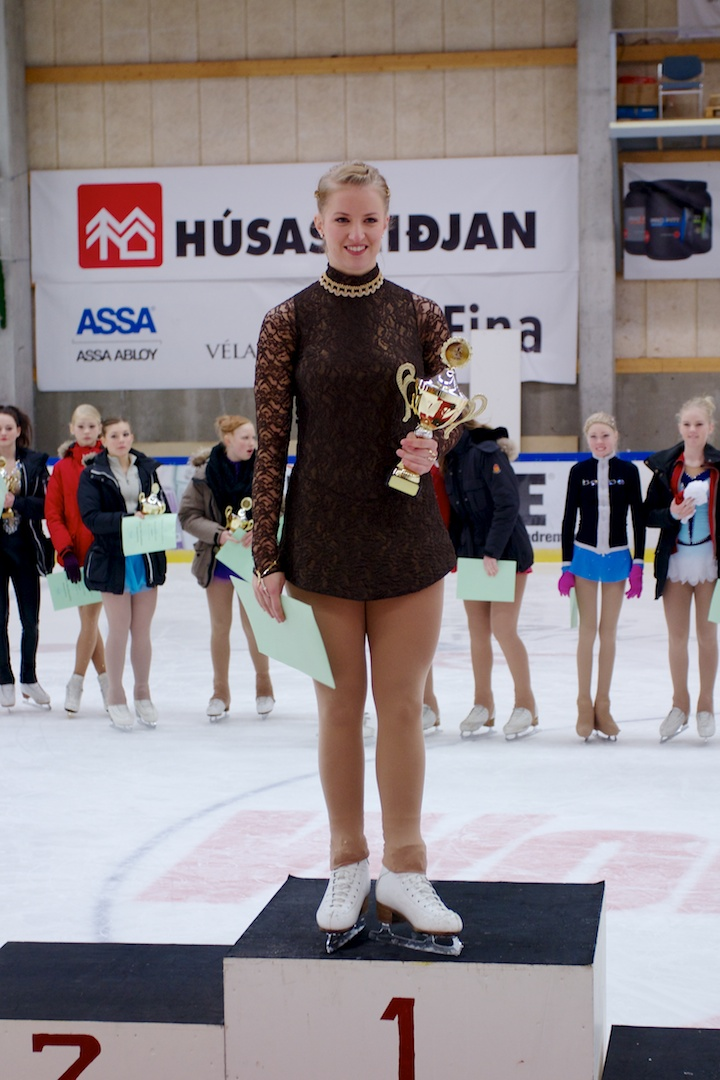
- National Champion 2012

Personal information
- Born: November 6, 1989 (age 36) Reykjavík, Iceland
- Home town: Reykjavík
- Height: 1.63 m (5 ft 4 in)

Figure skating career
- Country: Iceland
- Coach: Nikolay Shashkov
- Skating club: Reykjavík Skating Club
- Began skating: 1998
- Retired: 2013

Guðbjörg Guttormsdóttir (born November 6, 1989) is a retired Icelandic figure skater. She is the 2012 National Champion, 2008 Junior bronze medalist and 2005 Novice silver medalist. She also has a gold from Reykjvík International Games 2013.

== Career ==
She started skating in 1998 at the Reykjavík Skating Club where her main coaches were Jennifer Molin and Guillaume Kermen and later Nikolay Shashkov. During summers she skated in Sweden and USA with Molin and in France with Patrice Paillares. During 2009-2010 she skated in Vancouver B.C at the Vancouver Skating Club with coach Adam Zalegowski (Note: Adam Załęgowski (born 1978) - Polish figure skater, participant of the Polish Championships and international competitions. After ending his sports career, he started working as a coach, initially in Warsaw (2000–2005; his pupils included, among others, Laura Czarnotta and Sebastian Iwasaki) and then in Canada (2005–2012) and Australia (from 2012). He is considered a specialist in learning harness jumping.) but did not compete that year.

She represented the Icelandic National team at three Nordic Championships, twice as junior in 2008 and 2009, and once as senior in 2013.

Guðbjörg is the oldest of four sisters, all of which have skated. She later turned to coaching and judging and holds a national Technical Specialist licence.

She studied biology at the University of Iceland from 2010 to 2017 graduating with a MSc. degree and is currently working as a microbiologist.

Guðbjörg retired from competitive skating 2013.

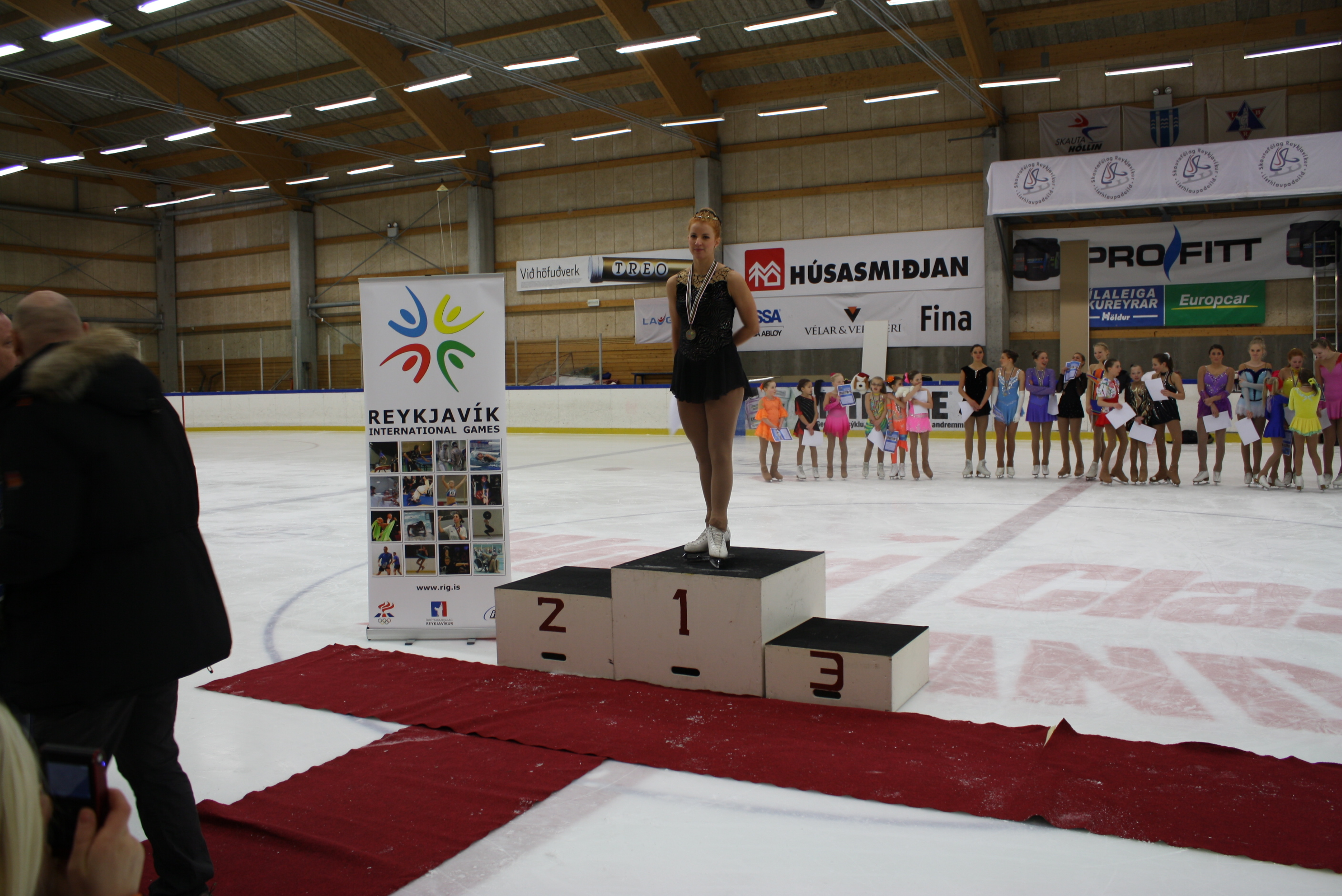
Senior Champion 2013

== Programs ==
Season	Short program	Free skating
2012–2013	Sur les ailes du temps by Saint-Preux	Godfather Soundtrack by David Davidson and Edvin Marton
2011–2012	Secret Garden, Soundtrack by Zbigniew Preisner	Godfather Soundtrack by David Davidson and Edvin Marton
2007–2009	Hava Nagila	Narnia Soundtrack by Harry Gregson-Williams

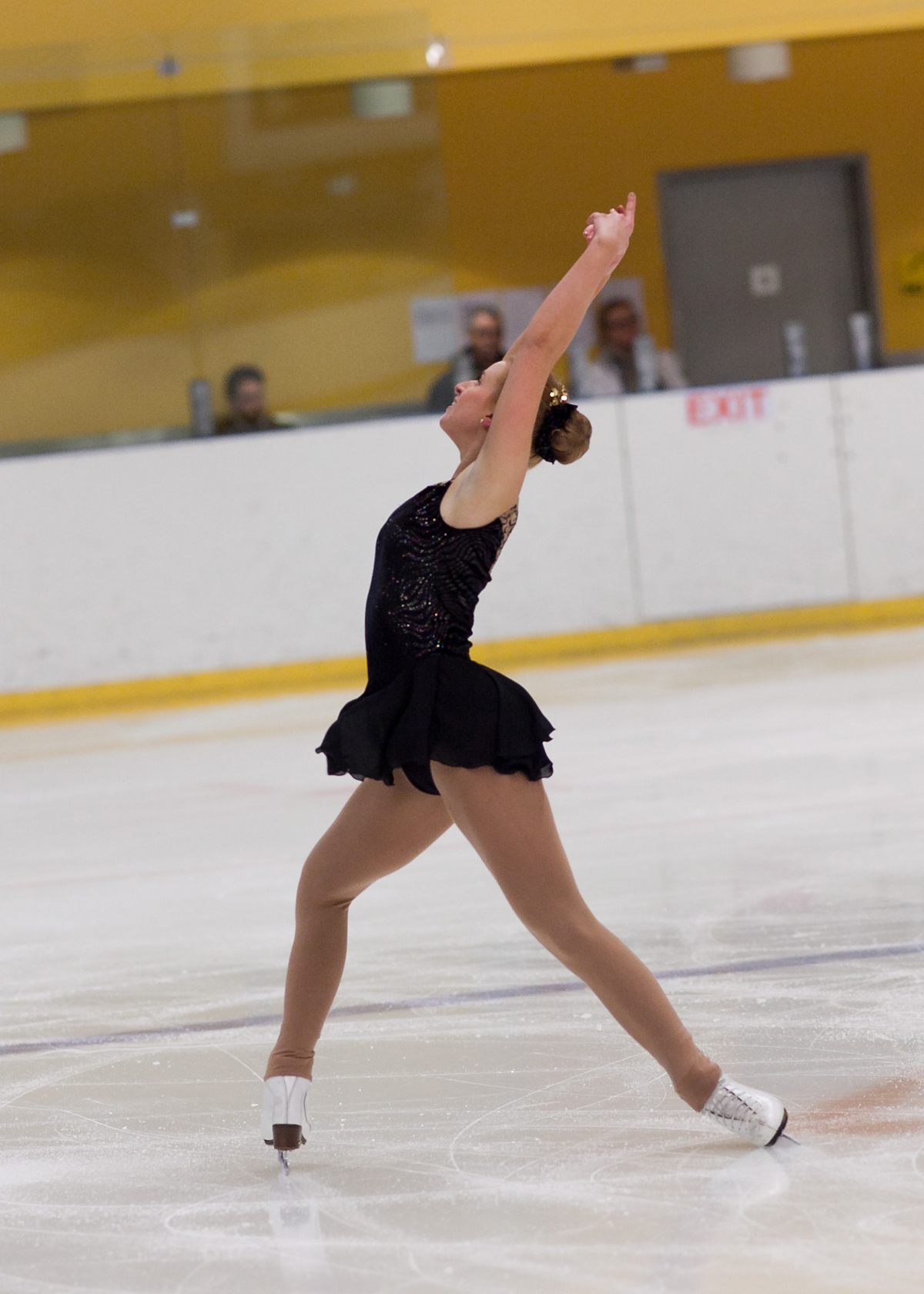
Guðbjörg Guttormsdóttir representing Iceland 2013

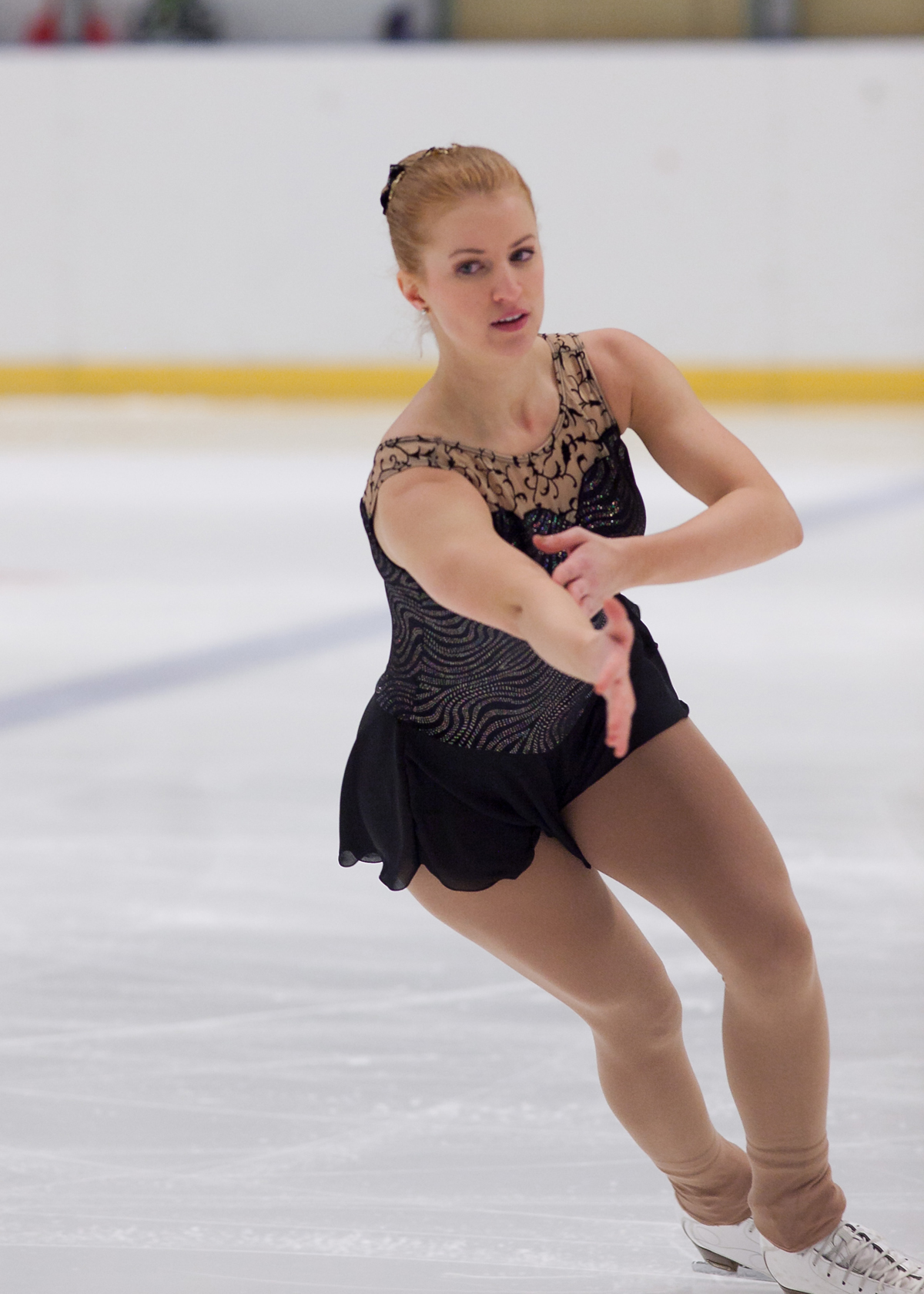
Guðbjörg Guttormsdóttir representing Iceland 2013

== Competitive highlights ==
International
Event	07–08	08–09	09–10	10–11	11–12	12–13
International
Nordics	19th J.	20th J.				12th S.
Reykjavik International Games						1st S.
National
Icelandic Championships	3rd J.				1st S.	
J. = Junior level, S. = Senior level
