= Julia Gretarsdottir =

Icelandic figure skater

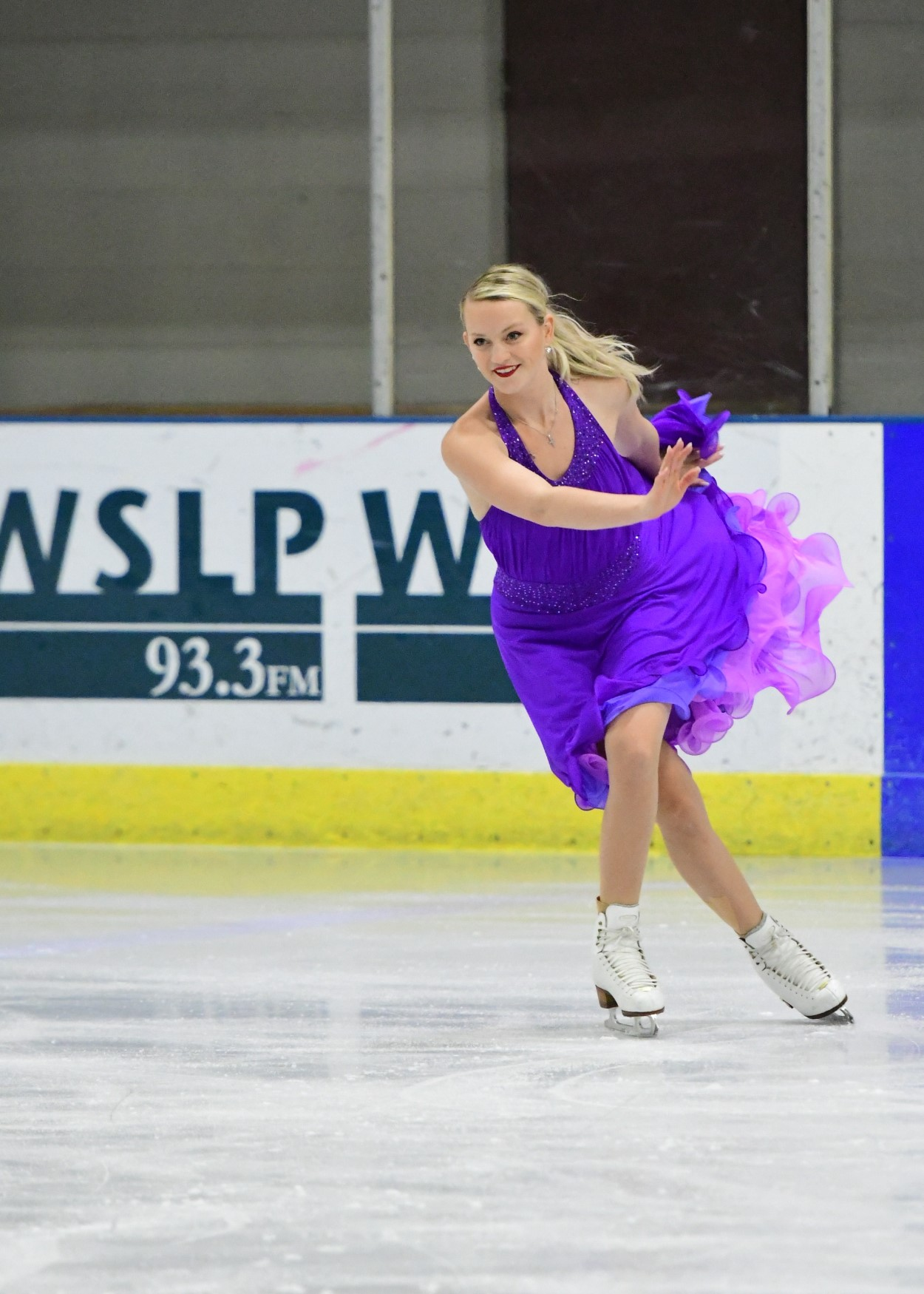
- Lake Placid 2019

Personal information
- Native name: Júlía Grétarsdóttir
- Born: July 8, 1995 (age 31) Reykjavík, Iceland
- Home town: Kópavogur
- Height: 1.67 m (5 ft 5 1/2 in)

Figure skating career
- Country: Iceland
- Coach: Aaron Lowe and Megan Wing Karyn Garossino, Clair Wileman
- Skating club: Ösp Skating Club, Vancouver Ice Academy
- Began skating: 1999

Julia Gretarsdottir (Icelandic: Júlía Grétarsdóttir; July 8, 1995) is an Icelandic figure skater. She is a five-time national medalist including 2012 junior National Champion, 2015 and 2017 senior National champion (other medals are silver in both novice and junior).

== Personal life ==
Julia Gretarsdottir was born in Reykjavík July 8, 1995. She attended Fjölbrautaskólinn í Garðabæ, majoring in sports and graduated from Menntaskólinn á Egilsstöðum. She has a NCCP1 Canskate coaching licence, is a certified ACE personal fitness trainer and graduated with Human Kinetics diploma from Capilano University in Vancouver in 2020. She has an older sister, Klara Rakel, who skated synchro.

== Career ==
Started skating at the age of 4 in Reykjavik. She has represented Björninn skating club, in Reykjavik, since 2011. In 2010 she got a vacation trip to the Vancouver Olympics from her parents and got to know coach Lorna Bauer at Vancouver Skating club. Since then she has been training in Canada, first part-time and full-time since 2014. Training at Vancouver Skating Club and was besides being coached by Lorna also coached by Rod Mackie.

Upon switching to ice dancing in 2019 she now is coached by Megan Wing and Aaron Lowe in Vancouver B.C.

=== 2010–2011 season ===
She debuted on the national team in 2010 as a Novice at international competitions at Warsaw Cup and placed 19th out of more than 30 competitors and at Nordics in 2011. She also represented the city of Reykjavik at 2011 International children´s winter games in Kelowna, Canada and placed 17th in novice category

=== 2011–2012 season ===
She had debuted as a junior at Coupe du Printemps in the previous spring and proceeded to earn a silver medal at junior Icelandic Nationals 2011 followed by another silver medal at Reykjavik International Games in 2012

=== 2012–2013 season ===
She represented Iceland JPG in Germany and set a National points record that stood unbeaten until 2017 Junior Grand Prix. In December Julia won the national junior title in 2012/2013 season. She had a 9th place finish at Sportland Trophy and a 20th place at Coupe Du printemps with the National Team.

In summer of 2013 she suffered torn ligaments in her ankle and was away from practice for 4 months being away from competition for 10 months.

=== 2015–2016 season ===
She debuted as a senior in a few Canadian competitions and set three National senior records before becoming the senior national champion of 2015/16

=== 2016–2017 season ===
She had to withdraw from 2016-17 Icelandic National Championships due to injury.

=== 2017–2018 season ===
She earned her second national champion title in December 2017 at Icelandic Nationals and was subsequently chosen to represent Iceland at Nordics in Finland in 2018. She withdrew due to injury.

=== 2018–2019 season ===
Started her season by participating in Autumn Classics International 2018. In March she decided to end her competitive single skating career and pursue ice dancing instead.

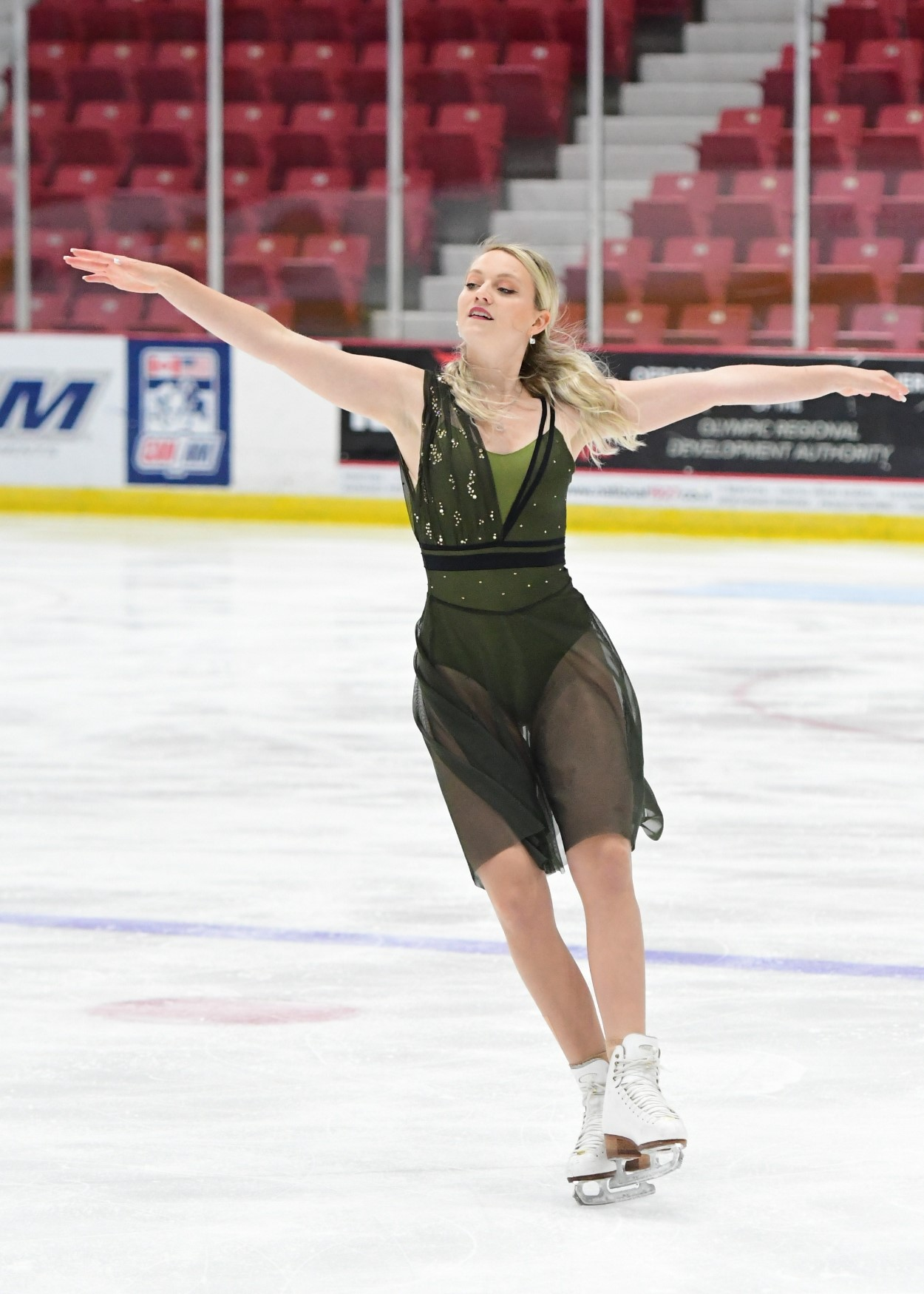
Julia in the FD at Lake Placid Dance Championships 2019

== Programs ==
Season	Short program	Free skating
2017–2019	Fallin´ by Alicia Keys	Prince of Egypt by Hans Zimmer
2015–2017	Booty Swing by Parov Stelar	Quidam by Cirque du Soleil
2014–2015	Music by Big Bad Voodoo Daddy	Addams Family by Marc Shaiman
2013–2014	Music by Big Bad Voodoo Daddy	Smells like teen spirit performed by David Garrett
2012–2013	The Feeling Begins by Peter Gabriel	James Bond Medley
2011–2012	One moment in time performed by Vanessa Mae	Debussy
2010–2011	One moment in time performed by Vanessa Mae	Fever performed by Ted Heath

== Competitive highlights ==
International
Event	11–12	12–13	13–14	14–15	15–16	16–17	17–18	18–19
CS Autumn Classic								22nd
Nordics							WD	
International: Junior
JGP Germany		22nd						
Bavarian Open				19th				
Coupe du Printemps		20th						
Kempen Trophy	15th							
Nordics		19th						
Reykjavik International	2nd		5th					
Sportland Trophy		9th						
National
Icelandic Champ.	2nd J	1st J	4th	WD	1st	WD	1st	
N. = Novice level, J. = Junior level, S. = Senior level

== Gallery ==
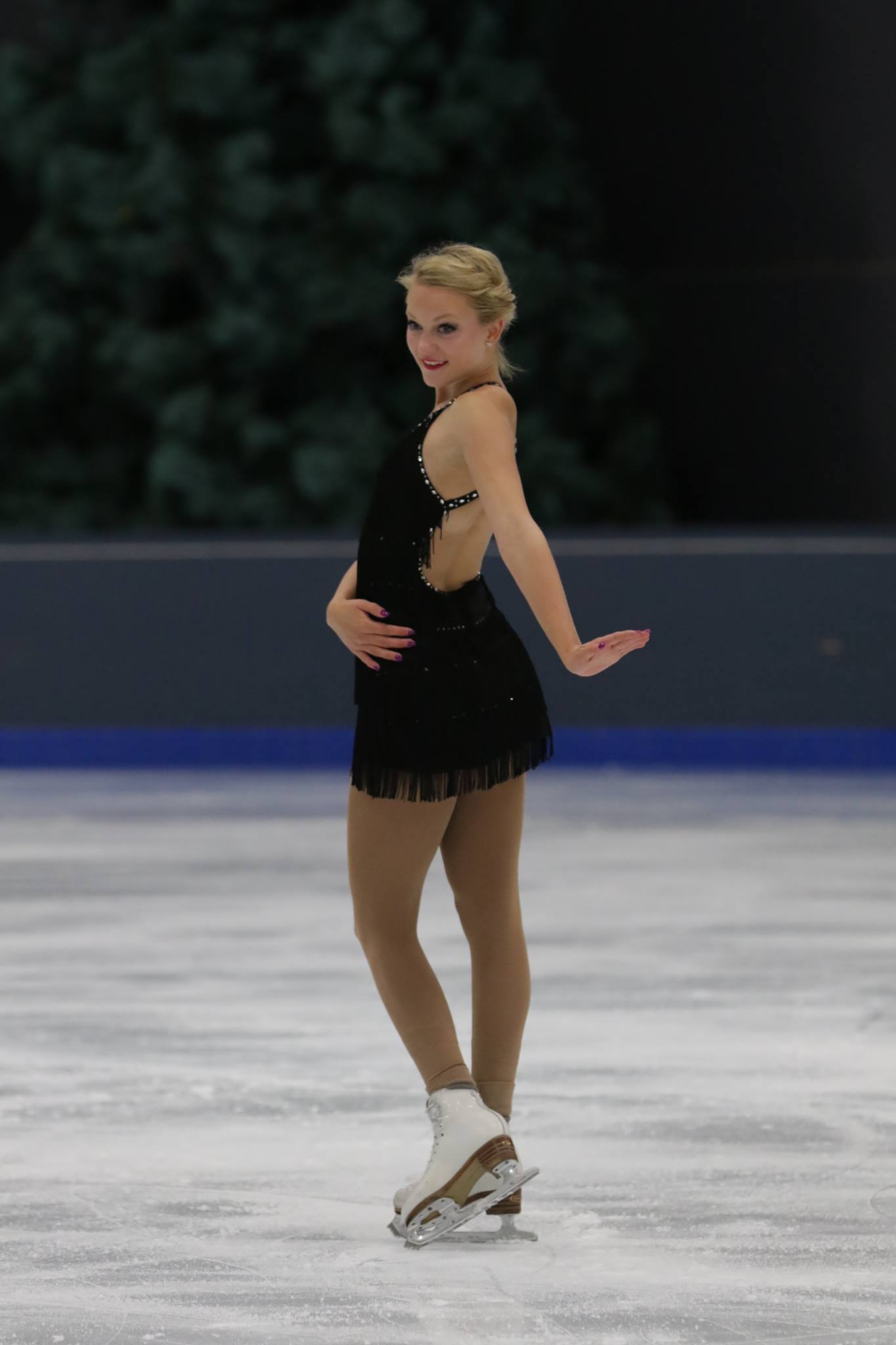
Julia Gretarsdottir during Summer Skate 2015 BC/YT

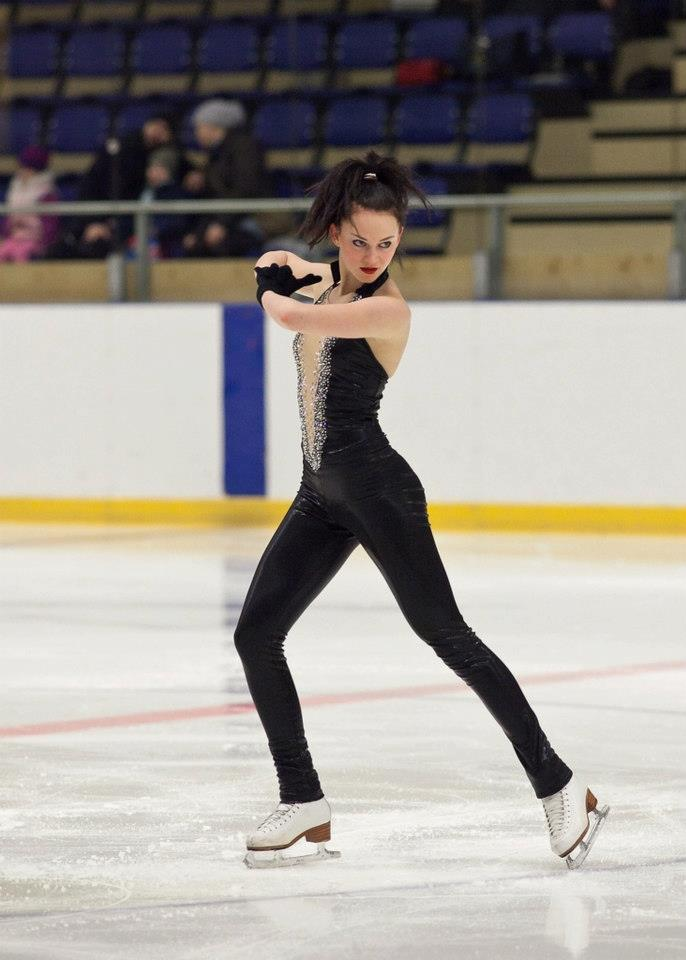
Julia Gretarsdottir at 2013 Nordics

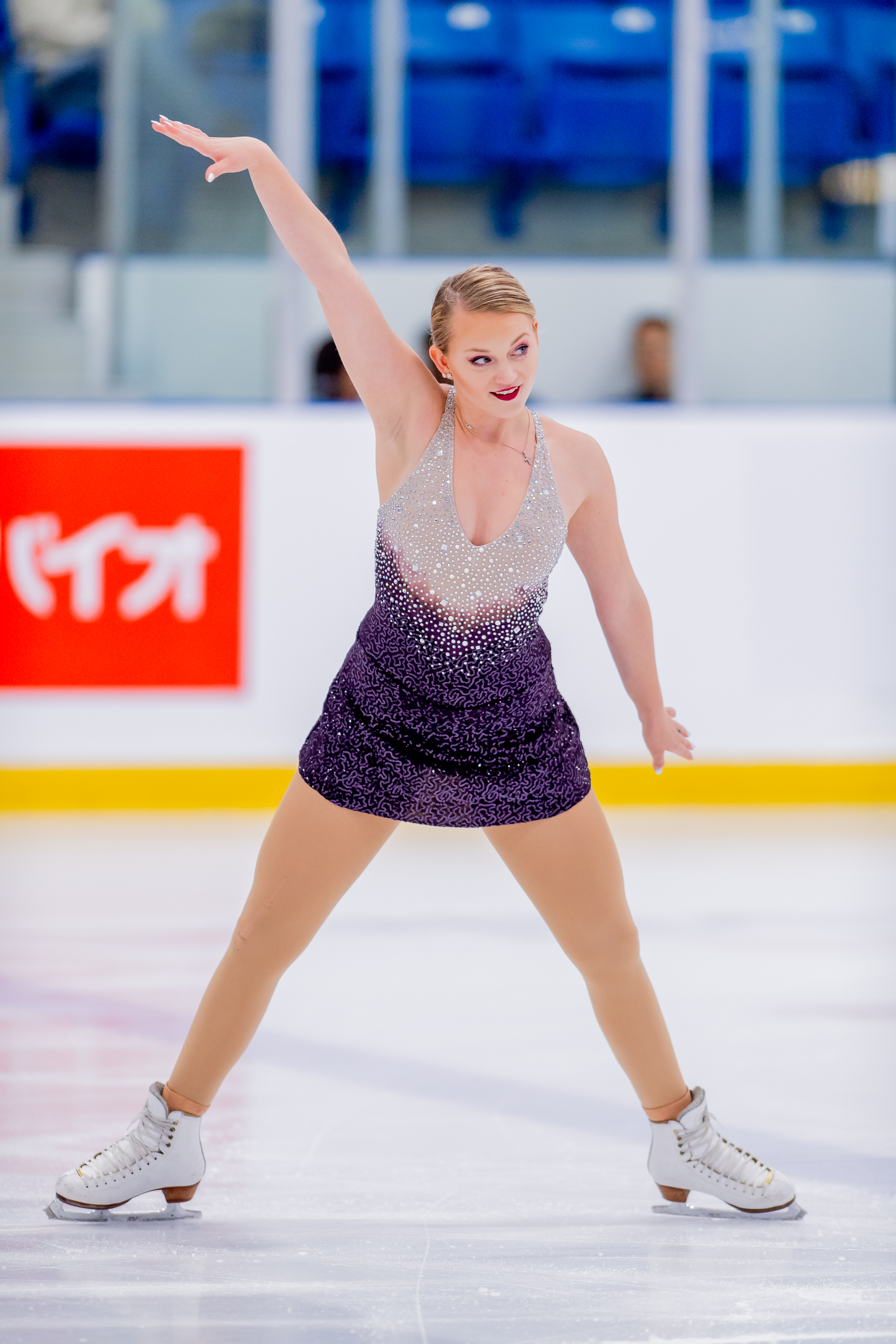
Julia Gretarsdottir at Autumn Classics Int 2018 SP

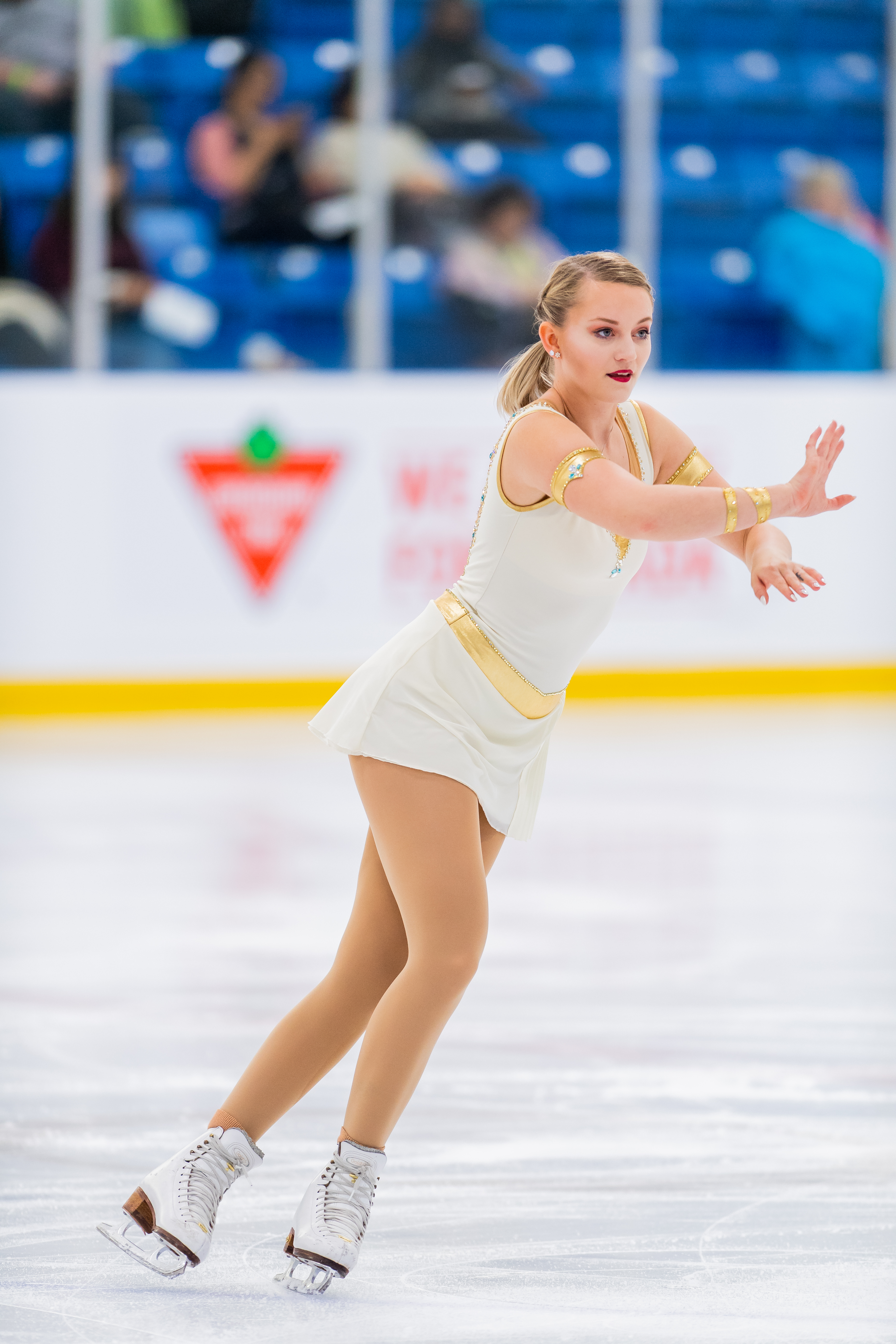
Julia Gretarsdottir at Autumn Classics Int 2018 FS

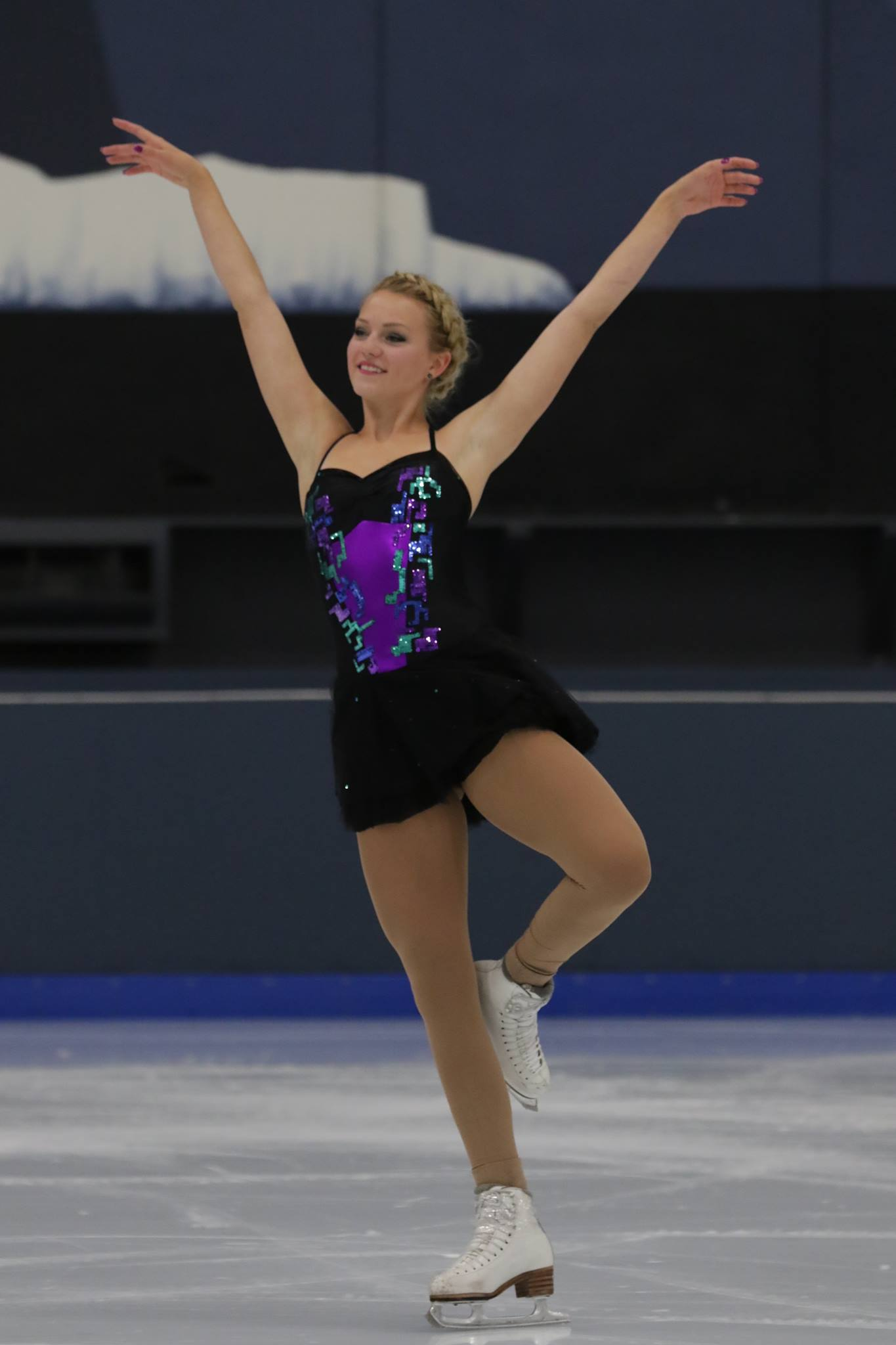
Julia Gretarsdottir FS at Summer Skate BC/YT2015

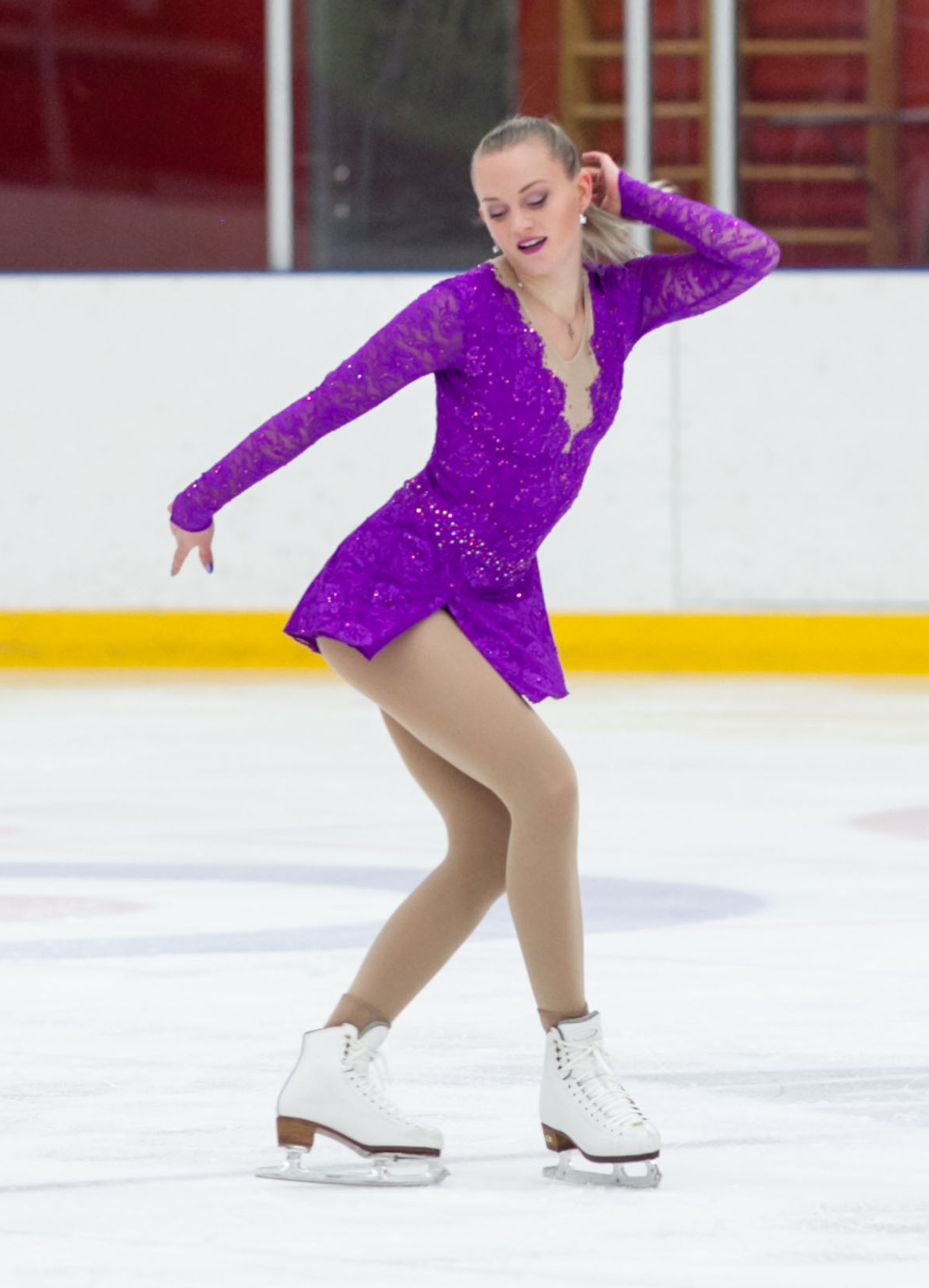
Julia Gretarsdottir at SP Icelandic Nationals 2018
