= Eva Dögg Sæmundsdóttir =

Icelandic figure skater

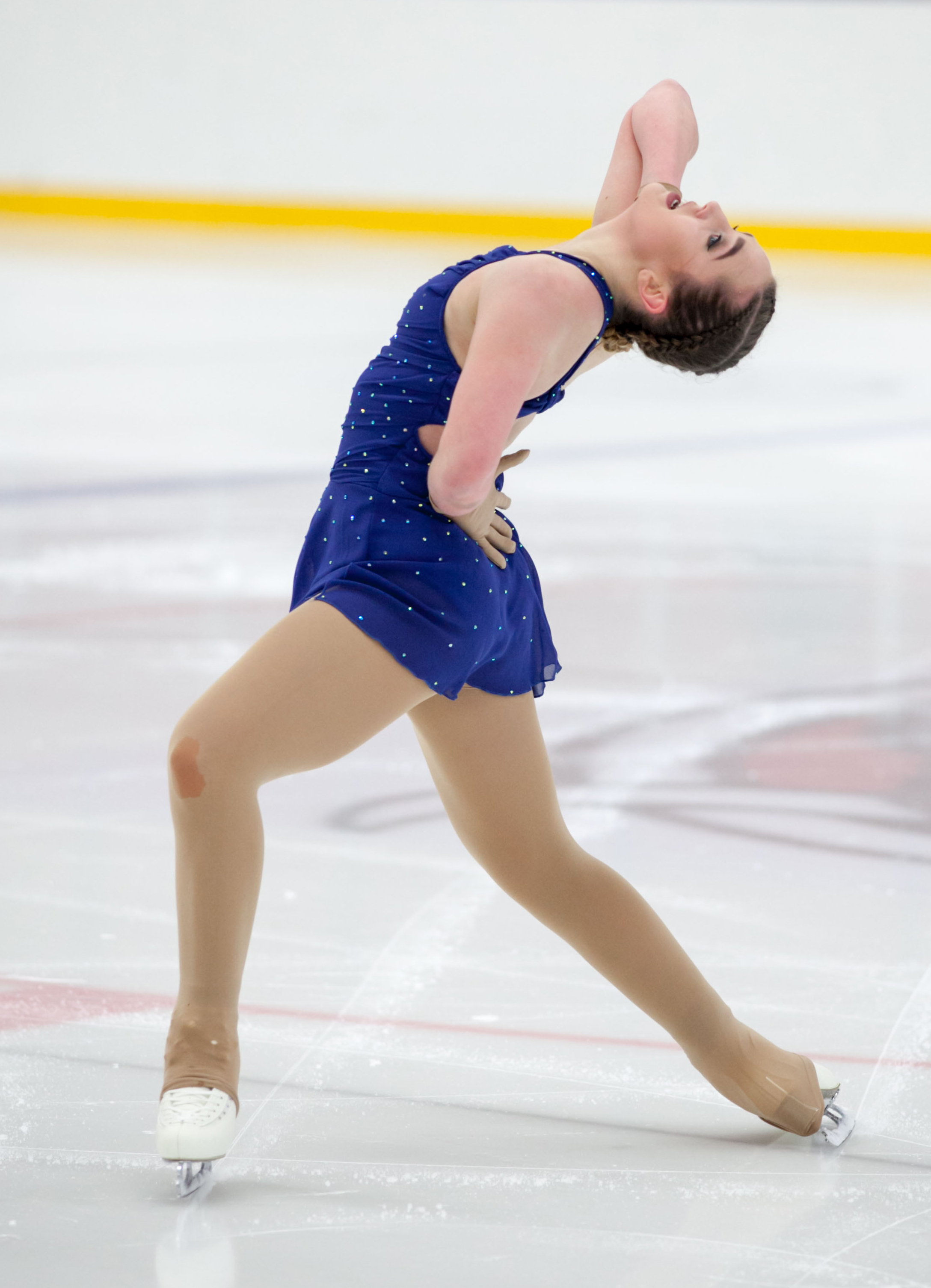

Personal information
- Born: February 27, 1998 (age 28) Reykjavík, Iceland
- Home town: Reykjavík
- Height: 1.63 m (5 ft 4 in)

Figure skating career
- Country: Iceland
- Coach: Gennady Kaskov
- Skating club: Björninn Figure Skating Club
- Began skating: 2005
- Retired: 2019

Eva Dögg Sæmundsdóttir (born February 27, 1998) is an Icelandic retired figure skater. She is the 2018 Reykjavik International bronze medalist and a two-time Icelandic national silver medalist.

== Personal life ==
Eva Dögg was born in Reykjavík February 27, 1998.

== Career ==
She is a member of Skautafélagið Björninn in Reykjavik where she started skating in 2005.

In 2014/15 she debuted on the international junior scene with a 4th-place finish at the Reykjavik International Games and placed 5th at Avas Cup in Hungary in 2015/16 and 4th at Icelandic Nationals in junior. 2016/17 season Eva Dögg placed 5th at Icelandic Nationals and 4th at Reykjavík International Games which earned her a spot for Iceland at The Nordics where she placed 12th in junior.

Eva debuted as a senior 2017/18 season. She claimed a silver medal at 2017 Icelandic National Championships and after that a bronze at Reykjavik International Games and 14th at the Nordics.

She started the 2018/19 season by being a part of first Team Iceland at Challenger series Autumn Classics in Oakland, Canada and placed 21st. She claimed silver at the 2018 Icelandic National Championships and subsequently 9th at Reykjavik International Games. She then competed at The Nordics and placed 14th and then went to the University Games in Russia where she placed 32nd and did not make the free skate. Eva Dögg is the first Icelandic skater to represent at the University Games.

Eva Dögg was Skater of the year 2018.

Eva Dögg retired from competition in 2019.

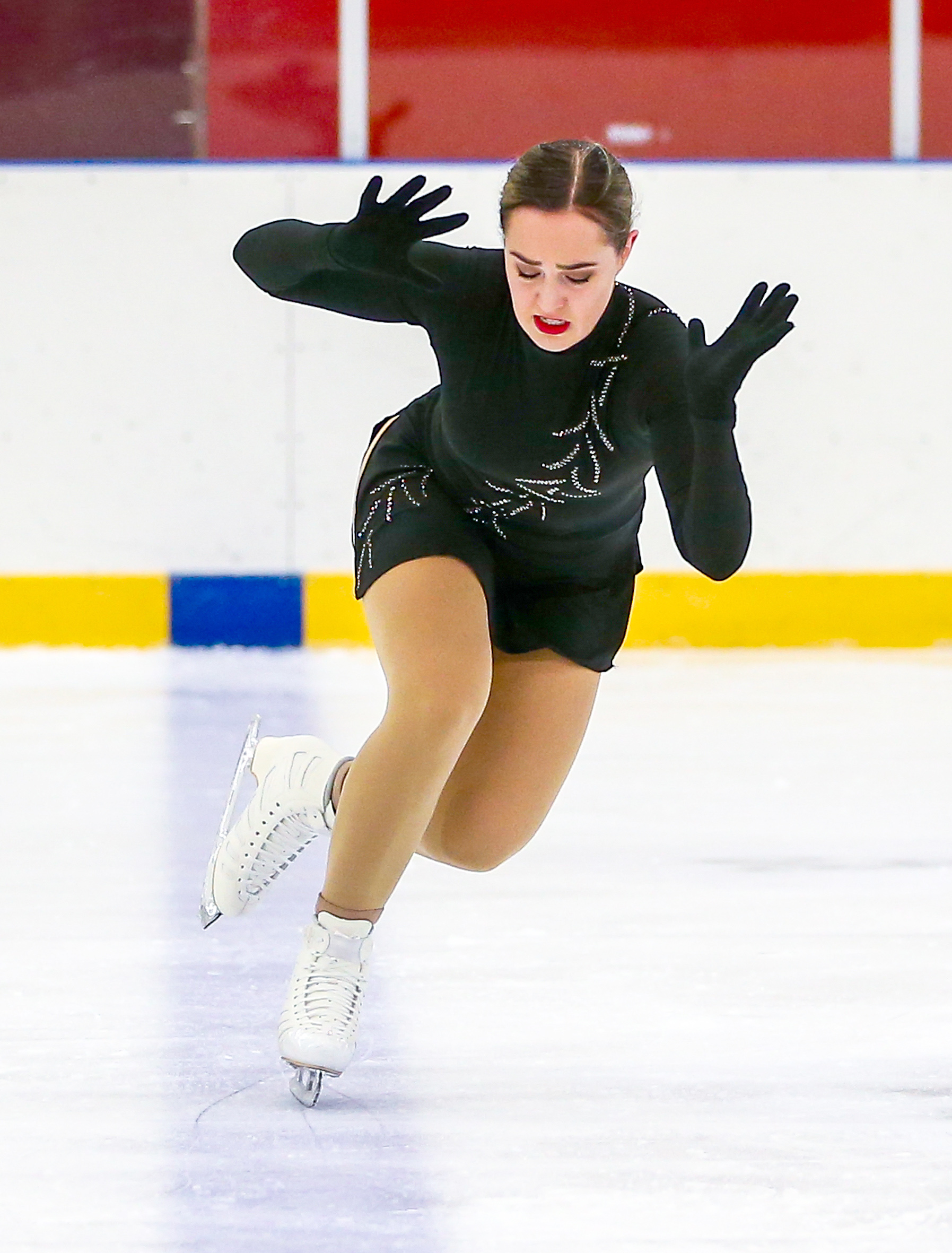
Eva Dögg Sæmundsdóttir at Icelandic Nationals 2018

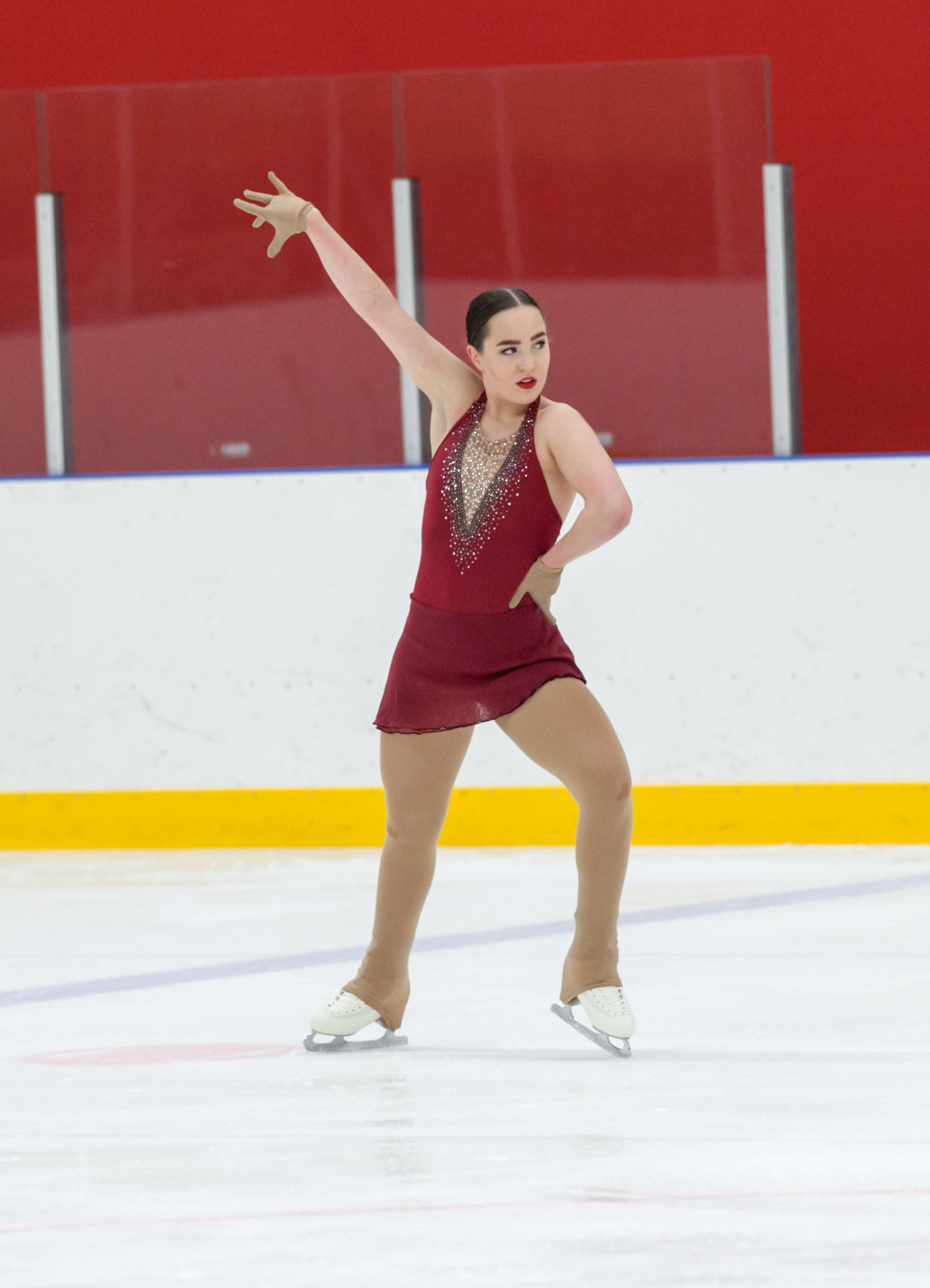
Eva Dögg short program 2017

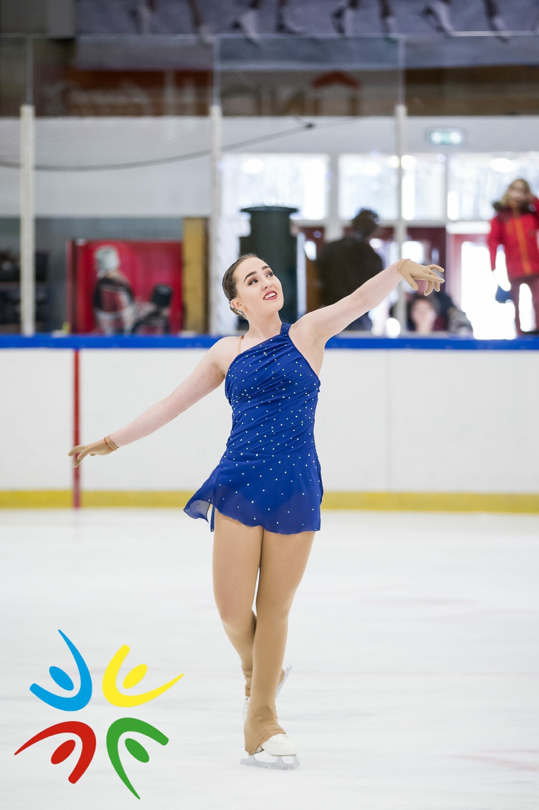
Eva Dögg Sæmundsdóttir at RIG 2017

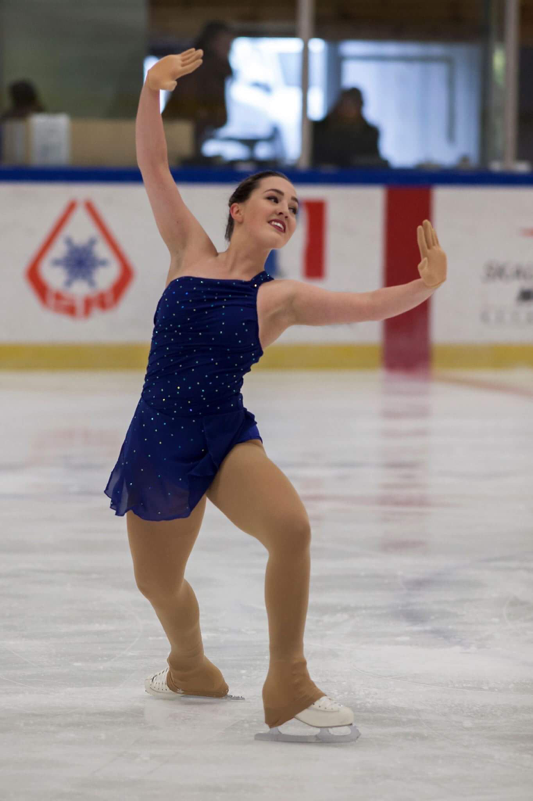
Eva Dögg Sæmundsdóttir at Reykjavik International Games 2017

== Programs ==
Season	Short program	Free skating
2018–2019	Code name Vivaldi performed by The Piano Guys	So Close/Brotsjór/3055 by Ólafur Arnalds
2017–2018	Yo Soy Maria performed by Julia Zenko	So Close/Brotsjór/3055 by Ólafur Arnalds
2016–2017	Yo Soy Maria performed by Julia Zenko	Chasing Cars performed by Cinematic Pop Orchestra and Choir
2015–2016	Kill Bill Soundtrack	Skyfall by Adele
2014–2015	Gladiator Soundtrack	Avatar Soundtrack

== Competitive highlights ==
International
Event	13–14	14–15	15–16	16–17	17–18	18–19
CS Autumn Classic						21st
Golden Bear					12th	
Nordics					14th	14th
Reykjavik International					3rd	9th
Volvo Open Cup					14th	
Winter Universiade						32nd
International: Junior
Avas Cup			5th			
Development Trophy			10th			
Hamar Trophy		15th				
Merano Cup			29th			
Nordics				12th		
Reykjavik International		4th	10th	4th		
Toruń Cup				27th		
Volvo Open Cup		34th				
National
Icelandic Champ.		6th J	4th J	5th J	2nd	2nd
J. = Junior level, S. = Senior level
