= Icelandic Figure Skating Championships =

Recurring figure skating competition

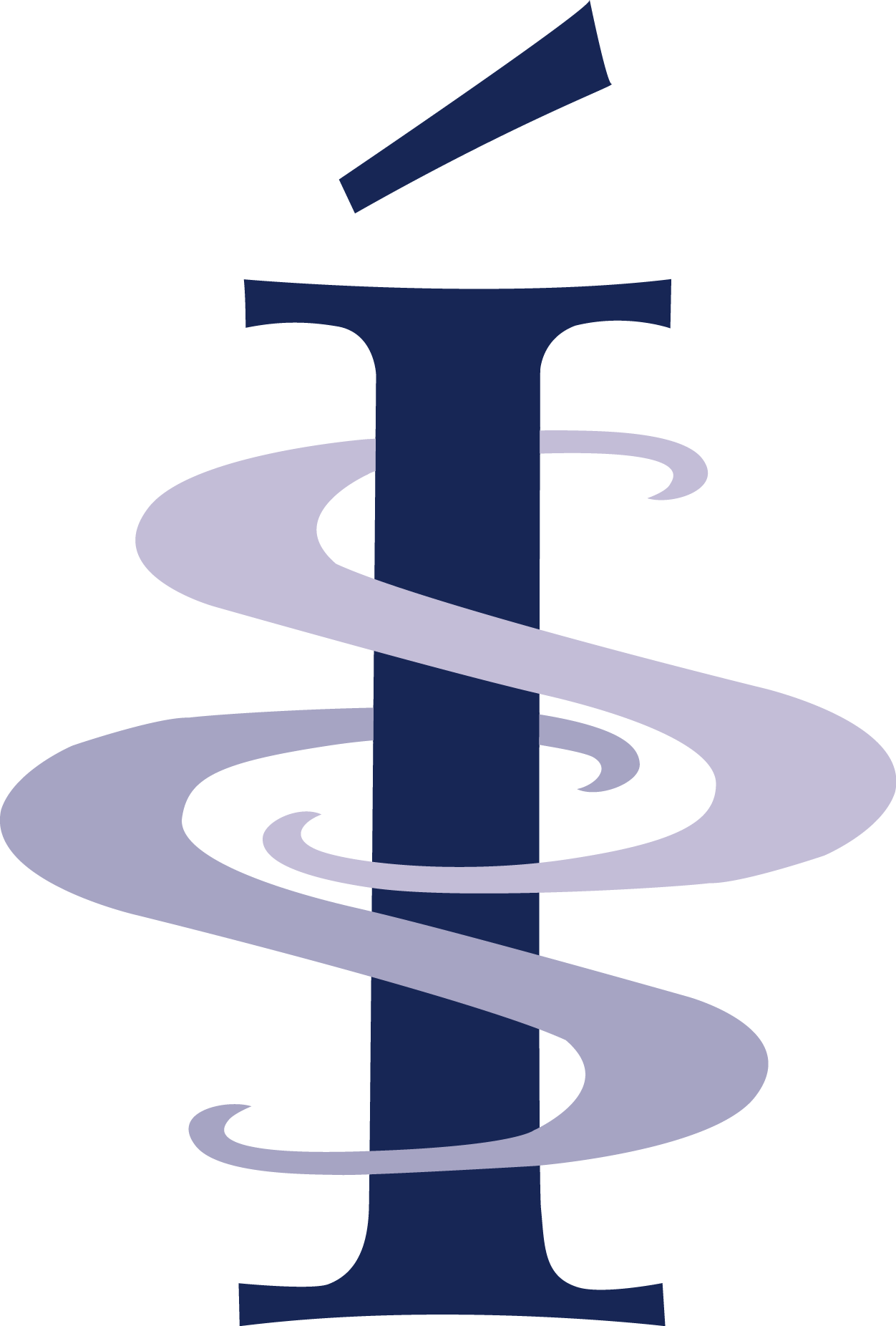
- Status: Active
- Genre: National championships
- Frequency: Annual
- Country: Iceland
- Organiser: Icelandic Skating Association

The Icelandic Figure Skating Championships (Icelandic: Íslandsmót) are the figure skating national championships held annually to crown the national champions of Iceland. Skaters compete in the disciplines of women's singles across three different levels; senior ladies, junior ladies, and advanced novice girls (no men since 1996). National Championships in synchronized skating have been held only once in 2001. Not every event has been held in every year due to a lack of entries. The National Championships are organized by the Icelandic Skating Association. The Icelandic Skating Association is a member of the ISU.

== Senior medalists ==
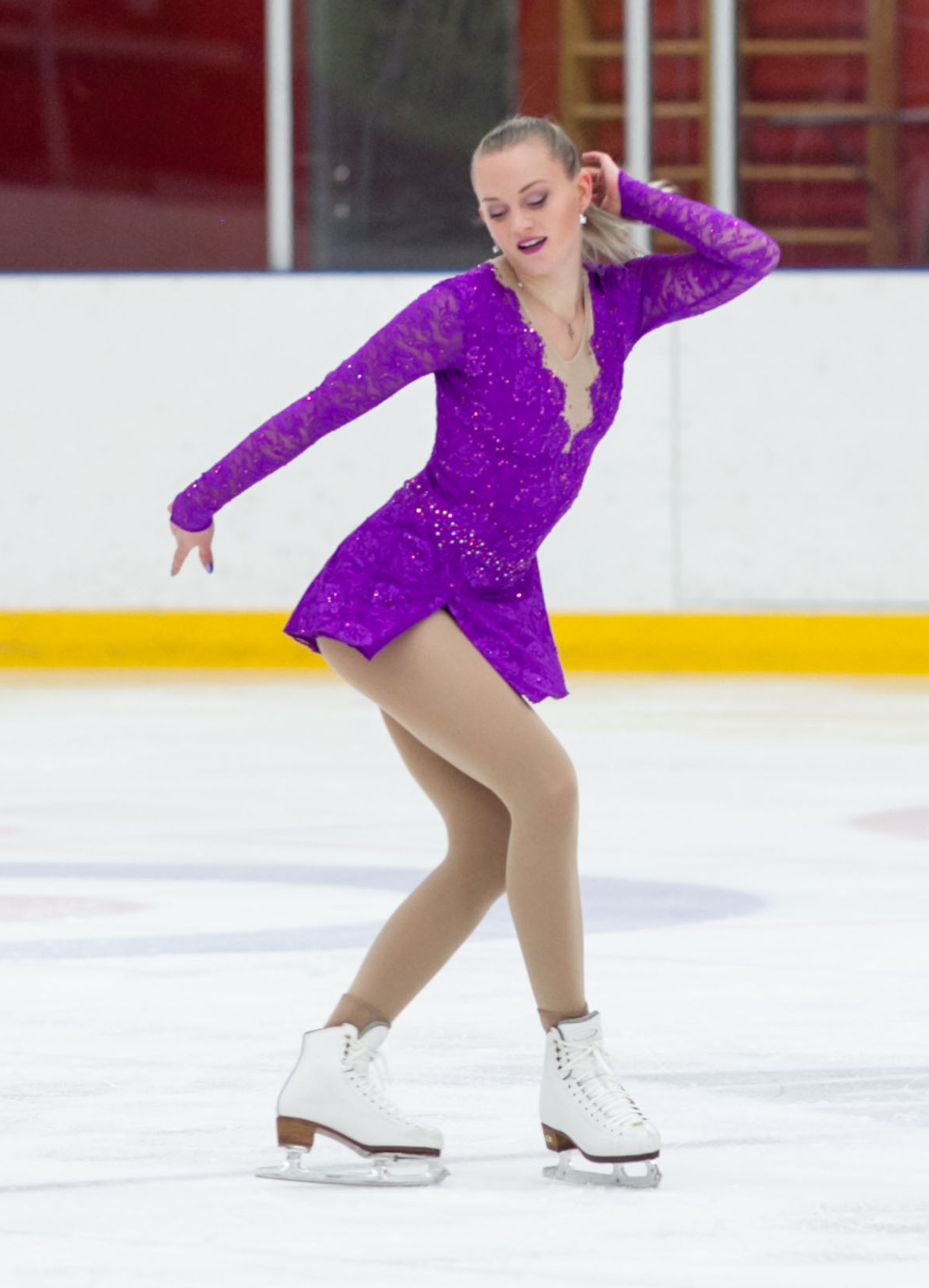
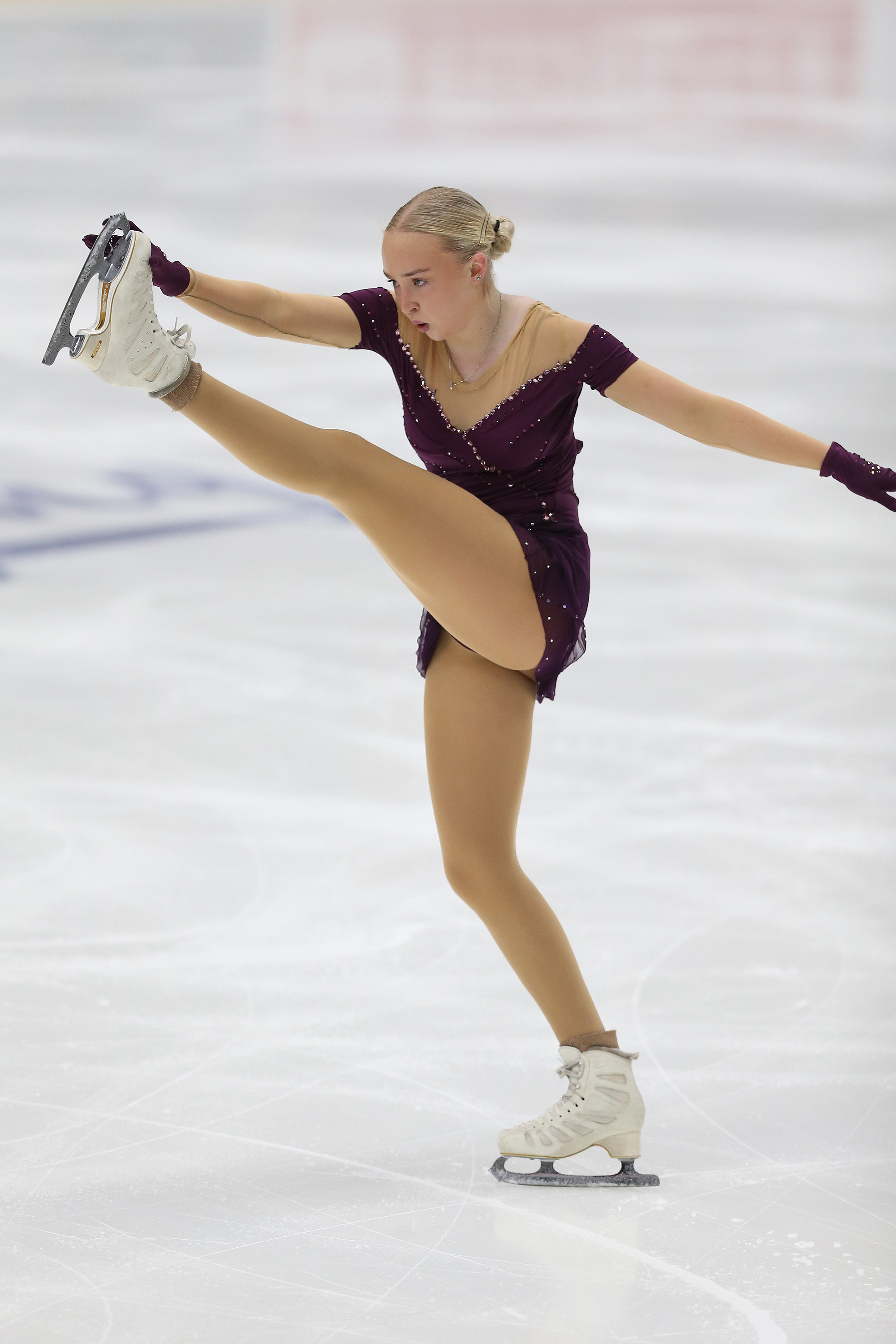
From left to right: Julia Gretarsdottir, two-time Icelandic champion in women's singles; and Aldís Kara Bergsdóttir, two-time Icelandic champion in women's singles

=== Women's singles ===
| Year | Location | Gold | Silver | Bronze | Ref. |
|---|---|---|---|---|---|
| 1996 | Reykjavík | Jóhanna Sara Kristjánsdóttir | Ólöf Ólafsdóttir | Steinvör Þöll Árnadóttir | |
| 1997 | Akureyri | Ólöf Ólafsdóttir | Rósa Ásgeirsdóttir | No other competitors | |
| 1998 | Reykjavík | Sigurlaug Árnadóttir | Snædís Lilja Ingadóttir | Linda Viðarsdóttir | |
| 1999 | Akureyri | Sigurlaug Árnadóttir | Linda Viðarsdóttir | Snædís Lilja Ingadóttir | |
| 2000 | Akureyri | Sigurlaug Árnadóttir | Linda Viðarsdóttir | Snædís Lilja Ingadóttir | |
| 2001 | Reykjavík | Sigurlaug Árnadóttir | Linda Viðarsdóttir | No other competitors | |
| 2002 | Reykjavík | Sigurlaug Árnadóttir | No other competitors | | |
| 2003 | Reykjavík | No competitors | | | |
| 2004 | Reykjavík | No competitors | | | |
| 2005 | Reykjavík | No competitors | | | |
| 2006 | Akureyri | No competitors | | | |
| 2007 | Reykjavík | No competitors | | | |
| 2008 | Reykjavík | Audrey Freyja Clarke | No other competitors | | |
| 2009 | Reykjavík | No competitors | | | |
| 2010 | Reykjavík | No competitors | | | |
| 2011 | Akureyri | No competitors | | | |
| 2012 | Reykjavík | Guðbjörg Guttormsdóttir | No other competitors | | |
| 2013 | Reykjavík | No competitors | | | |
| 2014 | Akureyri | Nadia Margrét Jamchi | No other competitors | | |
| 2015 | Reykjavík | Júlía Grétarsdóttir | No other competitors | | |
| 2016 | Reykjavík | No competitors | | | |
| 2017 | Akureyri | Júlía Grétarsdóttir | Eva Dögg Sæmundsdóttir | No other competitors | |
| 2018 | Reykjavík | Margrét Sól Torfadóttir | Eva Dögg Sæmundsdóttir | No other competitors | |
| 2019 | Reykjavík | No competitors | | | |
| 2020 | Reykjavík | Aldís Kara Bergsdóttir | No other competitors | | |
| 2021 | Reykjavík | Aldís Kara Bergsdóttir | No other competitors | | |
| 2022 | Reykjavík | No competitors | | | |
| 2023 | Akureyri | Júlía Sylvía Gunnarsdóttir | No other competitors | | |
| 2024 | Reykjavík | Lena Rut Ásgeirsdóttir | No other competitors | | |
| 2025 | Reykjavík | Lena Rut Ásgeirsdóttir | No other competitors | | |

=== Pairs ===
| Year | Location | Gold | Silver | Bronze | Ref. |
|---|---|---|---|---|---|
| 2024 | Reykjavík | Júlía Sylvía Gunnarsdóttir / Manuel Piazza | No other competitors | | |
| 2025 | Reykjavík | Júlía Sylvía Gunnarsdóttir / Manuel Piazza | No other competitors | | |

=== Synchronized skating ===
| Year | Location | Gold | Silver | Bronze | Ref. |
|---|---|---|---|---|---|
| 2001 | Reykjavík | Ice Cubes | No other competitors | | |

== Junior medalists ==
=== Women's singles ===
| Year | Location | Gold | Silver | Bronze | Ref. |
|---|---|---|---|---|---|
| 1996 | Reykjavík | Linda Viðarsdóttir | Anný Rut Hauksdóttir | Sigrún Þ. Runólfsdóttir | |
| 1997 | Akureyri | Linda Viðarsdóttir | Snædís Lilja Ingadóttir | Svanhildur Hafliðadóttir | |
| 1998 | Reykjavík | Berglind Rós Einarsdóttir | Heiða Björg Jóhannsdóttir | Ragna Björk Guðbrandsdóttir | |
| 1999 | Reykjavík | Heiða Björg Jóhannsdóttir | Inga Fanney Gunnarsdóttir | Berglind Rós Einarsdóttir | |
| 2000 | Akureyri | Berglind Rós Einarsdóttir | Ágústa Björg Bergsveinsdóttir | Helga Margrét Clarke | |
| 2001 | Reykjavík | Helga Margrét Clarke | Halla Karí Hjaltested | Sara Helgadóttir | |
| 2002 | Reykjavík | Audrey Freyja Clarke | Vanessa Jóhannsdóttir | Helga Margrét Clarke | |
| 2003 | Reykjavík | Audrey Freyja Clarke | Hildur Ómarsdóttir | Katrín Björgvinsdóttir | |
| 2004 | Reykjavík | Audrey Freyja Clarke | Hildur Ómarsdóttir | Ásdís Rós Clark | |
| 2005 | Reykjavík | Audrey Freyja Clarke | Íris Kara Heiðarsdóttir | Ásdís Rós Clark | |
| 2006 | Akureyri | Íris Kara Heiðarsdóttir | Ásdís Rós Clark | Hildur Ómarsdóttir | |
| 2007 | Reykjavík | Audrey Freyja Clarke | Íris Kara Heiðarsdóttir | Hildur Ómarsdóttir | |
| 2008 | Reykjavík | Íris Kara Heiðarsdóttir | Dana Rut Gunnarsdóttir | Guðbjörg Guttormsdóttir | |
| 2009 | Reykjavík | Dana Rut Gunnarsdóttir | Nadia Margrét Jamchi | Heiða Ósk Gunnarsdóttir | |
| 2010 | Reykjavík | Nadia Margrét Jamchi | No other competitors | | |
| 2011 | Akureyri | Heiðbjört Arney Höskuldsdóttir | Júlía Grétarsdóttir | Nadia Margrét Jamchi | |
| 2012 | Reykjavík | Júlía Grétarsdóttir | Vala Rún B. Magnúsdóttir | Nadia Margrét Jamchi | |
| 2013 | Reykjavík | Vala Rún B. Magnúsdóttir | Hrafnhildur Ósk Birgisdóttir | Agnes Dís Brynjarsdóttir | |
| 2014 | Akureyri | Agnes Dís Brynjarsdóttir | Vala Rún B. Magnúsdóttir | Þuríður Björg Björgvinsdóttir | |
| 2015 | Reykjavík | Emilía Rós Ómarsdóttir | Agnes Dís Brynjarsdóttir | Kristín Valdís Örnólfsdóttir | |
| 2016 | Reykjavík | Kristín Valdís Örnólfsdóttir | Agnes Dís Brynjarsdóttir | Margrét Sól Torfadóttir | |
| 2017 | Akureyri | Marta María Jóhannsdóttir | Kristín Valdís Örnólfsdóttir | Herdís Birna Hjaltalín | |
| 2018 | Reykjavík | Marta María Jóhannsdóttir | Aldís Kara Bergsdóttir | Viktoría Lind Björnsdóttir | |
| 2019 | Reykjavík | Aldís Kara Bergsdóttir | Viktoría Lind Björnsdóttir | Herdís Birna Hjaltalín | |
| 2020 | Reykjavík | Júlía Rós Viðarsdóttir | Júlía Sylvía Gunnarsdóttir | Eydís Gunnarsdóttir | |
| 2021 | Reykjavík | Júlía Rós Viðarsdóttir | Júlía Sylvía Gunnarsdóttir | Lena Rut Ásgeirsdóttir | |
| 2022 | Reykjavík | Júlía Sylvía Gunnarsdóttir | Freydís Jóna Jing Bergsveinsdóttir | Lena Rut Ásgeirsdóttir | |
| 2023 | Akureyri | Lena Rut Ásgeirsdóttir | Freydís Jóna Jing Bergsveinsdóttir | Dharma Elísabet Tómasdóttir | |
| 2024 | Reykjavík | Sædís Heba Guðmundsóttir | Dharma Elísabet Tómasdóttir | No other competitors | |
| 2025 | Reykjavík | No competitors | | | |

=== Synchronized skating ===
| Year | Location | Gold | Silver | Bronze | Ref. |
|---|---|---|---|---|---|
| 2001 | Reykjavík | Kristallar | Eldingarnar | No other competitors | |
