= Audrey Freyja Clarke =

Icelandic figure skater

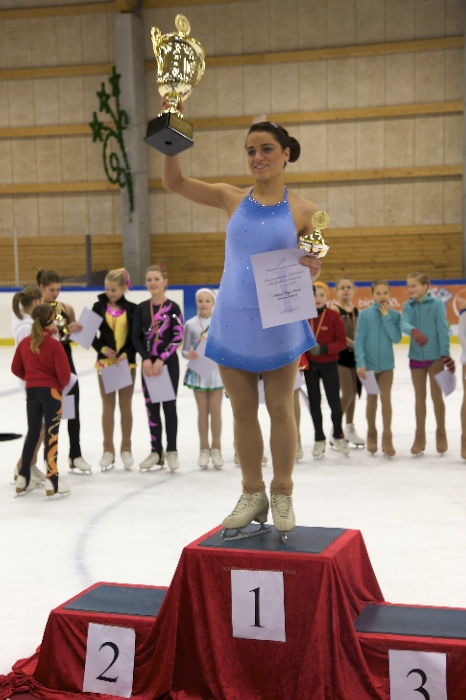
- Audrey Freyja Clarke, National Champion 2008

Personal information
- Full name: Audrey Freyja Clarke
- Born: December 13, 1987 (age 38)
- Home town: Akureyri, Iceland
- Height: 1.58 m (5 ft 2 in)

Figure skating career
- Country: Iceland
- Coach: Iveta Reitmeyerova, Helga Margrét Clarke
- Skating club: Akureyri Skating Club
- Began skating: 1997
- Retired: 2011

Audrey Freyja Clarke (born 13 December 1987) is a retired Icelandic figure skater. She is a multiple Icelandic National Champion where her reign lasted eight years only missing out one year where she did not compete.

== Personal life ==
Audrey Freyja Clarke was born December 13, 1987, in Akureyri, Iceland, as the youngest of three sisters. Her sister Helga Margrét Clarke also skated and was the 2001 junior national champion and later coached.

The sisters, Audrey Freyja and Helga Margrét, formed a musical duet called Sister Sister which was active in 2013-2015 and released one CD where Audrey Freyja was the lead singer and Helga Margrét played piano and sang. Audrey Freyja was also a contestant on the Icelandic version of The Voice in 2015.

In 2011 she graduated as a physical therapist from the University of Iceland.

She was the national Curling champion in 2004 with Ísmeistarar from Akureyri.

== Career ==
Audrey Freyja started skating at the age of 10 in Akureyri and was early on coached by Leena-Kaisa Viitanen (Mimmi) and Sanna-Maija Wiksten, and later by Iveta Reitmeyerova. During the summer months she trained in Nottingham, England, and in Belfast, Northern Ireland with Margaret O´Neill. Audrey was also coached for several years by her sister Helga Margrét.

She was the second skater to represent Iceland at ISU Junior Grand Prix series and placed 35th at the 2005–2006 ISU Junior Grand Prix event in Gdańsk, Poland.

She represented Iceland at five Nordic Championships in junior from 2003-2007 with her best placement being 16th in 2007.

She was the first senior skater in 2009 to represent Iceland at the Reykjavík International Games where she earned silver.

She was elected skater of the year five times for the years 2003-2007 by the Icelandic Skating Association and is the skater who has earned the title most often.

== Programs ==
Season	Short program	Free skating
2003–2004	Supernatural´ by Santana	Piano Concerto no.2 op18 by Sergei Rachmaninoff
2004–2006	October Sky by Mark Isham; Schindler´s List by John Williams	
2006–2008	Clair de Lune by Claude Debussy	
2008–2009	Toccata Performed by Vanessa-Mae	Performed by Yanni

== Competitive highlights ==
Event	02–03	03–04	04–05	05–06	06–07	07–08	08–09
International
Reykjavík International Games							2nd
International: Junior
JGP Poland				35th			
the Nordics	20th	21st	20th	19th	16th		
National
Icelandic Champ.	1st J	1st J	1st J	1st J		1st J	1st S.

== Gallery ==
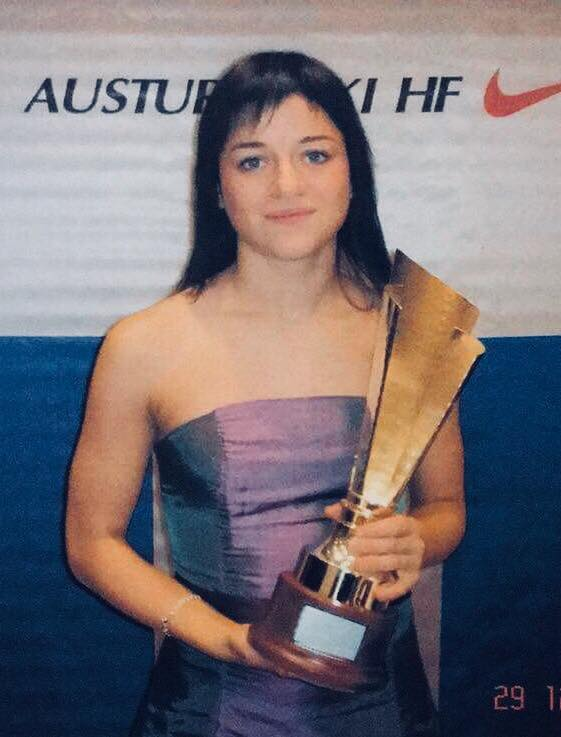
Audrey Freyja Clarke Skater of the year 2007
