= Icelandic Skating Association =

Figure skating governing body in Iceland

- Skautasamband Íslands
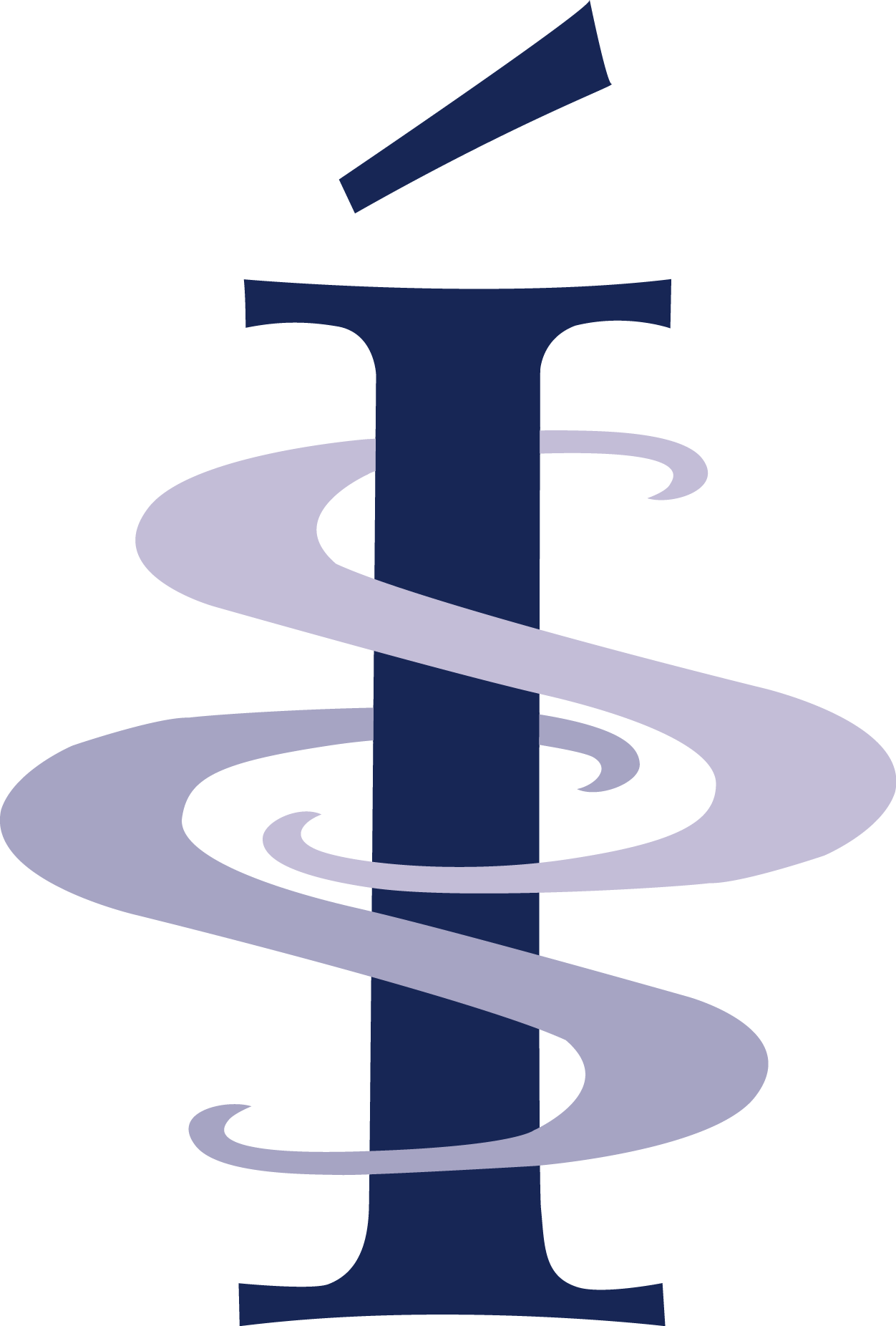
- Sport: Figure skating
- Abbreviation: ÍSS
- Founded: 1995
- Affiliation: International Skating Union
- Affiliation date: 2002
- Headquarters: Reykjavík
- President: Svava Hróðný Jónsdóttir
- Secretary: María Fortescue

Official website
- iceskate.is
- (Iceland)

The Icelandic Skating Association (Icelandic: Skautasamband Íslands, ÍSS) is the national association for figure skating in Iceland.

The ÍSS has its origins in the Icelandic Skating Association, which was formed in 1995 as an umbrella association for both figure skating and Ice hockey. In 2004, it was divided into Skautasamband Ísland for figure skating and Íshokkísamband Íslands for ice hockey.

The Icelandic Skating Association is a member federation of the International Skating Union. The association's headquarters are currently in Reykjavík.

== Former presidents ==
Presidents of the joint Figure Skating and Ice Hockey Association active 1995-2004:

- 1995–1996 Hannes Sigurjónsson
- 1996–1997 Marjo Kristinsson
- 1997–2004 Elísabet Eyjólfsdóttir

Presidents of Icelandic Figure Skating Association 2004–present:

- 2004–2007 Elísabet Eyjólfsdóttir
- 2007–2012 June Eva Clark
- 2012–2014 Björgvin Ingvar Ormarsson
- 2014–2016 Margrét Jamchi Ólafsdóttir
- 2016–2020 Guðbjört Erlendsdóttir
- 2020–present Svava Hróðný Jónsdóttir

== See also ==
- Icelandic Figure Skating Championships
