= Reykjavik International Games =

Annual multi-sports event in Iceland

The Reykjavik International Games (RIG) are an annual multi-sport event taking place in late-January/early-February in Reykjavík, Iceland.

== History ==
They are held in the Reykjavík districts, and there are sports facilities such as a main stadium, pool and skating rink in the district where each competition is held. They were first held in 2007 as an international competition for athletics and swimming, and have been held in January every year since then. As of 2016, 22 events took place.

== Editions ==
1. 2008 Reykjavik International Games
2. 2009 Reykjavik International Games
3. 2010 Reykjavik International Games
4. 2011 Reykjavik International Games
5. 2012 Reykjavik International Games
6. 2013 Reykjavik International Games
7. 2014 Reykjavik International Games
8. 2015 Reykjavik International Games
9. 2016 Reykjavik International Games
10. 2017 Reykjavik International Games
11. 2018 Reykjavik International Games
12. 2019 Reykjavik International Games
13. 2020 Reykjavik International Games
14. 2021 Reykjavik International Games
15. 2022 Reykjavik International Games - January 29th and until February 6th 2022, in Reykjavík, Iceland. 15th Reykjavik International Games 2022. 3000 participants - 45 countries.

== Sports ==
The following sports are part of the program:

- Athletics
- Archery
- Artistic gymnastics
- Badminton
- Bowling
- Cycling
- Dancesport
- Fencing
- Figure skating
- Judo
- Karate
- Olympic weightlifting
- Powerlifting
- Shooting
- Squash
- Swimming
- Table tennis
