= Sara Hurtado =

Spanish ice dancer

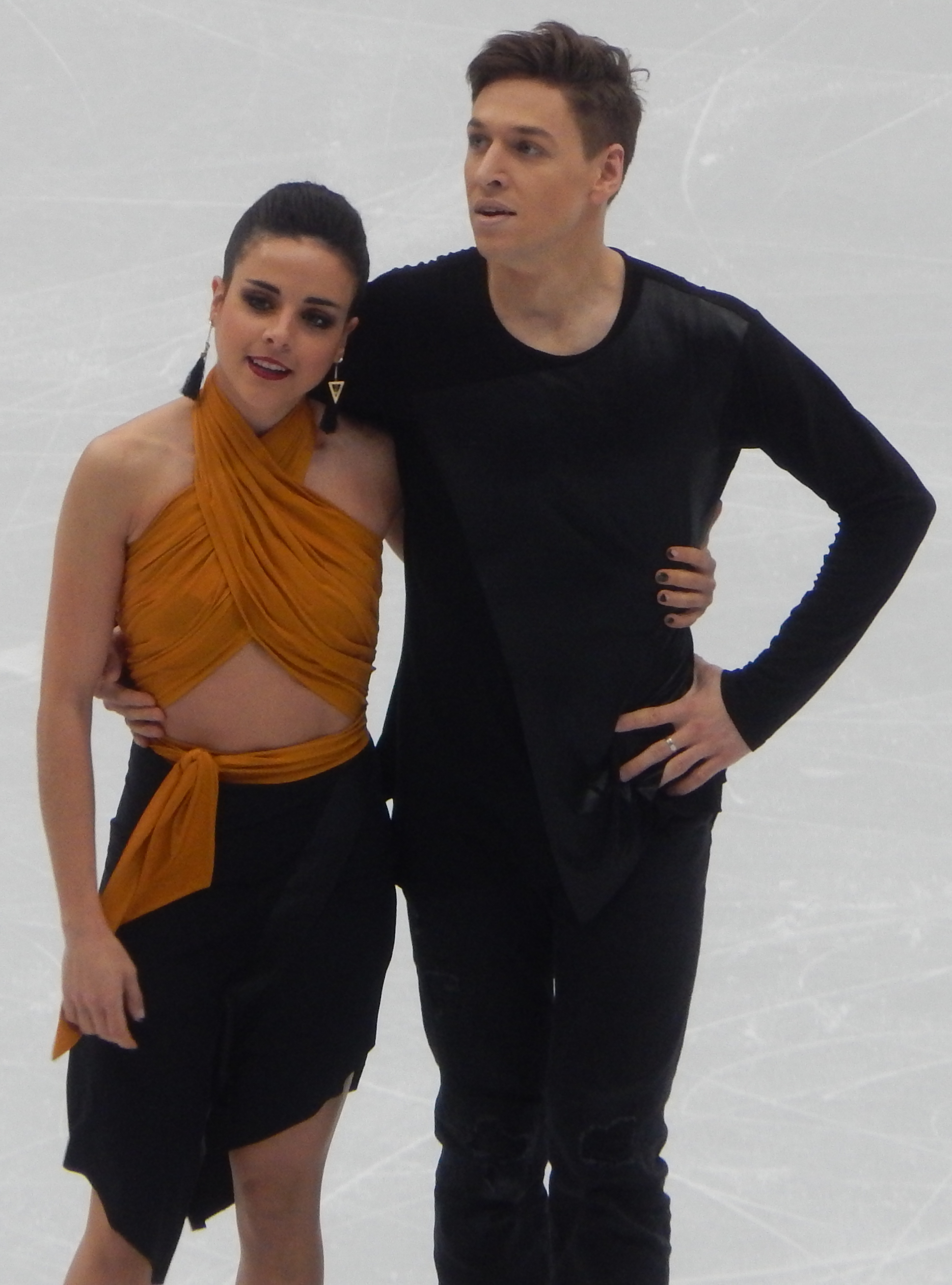
- Sara Hurtado and Kirill Khaliavin at the 2018 European Championships

Personal information
- Full name: Sara Hurtado Martín
- Born: 3 November 1992 (age 33) Madrid, Spain
- Height: 1.60 m (5 ft 3 in)

Figure skating career
- Country: Spain
- Discipline: Ice dance
- Partner: Kirill Khaliavin (2016–22); Adrián Díaz (2008–15)
- Began skating: 2001
- Retired: 2022

Medal record
Spanish Championships
Gold medal – first place	2009 Logroño	Ice dance
Gold medal – first place	2012 Jaca	Ice dance
Gold medal – first place	2013 Majadahonda	Ice dance
Gold medal – first place	2014 Jaca	Ice dance
Gold medal – first place	2015 Granada	Ice dance
Gold medal – first place	2017 Vielha	Ice dance
Gold medal – first place	2019 Logroño	Ice dance
Silver medal – second place	2018 Jaca	Ice dance
Silver medal – second place	2020 San Sebastián	Ice dance
Silver medal – second place	2022 Jaca	Ice dance

Sara Hurtado Martín (born 3 November 1992) is a Spanish retired ice dancer. Initially rising to prominence on the international scene partnered with Adrián Díaz, the duo won six senior international medals and five Spanish national titles, and were the first dance team to represent Spain in ISU competition. They qualified for the Olympic Games, finishing thirteenth at the 2014 Winter Olympics in Sochi, and achieving their best ISU Championship result when they placed fifth at the 2015 European Championships.

Following the end of her partnership with Díaz, she formed a new partnership with Russian ice dancer Kirill Khaliavin, with whom she was the 2018 Rostelecom Cup silver medalist and 2017 and 2019 Spanish national champion. The two placed twelfth at the 2018 Winter Olympics and were the first Spanish ice dancers to stand on a Grand Prix podium.

== Personal life ==
Sara Hurtado was born 3 November 1992 in Madrid. She studied journalism at Universidad Francisco de Vitoria before moving to Canada. In 2016, she enrolled at the British School of Art and Design in Moscow.

== Skating career ==
=== Early years ===
Hurtado began skating in 2001. Her mother signed her up for lessons when an ice rink opened nearby. She competed in singles but became interested in switching to ice dancing in 2006, when Adrián Díaz asked her to attend a summer camp organized by the Spanish federation (FEDH) with French coach Romain Haguenauer. Hurtado said, "We begged the Federation for two years, please, please, we want to do ice dance." In early 2008, FEDH hired British coach John Dunn to teach ice dancing in Madrid.

=== 2008–2009 season: Debut of Hurtado/Díaz ===
Hurtado/Díaz began competing together internationally in the 2008–09 season. Their first major international event was the 2009 World Junior Championships in Sofia, Bulgaria, where they finished 32nd.

=== 2009–2010 season ===
Hurtado/Díaz competed in two events on the Junior Grand Prix circuit and finished sixteenth at the 2010 World Junior Championships in The Hague, Netherlands.

=== 2010–2011 season ===
Hurtado/Díaz competed on the Junior Grand Prix circuit, while also taking part in several senior internationals. They finished fifteenth at the 2011 European Championships in Bern, Switzerland, won a bronze medal at the Bavarian Open, and finished fourth at the Winter Universiade.

They placed ninth at the World Junior Championships in Gangneung, South Korea. They then competed in Moscow, Russia, at their first senior World Championships; although the two qualified for the short dance out of the preliminary round, they were unable to reach the free dance portion of the event.

=== 2011–2012 season ===
Hurtado/Díaz moved to London, England, in mid-2011 after Dunn accepted a coaching job in his native country. In November, they competed at their first-ever Grand Prix event, the 2011 Trophée Éric Bompard, where they placed 8th (last). In December 2011, they ended their relationship with Dunn and relocated to Montreal, Quebec, Canada, to train under Marie-France Dubreuil and Patrice Lauzon.

Ranked twelfth in the short dance and seventeenth in the free dance, Hurtado/Díaz finished sixteenth at the 2012 European Championships in Sheffield, England. They qualified to the free dance at the 2012 World Championships in Nice, France, and finished nineteenth overall.

=== 2012–2013 season ===
Hurtado/Díaz did not compete on the Grand Prix series. They placed 15th at the 2013 European Championships in Zagreb, Croatia, and nineteenth at the 2013 World Championships in London, Ontario, Canada.

=== 2013–2014 season: Sochi Olympics ===
At the 2013 Nebelhorn Trophy, Hurtado/Díaz became the first ice dancers to qualify an Olympic entry for Spain. They had no Grand Prix assignments. In January 2014, they finished 10th at the 2014 European Championships in Budapest, Hungary, allowing Spain to send two ice dancing teams to the next Europeans.

One month later, Hurtado/Díaz competed at the Winter Olympics in Sochi, Russia; they set personal best scores in both segments and finished in thirteenth place. They ended their season with a sixteenth-place result at the 2014 World Championships in Saitama.

=== 2014–2015 season ===
Returning to the Grand Prix series, Hurtado/Díaz placed eighth at the 2014 Skate Canada International and fourth at the 2014 Trophée Éric Bompard. They then achieved career-best ISU Championship results, finishing fifth with a new personal best score at the 2015 European Championships in Stockholm, Sweden, and then fourteenth at the 2015 World Championships in Shanghai, China.

=== 2015–2016 season: Hurtado/Díaz part ways ===
Hurtado/Díaz were invited to two Grand Prix events – the 2015 Trophée Éric Bompard and the 2015 Rostelecom Cup. However, on 16 October 2015, Hurtado announced on her personal Facebook page that she had decided to end the partnership. In a later interview, Hurtado stated that their partnership had experienced problems for some time and that therapy had not helped resolve these issues.

=== 2016–2017 season: Debut of Hurtado/Khaliavin ===
Hurtado and Russia's Kirill Khaliavin began considering skating together in late December 2015 and had a tryout in March 2016 in Moscow. He was released to skate for Spain in September 2016. They decided to be coached by Alexander Zhulin in Moscow. Making their international debut, they won gold at the Santa Claus Cup, held in December 2016 in Hungary. Later in the month, they won the Spanish national title ahead of Olivia Smart / Adrián Díaz.

Hurtado/Khaliavin finished thirteenth at the 2017 European Championships in Ostrava, Czech Republic. It was their final competition of the season. The Federación Española Deportes de Hielo (FEDH) selected Smart/Díaz to compete at the 2017 World Championships, the main Olympic-qualifying competition. Their result allowed Spain to send one ice dancing team to the Olympics.

=== 2017–2018 season: Pyeongchang Olympics ===
In July 2017, FEDH announced that Spain's Olympic spot in ice dancing would go to the team which received the highest combined score at the 2017 CS Golden Spin of Zagreb and Spanish Championships.

Hurtado/Khaliavin began their season in October with a sixth-place result at the 2017 CS Finlandia Trophy. The following month, they won gold at the Open d'Andorra. In December, they finished fourth at the 2017 CS Golden Spin of Zagreb, just 0.30 points behind bronze medalists Kaitlin Hawayek / Jean-Luc Baker of the United States. They outscored Smart/Díaz by 4.18 points at Golden Spin and finished second at the Spanish Championships with a 3.23 deficit, resulting in a final advantage of 0.95 points. On 17 December 2017, FEDH announced that Hurtado/Khaliavin would compete at the European Championships and Olympics while Smart/Díaz would be assigned to the 2018 World Championships.

In January, Hurtado/Khaliavin placed seventh in the short dance, tenth in the free dance, and eighth overall at the 2018 European Championships in Moscow. In February, they competed at the 2018 Winter Olympics in Pyeongchang, South Korea. Ranked twelfth in the short and eleventh in the free, the two finished twelfth overall.

The Spanish Federation had decided to send Olivia Smart and Adrian Diaz to the World Championships and so Hurtado and Khaliavin got an early start to the upcoming season. However, before that, they went to Spain and met King Felipe VI and Queen Letizia, who invited all the Winter Olympians from PyeongChang.

=== 2018–2019 season: First Grand Prix medal ===
Hurtado/Khaliavin began their season with bronze at the 2018 CS Lombardia Trophy in September. The following month, making their Grand Prix debut, they placed fourth at the 2018 Grand Prix of Helsinki and then won silver at the 2018 Rostelecom Cup, becoming the first Spanish ice dancers to stand on a Grand Prix podium. Hurtado called the occasion "a goal and I dreamed of it when I saw Javier getting on the podium. It proves to skaters in Spain that you can be here when you work hard."

After winning their second Spanish national title, Hurtado/Khaliavin competed at the 2019 European Championships, placing seventh, almost four points ahead of Smart/Díaz. They were consequently assigned to Spain's lone dance spot for the 2019 World Championships, where they placed twelfth.

=== 2019–2020 season ===
Beginning the season on the Challenger series at the 2019 CS Ondrej Nepela Memorial, Hurtado/Khaliavin took the silver medal. They next won gold at the 2019 CS Ice Star. At their first Grand Prix assignment, the 2019 Skate Canada International, they placed fifth. Weeks later at the 2019 Rostelecom Cup, they placed third in the rhythm dance. Hurtado said there was still "some little things in the technical aspect of the program" to fix, but that they felt the program was improving. Third in the free dance as well, they won their second Grand Prix medal.

After winning the silver medal at the Spanish championships, Hurtado/Khaliavin placed seventh at the 2020 European Championships, finishing ahead of Smart/Díaz. The latter were nevertheless assigned to the 2020 World Championships in Montreal, though these were subsequently cancelled as a result of the coronavirus pandemic.

=== 2020–2021 season ===
Hurtado suffered a shoulder injury in the summer of 2020 that required her to return to Spain for surgery, with a projected recovery time of six months. On December 1, Khaliavin indicated that they had reunited and resumed training.

While Smart/Díaz were listed on the preliminary entry list for the 2021 World Championships, the Spanish Ice Sports Federation announced on March 2 that the final determination as to which team would represent Spain would be made following a virtual skate-off between them and Hurtado/Khaliavin. On March 7, the Spanish federation announced that the berth had been awarded to Hurtado/Khaliavin. They placed eleventh in Stockholm. This qualified one place for a Spanish dance team at the 2022 Winter Olympics.

=== 2021–2022 season: Final season and retirement ===
Hurtado/Khaliavin began the season at the 2021 CS Lombardia Trophy, winning the bronze medal. They next competed at the 2021 CS Finlandia Trophy, the first of three matchups with Smart/Díaz to determine who would be named to the Spanish Olympic team. They were third in the rhythm dance, ahead of Smart/Díaz, but due to free dance errors finished in fifth place, 0.25 points behind their rivals in fourth.

At their first Grand Prix assignment, the 2021 NHK Trophy, Hurtado/Khaliavin placed fourth in the rhythm dance, 0.03 points behind third-place Britons Fear/Gibson. In the free dance, Khaliavin struggled to stabilize their curve lift, and they lost a level on their closing rotational lift, as a result of which they were fifth in that segment, but remained narrowly in fourth overall, 0.71 points ahead of the Canadian team Lajoie/Lagha. At the 2021 Rostelecom Cup, Hurtado/Khaliavin were fourth in both programs, again finishing fourth overall.

Hurtado/Khaliavin faced off against Smart/Díaz at the 2022 Spanish Championships, and finished second in both segments of the competition with a score of 191.90, 8.12 points behind their gold medalist rivals, widening their cumulative deficit to 8.37 points. Both teams then went to the 2022 European Championships, the third and final competition for the Spanish Olympic berth. Hurtado/Khaliavin were sixth in both segments for sixth overall. Khaliavin called their performance "the best we have skated it this season and it is maybe the best we have skated together in our career." Smart/Díaz finished in fourth place, 4.96 points ahead. With a cumulative margin of 13.33 points, Smart/Díaz were subsequently named to Spain's Olympic team.

The post-Olympic period brought about a major change in circumstances for Hurtado and Khaliavin, after Russia invaded neighbouring Ukraine and Spain and other NATO countries responded with major economic sanctions. As a result, Hurtado and the Khaliavin family relocated to Madrid indefinitely. Hurtado said that the invasion was a "shock," and that "it makes me very sad to think about that, about all the people I don't know when I'm going to see again." She also insisted "that the Russian people are not Putin."

On May 30, Hurtado and Khaliavin announced their retirement from competitive skating. Hurtado said that they had insufficient resources to continue competing, and that she hoped they would work together to develop a skating school in Spain in the future.

== Coaching career ==
In June 2023, Hurtado, Khaliavin, and Khaliavin's wife, Ksenia Monko, opened the SK International Ice Dance School in Madrid, Spain.

Their students have included:

- (Kazakhstan) Gaukhar Nauryzova / Boyisangur Datiev
- (Lithuania) Paulina Ramanauskaitė / Deividas Kizala
- (Spain) Sofía Val / Alexandre Gnedin
- (Spain) Sofía Val / Asaf Kazimov

== Programs ==
=== Ice dance with Kirill Khaliavin ===
Season	Rhythm dance	Free dance
2021–2022	Blues: Partition by Beyoncé; Hip Hop: Mi Gente by J Balvin, Willy William, & Beyoncé choreo. by Aykhan Shizhin, Alexander Zhulin & Sergei Petukhov	Since I've Been Loving You; Stairway to Heaven by Led Zeppelin choreo. by Aykhan Shizhin, Alexander Zhulin & Sergei Petukhov
2019–2021	Foxtrot: Hello Dolly performed by Barbra Streisand; Quickstep: Hello Dolly performed by Frank Sinatra choreo. by Sergei Petukhov	Orobroy by David Peña Dorantes; Puerta del Sol by Manolo Carrasco & Ara Malikian choreo. by Antonio Najarro
2018–2019	Tango: I've Seen That Face Before (Libertango) by Kovacs; Tango: Libertango by Astor Piazzolla performed by Miloš Karadaglić choreo. by Alexander Zhulin, Sergei Petukhov	The Great Gig in the Sky by Pink Floyd; Vladimir's Blues by Max Richter; Sign of the Times by Harry Styles choreo. by Iker Karrera
	Short dance	
2017–2018	Cha Cha: Oye Cómo Va; Samba: Maria by Carlos Santana choreo. by Alexander Zhulin & Sergei Petukhov	Flamenco Don Quixote by Ludwig Minkus choreo. by Antonio Najarro
2016–2017	Blues: Sweet Dreams; Swing: Douce Lumière by Térez Montcalm choreo. by Alexander Zhulin, Sergei Petukhov	Two Men in Love by The Irrepressibles choreo. by Alexander Zhulin, Sergei Petukhov

=== Ice dance with Adrián Díaz ===
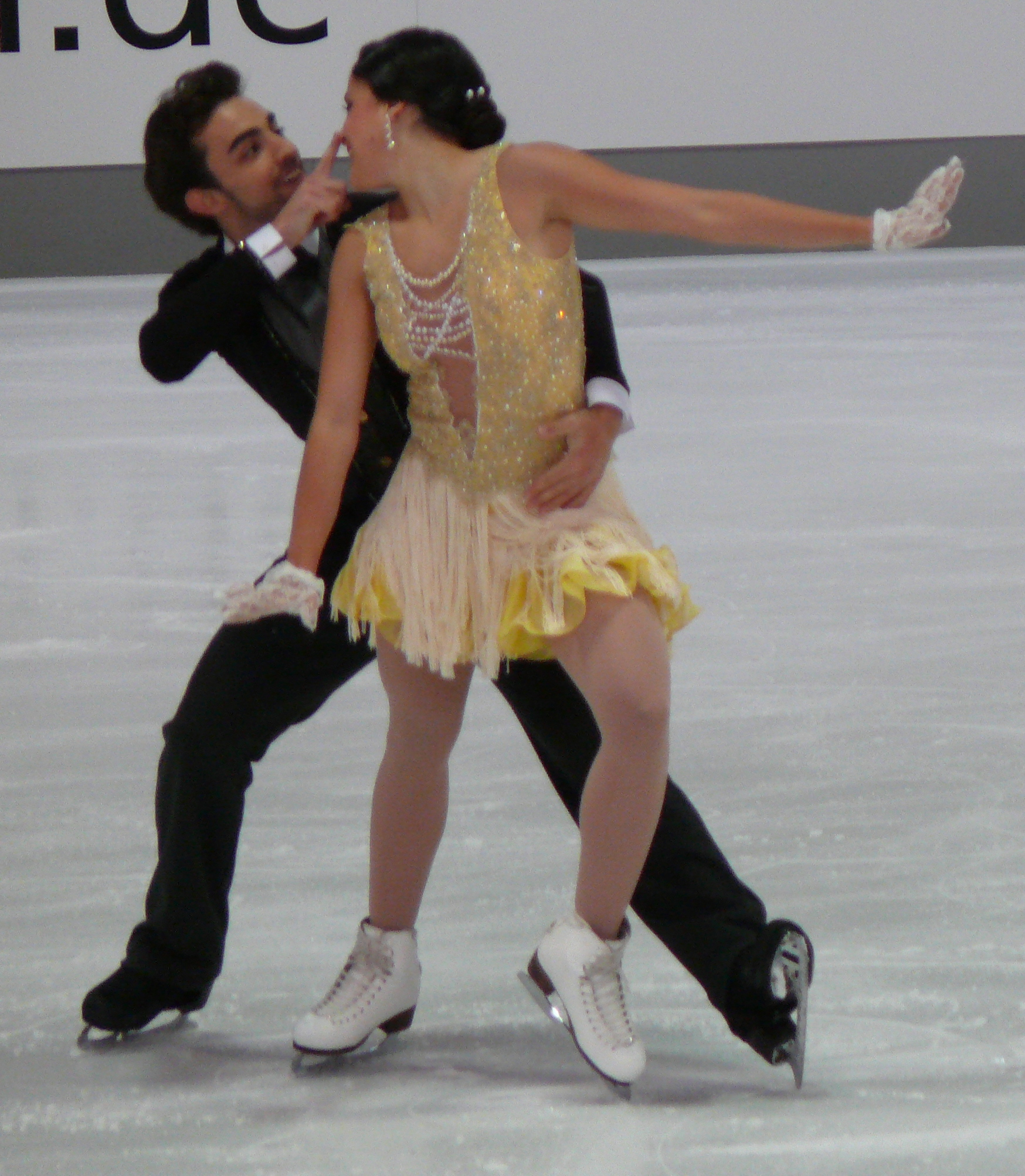
Hurtado and Díaz at the 2012 Nebelhorn Trophy.

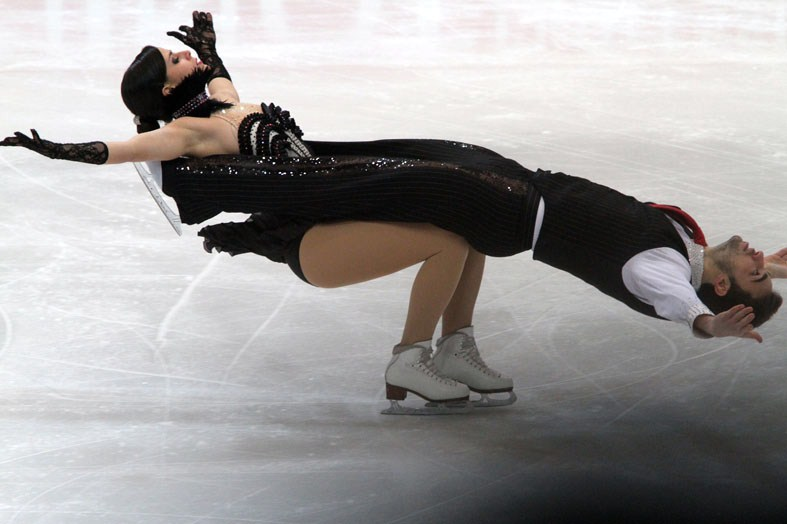
Hurtado and Díaz perform a lift at the 2011 European Championships.

Season	Short dance	Free dance	Exhibition
2015–2016	I Put a Spell on You performed by Nina Simone; I Put a Spell on You (Profetesa Smooth Dubstep Remix); Anything to Say You're Mine by Sonny Thompson; Spoonful by Willie Dixon performed by Etta James	Vesper by New Tango Orquesta; Nostalgia by Pasión Vega	
2014–2015	Paso doble: Tercio de Quites by Rafael Talens; Flamenco: Almoraima by Paco de Lucía; Flamenco: Alfileres de colores by Miguel Poveda; choreo. by Antonio Najarro	Meditation (from "Zumanity" - Cirque du Soleil); Atonement by Dario Marianelli; Original composition by Karl Hugo	Paso doble: Tercio de Quites by Rafael Talens; Flamenco: Almoraima by Paco de Lucía; Flamenco: Alfileres de colores by Miguel Poveda; Surviving Picasso by Richard Robbins; Le di a la caza alcance by Estrella Morente
2013–2014	Quickstep: Steppin' Out With My Baby (from "Insongniac") by Tim Draxl; Foxtrot: Boardwalk Empire; Charleston	Surviving Picasso by Richard Robbins; Le di a la caza alcance by Estrella Morente	
2012–2013	Waltz: Jane's Waltz; Polka: Modern Times	Little Wing; Pride and Joy by Stevie Ray Vaughan	
2011–2012	Mas que nada; Magalenha by Sérgio Mendes	Tristan & Iseult by Maxime Rodriguez	
2010–2011	Algo pequeñito by Daniel Diges; Ein Wiener Walzer by Karl Jenkins	Be Italian (from Nine) performed by Fergie	
	Original dance		
2009–2010	Granada by Paco de Lucía	Slumdog Millionaire by A. R. Rahman	
2008–2009	In the Mood by Glenn Miller; Summertime	300 by Tyler Bates	

== Competitive highlights ==
- GP – Event of the ISU Grand Prix Series
- JGP – Event of the ISU Junior Grand Prix Series
- CS – Event of the ISU Challenger Series
- WD – Withdrew from competition

=== Ice dance with Kirill Khaliavin ===
Competition placements at senior level
Season	2016–17	2017–18	2018–19	2019–20	2020–21	2021–22
Winter Olympics		12th				
World Championships			12th		11th	
European Championships	13th	8th	7th	7th		6th
Spanish Championships	1st	2nd	1st	2nd		2nd
GP Finland			4th			
GP NHK Trophy						4th
GP Rostelecom Cup			2nd	3rd		4th
GP Skate Canada				5th		
CS Finlandia Trophy		6th				5th
CS Golden Spin of Zagreb		4th				
CS Ice Star				1st		
CS Lombardia Trophy			3rd			3rd
CS Nepela Memorial				2nd		
Mentor Toruń Cup	2nd					
Open d'Andorra		1st				
Santa Claus Cup	1st					

=== Ice dance with Adrián Díaz ===
Competition placements at senior level
Season	2008–09	2010–11	2011–12	2012–13	2013–14	2014–15
Winter Olympics					13h	
World Championships		23rd	19th	19th	16th	14th
European Championships		15th	16th	15th	10th	5th
Spanish Championships	1st		1st	1st	1st	1st
GP Skate Canada						8th
GP Trophée Éric Bompard			8th			4th
CS Autumn Classic						5th
CS Golden Spin of Zagreb		11th	8th		5th	3rd
Bavarian Open		3rd				
Cup of Nice			3rd		2nd	
Mentor Toruń Cup					2nd	
Nebelhorn Trophy			7th	9th	8th	
NRW Trophy			6th			
Trophy of Lyon				2nd		
Winter Universiade		4th			8th	2nd

Competition placements at junior level
Season	2008–09	2009–10	2010–11
World Junior Championships	32nd	16th	9th
Spanish Championships		1st	1st
JGP Germany			5th
JGP Great Britain			10th
JGP South Africa	9th		
JGP Spain	WD		
JGP Turkey		6th	
JGP United States		10th	
Bavarian Open	4th	1st	
European Youth Olympic Festival		7th	
NRW Trophy		6th	8th

== Detailed results ==
=== Ice dance with Kirill Khaliavin ===
2021–22 season
Date	Event	RD	FD	Total
January 10–16, 2022	2022 European Championships	6; 75.83	6; 116.07	6; 191.90
December 16–19, 2021	2021 Spanish Championships	2; 79.90	2; 114.45	2; 194.35
November 26–28, 2021	2021 Rostelecom Cup	4; 75.94	4; 114.00	4; 189.94
November 12–14, 2021	2021 NHK Trophy	4; 76.40	5; 111.69	4; 188.09
October 7–10, 2021	2021 CS Finlandia Trophy	3; 74.79	6; 110.78	5; 185.57
September 10–12, 2021	2021 CS Lombardia Trophy	3; 72.65	3; 108.33	3; 180.98
2020–21 season
Date	Event	RD	FD	Total
March 22–28, 2021	2021 World Championships	12; 74.26	11; 111.87	11; 186.13
2019–20 season
Date	Event	RD	FD	Total
November 15–17, 2019	2019 Rostelecom Cup	3; 72.01	3; 113.00	3; 185.01
October 25–27, 2019	2019 Skate Canada International	5; 72.77	5; 107.87	5; 180.64
October 18–21, 2019	2019 CS Ice Star	1; 76.08	1; 117.39	1; 193.47
September 19–21, 2019	2019 CS Ondrej Nepela Memorial	2; 77.03	2; 111.94	2; 188.97
2018–19 season
Date	Event	RD	FD	Total
March 18–24, 2019	2019 World Figure Skating Championships	12; 72.45	13; 108.48	12; 180.93
January 21–27, 2019	2019 European Championships	8; 69.28	7; 111.39	7; 180.67
December 14–16, 2018	2018 Spanish Championships	2; 69.37	1; 110.79	1; 180.16
November 16–18, 2018	2018 Rostelecom Cup	3; 66.40	2; 108.02	2; 174.42
November 2–4, 2018	2018 Grand Prix of Helsinki	5; 66.25	3; 105.84	4; 172.09
September 12–16, 2018	2018 CS Lombardia Trophy	3; 65.03	2; 104.44	3; 169.47
2017–18 season
Date	Event	SD	FD	Total
February 19–20, 2018	2018 Winter Olympics	12; 66.93	11; 101.40	12; 168.33
January 15–21, 2018	2018 European Championships	7; 66.60	10; 98.43	8; 165.03
December 15–17, 2017	2017 Spanish Championships	2; 64.21	1; 100.33	2; 164.54
December 6–9, 2017	2017 CS Golden Spin of Zagreb	3; 67.14	4; 96.44	4; 163.58
November 22–26, 2017	2017 Open d'Andorra	1; 67.98	1; 103.89	1; 171.87
October 6–8, 2017	2017 CS Finlandia Trophy	8; 56.44	7; 88.22	6; 144.66
2016–17 season
Date	Event	SD	FD	Total
January 25–29, 2017	2017 European Championships	13; 56.52	15; 84.84	13; 141.36
January 10–15, 2017	2017 Toruń Cup	2; 65.76	3; 88.10	2; 153.86
December 6–11, 2016	2016 Santa Claus Cup	2; 54.91	1; 87.15	1; 142.06
