= Kirill Khaliavin =

Russian-Spanish ice dancer

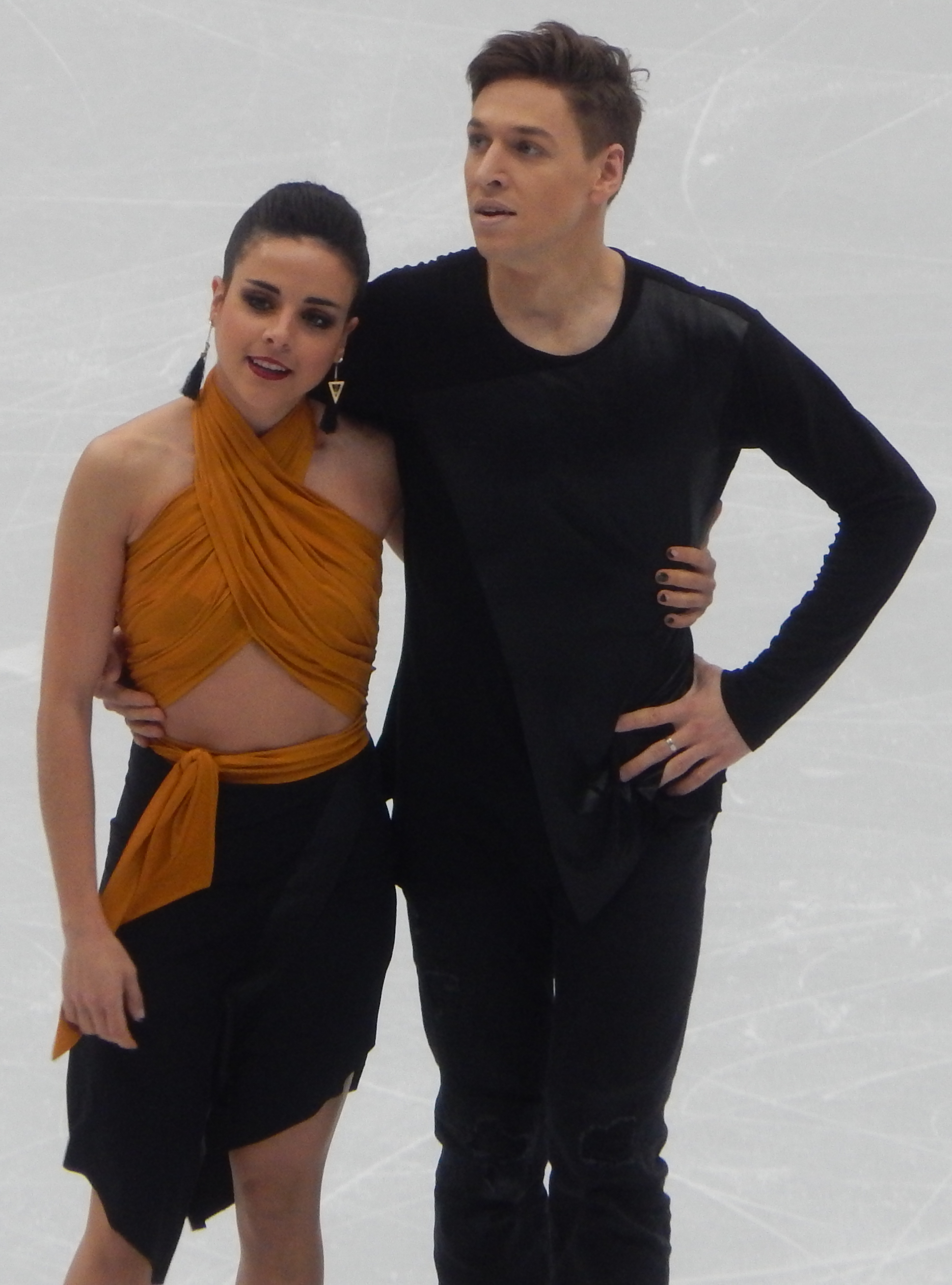
- Sara Hurtado and Kirill Khaliavin at the 2018 European Championships

Personal information
- Full name: Kirill Leonidovich Khaliavin
- Other names: Jalyavin/Khalyavin
- Born: 21 November 1990 (age 35) Kirov, Russian SFSR, Soviet Union
- Height: 1.77 m (5 ft 10 in)

Figure skating career
- Country: Spain (2016–22); Russia (2006–16)
- Discipline: Ice dance
- Partner: Sara Hurtado (2016–22); Ksenia Monko (2006–16)
- Began skating: 1993
- Retired: 2022

Medal record
Representing Spain
Spanish Championships
Gold medal – first place	2017 Vielha	Ice dance
Gold medal – first place	2019 Logroño	Ice dance
Silver medal – second place	2018 Jaca	Ice dance
Silver medal – second place	2020 San Sebastián	Ice dance
Silver medal – second place	2022 Jaca	Ice dance
Representing Russia
Russian Championships
Silver medal – second place	2015 Sochi	Ice dance
World Junior Championships
Gold medal – first place	2011 Gangneung	Ice dance
Bronze medal – third place	2010 The Hague	Ice dance
Junior Grand Prix Final
Gold medal – first place	2009–10 Tokyo	Ice dance
Gold medal – first place	2010–11 Beijing	Ice dance

Kirill Leonidovich Khaliavin (Russian: Кирилл Леонидович Халявин, IPA: [kʲɪˈrʲil lʲɪɐˈnʲidəvʲɪtɕ xɐˈlʲavʲɪn]; born 21 November 1990) is a Russian-Spanish retired ice dancer. Emerging on the international scene competing for Russia with Ksenia Monko, his future wife, Khaliavin became the 2011 World Junior champion, a two-time (2009, 2010) Junior Grand Prix Final champion, and the 2015 Russian national silver medalist.

Following Monko's retirement, Khaliavin formed a new partnership with Spanish ice dancer Sara Hurtado. With Hurtado he was the 2018 Rostelecom Cup silver medalist and 2017 & 2019 Spanish national champion. The two placed twelfth at the 2018 Winter Olympics and were the first Spanish ice dancers to stand on a Grand Prix podium.

== Personal life ==
Kirill Leonidovich Khaliavin was born 21 November 1990 in Kirov, Kirov Oblast. He married Ksenia Monko in Moscow in late May 2017. He became a Spanish citizen in July 2017. Monko and Khaliavin's son was born in October 2020. The couple moved to Madrid, Spain in 2022.

== Career ==
=== Early years ===
Khaliavin started skating in 1994. He began learning ice dancing when he was eight years old. His first coach was Tatiana Kurakina.

=== 2000 to 2009: Early years of Monko/Khaliavin ===
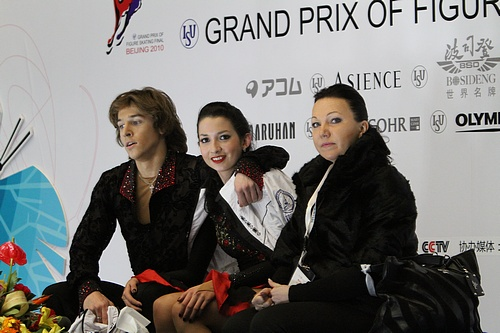
Khaliavin with his partner Ksenia Monko and Olga Riabinina

Khaliavin teamed up with Monko in 2000. The two debuted on the ISU Junior Grand Prix series in 2006, placing eleventh in Norway. They trained in Kirov before problems with ice time led them to move to Rostov in 2005. They relocated with their coach to Moscow in May 2009.

=== 2009–2010 season: First JGP Final title ===
Monko/Khaliavin won the Junior Grand Prix Final and the Russian Junior title. They took the bronze at the 2010 World Junior Championships.

=== 2010–2011 season: World Junior title ===
Monko/Khaliavin won their second JGP Final title, and followed that up with their second Russian Junior title. They won gold at the 2011 World Junior Championships.

=== 2011–2012 season: Senior debut ===
Monko/Khaliavin moved up to the senior level for the 2011–12 season. They were assigned to compete at 2011 Skate America and 2011 Cup of China as their Grand Prix events but Khaliavin fell ill with mononucleosis in September. They withdrew from both Grand Prix events but returned to competition at the Russian Championships where they finished fifth.

In February 2012, Monko/Khaliavin switched coaches to Alexander Zhulin and Oleg Volkov.

=== 2012–2013 season ===
Monko/Khaliavin finished sixth at the 2012 Rostelecom Cup and fourth at the 2013 Russian Championships. They joined the Russian team to the 2013 World Team Trophy, replacing Ekaterina Bobrova / Dmitri Soloviev who withdrew due to injury. Monko/Khaliavin finished third at the event and Team Russia finished fourth overall. The duo withdrew from the exhibitions after Khaliavin developed an infection resulting in a high fever.

=== 2013–2014 season ===
Monko/Khaliavin won silver at the 2013 Nebelhorn Trophy, behind Americans Madison Hubbell / Zachary Donohue, and then bronze at the 2013 International Cup of Nice. Their Grand Prix results were sixth at the 2013 Trophée Eric Bompard and fifth at the 2013 Rostelecom Cup. After placing fifth at the 2014 Russian Championships, they were not selected for the Olympics.

=== 2014–2015 season ===
Monko and Khaliavin placed fourth at 2014 Skate Canada International and second at 2014 NHK Trophy. They went on to place second at the 2015 Russian Figure Skating Championships. They finished tenth at the 2015 European Championships and 8th at the 2015 World Championships.

=== 2015–2016 season: Monko/Khaliavin end partnership ===
Monko/Khaliavin started their season by finishing fourth at the 2015 Skate Canada International. They withdrew from their second Grand Prix assignment, the 2015 Rostelecom Cup, due to Monko's injury. In 2016, she retired from competition due to the injury.

=== 2016–2017 season: Debut of Hurtado/Khaliavin ===
Khaliavin and Spain's Sara Hurtado began considering skating together in late December 2015 and had a tryout in March 2016 in Moscow. He was released to skate for Spain in September 2016. They decided to be coached by Alexander Zhulin in Moscow. Making their international debut, they won gold at the Santa Claus Cup, held in December 2016 in Hungary. Later in the month, they won the Spanish national title ahead of Olivia Smart / Adrià Díaz.

Hurtado/Khaliavin finished thirteenth at the 2017 European Championships in Ostrava, Czech Republic. It was their final competition of the season. The Federación Española Deportes de Hielo (FEDH) selected Smart/Díaz to compete at the 2017 World Championships.

=== 2017–2018 season: Winter Olympics ===
In July 2017, FEDH announced that Spain's Olympic spot in ice dancing would go to the team which received the highest combined score at the 2017 CS Golden Spin of Zagreb and Spanish Championships.

Hurtado/Khaliavin began their season in October with a sixth-place result at the 2017 CS Finlandia Trophy. The following month, they won gold at the Open d'Andorra. In December, they finished fourth at the 2017 CS Golden Spin of Zagreb, just 0.30 points behind bronze medalists Kaitlin Hawayek / Jean-Luc Baker of the United States. They outscored Smart/Díaz by 4.18 points at Golden Spin and finished second at the Spanish Championships with a 3.23 deficit, resulting in a final advantage of 0.95 points. On 17 December 2017, FEDH confirmed that Hurtado/Khaliavin would compete at the Olympics.

In January, Hurtado/Khaliavin placed seventh in the short dance, tenth in the free dance, and eighth overall at the 2018 European Championships in Moscow. In February, they competed at the 2018 Winter Olympics in Pyeongchang, South Korea. Ranked twelfth in the short and eleventh in the free, the two finished twelfth overall.

The Spanish Federation had decided to send Olivia Smart and Adria Diaz to the World Championships and so Hurtado and Khaliavin got an early start to the upcoming season. However, before that, they went to Spain and met King Felipe VI and Queen Letizia, who invited all the Winter Olympians from PyeongChang.

=== 2018–2019 season: First Grand Prix medal ===
Hurtado/Khaliavin began their season with bronze at the 2018 CS Lombardia Trophy in September. The following month, making their Grand Prix debut, they placed fourth at the 2018 Grand Prix of Helsinki and then won silver at the 2018 Rostelecom Cup, becoming the first Spanish ice dancers to stand on a Grand Prix podium. Hurtado called the occasion "a goal and I dreamed of it when I saw Javier getting on the podium. It proves to skaters in Spain that you can be here when you work hard."

After winning their second Spanish national title, Hurtado/Khaliavin competed at the 2019 European Championships, placing seventh, almost four points ahead of Smart/Díaz. They were consequently assigned to Spain's lone dance spot for the 2019 World Championships, where they placed twelfth.

=== 2019–2020 season ===
Beginning the season on the Challenger series at the 2019 CS Ondrej Nepela Memorial, Hurtado/Khaliavin took the silver medal. They next won gold at the 2019 CS Ice Star. At their first Grand Prix assignment, the 2019 Skate Canada International, they placed fifth. Weeks later at the 2019 Rostelecom Cup, they placed third in the rhythm dance. Hurtado said there was still "some little things in the technical aspect of the program" to fix, but that they felt the program was improving. Third in the free dance as well, they won their second Grand Prix medal.

After winning the silver medal at the Spanish championships, Hurtado/Khaliavin placed seventh at the 2020 European Championships, finishing ahead of Smart/Díaz. The latter were nevertheless assigned to the 2020 World Championships in Montreal, though these were subsequently cancelled as a result of the coronavirus pandemic.

=== 2020–2021 season ===
Hurtado suffered a shoulder injury in the summer of 2020 that required her to return to Spain for surgery, with a projected recovery time of six months. On December 1, Khaliavin indicated that they had reunited and resumed training.

While Smart/Díaz were listed on the preliminary entry list for the 2021 World Championships, the Spanish Ice Sports Federation announced on March 2 that the final determination as to which team would represent Spain would be made following a virtual skate-off between them and Hurtado/Khaliavin. On March 7, the Spanish federation announced that the berth had been awarded to Hurtado/Khaliavin. They placed eleventh in Stockholm. This qualified one place for a Spanish dance team at the 2022 Winter Olympics.

=== 2021–2022 season: Final season and retirement ===
Hurtado/Khaliavin began the season at the 2021 CS Lombardia Trophy, winning the bronze medal. They next competed at the 2021 CS Finlandia Trophy, the first of three matchups with Smart/Díaz to determine who would be named to the Spanish Olympic team. They were third in the rhythm dance, ahead of Smart/Díaz, but due to free dance errors finished in fifth place, 0.25 points behind their rivals in fourth.

At their first Grand Prix assignment, the 2021 NHK Trophy, Hurtado/Khaliavin placed fourth in the rhythm dance, 0.03 points behind third-place Britons Fear/Gibson. In the free dance, Khaliavin struggled to stabilize their curve lift, and they lost a level on their closing rotational lift, as a result of which they were fifth in that segment, but remained narrowly in fourth overall, 0.71 points ahead of the Canadian team Lajoie/Lagha. At the 2021 Rostelecom Cup, Hurtado/Khaliavin were fourth in both programs, again finishing fourth overall.

Hurtado/Khaliavin faced off against Smart/Díaz at the 2022 Spanish Championships, and finished second in both segments of the competition with a score of 191.90, 8.12 points behind their gold medalist rivals, widening their cumulative deficit to 8.37 points. Both teams then went to the 2022 European Championships, the third and final competition for the Spanish Olympic berth. Hurtado/Khaliavin were sixth in both segments for sixth overall. Khaliavin called their performance "the best we have skated it this season and it is maybe the best we have skated together in our career." Smart/Díaz finished in fourth place, 4.96 points ahead. With a cumulative margin of 13.33 points, Smart/Díaz were subsequently named to Spain's Olympic team.

The post-Olympic period brought about a major change in circumstances for Hurtado and Khaliavin, after Russia invaded neighbouring Ukraine and Spain and other NATO countries responded with major economic sanctions. As a result, Hurtado and the Khaliavin family relocated to Madrid indefinitely.

On May 30, Hurtado and Khaliavin announced their retirement from competitive skating. Hurtado said that they had insufficient resources to continue competing, and that she hoped they would work together to develop a skating school in Spain in the future.

== Coaching career ==
In June 2023, Hurtado, Khaliavin, and Khalivin's wife opened the SK International Ice Dance School in Madrid, Spain.

Their students have included:

- (Lithuania) Jogailė Aglinskytė
- (Kazakhstan) Gaukhar Nauryzova / Boyisangur Datiev
- (Lithuania) Paulina Ramanauskaitė / Deividas Kizala
- (Spain) Sofía Val / Alexandre Gnedin
- (Spain) Sofía Val / Asaf Kazimov
- (Lithuania) Meda Variakojytė

== Programs ==
=== Ice dance with Sara Hurtado (for Spain) ===
Season	Rhythm dance	Free dance
2021–2022	Blues: Partition by Beyoncé; Hip Hop: Mi Gente by J Balvin, Willy William, & Beyoncé choreo. by Aykhan Shizhin, Alexander Zhulin & Sergei Petukhov	Since I've Been Loving You; Stairway to Heaven by Led Zeppelin choreo. by Aykhan Shizhin, Alexander Zhulin & Sergei Petukhov
2019–2021	Foxtrot: Hello Dolly performed by Barbra Streisand; Quickstep: Hello Dolly performed by Frank Sinatra choreo. by Sergei Petukhov	Orobroy by David Peña Dorantes; Puerta del Sol by Manolo Carrasco & Ara Malikian choreo. by Antonio Najarro
2018–2019	Tango: I've Seen That Face Before (Libertango) by Kovacs; Tango: Libertango by Astor Piazzolla performed by Miloš Karadaglić choreo. by Alexander Zhulin, Sergei Petukhov	The Great Gig in the Sky by Pink Floyd; Vladimir's Blues by Max Richter; Sign of the Times by Harry Styles choreo. by Iker Karrera
	Short dance	
2017–2018	Cha Cha: Oye Cómo Va; Samba: Maria by Carlos Santana choreo. by Alexander Zhulin & Sergei Petukhov	Flamenco Don Quixote by Ludwig Minkus choreo. by Antonio Najarro
2016–2017	Blues: Sweet Dreams; Swing: Douce Lumière by Térez Montcalm choreo. by Alexander Zhulin, Sergei Petukhov	Two Men in Love by The Irrepressibles choreo. by Alexander Zhulin, Sergei Petukhov

=== Ice dance with Ksenia Monko (for Russia) ===
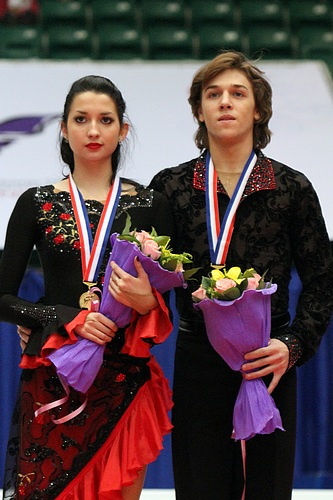
Monko and Khaliavin at the 2010 Junior Grand Prix Final.

Season	Short dance	Free dance	Exhibition
2015–2016	Polka and waltz: Howl's Moving Castle by Joe Hisaishi	Torn by Nathan Lanier; Eternal by William Joseph	
2014–2015	Flamenco: Suite Festiva de Éxitos IV by Pascual Gonzalez, Cantores de Hispalis, David Bisbal; Paso doble: España cañí by Pascual Marquina Narro; Flamenco: La Danza del Amor by Cantores de Hispalis	Sarabande by Escala; Sarabande Suite by Globus	
2013–2014	Quickstep by Big Bad Voodoo Daddy; Foxtrot: LOVE by Nat King Cole	Music by René Aubry; Music by Gaetano Donizetti	
2012–2013	Waltz: Sous le Ciel de Paris by Yves Montand; Polka:	?; Me Voy by Jasmin Levy	
2011–2012	Samba: Paxi Ni Ngongo by Bonga; Samba:	Tango Medley: Duo de Amor; Oblivion by Astor Piazzolla; No Stop City by New Tango Orquesta	
2010–2011	Waltz: Padam, padam... by Édith Piaf	Frida by Elliot Goldenthal	Ukrainian folk dance: Nich Yaka Misyachna (Ukrainian: Ніч яка місячна); Hopak
	Original dance		
2009–2010	Ukrainian folk dance: Nich Yaka Misyachna (Ukrainian: Ніч яка місячна); Hopak	It's a Man's Man's Man's World performed by James Brown, Luciano Pavarotti	Più che puoi by Eros Ramazzotti, Cher
2007–08	Ukrainian folk dance: Nich Yaka Misyachna (Ukrainian: Ніч яка місячна); Hopak	The Mask of Zorro by James Horner	

== Competitive highlights ==
- GP – Event of the ISU Grand Prix Series
- JGP – Event of the ISU Junior Grand Prix Series
- CS – Event of the ISU Challenger Series
- WD – Withdrew from competition

=== Ice dance with Sara Hurtado (for Spain) ===
Competition placements at senior level
Season	2016–17	2017–18	2018–19	2019–20	2020–21	2021–22
Winter Olympics		12th				
World Championships			12th		11th	
European Championships	13th	8th	7th	7th		6th
Spanish Championships	1st	2nd	1st	2nd		2nd
GP Finland			4th			
GP NHK Trophy						4th
GP Rostelecom Cup			2nd	3rd		4th
GP Skate Canada				5th		
CS Finlandia Trophy		6th				5th
CS Golden Spin of Zagreb		4th				
CS Ice Star				1st		
CS Lombardia Trophy			3rd			3rd
CS Nepela Memorial				2nd		
Mentor Toruń Cup	2nd					
Open d'Andorra		1st				
Santa Claus Cup	1st					

=== Ice dance with Ksenia Monko (for Russia) ===
Competition placements at senior level
Season	2011–12	2012–13	2013–14	2014–15	2015–16
World Championships				8th	
European Championships				10th	
Spanish Championships	5th	4th	5th	2nd	
World Team Trophy		4th (3rd)			
GP NHK Trophy				2nd	
GP Rostelecom Cup		6th	5th		WD
GP Skate Canada				4th	5th
GP Trophée Éric Bompard			6th		
Cup of Nice		1st	3rd		
Ice Star				1st	1st
Nebelhorn Trophy		4th	2nd		
Winter Universiade			6th		

Competition placements at junior level
Season	2006–07	2007–08	2008–09	2009–10	2010–11
World Junior Championships				3rd	1st
Junior Grand Prix Final				1st	1st
Russian Championships	8th	4th	5th	1st	1st
JGP Belarus				1st	
JGP Croatia		3rd			
JGP Czech Republic			5th		
JGP Great Britain					1st
JGP Norway	11th				
JGP Romania		3rd			1st
JGP South Africa			3rd		
JGP Turkey				1st	

== Detailed results ==
=== Ice dance with Sara Hurtado (for Spain) ===
2021–22 season
Date	Event	RD	FD	Total
January 10–16, 2022	2022 European Championships	6; 75.83	6; 116.07	6; 191.90
December 16–19, 2021	2021 Spanish Championships	2; 79.90	2; 114.45	2; 194.35
November 26–28, 2021	2021 Rostelecom Cup	4; 75.94	4; 114.00	4; 189.94
November 12–14, 2021	2021 NHK Trophy	4; 76.40	5; 111.69	4; 188.09
October 7–10, 2021	2021 CS Finlandia Trophy	3; 74.79	6; 110.78	5; 185.57
September 10–12, 2021	2021 CS Lombardia Trophy	3; 72.65	3; 108.33	3; 180.98
2020–21 season
Date	Event	RD	FD	Total
March 22–28, 2021	2021 World Championships	12; 74.26	11; 111.87	11; 186.13
2019–20 season
Date	Event	RD	FD	Total
November 15–17, 2019	2019 Rostelecom Cup	3; 72.01	3; 113.00	3; 185.01
October 25–27, 2019	2019 Skate Canada International	5; 72.77	5; 107.87	5; 180.64
October 18–21, 2019	2019 CS Ice Star	1; 76.08	1; 117.39	1; 193.47
September 19–21, 2019	2019 CS Ondrej Nepela Memorial	2; 77.03	2; 111.94	2; 188.97
2018–19 season
Date	Event	RD	FD	Total
March 18–24, 2019	2019 World Figure Skating Championships	12; 72.45	13; 108.48	12; 180.93
January 21–27, 2019	2019 European Championships	8; 69.28	7; 111.39	7; 180.67
December 14–16, 2018	2018 Spanish Championships	2; 69.37	1; 110.79	1; 180.16
November 16–18, 2018	2018 Rostelecom Cup	3; 66.40	2; 108.02	2; 174.42
November 2–4, 2018	2018 Grand Prix of Helsinki	5; 66.25	3; 105.84	4; 172.09
September 12–16, 2018	2018 CS Lombardia Trophy	3; 65.03	2; 104.44	3; 169.47
2017–18 season
Date	Event	SD	FD	Total
February 19–20, 2018	2018 Winter Olympics	12; 66.93	11; 101.40	12; 168.33
January 15–21, 2018	2018 European Championships	7; 66.60	10; 98.43	8; 165.03
December 15–17, 2017	2017 Spanish Championships	2; 64.21	1; 100.33	2; 164.54
December 6–9, 2017	2017 CS Golden Spin of Zagreb	3; 67.14	4; 96.44	4; 163.58
November 22–26, 2017	2017 Open d'Andorra	1; 67.98	1; 103.89	1; 171.87
October 6–8, 2017	2017 CS Finlandia Trophy	8; 56.44	7; 88.22	6; 144.66
2016–17 season
Date	Event	SD	FD	Total
January 25–29, 2017	2017 European Championships	13; 56.52	15; 84.84	13; 141.36
January 10–15, 2017	2017 Toruń Cup	2; 65.76	3; 88.10	2; 153.86
December 6–11, 2016	2016 Santa Claus Cup	2; 54.91	1; 87.15	1; 142.06
