= Deividas Kizala =

Lithuanian figure skater (born 1998)

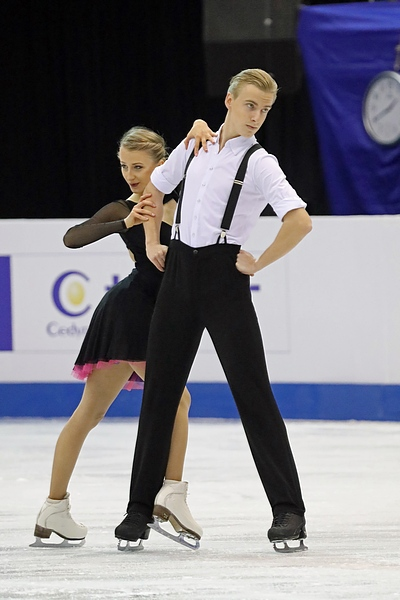
- Guostė Damulevičiūtė and Deividas Kizala at the 2017 World Junior Championships

Personal information
- Born: 12 February 1998 (age 28) Kaunas, Lithuania
- Height: 1.86 m (6 ft 1 in)

Figure skating career
- Country: Lithuania
- Discipline: Ice dance
- Partner: Ksenia Sipunova (2026+); Paulina Ramanauskaitė (2020–26); Mira Polishook (2018–19); Guostė Damulevičiūtė (2014–18)
- Coach: Kirill Khaliavin; Sara Hurtado; Ksenia Monko
- Skating club: Startas, Kaunas
- Began skating: 2001

Medal record
Lithuanian Championships
Silver medal – second place	2018 Kaunas	Ice dance
Silver medal – second place	2021 Elektrėnai	Ice dance
Silver medal – second place	2022 Kaunas	Ice dance
Silver medal – second place	2023 Kaunas	Ice dance
Silver medal – second place	2025 Kaunas	Ice dance

Deividas Kizala (born 12 February 1998) is a Lithuanian ice dancer. With his former partner, Paulina Ramanauskaitė, he competed at the 2022 Winter Olympics.

== Career ==
=== Early years ===
As a single skater, Kizala was coached by Loreta Vitkauskienė and competed at two ISU Junior Grand Prix events in 2011.

By 2014, he had teamed up with Guostė Damulevičiūtė to compete in ice dancing. The two debuted their partnership at the Volvo Open Cup in November 2014. They would represent Lithuania at three ISU Junior Grand Prix (JGP) events and three consecutive World Junior Championships, from 2015 to 2017. They qualified to the free dance at the 2017 World Junior Championships and finished 17th overall. They also made several appearances in the senior ranks, most notably at the 2018 European Championships. They ended their partnership after four seasons together.

In the 2018–19 season, Kizala skated with American ice dancer Mira Polishook, representing Lithuania in the junior ranks. The duo competed at two JGP events and qualified to the final segment at the 2019 World Junior Championships, where they finished 19th. They parted ways after one season as a team.

=== Partnership with Ramanauskaitė ===
In 2020, Kizala teamed up with Paulina Ramanauskaitė to compete as seniors. The two made their international debut in December 2020, at the Winter Star in Minsk, Belarus.

Although Allison Reed / Saulius Ambrulevičius qualified a spot for Lithuania in ice dancing at the 2022 Winter Olympics, Reed's application for Lithuanian citizenship was unsuccessful. Following this decision, Ramanauskaitė/Kizala were nominated to fill the spot and placed 23rd at the Olympics.

Ramanauskaitė/Kizala were entered to compete in the 2025 World Championships. However, less than two weeks before the competition, they withdrew after Kizala fractured his leg while running and was in too much pain to continue training.

In June 2026, Ramanauskaitė announced her retirement from competitive skating, ending their partnership.

=== Partnership with Sipunova ===
On August 25, it was announced that Kizala had teamed up with Estonia skater Ksenia Siuponva, representing Lithuania.

== Programs ==
=== With Ramanauskaitė ===
Season	Rhythm dance	Free dance	Exhibition
2024–2025	These Boots Are Made for Walkin'; Money (That's What I Want) by The Supremes choreo. by Kirill Khaliavin, Sara Hurtado, Oscar Munoz	Heaven Knows by Chase & Status ft. Elli Ingram choreo. by Kirill Khaliavin, Sara Hurtado, Oscar Munoz	
2023–2024	I Love Rock 'n' Roll; Crimson and Clover by Joan Jett and the Blackhearts; Call Me by Blondie choreo. by Kirill Khaliavin, Sara Hurtado	En Contra by MLNGA CLUB; Duo de amor by Astor Piazzolla	Highway to Hell by AC/DC; Still Got the Blues by Gary Moore; Demon Fire by AC/DC
2022–2023	Samba: La Vida Es Un Carnaval performed by Celia Cruz; Rhumba: Sway by Pérez Prado, Rosemary Clooney; Samba: Magalenha by Sérgio Mendes	Highway to Hell by AC/DC; Still Got the Blues by Gary Moore; Demon Fire by AC/DC	
2021–2022	Blues: Russian Roulette by Rihanna; Hip Hop: Hard by Rihanna	Lighthouse by Patrick Watson; Hoodoo by Muse	
2020–2021	Top Hat; Overture; Puttin' On the Ritz; Let's Face the Music and Dance	Raudoni Vakarai by Ieva Narkutė; Dark Creatures by Cœur de pirate	

=== With Polishook ===
Season	Rhythm dance	Free dance
2018–2019	Foxtrot: The Pink Panther Theme by Henry Mancini; Tango: Pantera Tanguera by Cuarteto Almagro; Foxtrot	Street. Horse. Smell. Candle (from Penny Dreadful) by Abel Korzeniowski; Pilgrims On a Long Journey; Metal Gleamed in the Twilight by Cœur de pirate

=== With Damulevičiūtė ===
Season	Rhythm dance	Free dance
2017–2018	Rhumba: Historia de un amor performed by Ana Gabriel; Samba: Happy in Rio (Spiritual South Remix) by Max Sedgley	West Side Story by Leonard Bernstein; Prologue; Gym Mambo; Maria; America
2016–2017	Blues; Swing	West Side Story by Leonard Bernstein
2015–2016	March: Persian March by Johann Strauss II; Waltz: Libiamo ne' lieti calici (from La traviata) by Giuseppe Verdi	Alice in Wonderland by Danny Elfman
2014–2015	Samba: Suave (Kiss Me) by Nayer, Mohombi, Pitbull; Rhumba: Paxi Ni Ngongo by Bonga; Samba: La La La by Shakira, Carlinhos Brown	Happy by Pharrell Williams; She's Like the Wind by Swaytrick; Shout by The Isley Brothers

=== Men's singles ===
Season	Short program	Free skating
2011–2012	Soviet movie by Eduard Artemev	Chess by Tim Rice, Benny Andersson, Björn Ulvaeus

== Competitive highlights ==
- JGP – Event of the ISU Junior Grand Prix Series
- CS – Event of the ISU Challenger Series
- TBD – Assigned
- WD – Withdrew from competition

=== Ice dance with Paulina Ramanauskaitė ===
Competition placements at senior level
Season	2020–21	2021–22	2022–23	2023–24	2024–25
Winter Olympics		23rd			
World Championships			26th	31st	
European Championships			17th	16th	19th
Lithuanian Championships	2nd	2nd			
CS Budapest Trophy					10th
CS Finlandia Trophy		15th	8th		
CS Golden Spin of Zagreb				10th	
CS Lombardia Trophy			9th		
CS Nepela Memorial				14th	
CS Tallinn Trophy					11th
CS Warsaw Cup		19th			
Bosphorus Cup				5th	
Britannia Cup			4th		
Ice Star	4th				
NRW Trophy		4th			
Trophée Métropole Nice		11th		2nd	
Winter University Games			11th		

=== Ice dance with Mira Polishook ===
Competition placements at junior level
Season	2018–19
World Junior Championships	19th
JGP Czech Republic	12th
JGP Lithuania	12th
Golden Spin of Zagreb	4th
Tallinn Trophy	6th

=== Ice dance with Guoste Damulevičiūtė ===
International
Event	14–15	15–16	16–17	17–18
Europeans				24th
CS Tallinn Trophy				11th
Volvo Open				9th
International: Junior
Junior Worlds	24th	22nd	17th	
Youth Olympics		9th		
JGP Austria		9th		
JGP Poland				11th
JGP Slovakia		14th		
Bavarian Open	11th			
Ice Star			13th	
Jégvirág Cup			3rd	
Mentor Toruń Cup		4th	6th	
NRW Trophy		11th		
Pavel Roman Memorial		4th		
Tallinn Trophy	9th			
Volvo Open			6th	
National
Lithuanian Champ.		1st J	1st J	2nd

=== Single skating ===
International: Junior
Event	09–10	10–11	11–12	12–13
JGP Estonia			16th	
JGP Latvia			20th	
National
Lithuanian Champ.	3rd	3rd		2nd

== Detailed results ==
=== Ice dance with Paulina Ramanauskaitė ===
ISU personal best scores in the +5/-5 GOE System
Segment	Type	Score	Event
Total	TSS	156.91	2023 CS Golden Spin of Zagreb
Rhythm dance	TSS	62.52	2024 CS Budapest Trophy
Rhythm dance	TES	34.93	2024 CS Budapest Trophy
Rhythm dance	PCS	27.72	2024 CS Tallinn Trophy
Free dance	TSS	94.57	2023 CS Golden Spin of Zagreb
Free dance	TES	52.37	2023 CS Golden Spin of Zagreb
Free dance	PCS	42.60	2024 CS Budapest Trophy

Results in the 2020-21 season
Date	Event	RD		FD		Total	
Date	Event	P	Score	P	Score	P	Score
Dec 11–13, 2020	(Belarus) 2020 Ice Star	4	64.04	4	88.64	4	152.68

Results in the 2021-22 season
Date	Event	RD		FD		Total	
Date	Event	P	Score	P	Score	P	Score
Oct 7–10, 2021	(Finland) 2021 CS Finlandia Trophy	15	52.87	15	72.92	15	125.79
Oct 20–24, 2021	(France) 2021 Trophée Métropole Nice Côte d'Azur	11	50.11	11	69.76	11	119.87
Nov 4–7, 2021	(Germany) 2021 NRW Trophy	4	56.17	4	82.92	4	139.09
Nov 18–20, 2021	(Poland) 2021 CS Warsaw Cup	19	53.15	19	79.88	19	133.03
Feb 7–20, 2022	(China) 2022 Winter Olympics	23	58.35	–	–	23	58.35

Results in the 2022-23 season
Date	Event	RD		FD		Total	
Date	Event	P	Score	P	Score	P	Score
Aug 26–28, 2022	(United Kingdom) 2022 Britannia Cup	4	58.37	4	85.69	4	144.06
Sep 13–19, 2022	(Italy) 2024 CS Lombardia Trophy	9	55.20	9	91.18	9	146.38
Oct 6–9, 2022	(Finland) 2022 CS Finlandia Trophy	8	54.50	7	80.47	8	134.97
Jan 12–16, 2023	(United States) 2023 Winter World University Games	9	55.29	12	77.11	11	132.40
Jan 23–29, 2023	(Finland) 2023 European Championships	16	55.06	17	81.14	17	136.20
Mar 22–26, 2023	(Hungary) 2024 World Championships	26	58.06	–	–	26	58.06

Results in the 2023-24 season
Date	Event	RD		FD		Total	
Date	Event	P	Score	P	Score	P	Score
Sep 28–30, 2023	(Slovakia) 2023 CS Nepela Memorial	14	52.30	14	81.86	14	134.16
Oct 18–22, 2023	(France) 2023 Trophée Métropole Nice Côte d'Azur	2	58.13	3	84.25	2	142.38
Nov 27 – Dec 3, 2023	(Turkey) 2023 Bosphorus Cup	6	64.83	5	106.20	5	171.03
Dec 6–9, 2023	(Croatia) 2023 CS Golden Spin of Zagreb	9	62.34	10	94.57	10	156.91
Jan 8–14, 2024	(Lithuania) 2024 European Championships	20	60.76	16	94.09	16	154.85
Mar 18–24, 2024	(Canada) 2024 World Championships	31	58.32	–	–	31	58.32

Results in the 2024–25 season
Date	Event	RD		FD		Total	
Date	Event	P	Score	P	Score	P	Score
Oct 11–13, 2024	(Hungary) 2024 CS Budapest Trophy	10	62.52	11	93.49	10	156.01
Nov 11–17, 2024	(Hungary) 2024 CS Tallinn Trophy	12	60.02	11	91.64	11	151.66
Jan 28 – Feb 2, 2025	(Estonia) 2025 European Championships	18	61.56	19	95.50	19	157.06
