= Paulina Ramanauskaitė =

Lithuanian figure skater (born 2003)

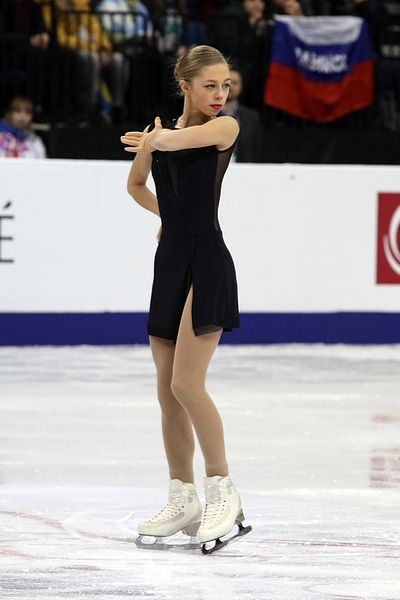
- Ramanauskaitė at the 2019 European Championships

Personal information
- Born: 27 January 2003 (age 23) Kaunas, Lithuania
- Height: 1.65 m (5 ft 5 in)

Figure skating career
- Country: Lithuania
- Partner: Deividas Kizala
- Coach: Sara Hurtado; Kirill Khaliavin; Ksenia Monko
- Skating club: Baltų Ainiai
- Began skating: 2007
- Retired: 24 June 2026

Medal record
Lithuanian Championships
Gold medal – first place	2021 Elektrėnai	Singles
Silver medal – second place	2021 Elektrėnai	Ice dance
Silver medal – second place	2022 Kaunas	Ice dance
Silver medal – second place	2023 Kaunas	Ice dance
Silver medal – second place	2025 Kaunas	Ice dance

Paulina Ramanauskaitė (born 27 January 2003) is a retired Lithuanian ice dancer. With her skating partner, Deividas Kizala, she competed at the 2022 Winter Olympics.

== Career ==
=== Early years ===
As a singles skater, Ramanauskaitė won the Lithuanian national junior title in 2017–2018 and the senior title in 2019. She represented Lithuania at three ISU Championships — the 2018 World Junior Championships, 2019 World Junior Championships, and 2019 European Championships.

=== Partnership with Kizala ===
In 2020, Ramanauskaitė teamed up with Deividas Kizala Paulina to compete in senior ice dancing. The two made their international debut in December 2020, at the Winter Star in Minsk, Belarus.

Although Allison Reed / Saulius Ambrulevičius qualified a spot for Lithuania in ice dancing at the 2022 Winter Olympics, Reed's application for Lithuanian citizenship was unsuccessful. Following this decision, Ramanauskaitė/Kizala were nominated to fill the spot and placed 23rd at the Olympics.

Ramanauskaitė/Kizala were entered to compete in the 2025 World Championships. However, less than two weeks before the competition, they withdrew after Kizala fractured his leg while running and was in too much pain to continue training.

Ramanauskaitė announced her retirement from competitive skating on June 24, 2026.

== Programs ==
=== With Kizala ===
Season	Rhythm dance	Free dance	Exhibition
2024–2025	These Boots Are Made for Walkin'; Money (That's What I Want) by The Supremes choreo. by Kirill Khaliavin, Sara Hurtado, Oscar Munoz	Heaven Knows by Chase & Status ft. Elli Ingram choreo. by Kirill Khaliavin, Sara Hurtado, Oscar Munoz	
2023–2024	I Love Rock 'n' Roll; Crimson and Clover by Joan Jett and the Blackhearts; Call Me by Blondie choreo. by Kirill Khaliavin, Sara Hurtado	En Contra by MLNGA CLUB; Duo de amor by Astor Piazzolla	Highway to Hell by AC/DC; Still Got the Blues by Gary Moore; Demon Fire by AC/DC
2022–2023	Samba: La Vida Es Un Carnaval performed by Celia Cruz; Rhumba: Sway by Pérez Prado, Rosemary Clooney; Samba: Magalenha by Sérgio Mendes	Highway to Hell by AC/DC; Still Got the Blues by Gary Moore; Demon Fire by AC/DC	
2021–2022	Blues: Russian Roulette by Rihanna; Hip Hop: Hard by Rihanna	Lighthouse by Patrick Watson; Hoodoo by Muse	
2020–2021	Top Hat; Overture; Puttin' On the Ritz; Let's Face the Music and Dance	Raudoni Vakarai by Ieva Narkutė; Dark Creatures by Cœur de pirate	

=== Women's singles ===
Season	Short program	Free skating
2019–2020	La cena (from La califfa) by Ennio Morricone	Je suis malade performed by Lara Fabian
2018–2019	Diferente by Gotan Project	Je suis malade performed by Lara Fabian
2017–2018	Bei Mir Bistu Shein by Sholom Secunda	Epilogue

== Competitive highlights ==
- GP – Event of the ISU Grand Prix Series
- JGP – Event of the ISU Junior Grand Prix Series
- CS – Event of the ISU Challenger Series
- TBD – Assigned
- WD – Withdrew from competition
- C – Event was cancelled

=== Ice dance with Deividas Kizala ===
Competition placements at senior level
Season	2020–21	2021–22	2022–23	2023–24	2024–25
Winter Olympics		23rd			
World Championships			26th	31st	WD
European Championships			17th	16th	19th
Lithuanian Championships	2nd	2nd			
CS Budapest Trophy					10th
CS Finlandia Trophy		15th	8th		
CS Golden Spin of Zagreb				10th	
CS Lombardia Trophy			9th		
CS Nepela Memorial				14th	
CS Tallinn Trophy					11th
CS Warsaw Cup		19th			
Bosphorus Cup				5th	
Britannia Cup			4th		
Ice Star	4th				
NRW Trophy		4th			
Trophée Métropole Nice		11th		2nd	
Winter University Games			11th		

=== Single skating ===
International
Event	17–18	18–19	19–20
Europeans		32nd	
CS Golden Spin		14th	
International: Junior
Junior Worlds	43rd	41st	
JGP Belarus	25th		
JGP Lithuania		9th	
JGP Poland	16th		28th
JGP Slovenia		12th	
Bavarian Open	17th		
Challenge Cup	7th		
Ice Star	4th		
NRW Trophy		2nd	
Volvo Open Cup	6th		
National
Lithuanian Champ.	1st J	1st	

== Detailed results ==
=== Ice dance with Deividas Kizala ===
ISU personal best scores in the +5/-5 GOE System
Segment	Type	Score	Event
Total	TSS	156.91	2023 CS Golden Spin of Zagreb
Rhythm dance	TSS	62.52	2024 CS Budapest Trophy
Rhythm dance	TES	34.93	2024 CS Budapest Trophy
Rhythm dance	PCS	27.72	2024 CS Tallinn Trophy
Free dance	TSS	94.57	2023 CS Golden Spin of Zagreb
Free dance	TES	52.37	2023 CS Golden Spin of Zagreb
Free dance	PCS	42.60	2024 CS Budapest Trophy

Results in the 2020-21 season
Date	Event	RD		FD		Total	
Date	Event	P	Score	P	Score	P	Score
Dec 11-13, 2020	(Belarus) 2020 Ice Star	4	64.04	4	88.64	4	152.68

Results in the 2021-22 season
Date	Event	RD		FD		Total	
Date	Event	P	Score	P	Score	P	Score
Oct 7-10, 2021	(Finland) 2021 CS Finlandia Trophy	15	52.87	15	72.92	15	125.79
Oct 20-24, 2021	(France) 2021 Trophée Métropole Nice Côte d'Azur	11	50.11	11	69.76	11	119.87
Nov 4-7, 2021	(Germany) 2021 NRW Trophy	4	56.17	4	82.92	4	139.09
Nov 18-20, 2021	(Poland) 2021 CS Warsaw Cup	19	53.15	19	79.88	19	133.03
Feb 7-20, 2022	(China) 2022 Olympics	23	58.35	-	-	23	58.35

Results in the 2022-23 season
Date	Event	RD		FD		Total	
Date	Event	P	Score	P	Score	P	Score
Aug 26-28, 2022	(United Kingdom) 2022 Britannia Cup	4	58.37	4	85.69	4	144.06
Sep 13-19, 2022	(Italy) 2024 CS Lombardia Trophy	9	55.20	9	91.18	9	146.38
Oct 6-9, 2022	(Finland) 2022 CS Finlandia Trophy	8	54.50	7	80.47	8	134.97
Jan 12-16, 2023	(United States) 2023 World University Games	9	55.29	12	77.11	11	132.40
Jan 23-29, 2023	(Finland) 2023 European Championships	16	55.06	17	81.14	17	136.20
Mar 22-26, 2023	(Hungary) 2024 World Championships	26	58.06	-	-	26	58.06

Results in the 2023-24 season
Date	Event	RD		FD		Total	
Date	Event	P	Score	P	Score	P	Score
Sep 28-30, 2023	(Slovakia) 2023 CS Nepela Memorial	14	52.30	14	81.86	14	134.16
Oct 18-22, 2023	(France) 2023 Trophée Métropole Nice Côte d'Azur	2	58.13	3	84.25	2	142.38
Nov 27 - Dec 3, 2023	(Turkey) 2023 Bosphorus Cup	6	64.83	5	106.20	5	171.03
Dec 6-9, 2023	(Croatia) 2023 CS Golden Spin of Zagreb	9	62.34	10	94.57	10	156.91
Jan 8-14, 2024	(Lithuania) 2024 European Championships	20	60.76	16	94.09	16	154.85
Mar 18-24, 2024	(Canada) 2024 World Championships	31	58.32	-	-	31	58.32

Results in the 2024–25 season
Date	Event	RD		FD		Total	
Date	Event	P	Score	P	Score	P	Score
Oct 11-13, 2024	(Hungary) 2024 CS Budapest Trophy	10	62.52	11	93.49	10	156.01
Nov 11-17, 2024	(Hungary) 2024 CS Tallinn Trophy	12	670.02	11	91.64	11	151.66
Jan 28 – Feb 2, 2025	(Estonia) 2025 European Championships	18	61.56	19	95.50	19	157.06
