= Figure skating at the 2022 Winter Olympics – Ice dance =

Ice dance at the XXIV Olympic Winter Games
- Venue: Capital Indoor Stadium; Beijing, China
- Dates: 12 and 14 February 2022
- Competitors: 23 teams from 17 nations
- Winning score: 226.98 points

Medalists
1st place, gold medalist(s)		Gabriella Papadakis and Guillaume Cizeron	France
2nd place, silver medalist(s)		Victoria Sinitsina and Nikita Katsalapov	ROC
3rd place, bronze medalist(s)		Madison Hubbell and Zachary Donohue	United States

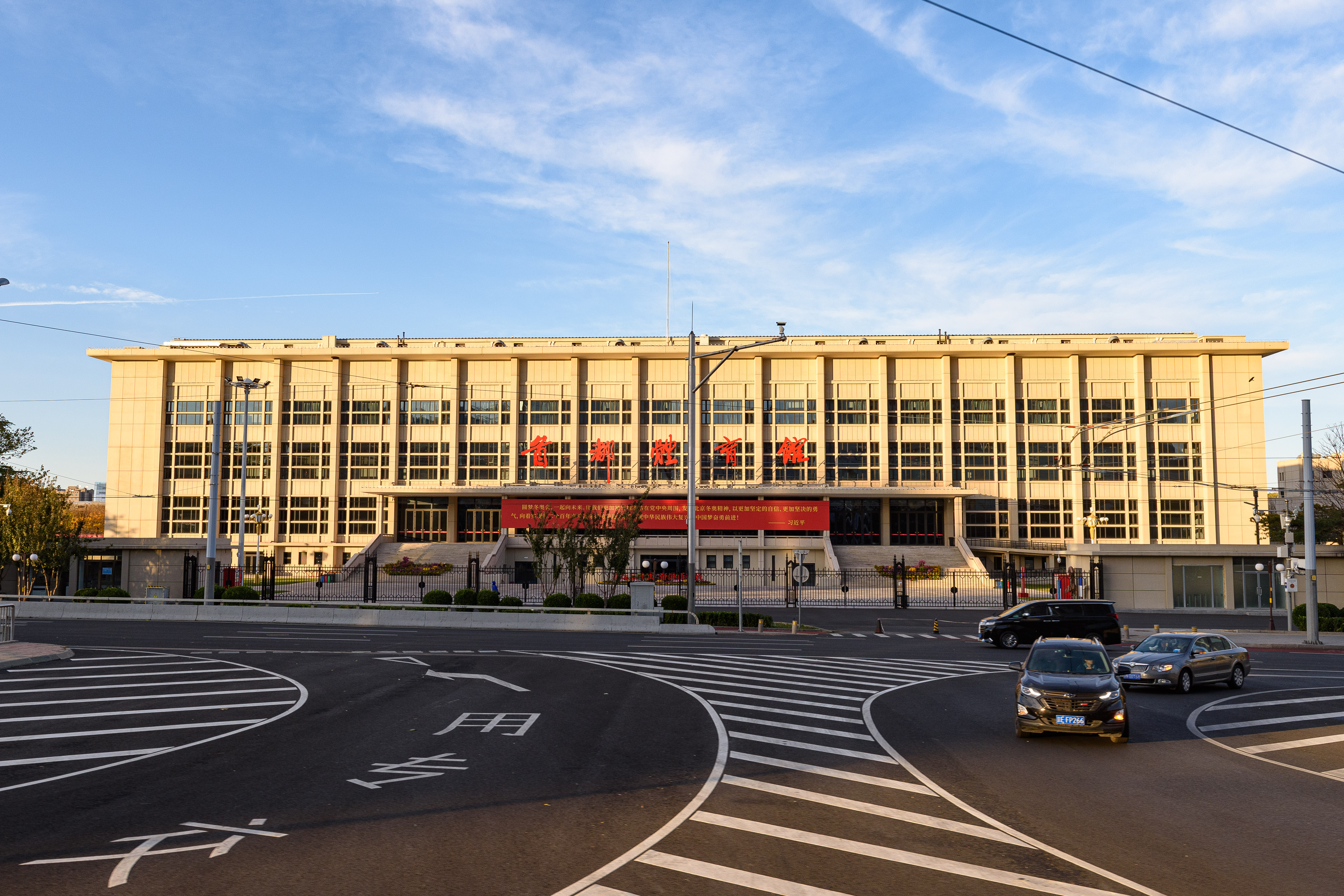
The figure skating events at the 2022 Winter Olympics were held at the Capital Indoor Stadium in Beijing, China.

The ice dance competition at the 2022 Winter Olympics was held on 12 and 14 February at the Capital Indoor Stadium in Beijing, China, and featured 23 teams from 17 different nations. Gabriella Papadakis and Guillaume Cizeron of France won the gold medals, Victoria Sinitsina and Nikita Katsalapov, representing the Russian Olympic Committee, won the silver, and Madison Hubbell and Zachary Donohue of the United States won the bronze. In addition to their gold medal victory, Papadakis and Cizeron also set new world record scores in both the rhythm dance and overall total score.

== Background ==
In 2016, an independent report commissioned by the World Anti-Doping Agency (WADA) confirmed allegations that the Russian Olympic team had been involved in a state-sponsored doping program from at least late 2011 through February 2014, when Russia hosted the Winter Olympics in Sochi. On 9 December 2019, the WADA banned Russia from all international competitions after it found that data provided by the Russian Anti-Doping Agency had been manipulated by Russian authorities in order to protect athletes involved in its doping scheme. Under a ruling by the Court of Arbitration for Sport in December 2020, Russian athletes could not use the Russian flag or anthem in international competition and had to compete as "Neutral Athletes" or a "Neutral Team" at any world championships for the next two years. On 19 February 2021, it was announced that Russian athletes would compete under the name of the Russian Olympic Committee (ROC) at the 2020 Summer Olympics and 2022 Winter Olympics.

The ice dance competition at the 2022 Winter Olympics was held at the Capital Indoor Stadium in Beijing, China, on 12 and 14 February. The competition featured 23 teams representing 17 nations. In ice dance, the scores at the Olympics are typically consistent with the scores throughout the season; as a result, Gabriella Papadakis and Guillaume Cizeron of France, and Victoria Sinitsina and Nikita Katsalapov of Russia, were considered the leading medal contenders, with Papadakis and Cizeron seen as the favorites to win. Papadakis and Cizeron had won the silver at the 2018 Winter Olympics, while Sinitsina and Katsalapov had won the 2021 World Figure Skating Championships. Papadakis and Cizeron, meanwhile, had opted to not compete at the 2021 World Championships.

The 2022 Winter Olympics took place over two years into the COVID-19 pandemic and most events were closed to the public, with only selected events open to invited guests at a reduced capacity. To minimize the risk of virus transmission, China implemented strict health and safety measures, including a closed-loop system that segregated participants from the general public, frequent testing, and quarantine protocols for participants. Amid increasing lockdowns across China and the first detected case of the Omicron variant in Beijing, ticket sales to the general public were cancelled and it was announced that limited numbers of spectators would be admitted by invitation only.

== Qualification ==
Nineteen quota spots in ice dance were awarded based on the results at the 2021 World Figure Skating Championships. An additional four quota spots were earned at the 2021 Nebelhorn Trophy.

Qualifying nations in ice dance
Event	Teams per NOC	Qualifying NOCs	Total teams
2021 World Championships	3	ROC; United States; Canada	19
2021 World Championships	1	Italy; Great Britain; Spain; Poland; China; Lithuania; France; Germany; Japan; Ukraine	19
2021 Nebelhorn Trophy	1	Finland; Georgia; Armenia; Czech Republic	4
Total			23

== Required performance elements ==
Couples competing in ice dance performed their rhythm dances on 12 February. Lasting no more than 2 minutes 50 seconds, the theme of the rhythm dance this season was "street dance rhythms". Examples of applicable dance styles included hip-hop, disco, swing, krump, popping, funk, jazz, reggae (reggaeton), and blues. The required pattern dance element was the Midnight Blues. The rhythm dance had to include the following elements: the pattern dance, the pattern dance step sequence, one dance lift, one set of sequential twizzles, and one step sequence.

The twenty highest scoring teams after the rhythm dance performed their free dances on 14 February. The free dance could last no longer than 4 minutes, and had to include the following: three dance lifts, one dance spin, one set of synchronized twizzles, one step sequence in hold, one step sequence while on one skate and not touching, and three choreographic elements, of which one had to be a choreographic character step sequence.

== Judging ==
Skaters were judged according to the required technical elements of their program (such as choreographic elements), as well as the overall presentation of their program, based on five program components (skating skills, transitions, performance, composition, and musical interpretation). Each technical element in a figure skating performance was assigned a predetermined base point value and scored by a panel of nine judges on a scale from −5 to +5 based on the quality of its execution. Each Grade of Execution (GOE) from −5 to +5 was assigned a value as indicated on the Scale of Values. (Note: The International Skating Union had originally published a new Scale of Values for the 2020/21 season, but chose to cancel it, reverting back to the scale from the 2019/20 season.) For example, a curve lift (level 4) was worth a base value of 5.30 points, and a GOE of +3 was worth 1.37 points, so a curve lift (level 4) with a GOE of +3 earned 6.67 points. The judging panel's GOE for each element was determined by calculating the trimmed mean (the average after discarding the highest and lowest scores). The panel's scores for all elements were added together to generate a Total Elements Score. At the same time, the judges evaluated each performance based on the five aforementioned program components and assigned each a score from 0.25 to 10 in 0.25-point increments. The judging panel's final score for each program component was also determined by calculating the trimmed mean. Those scores were then multiplied by the factor shown on the chart below; the results were added together to generate a total Program Component Score.

Program component factoring
Discipline	Rhythm dance	Free dance
Ice dance	0.80	1.20

Deductions were applied for certain violations, such as time infractions or falls. The Total Elements Score and Program Component Score were then added together, minus any deductions, to generate a final performance score for each team.

== Results ==
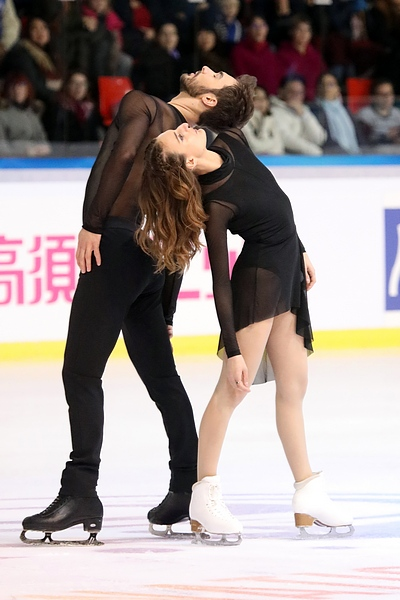
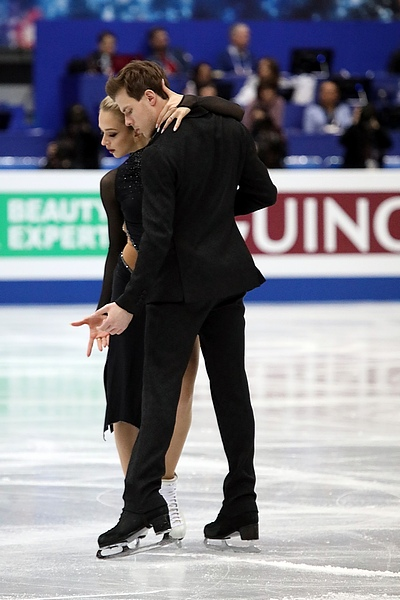
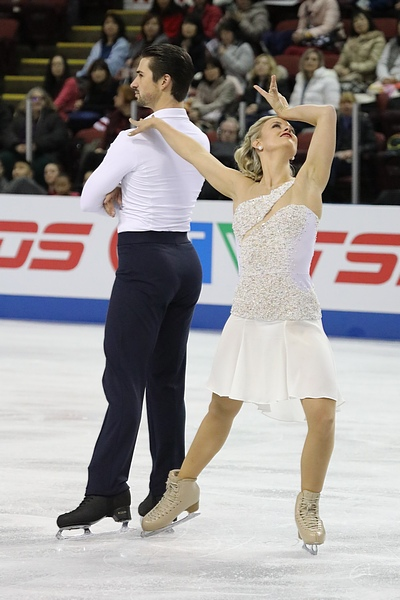
The gold, silver, and bronze medalists from the ice dance event at the 2022 Winter Olympics (from left to right):
Gabriella Papadakis and Guillaume Cizeron of France (gold); Victoria Sinitsina and Nikita Katsalapov of Russia (silver); and Madison Hubbell and Zachary Donohue of the United States (bronze)

Code key

- TSS – Total Segment Score
- TES – Total Elements Score
- PCS – Program Component Score
- SS – Skating skills
- TR – Transitions
- PE – Performance
- CO – Composition
- IN – Musical interpretation/Timing
- DED – Deductions

=== Rhythm dance ===
The rhythm dance was held on 12 February. Gabriella Papadakis and Guillaume Cizeron of France set a new world record in the rhythm dance, beating the previous highest score, which they had set at the 2019 NHK Trophy. "These Olympics are so different from four years ago," Cizeron said, referring to the 2018 Winter Olympics, where they had won the silver. "We are in a very different place. I think with all the experience we've gained, we have become more mature. We know better what we are doing, so we are enjoying it better." Victoria Sinitsina and Nikita Katsalapov of Russia, who had won the 2021 World Championships, finished in second place, improving on the score they had received in the team event by nearly four points. Madison Hubbell and Zachary Donohue of the United States finished in third place, while Madison Chock and Evan Bates, also of the United States, finished in fourth.

Rhythm dance results
Pl.	Team	Nation	TSS	TES	PCS	SS	TR	PE	CO	IN	DED
1	Gabriella Papadakis; Guillaume Cizeron	France	90.83	51.65	39.18	9.71	9.61	9.86	9.82	9.96	0.00
2	Victoria Sinitsina; Nikita Katsalapov	ROC	88.85	50.26	38.59	9.64	9.46	9.71	9.68	9.75	0.00
3	Madison Hubbell; Zachary Donohue	United States	87.13	48.82	38.31	9.61	9.36	9.64	9.64	9.64	0.00
4	Madison Chock; Evan Bates	United States	84.14	46.39	37.75	9.36	9.25	9.50	9.57	9.50	0.00
5	Alexandra Stepanova; Ivan Bukin	ROC	84.09	47.09	37.00	9.18	9.00	9.32	9.32	9.43	0.00
6	Piper Gilles; Paul Poirier	Canada	83.52	46.17	37.35	9.32	9.18	9.46	9.36	9.36	0.00
7	Charlène Guignard; Marco Fabbri	Italy	82.68	45.85	36.83	9.14	9.04	9.32	9.29	9.25	0.00
8	Laurence Fournier Beaudry; Nikolaj Sørensen	Canada	78.54	43.89	34.65	8.68	8.46	8.71	8.71	8.75	0.00
9	Olivia Smart; Adrián Díaz	Spain	77.70	42.78	34.92	8.61	8.50	8.82	8.79	8.93	0.00
10	Lilah Fear; Lewis Gibson	Great Britain	76.45	41.70	34.75	8.54	8.43	8.82	8.79	8.86	0.00
11	Kaitlin Hawayek; Jean-Luc Baker	United States	74.58	40.80	33.78	8.36	8.21	8.54	8.50	8.61	0.00
12	Wang Shiyue; Liu Xinyu	China	73.41	40.16	33.25	8.29	8.14	8.43	8.39	8.32	0.00
13	Marjorie Lajoie; Zachary Lagha	Canada	72.59	39.67	32.92	8.18	8.00	8.36	8.32	8.29	0.00
14	Diana Davis; Gleb Smolkin	ROC	71.66	39.31	32.35	7.96	7.86	8.21	8.11	8.29	0.00
15	Natalia Kaliszek; Maksym Spodyriev	Poland	70.32	39.51	30.81	7.57	7.57	7.71	7.86	7.79	0.00
16	Juulia Turkkila; Matthias Versluis	Finland	68.23	38.14	31.09	7.79	7.54	7.93	7.79	7.82	1.00
17	Natálie Taschlerová; Filip Taschler	Czech Republic	67.22	37.07	30.15	7.57	7.29	7.57	7.61	7.64	0.00
18	Maria Kazakova; Georgy Reviya	Georgia	67.08	37.17	29.91	7.43	7.21	7.54	7.57	7.64	0.00
19	Tina Garabedian; Simon Proulx-Sénécal	Armenia	65.87	35.57	30.30	7.57	7.36	7.71	7.61	7.61	0.00
20	Oleksandra Nazarova; Maksym Nikitin	Ukraine	65.53	35.44	30.09	7.54	7.50	7.50	7.50	7.57	0.00
21	Katharina Müller; Tim Dieck	Germany	65.47	35.56	29.91	7.43	7.29	7.64	7.54	7.50	0.00
22	Misato Komatsubara; Tim Koleto	Japan	65.41	35.58	29.83	7.46	7.25	7.54	7.54	7.50	0.00
23	Paulina Ramanauskaitė; Deividas Kizala	Lithuania	58.35	32.49	25.86	6.57	6.18	6.61	6.54	6.43	0.00

=== Free dance ===
The free dance was held on 14 February. Gabriella Papadakis and Guillaume Cizeron won the free dance and the overall competition, setting a new world record with their total score of 226.98, which was six points ahead of silver medalists Victoria Sinitsina and Nikita Katsalapov. Simon Reed, who provided the on-air commentary for the European broadcast, said of their performance: "For four minutes, it was exactly at the point where art and sport met, the pinnacle of entertainment, in the most important competition in their lives". Reed went on to add: "They lost in Pyeongchang [at the 2018 Winter Olympics] by under a mark, but here they've decimated the field." Papadakis and Cizeron had finished in second place at the 2018 Winter Olympics with less than a point separating them from gold medalists Tessa Virtue and Scott Moir of Canada. Reed finished his comments by saying that Papadakis and Cizeron were "as fine an ice dance couple as there has been in history".

Having previously announced that they were retiring at the end of the season, Madison Hubbell and Zachary Donohue finished in third place, winning the bronze medals. Madison Chock and Evan Bates finished in fourth place with a free dance where Chock portrayed an alien and Bates an astronaut. "Our program is deeply rooted in the message of accepting and finding love with someone who is different than you," Chock stated in an interview. "It's important for us to have that message behind our program every season, and especially in the Olympic season, when we feel we have the opportunity to ... inspire others around the world."

Free dance results
Pl.	Team	Nation	TSS	TES	PCS	SS	TR	PE	CO	IN	DED
1	Gabriella Papadakis; Guillaume Cizeron	France	136.15	76.75	59.40	9.82	9.79	9.96	10.00	9.93	0.00
2	Victoria Sinitsina; Nikita Katsalapov	ROC	131.66	73.43	58.23	9.71	9.61	9.75	9.71	9.75	0.00
3	Madison Hubbell; Zachary Donohue	United States	130.89	73.56	58.33	9.75	9.57	9.82	9.68	9.79	1.00
4	Madison Chock; Evan Bates	United States	130.63	72.59	58.04	9.50	9.54	9.68	9.89	9.75	0.00
5	Charlène Guignard; Marco Fabbri	Italy	124.37	69.22	55.15	9.14	9.07	9.29	9.21	9.25	0.00
6	Olivia Smart; Adrián Díaz	Spain	121.41	67.71	53.70	8.75	8.68	9.14	9.11	9.07	0.00
7	Piper Gilles; Paul Poirier	Canada	121.26	66.19	55.07	9.14	9.04	9.21	9.21	9.29	0.00
8	Alexandra Stepanova; Ivan Bukin	ROC	120.98	65.34	55.64	9.25	9.18	9.18	9.46	9.29	0.00
9	Lilah Fear; Lewis Gibson	Great Britain	115.19	63.21	51.98	8.50	8.39	8.82	8.79	8.82	0.00
10	Kaitlin Hawayek; Jean-Luc Baker	United States	115.16	62.99	52.17	8.61	8.54	8.75	8.68	8.89	0.00
11	Laurence Fournier Beaudry; Nikolaj Sørensen	Canada	113.81	61.05	52.76	8.75	8.61	8.86	8.86	8.89	0.00
12	Wang Shiyue; Liu Xinyu	China	111.01	61.34	50.67	8.39	8.25	8.54	8.50	8.54	1.00
13	Marjorie Lajoie; Zachary Lagha	Canada	108.43	58.93	49.50	8.18	7.96	8.39	8.36	8.36	0.00
14	Diana Davis; Gleb Smolkin	ROC	108.16	59.77	48.39	7.89	7.75	8.25	8.25	8.18	0.00
15	Juulia Turkkila; Matthias Versluis	Finland	105.65	58.07	47.58	7.82	7.54	8.14	8.11	8.04	0.00
16	Tina Garabedian; Simon Proulx-Sénécal	Armenia	101.16	55.74	45.42	7.54	7.32	7.71	7.64	7.64	0.00
17	Natálie Taschlerová; Filip Taschler	Czech Republic	101.10	55.42	45.68	7.68	7.39	7.64	7.71	7.64	0.00
18	Oleksandra Nazarova; Maksym Nikitin	Ukraine	97.34	52.30	45.04	7.43	7.39	7.46	7.61	7.64	0.00
19	Maria Kazakova; Georgy Reviya	Georgia	97.25	52.21	45.04	7.43	7.39	7.43	7.71	7.57	0.00
20	Natalia Kaliszek; Maksym Spodyriev	Poland	96.99	54.26	44.73	7.32	7.46	7.32	7.64	7.54	2.00

=== Overall ===
Ice dance results
Rank	Team	Nation	Total	RD		FD	
1st place, gold medalist(s)	Gabriella Papadakis; Guillaume Cizeron	France	226.98	1	90.83	1	136.15
2nd place, silver medalist(s)	Victoria Sinitsina; Nikita Katsalapov	ROC	220.51	2	88.85	2	131.66
3rd place, bronze medalist(s)	Madison Hubbell; Zachary Donohue	United States	218.02	3	87.13	3	130.89
4	Madison Chock; Evan Bates	United States	214.77	4	84.14	4	130.63
5	Charlène Guignard; Marco Fabbri	Italy	207.05	7	82.68	5	124.37
6	Alexandra Stepanova; Ivan Bukin	ROC	205.07	5	84.09	8	120.98
7	Piper Gilles; Paul Poirier	Canada	204.78	6	83.52	7	121.26
8	Olivia Smart; Adrián Díaz	Spain	199.11	9	77.70	6	121.41
9	Laurence Fournier Beaudry; Nikolaj Sørensen	Canada	192.35	8	78.54	11	113.81
10	Lilah Fear; Lewis Gibson	Great Britain	191.64	10	76.45	9	115.19
11	Kaitlin Hawayek; Jean-Luc Baker	United States	189.74	11	74.58	10	115.16
12	Wang Shiyue; Liu Xinyu	China	184.42	12	73.41	12	111.01
13	Marjorie Lajoie; Zachary Lagha	Canada	181.02	13	72.59	13	108.43
14	Diana Davis; Gleb Smolkin	ROC	179.82	14	71.66	14	108.16
15	Juulia Turkkila; Matthias Versluis	Finland	173.88	16	68.23	15	105.65
16	Natálie Taschlerová; Filip Taschler	Czech Republic	168.32	17	67.22	17	101.10
17	Natalia Kaliszek; Maksym Spodyriev	Poland	167.31	15	70.32	20	96.99
18	Tina Garabedian; Simon Proulx-Sénécal	Armenia	167.03	19	65.87	16	101.16
19	Maria Kazakova; Georgy Reviya	Georgia	164.33	18	67.08	19	97.25
20	Oleksandra Nazarova; Maksym Nikitin	Ukraine	162.87	20	65.53	18	97.34
21	Katharina Müller; Tim Dieck	Germany	65.47	21	65.47	Did not advance to free dance	
22	Misato Komatsubara; Tim Koleto	Japan	65.41	22	65.41	Did not advance to free dance	
23	Paulina Ramanauskaitė; Deividas Kizala	Lithuania	58.35	23	58.35	Did not advance to free dance	

== Records ==
The following new record high scores were set during this event.

Record high scores
Date	Team	Segment	Score	Ref.
12 February	(France); Gabriella Papadakis; Guillaume Cizeron	Rhythm dance	90.83	
14 February	(France); Gabriella Papadakis; Guillaume Cizeron	Total score	226.98	

== Works cited ==
- "Special Regulations & Technical Rules – Single & Pair Skating and Ice Dance 2021". International Skating Union. Archived from the original on 4 April 2022.
