= Adrián Díaz =

Spanish ice dancer

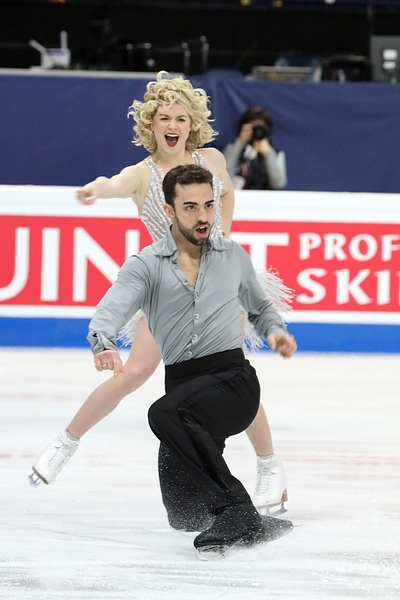
- Olivia Smart and Adrián Díaz at the 2017 World Championships

Personal information
- Full name: Adrián Díaz Bronchud
- Other names: Adrià Díaz
- Born: 17 September 1990 (age 36) Barcelona, Spain
- Height: 1.72 m (5 ft 8 in)

Figure skating career
- Country: Spain
- Discipline: Ice dance
- Partner: Olivia Smart (2016–22); Sara Hurtado (2008–15)
- Began skating: 1995
- Retired: May 23, 2022

Medal record
Spanish Championships
Gold medal – first place	2009 Logroño	Ice dance
Gold medal – first place	2012 Jaca	Ice dance
Gold medal – first place	2013 Majadahonda	Ice dance
Gold medal – first place	2014 Jaca	Ice dance
Gold medal – first place	2015 Granada	Ice dance
Gold medal – first place	2018 Jaca	Ice dance
Gold medal – first place	2020 San Sebastián	Ice dance
Gold medal – first place	2022 Jaca	Ice dance
Silver medal – second place	2017 Vielha	Ice dance
Silver medal – second place	2019 Logroño	Ice dance

Adrián (or Adrià) Díaz Bronchud (born 17 September 1990) is a Spanish skating coach and retired competitive ice dancer. Initially rising to prominence on the international scene partnered with Sara Hurtado, the duo won six senior international medals and five Spanish national titles and were the first dance team to represent Spain in ISU competition. They qualified for the Olympic Games, finishing thirteenth at the 2014 Winter Olympics in Sochi, and achieving their best ISU Championship result when they placed fifth at the 2015 European Championships.

Following the end of his partnership with Hurtado, Díaz formed a new partnership with English ice dancer Olivia Smart, with whom he was the 2021 Skate Canada International bronze medalist, a four-time Challenger Series medalist, and a three-time Spanish national champion. Smart/Díaz represented Spain at the 2022 Winter Olympics and finished seventh in their final performance at the 2022 World Championships before he retired from the sport.

== Personal life ==
Adrián Díaz was born on 17 September 1990 in Barcelona. He studied sports science at university. He formerly competed as Adrià Díaz but prefers to be called Adrián or Adri. He began dating American ice dancer Madison Hubbell in 2014. The couple announced their engagement in April 2018. They got married on June 7, 2023, in Vilanova i la Geltrú, Spain.

== Skating career ==
=== Early years ===
Díaz started skating in 1995. After skating in singles, he became interested in switching to ice dance in 2006 and asked a fellow single skater, Sara Hurtado, to go with him to a summer camp organized by the Spanish federation (FEDH) with French coach Romain Haguenauer. Hurtado said, "We begged the Federation for two years, please, please, we want to do ice dance." In early 2008, FEDH hired British coach John Dunn to teach ice dancing in Madrid.

=== Ice dance with Sara Hurtado ===
==== 2008–09 season ====
Hurtado/Díaz began competing together internationally in the 2008–09 season. Their first major international event was the 2009 World Junior Championships in Sofia, Bulgaria, where they finished thirty-second.

==== 2009–10 season ====
Hurtado/Díaz competed in two events on the Junior Grand Prix circuit and finished sixteenth at the 2010 World Junior Championships in The Hague, Netherlands.

==== 2010–11 season ====
Hurtado/Díaz competed on the Junior Grand Prix circuit while participating in several senior internationals. They finished fifteenth at the 2011 European Championships in Bern, Switzerland, won a bronze medal at the Bavarian Open and finished fourth at the Winter Universiade.

They placed ninth at the World Junior Championships in Gangneung, South Korea. They then competed in Moscow, Russia, at their first senior World Championships; although the two qualified for the short dance out of the preliminary round, they were unable to reach the free dance portion of the event.

==== 2011–12 season ====
Hurtado/Díaz moved to London, England, in mid-2011 after Dunn accepted a coaching job in his native country. In November, they competed at their first-ever Grand Prix event, the 2011 Trophée Éric Bompard, where they placed eighth (last). In December 2011, they ended their relationship with Dunn and relocated to Montreal, Quebec, Canada, to train under Marie-France Dubreuil and Patrice Lauzon.

Ranked twelfth in the short dance and seventeenth in the free dance, Hurtado/Díaz finished sixteenth at the 2012 European Championships in Sheffield, England. They qualified to the free dance at the 2012 World Championships in Nice, France, and finished nineteenth overall.

==== 2012–13 season ====
Hurtado/Díaz did not compete on the Grand Prix series. They placed fifteenth at the 2013 European Championships in Zagreb, Croatia, and nineteenth at the 2013 World Championships in London, Ontario, Canada.

==== 2013–14 season: Sochi Olympics ====
At the 2013 Nebelhorn Trophy, Hurtado/Díaz became the first ice dancers to qualify for an Olympic entry for Spain. They had no Grand Prix assignments. In January 2014, they finished tenth at the 2014 European Championships in Budapest, Hungary, allowing Spain to send two ice dancing teams to the next Europeans.

One month later, Hurtado/Díaz competed at the Winter Olympics in Sochi, Russia; they set personal best scores in both segments and finished in thirteenth place. They ended their season with a sixteenth-place result at the 2014 World Championships in Saitama.

==== 2014–15 season ====
Returning to the Grand Prix series, Hurtado/Díaz placed eighth at the 2014 Skate Canada International and 4th at the 2014 Trophée Éric Bompard. They then achieved career-best ISU Championship results, finishing fifth with a new personal best score at the 2015 European Championships in Stockholm, Sweden, and then fourteenth at the 2015 World Championships in Shanghai, China.

==== 2015–16 season ====
Hurtado/Díaz were invited to two Grand Prix events – the 2015 Trophée Éric Bompard and the 2015 Rostelecom Cup. However, on 16 October 2015, Hurtado announced on her personal Facebook page that she had decided to end the partnership. In a later interview, Hurtado stated that their partnership had experienced problems for some time and that therapy had not helped resolve these issues.

=== Ice dance with Olivia Smart ===
==== 2016–17 season ====
On 13 December 2015, it was announced that Díaz would represent Spain with British ice dancer Olivia Smart and that they would train in Montreal, Quebec, Canada. On 15 January 2016, Smart announced that the British skating association had released her.

Making their international debut, Smart/Díaz took silver behind Pogrebinsky/Benoit at the Lake Placid Ice Dance International in late July 2016. They later competed at three ISU Challenger Series events, placing fourth at the 2016 U.S. International Classic, sixth at the 2016 CS Autumn Classic International, and sixth at the 2016 CS Finlandia Trophy, before winning gold at the Open d'Andorra.

Smart/Díaz finished second to Hurtado and her new partner Kirill Khaliavin at the Spanish Championships. As a result, they were not nominated for the 2017 European Championships.

Smart/Díaz took silver in February at the Bavarian Open. Later that month, Federación Española Deportes de Hielo (FEDH) selected them to compete at the 2017 World Championships, the main Olympic-qualifying competition. The two placed 16th in the short dance, 19th in the free dance, and 18th overall at the event in Helsinki, Finland. Their result allowed Spain to send one ice dancing team to the Olympics.

==== 2017–18 season ====
In July 2017, FEDH announced that Spain's Olympic spot would go to the team which received the highest combined score at the 2017 CS Golden Spin of Zagreb and Spanish Championships.

Smart/Díaz began their season on the Challenger Series, placing seventh at the 2017 U.S. International Figure Skating Classic and fourth at the 2017 Autumn Classic International. Making their Grand Prix debut, they placed sixth at the 2017 Skate Canada International in October. In December, they placed fifth at the 2017 CS Golden Spin of Zagreb, scoring 4.18 points less than Hurtado/Khaliavin. Later that month, they won the Spanish national title by a 3.23-point margin, resulting in a final deficit of 0.95 points. On 17 December 2017, FEDH announced that Hurtado/Khaliavin would compete at the European Championships and Olympics while Smart/Díaz would be assigned to the 2018 World Championships. They finished twelfth at the event in Milan, Italy.

==== 2018–19 season ====
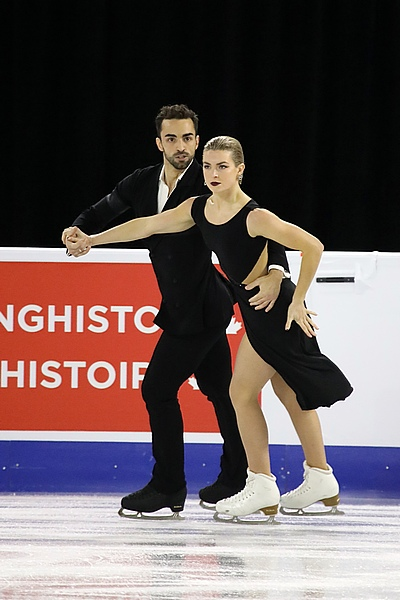
Smart and Díaz at the 2018 Skate Canada International

Smart/Díaz began their season at the Autumn Classic International Challenger Series event, where they placed second behind Canadians Weaver/Poje. At the onset of the 2018–19 season, they were assigned to two Grand Prix events, the Skate Canada and Internationaux de France, finishing fifth at the former and seventh at the latter.

After winning the silver medal at the Spanish Championships, finishing behind Hurtado/Khaliavin, they placed eighth at the 2019 European Championships.

==== 2019–20 season ====
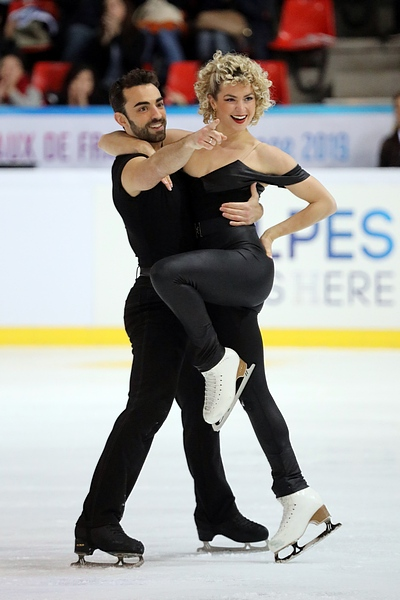
Smart and Díaz at the 2019 Internationaux de France

Smart/Díaz began the season with a victory at the 2019 Lake Placid Ice Dance International and then placed fourth at the 2019 CS Autumn Classic International. At their first Grand Prix assignment, 2019 Skate America, they placed fourth, with three new personal bests set. Smart/Díaz concluded the Grand Prix with another fourth-place finish at the 2019 Internationaux de France.

After winning the Spanish national title for the second time, they finished eighth at the 2020 European Championships, below Hurtado/Khaliavin in seventh place. Despite this, they were assigned to compete at the World Championships in Montreal, but these were cancelled as a result of the coronavirus pandemic.

==== 2020–21 season ====
Smart/Díaz were assigned to the 2020 Skate Canada International, but this event was also cancelled due to the pandemic.

While Smart/Díaz were listed on the preliminary entry list for the 2021 World Championships, the Spanish Ice Sports Federation announced on March 2 that the final determination as to which team would represent Spain would be made following a virtual skate-off between them and Hurtado/Khaliavin. On March 7, the Spanish federation announced that the berth had been awarded to Hurtado/Khaliavin.

==== 2021–22 season: Beijing Olympics ====
Smart/Díaz began the Olympic season at the 2021 CS Autumn Classic International, where they won the silver medal, setting new personal best scores in the free dance and overall in the process. They beat domestic rivals Hurtado/Khaliavin by 0.25 points in the first of three matchups to determine which team would be named to the Spanish Olympic team. They then came fourth at their second event, the 2021 CS Finlandia Trophy.

Competing on the Grand Prix at the 2021 Skate America, they placed fourth in the rhythm dance, 1.27 points behind Canadian training partners Fournier Beaudry/Sørensen. They came third in the free dance but remained fourth overall by 0.54 points. Their Zorro free dance received a standing ovation from the audience, with Smart commenting that the "reaction of the crowd made it all worthwhile and so memorable." The following week at their second Grand Prix, 2021 Skate Canada International, they were third in both segments of the competition, winning the bronze medal, their first Grand Prix medal.

Smart/Díaz faced off against Hurtado/Khaliavin at the 2022 Spanish Championships and won both segments of the competition to take the gold medal with a score of 202.47, with a margin of 8.12 points over their silver medalist rivals, expanding their cumulative margin to 8.37 points. Both teams then went to the 2022 European Championships, the third and final competition for the Spanish Olympic berth. Smart/Díaz were fifth in the rhythm dance and moved up to fourth overall with a fourth-place free dance, despite a technical fall on their ending pose. Smart remarked that this season was "the hardest we've ever worked for anything. It's not only been this competition; it has been the whole season that we gave everything we had." Hurtado/Khaliavin finished in sixth place, 4.96 points back. With a cumulative margin of 13.33 points, Smart/Díaz were subsequently named to Spain's Olympic team.

Competing at the 2022 Winter Olympics in the dance event, Smart/Díaz placed ninth in the rhythm dance. They skated a new personal best in the free dance, breaking 120 points in the segment for the first time with a score of 121.41. Due to errors by higher-ranked teams Fournier Beaudry/Sørensen, Gilles/Poirier and Stepanova/Bukin they were sixth in that segment and rose to eighth overall.

Smart/Díaz finished their season at the 2022 World Championships, held in Montpellier. Russian dance teams were absent due to the International Skating Union banning all Russian athletes due to their country's invasion of Ukraine. They finished seventh, the highest ever result for a Spanish team, and finally achieving the Spanish federation's long-desired goal of earning two berths for Spanish dance teams at the World Championships.

On May 23, the Spanish federation announced that Díaz was retiring from competitive skating.

== Coaching career ==
On June 23, 2022, the Ice Academy of Montreal announced that Díaz would be working at their London, Ontario campus as a coach and choreographer alongside former training partner Scott Moir and wife, Madison Hubbell.

His current and former students include:

- (Canada) Charlie Anderson / Cayden Dawson
- (Canada) Nadiia Bashynska / Noé Perron
- (United States) Christina Carreira / Anthony Ponomarenko
- (Italy) Leia Dozzi / Pietro Papetti
- (United States) Isabella Flores / Linus Colmor Jepsen
- (Canada) Lily Hensen / Nathan Lickers
- (United Kingdom) Layla Karnes / Liam Carr
- (Canada) Marie-Jade Lauriault / Romain Le Gac
- (United States) Elliana Peal / Ethan Peal
- (Azerbaijan) Samantha Ritter / Daniel Brykalov
- (Canada) Alyssa Robinson / Jacob Portz
- (Canada) Haley Sales / Nikolas Wamsteeker
- (Belgium) Olivia Josephine Shilling / Leo Baeten
- (Canada) Layla Veillon / Alexander Brandys
- (Japan) Utana Yoshida / Masaya Morita

As a choreographer, his clients have included:

- (Canada) Éliane Foroglou-Gadoury / Luke Anderson
- (Canada) Lia Pereira / Trennt Michaud
- (Canada) Emmanuelle Proft / Nicolas Nadeau
- (Canada) Madeline Schizas
- (Japan) Utana Yoshida / Masaya Morita

== Programs ==
=== Ice dance with Olivia Smart ===
Season	Short dance	Free dance	Exhibition
2021–2022	Blues: Proud Mary; Swing: Proud Mary performed by Tina Turner	I Was Always There (from Puss in Boots) by Henry Jackman; The Fencing Lesson (from The Mask of Zorro) by James Horner; I Want to Spend My Lifetime Loving You (from The Mask of Zorro) by Tina Arena & Marc Anthony; The Plaza of Execution (from The Mask of Zorro) by James Horner	Maniac (from Flashdance) by Dennis Matkovsky, Michael Sembello performed by Michael Sembello
2020–2021	Swing: Grease performed by Frankie Valli; Quickstep: You're the One That I Want performed by John Travolta & Olivia Newton-John; Jive: Born to Hand Jive performed by Sha Na Na (from Grease)	Power of Imagination (from Fantasia) by Leopold Stokowski	
2019–2020	Swing: Grease performed by Frankie Valli; Swing: Greased Lightnin' performed by John Travolta; Quickstep: You're the One That I Want performed by John Travolta & Olivia Newton-John; Jive: Born to Hand Jive performed by Sha Na Na (from Grease)	Larrons en Foire (from Micmacs) by Raphaël Beau; My One and Only Love by Guy Wood, Robert Mellin performed by Thomas Hanreich	Maniac (from Flashdance) by Dennis Matkovsky, Michael Sembello performed by Michael Sembello
2018–2019	Tango: A Evaristo Carriego performed by Orquestra Color Tango	A Day in the Life by Jeff Beck; Something; Let It Be by The Beatles	
2017–2018	Rhumba: One to Eight; Cha Cha: Rhumba; Merengue: Bailar by DJ Deorro feat. Elvis Crespo	It's a Man's Man's Man's World by James Brown, Betty Jean Newsome performed by Seal; Composition by Karl Hugo; (You Make Me Feel Like) A Natural Woman by Gerry Goffin, Carole King, Jerry Wexler performed by Amanda Brown	Proud Mary by John Fogerty covered by Tina Turner
2016–2017	Blues and Jive Proud Mary by John Fogerty covered by Tina Turner	Experience by Ludovico Einaudi; Circles (Experience remix) by Ludovico Einaudi, Greta Svabo Bech; Composition by Karl Hugo	

=== Ice dance with Sara Hurtado ===
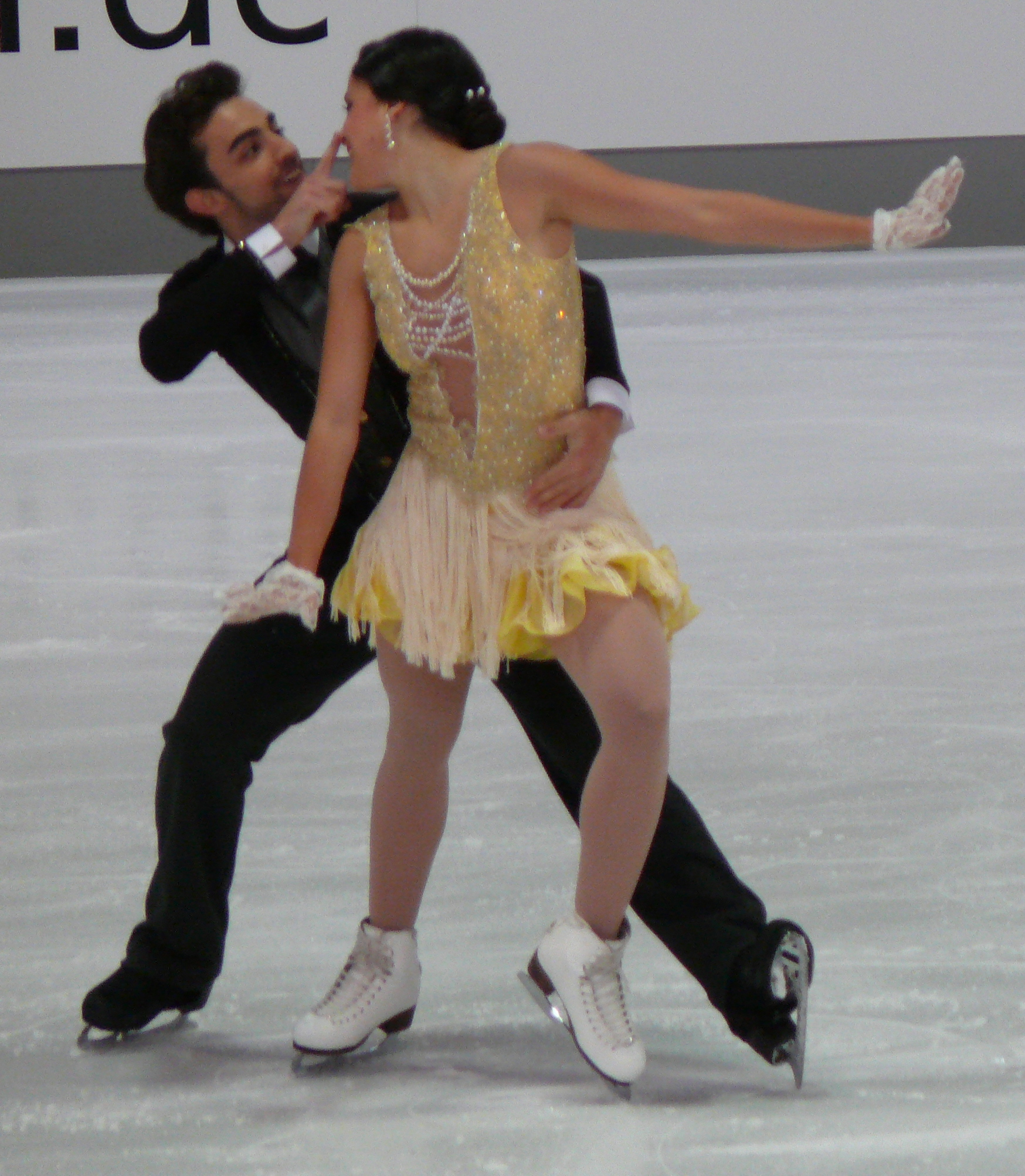
Hurtado and Díaz at the 2012 Nebelhorn Trophy.

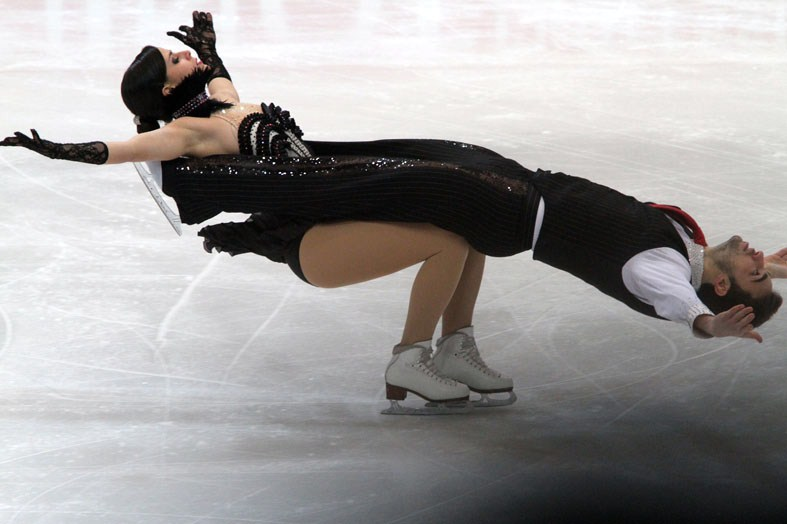
Hurtado and Díaz perform a lift at the 2011 European Championships.

Season	Short dance	Free dance	Exhibition
2015–2016	I Put a Spell on You performed by Nina Simone; I Put a Spell on You (Profetesa Smooth Dubstep Remix); Anything to Say You're Mine by Sonny Thompson; Spoonful by Willie Dixon performed by Etta James	Vesper by New Tango Orquesta; Nostalgia by Pasión Vega	
2014–2015	Paso doble: Tercio de Quites by Rafael Talens; Flamenco: Almoraima by Paco de Lucía; Flamenco: Alfileres de colores by Miguel Poveda; choreo. by Antonio Najarro	Meditation (from "Zumanity" - Cirque du Soleil); Atonement by Dario Marianelli; Original composition by Karl Hugo	Paso doble: Tercio de Quites by Rafael Talens; Flamenco: Almoraima by Paco de Lucía; Flamenco: Alfileres de colores by Miguel Poveda; Surviving Picasso by Richard Robbins; Le di a la caza alcance by Estrella Morente
2013–2014	Quickstep: Steppin' Out With My Baby (from "Insongniac") by Tim Draxl; Foxtrot: Boardwalk Empire; Charleston	Surviving Picasso by Richard Robbins; Le di a la caza alcance by Estrella Morente	
2012–2013	Waltz: Jane's Waltz; Polka: Modern Times	Little Wing; Pride and Joy by Stevie Ray Vaughan	
2011–2012	Mas que nada; Magalenha by Sérgio Mendes	Tristan & Iseult by Maxime Rodriguez	
2010–2011	Algo pequeñito by Daniel Diges; Ein Wiener Walzer by Karl Jenkins	Be Italian (from Nine) performed by Fergie	
	Original dance		
2009–2010	Granada by Paco de Lucía	Slumdog Millionaire by A. R. Rahman	
2008–2009	In the Mood by Glenn Miller; Summertime	300 by Tyler Bates	

== Competitive highlights ==
- GP – Event of the ISU Grand Prix Series
- JGP – Event of the ISU Junior Grand Prix Series
- CS – Event of the ISU Challenger Series
- C – Event was cancelled
- WD – Withdrew from competition

=== Ice dance with Olivia Smart ===
Competition placements at senior level
Season	2016–17	2017–18	2018–19	2019–20	2021–22
Winter Olympics					8th
World Championships	18th	12th		C	7th
European Championships			8th	8th	4th
Spanish Championships	2nd	1st	2nd	1st	1st
GP France			7th	4th	
GP Skate America				4th	4th
GP Skate Canada		6th	5th		3rd
CS Autumn Classic	6th	4th	2nd	4th	2nd
CS Cup of Austria					3rd
CS Finlandia Trophy	6th		2nd		4th
CS Golden Spin of Zagreb		5th			
CS Nebelhorn Trophy				5th	
CS U.S. Classic	4th	7th			
Bavarian Open	2nd				
Lake Placid Ice Dance	2nd			1st	
Open d'Andorra	1st				

=== Ice dance with Sara Hurtado ===
Competition placements at senior level
Season	2008–09	2010–11	2011–12	2012–13	2013–14	2014–15
Winter Olympics					13h	
World Championships		23rd	19th	19th	16th	14th
European Championships		15th	16th	15th	10th	5th
Spanish Championships	1st		1st	1st	1st	1st
GP Skate Canada						8th
GP Trophée Éric Bompard			8th			4th
CS Autumn Classic						5th
CS Golden Spin of Zagreb		11th	8th		5th	3rd
Bavarian Open		3rd				
Cup of Nice			3rd		2nd	
Mentor Toruń Cup					2nd	
Nebelhorn Trophy			7th	9th	8th	
NRW Trophy			6th			
Trophy of Lyon				2nd		
Winter Universiade		4th			8th	2nd

Competition placements at junior level
Season	2008–09	2009–10	2010–11
World Junior Championships	32nd	16th	9th
Spanish Championships		1st	1st
JGP Germany			5th
JGP Great Britain			10th
JGP South Africa	9th		
JGP Spain	WD		
JGP Turkey		6th	
JGP United States		10th	
Bavarian Open	4th	1st	
European Youth Olympic Festival		7th	
NRW Trophy		6th	8th

== Detailed results ==
=== Ice dance with Olivia Smart ===
2021–22 season
Date	Event	RD	FD	Total
March 21–27, 2022	2022 World Championships	6; 79.40	7; 115.23	7; 194.63
February 12–14, 2022	2022 Winter Olympics	9; 77.70	6; 121.41	8; 199.11
January 10–16, 2022	2022 European Championships	5; 77.99	4; 118.87	4; 196.86
December 16–19, 2021	2021 Spanish Championships	1; 80.70	1; 121.77	1; 202.47
November 11–14, 2021	2021 CS Cup of Austria	2; 78.53	3; 111.35	3; 189.88
October 29–31, 2021	2021 Skate Canada International	3; 76.97	3; 115.96	3; 192.93
October 22–24, 2021	2021 Skate America	4; 74.06	3; 115.63	4; 189.69
October 7–10, 2021	2021 CS Finlandia Trophy	5; 72.67	5; 113.15	4; 185.82
September 16–18, 2021	2021 CS Autumn Classic International	2; 75.20	2; 116.11	2; 191.31
2019–20 season
Date	Event	RD	FD	Total
January 20–26, 2020	2020 European Championships	9; 72.19	8; 110.93	8; 183.12
December 13–15, 2019	2019 Spanish Championships	1; 80.07	1; 118.26	1; 198.33
November 1–3, 2019	2019 Internationaux de France	4; 76.09	4; 112.09	4; 188.18
October 18–20, 2019	2019 Skate America	4; 76.62	4; 114.39	4; 191.01
September 12–14, 2019	2019 Autumn Classic International	4; 70.63	4; 110.88	4; 181.51
30 July - 2 August 2019	2019 Lake Placid Ice Dance International	4; 70.11	1; 114.51	1; 184.62
2018–19 season
Date	Event	RD	FD	Total
21–27 January 2019	2019 European Championships	6; 70.02	9; 106.82	8; 176.84
14–16 December 2018	2018 Spanish Championships	1; 69.86	2; 108.82	2; 178.68
23–25 November 2018	2018 Internationaux de France	5; 68.16	8; 97.53	7; 165.69
26–28 October 2018	2018 Skate Canada International	3; 72.35	5; 104.22	5; 176.57
4–7 October 2018	2018 CS Finlandia Trophy	2; 72.61	2; 107.46	2; 180.07
20–22 September 2018	2018 CS Autumn Classic	2; 67.35	2; 104.06	2; 171.41
2017–18 season
Date	Event	SD	FD	Total
19–25 March 2018	2018 World Championships	12; 63.73	12; 98.32	12; 162.05
15–17 December 2017	2017 Spanish Championships	1; 69.61	2; 98.16	1; 167.77
6–9 December 2017	2017 CS Golden Spin of Zagreb	5; 63.12	5; 96.28	5; 159.40
27–29 October 2017	2017 Skate Canada International	4; 64.34	7; 90.47	6; 154.81
20–23 September 2017	2017 CS Autumn Classic	5; 61.18	4; 93.88	4; 155.56
13–17 September 2017	2017 US Classic	8; 48.15	6; 83.98	7; 132.13
2016–17 season
Date	Event	SD	FD	Total
29 March – 2 April 2017	2017 World Championships	16; 60.93	19; 84.68	18; 145.61
14–19 February 2017	2017 Bavarian Open	2; 67.52	2; 104.18	2; 171.70
16–20 November 2016	2016 Open d'Andorra	1; 63.47	1; 100.93	1; 164.40
6–10 October 2016	2016 Finlandia Trophy	6; 55.89	6; 86.23	6; 142.12
28 Sept. – 1 Oct. 2016	2016 CS Autumn Classic	5; 56.10	6; 85.40	6; 141.50
14–18 September 2016	2016 US Classic	3; 57.12	5; 81.22	4; 138.34
28–29 July 2016	2016 Lake Placid IDI	2; 62.32	2; 83.17	2; 145.49
