= Figure skating at the 2011 Winter Universiade – Ice dancing =

Figure skating at the 2011 Winter Universiade included an ice dancing event for senior level skaters. The short dance was held on February 1 and the free dance on February 3, 2011.

== Results ==
| Rank | Name | Nation | Total points | SD | | FD | |
|---|---|---|---|---|---|---|---|
| 1 | Kristina Gorshkova / Vitali Butikov | Russia | 135.53 | 1 | 54.30 | 1 | 81.23 |
| 2 | Alisa Agafonova / Alper Uçar | Turkey | 127.13 | 4 | 49.58 | 2 | 77.55 |
| 3 | Nadezhda Frolenkova / Mikhail Kasalo | Ukraine | 121.96 | 8 | 47.90 | 3 | 74.06 |
| 4 | Sara Hurtado / Adriá Diaz | Spain | 118.57 | 5 | 48.48 | 4 | 70.09 |
| 5 | Louise Walden / Owen Edwards | United Kingdom | 118.56 | 3 | 49.89 | 5 | 68.67 |
| 6 | Lorenza Alessandrini / Simone Vaturi | Italy | 117.63 | 2 | 50.21 | 8 | 67.42 |
| 7 | Zoé Blanc / Pierre-Loup Bouquet | France | 115.78 | 6 | 48.19 | 7 | 67.59 |
| 8 | Dóra Turóczi / Balázs Major | Hungary | 112.00 | 10 | 43.76 | 6 | 68.24 |
| 9 | Irina Babchenko / Vitali Nikiforov | Ukraine | 107.69 | 9 | 44.25 | 9 | 63.44 |
| 10 | Lesia Valadzenkava / Vitali Vakunov | Belarus | 97.89 | 12 | 38.49 | 10 | 59.40 |
| 11 | Guan Xueting / Wang Meng | China | 97.83 | 11 | 38.49 | 11 | 59.34 |
| 12 | Su Yingying / Zhang Yu | China | 88.54 | 13 | 36.04 | 13 | 52.50 |
| 13 | Xenia Chepizhko / Sergei Shevchenko | Ukraine | 85.85 | 15 | 28.83 | 12 | 57.02 |
| WD | Angelina Telegina / Valentin Molotov | Russia | | 7 | 47.96 | | |
| WD | Zhang Yiyi / Wu Nan | China | | 14 | 34.96 | | |
