= Elli Ingram =

- Born: Brighton, England
- Genres: R&B; soul; jazz; Hip hop
- Occupation: Singer-songwriter
- Years active: 2013–present
- Labels: MTA Records; Island Records; Believe Music
- Website: elliingram.com

Elli Ingram is an English singer-songwriter from Brighton. Her musical style is influenced by Amy Winehouse, Lauryn Hill, Aretha Franklin and Erykah Badu.

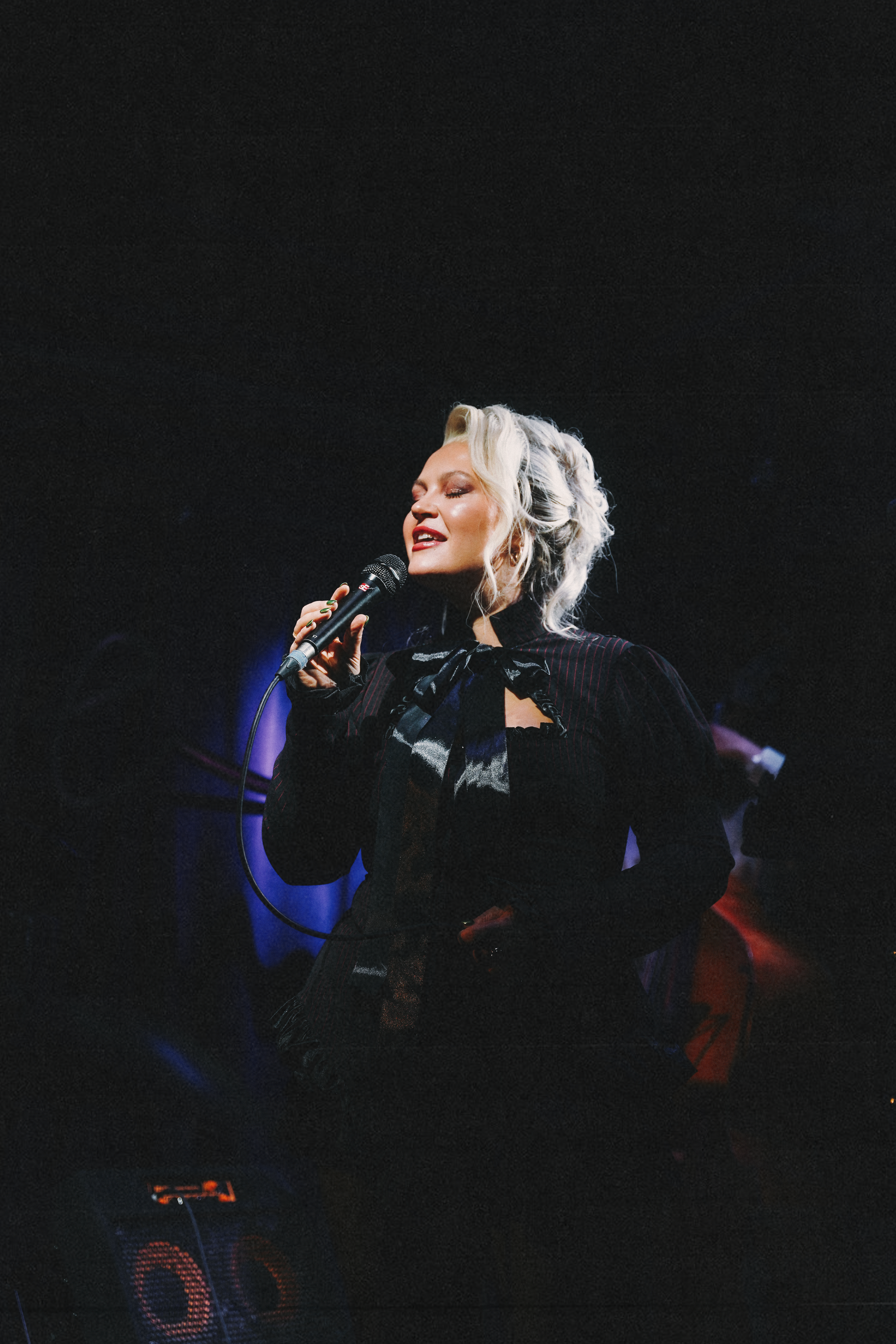

== Career ==
=== Early life ===
Elli Ingram was born in Brighton, England. She grew up in a very musical household. Her father performed in a band, her mother enjoyed listening to Joni Mitchell, Reggae and Ska, and her sister played the piano. At the age of 14, a teacher entered Ingram into a talent show which she won. At the age of 18, she began to post YouTube videos of song covers. Her cover of Kendrick Lamar's "Poetic Justice" has more than a million views.

=== 2013–present ===
In 2013, Ingram toured through Europe with the English drum 'n' bass duo Chase & Status and was featured on their album Brand New Machine. In July she released her first EP titled Sober through Chase & Status' MTA label as a free digital download. The EP earned a Best Newcomer nomination at the MOBO Awards and a music video for the song "Mad Love", directed by Emil Nava, was nominated for Best Pop Video at the UK Music Video Awards 2013.

In 2014, her second EP The Doghouse was released on Island Records. A promotional single titled "When It Was Dark" was also released, accompanied by a music video, once again directed by Emil Nava.

On 15 September 2017, Ingram's first album Love You Really was released. With it came a promotional music video by British art photographer and filmmaker Nadia Lee Cohen.

In May 2023 Ingram's long awaited 2nd album Bad Behaviour was released on her own label Pinc Records featuring album title Song Bad Behaviour, Flowers, No plan B, Growing Pains and Fools Gold as well as others on a 13 track album available to download as well as on white Vinyl. The Track Fools Gold features 2020 mobo award winner Mahalia.

== Discography ==
=== Albums ===
Title	Release Date	Format
Love You Really	September 2017	Vinyl LP, CD
Bad Behaviour	May 2023	Vinyl LP, CD

=== EPs ===
Title	Release Date	Format
Sober	July 2013	Digital download
The Doghouse	April 2014	Digital download, CD

=== Singles ===
Title	Release Date	Format
Bad Behaviour	February 2020	Digital download
Flowers	May 2020	Digital download
Heavy	October 2020	Digital download
Strange How Good Things Change	August 2021	Digital download
No Plan B	December 2022	Digital download
Growing Pains	January 2023	Digital download
Fool's Gold	March 2023	Digital download

=== Music videos ===
Year	Title	Director
2013	"Poetic Justice"	Harry Cauty
2013	"Mad Love"	Emil Nava
2014	"When It Was Dark"	Emil Nava
2014	"All Caught Up"	AJ Colomb
2017	"Table For Two"	Nadia Lee Cohen
