= Térez Montcalm =

Canadian jazz singer and songwriter (born 1963)

- Birth name: Thérèse Montcalm
- Born: 1963 (age 61–62); Quebec, Canada
- Genres: Jazz, pop, rock
- Occupation(s): Singer, musician
- Instrument(s): Vocals, guitar
- Years active: 1981–present
- Labels: EMI, Universal
- Website: terezmontcalm.net

Térez Montcalm (born Thérèse Montcalm in 1963) is a Canadian jazz singer and songwriter.

She sings and plays acoustic guitar, which she has played since a young age, as well as double bass. She describes herself as "a jazz singer with a very 'rock' attitude". Her influences include Jimi Hendrix, Elvis Presley, and Billie Holiday, and her music has been compared to that of Edith Piaf and Janis Joplin. Her career started in 1981. During her early years as a musician, she performed as a warm-up act for the Cowboy Junkies.

Her first album, Risque, was released in 1994 and she was nominated for five ADISQ awards in 1995. The tour following the release of the album consisted of over 100 shows in Canada and around Europe. Her second album, Parle Pas Si Fort, was brought out in 1997 and this was followed by an eponymous album in 2002. In 2006, she released the album Voodoo, her first sung in the English language. The album achieved a peak position of No. 43 in the French albums chart, and was on the chart for 30 weeks. Her 2009 album, Connection, fared even better in France, reaching a top position of No. 37 on 3 October 2009.

== Biography ==
Thérèse Montcalm was born in Quebec, Canada, in 1963. At the age of seven, she formed an ambition to forge a career out of singing after seeing the René Simard film Un enfant comme les autres. After being introduced to Jimi Hendrix and Elvis Presley by her brother, she took up acoustic guitar several years later. During her early musical life she opened for such artists as Cowboy Junkies and Robert Charlebois while working at Popico's theatre in Alberta. After a short period in Montreal as part of the duo Beaux Esprits in the autumn of 1993, Montcalm returned to Quebec and entered the recording studios to produce her début studio album. She released Risque in 1994, an album which featured performances from fourteen different musicians and earned her five Félix Award nominations in 1995, including Female Singer of the Year, and Best Pop/Rock Album. The album proved popular and was followed by a major tour consisting of over 100 concerts in Canada, France, Belgium and Switzerland.

Three years after the release of her first album, she released the record Parle Pas Si Fort in 1997 on Universal Records. The album was again followed by a tour, which was this time limited to shows in the area around Quebec. After the excessive amount of touring, Montcalm took a break from performing live and devoted the following three years to writing new material and practising the double bass. In February 2002, she released her third studio album, the eponymous Térez Montcalm.

For her fourth album, Montcalm hired jazz guitarist Michel Cusson as a producer. After four years without an album, she released Voodoo on 21 March 2006 in Canada. The album was her first to be sung in English; her previous three recordings had been in French. The album consisted of a mixture of original compositions, interpretations of jazz classics and adaptations of songs by such artists as Elton John and the Eurythmics. In November 2006, Dreyfus Records released the album in Europe. After entering the French albums chart at #150 over a year after its initial release, the record reached a peak position of #43 in May 2007. She embarked on a tour of Europe in the same year, playing over 150 dates in cities such as Paris, Milan and Rome. To date, Voodoo has sold more than 60,000 copies worldwide.

In 2008, Montcalm returned to the studio and again hired Cusson to produce her fifth album. Connection was released in her homeland on 10 February 2009. The album was brought out in Europe in the autumn of the same year and again achieved a respectable position in France, entering the albums chart at #37 in October 2009.

== Discography ==
Year	Album	Peak positions	Certification
Year	Album	FR	Certification
1994	Risque	–	
1997	Parle pas si fort	–	
2002	Térez Montcalm	–	
2007	Voodoo	43	
2009	Connection	37	
2011	Here's to You - Songs for Shirley Horn	141	
2013	I Know, I'll Be Alright	78	
2015	Quand on s'aime	–	

Others

- 2009: Cafe Elektric (Cusson, Mervil, Montcalm)
