= David Peña Dorantes =

Romani pianist and composer

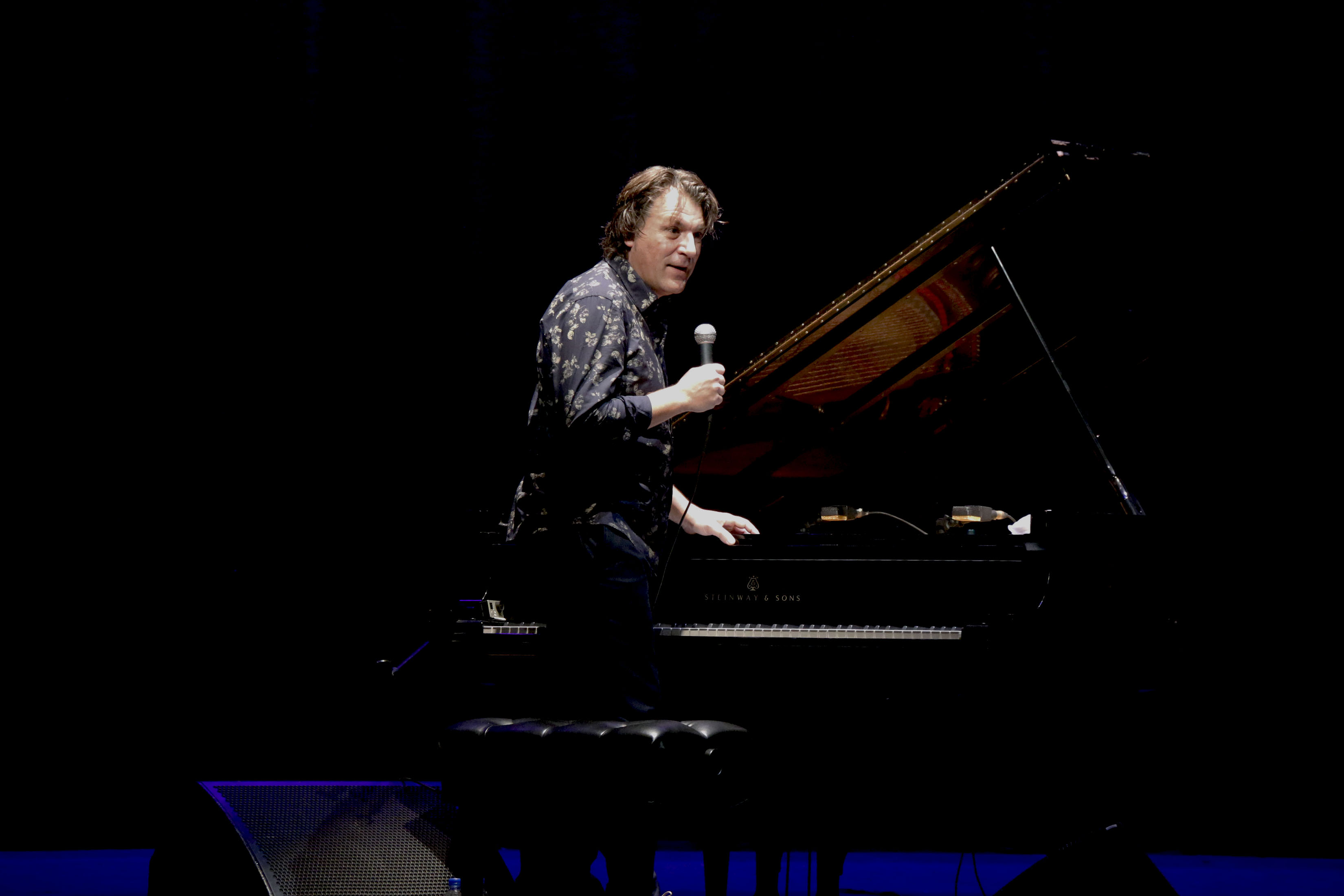
David Dorantes on stage in 2016.

David Peña Dorantes (born 1969) is a Spanish pianist and composer from Andalusia (Spain) known for his compositions and performances of flamenco. His music has been influenced by Debussy and jazz. His first album, Orobroy, released in 1998, received both critical and public acclaim. His second album, released in 2001 and titled Sur, was recorded in Paris, Sevilla, and Sofia, and was also well received. His third album, Without Walls!, was released in 2012. Dorantes has collaborated with prominent artists such as Lole Montoya, Alba Molina, Susheela Raman, El Barrio, Arcángel, Carmen Linares, Miguel Poveda, and José Mercé.

Dorantes is Romani.
