= Liu Xinyu =

Chinese ice dancer (born 1994)

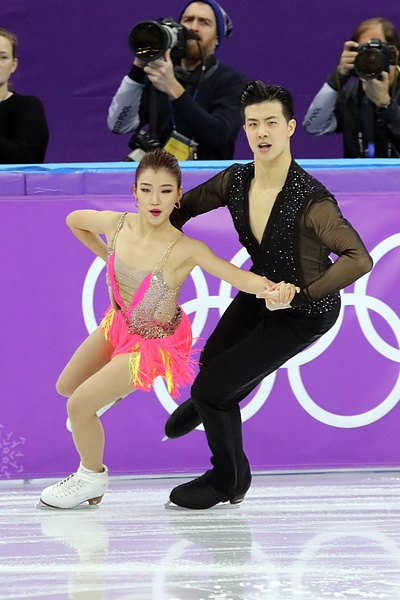
- Wang and Liu at 2018 Winter Olympics

Personal information
- Born: October 16, 1994 (age 31) Changchun, Jilin, China
- Height: 1.89 m (6 ft 2 in)

Figure skating career
- Country: China
- Partner: Wang Shiyue
- Coach: Patrice Lauzon; Pascal Denis; Huang Guiyu; Song Linshu
- Skating club: Jilin Winter Sports Management Center
- Began skating: 2000
Medal record
Figure skating: Ice dance
Representing China
Asian Winter Games
Gold medal – first place	2017 Sapporo	Ice dancing

Liu Xinyu (Chinese: 柳鑫宇; pinyin: Liǔ Xīnyǔ; Mandarin pronunciation: [ljòʊ ɕín ỳ]; born October 16, 1994) is a Chinese ice dancer. With his skating partner, Wang Shiyue, he is the 2017 Asian Winter Games champion, 2018 CS Asian Open champion, 2015 Toruń Cup champion, and four-time Chinese national champions (2015, 2018, 2019, 2020). They have competed in the final segment at four World Championships.

Wang/Liu at the 2018 Winter Olympics, 2022 Winter Olympics, and 2026 Winter Olympics.

== Controversies ==
On February 20, 2024, several posts on Liu's own Instagram account accused him of being involved in a series of misconducts, including sexual assault against minors, bribery of judges and officials, embezzling funds from China's national team and using marijuana. The posts showed details of these alleged misconducts and Liu's personal information. The publisher of the posts also threatened to expose illegal acts of officials of the national team and his home province Jilin.

The posts stirred controversies and heated discussions on Chinese internet. Wang Shiyue and Liu Xinyu later posted on Wang's Weibo account, claiming Liu's Instagram account was hacked to spread "false allegations", and saying they have reported the incident to the police.

Amid the allegations, Jilin Provincial Sports Bureau said it has initiated an investigation, and assured the public that multiple departments were engaged in verifying the authenticity of the claims.

== Programs ==
(with Wang)

Season	Short dance	Free dance	Exhibition
2025–26	Go Wild Alone by Andy Lau, Zhou Limao, & Yang Zhenlong; Flower Guardian by Hacken Lee, Hasegawa Shuhei, & Pan Weiyuan choreo. by Marie-France Dubreuil	The Batman Theme (from The Batman) by Krutikov Music; A Watchful Guardian (from The Dark Knight) by Hans Zimmer & James Newton Howard; The Batman Trailer Music (from The Batman) by Nirvana choreo. by Marie-France Dubreuil	Dedication (奉献) by Han Han
2023–24	Rock Me Amadeus by Falco choreo. by Marie-France Dubreuil	Forever from Now; The One that I Love by LP choreo. by Marie-France Dubreuil	Imperfect Child by TFBoys
2022–23	Cha Cha: Katchi Remix by Ofenbach vs. Nick Waterhouse; Samba: Bananeira (Banana Tree) by Sérgio Mendes ft. Mr. Vegas; Samba: Batucada choreo. by Marie-France Dubreuil, Romain Haguenauer	The Batman; Something in the Way by Krutikov Music; Sonata in the Darkness by Michael Giacchino; The Batman Trailer Music by Sh4d0wStrider choreo. by Marie-France Dubreuil, Romain Haguenauer	
2021–22	Blues: Trouble; Hip Hop: Blue Suede Shoes by Elvis Presley choreo. by Marie-France Dubreuil, Romain Haguenauer	Kung Fu Piano: Cello Ascends by The Piano Guys choreo. by Marie-France Dubreuil, Romain Haguenauer	Yi Jian Mei by Fei Yu-ching; I Love You, China by Bo Liang
2019–21	Quickstep: The Look-a-Like Contest; Waltz: Life Can Be Like the Movies from Chaplin by Christopher Curtis; Quickstep: Titine from Modern Times by Léo Daniderff; Quickstep: The Look-a-Like Contest from Chaplin by Christopher Curtis choreo. by Marie-France Dubreuil, Romain Haguenauer	Black Swan; Nina's Dream; Perfection; A Swan is Born by Clint Mansell choreo. by Marie-France Dubreuil, Romain Haguenauer	Yi Jian Mei by Fei Yu-ching; Wuji from The Untamed by Xiao Zhan and Wang Yibo
2018–19	Tango: Angelica; Tango: End Credits by Hans Zimmer	Meant by Elivazeta	
2017–18	Rhumba: Despacito; Samba	Over My Shoulder; Happy Ending by Mika	July by Kris Wu
2016–17	Blues: That's Why I Play The Blues; Swing: Mojo Boogie by Gary Moore	New York, New York by Ralph Burns	Don't Let Me Down by The Chainsmokers feat. Daya; Get Low by Dillon Francis and DJ Snake
2015–16	Waltz: Piano Man by Billy Joel; Foxtrot: Fever performed by Beyoncé	Crouching Tiger, Hidden Dragon; Night Fight by Yo-Yo Ma and Tan Dun; A Love Before Time by Coco Lee; Fury, Hammer, And Tongs (from Jade Empire) by Jack Wall	All of Me by John Legend
2014–15	Paso doble: A Bad Kitty; Paso doble: Farewell to San Ricardo by Henry Jackman; Flamenco: Diablo Rojo by Rodrigo y Gabriela	The Artist by Ludovic Bource; The Artist Ouverture; Waltz for Peppy; Peppy and George	All of Me by John Legend; Let Her Go by Passenger
2013–14	Foxtrot: Why Don't You Do Right?; Quickstep: Dancing Fool	The Cello Song	
2012–13	Blues: Feeling Good; Hip hop: Walk This Way	Rhapsody on a Theme of Paganini by Sergei Rachmaninoff	

== Competitive highlights ==
=== Ice dancing with Wang Shiyue ===
- GP – Event of the ISU Grand Prix Series
- CS – Event of the ISU Challenger Series
- TBD – Assigned
- WD – Withdrew from competition
- C – Event was cancelled
- Medals at team events are awarded for the team results only. Individual placements at team events are listed in parentheses.

Competition placements at senior level
Season	2013–14	2014–15	2015–16	2016–17	2017–18	2018–19	2019–20	2020–21	2021–22	2022–23	2023–24	2025–26
Winter Olympics					22nd				12th			21st
Winter Olympics (Team event)					6th				5th			9th
World Championships		19th	22nd	16th	18th	15th	C	13th			WD	
Four Continents Championships	9th	7th	9th	7th	5th	7th	4th			WD		9th
Chinese Championships	3rd	1st			1st	1st	1st					
World Team Trophy		5th (5th)		5th (4th)								
GP Cup of China		6th	6th	6th	6th		4th	1st	C		WD	7th
GP Finland										9th		
GP Italy									4th			
GP NHK Trophy						6th	5th		WD	7th		
GP Skate America			8th		8th							
GP Skate Canada				9th		6th					10th	
CS Asian Open Trophy						1st			1st			
CS Autumn Classic						4th			WD			
CS Finlandia Trophy					7th		2nd					
CS Nebelhorn Trophy							6th					
CS Warsaw Cup		3rd										
Asian Winter Games				1st								
Cup of Nice					2nd							
Mentor Toruń Cup		1st				3rd	2nd					
National Winter Games			1st								1st	
Shanghai Trophy											3rd	
Skate to Milano												4th
Team Challenge Cup			3rd (5th)									
Universiade	13th											

==== 2009–10 to 2012–13 ====
Competition placements at senior level
Season	2009–10	2010–11	2011–12	2012–13
Chinese Championships	5th	5th	5th	2nd
National Winter Games			6th	
