= Yi jian mei =

Yi jian mei (一剪梅) may refer to:

- A Spray of Plum Blossoms, a 1931 Chinese film
- One Plum Blossom, a 1984 Taiwanese TV series
- Yi Jian Mei (song), a 1983 song by Fei Yu-ching which gained international popularity in 2020
