= Ekaterina Kurakova =

Russian-Polish figure skater (born 2002)

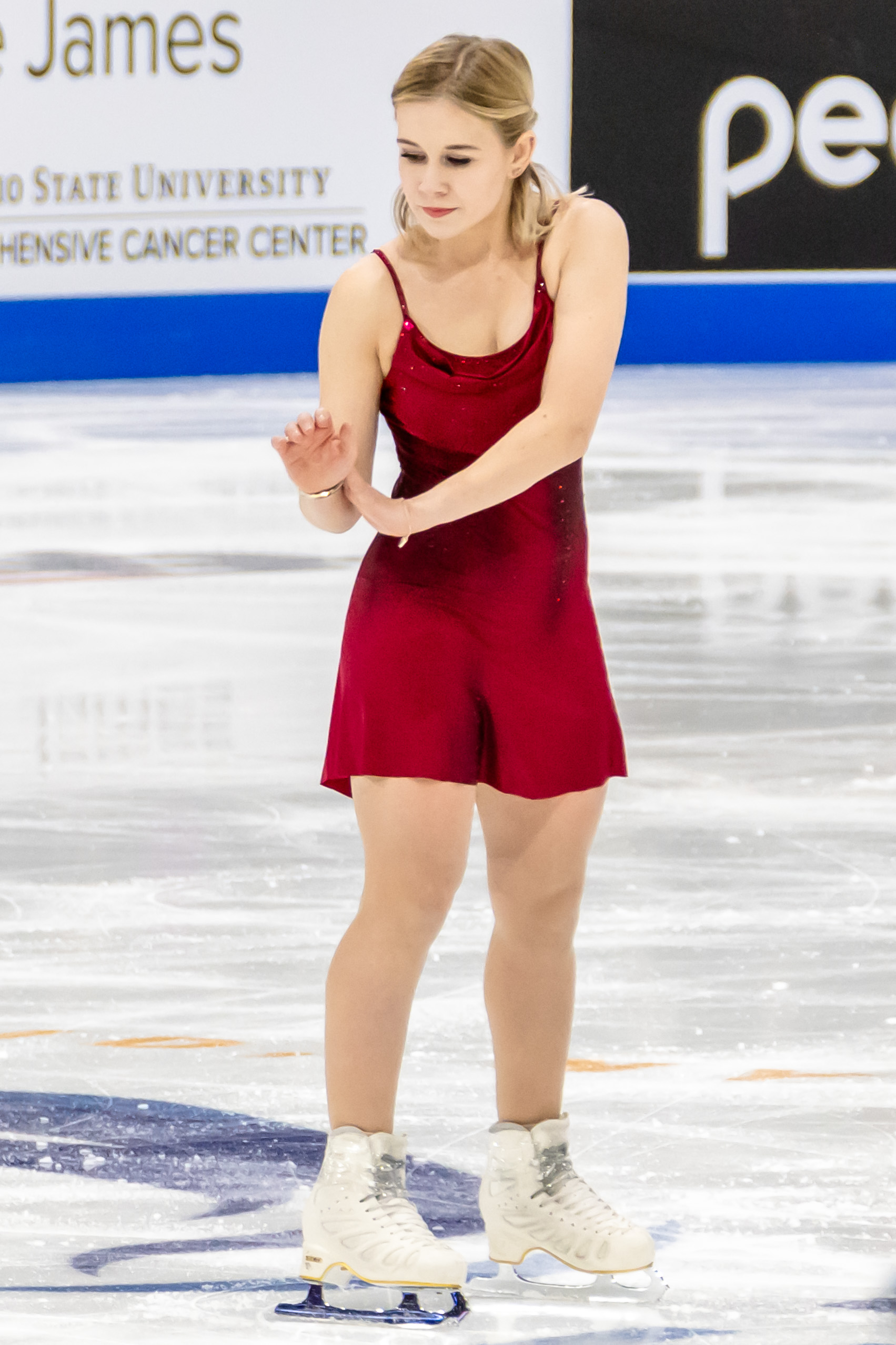
- Kurakova at the 2025 Skate America

Personal information
- Native name: Екатерина Андреевна Куракова
- Full name: Ekaterina Andreevna Kurakova
- Other names: Katia; Katya; Jekatierina Kurakowa
- Born: 24 June 2002 (age 24) Moscow, Russia
- Home town: Toruń, Poland
- Height: 1.53 m (5 ft 0 in)

Figure skating career
- Country: Poland (since 2018); Russia (2013–17)
- Discipline: Women's singles
- Coach: Florent Amodio; Dmitri Ignatenko
- Skating club: MKS Axel Toruń
- Began skating: 2006

Medal record
Representing Poland
Polish Championships
Gold medal – first place	2019 Budapest	Singles
Gold medal – first place	2020 Ostrava	Singles
Gold medal – first place	2021 Cieszyn	Singles
Gold medal – first place	2022 Spišská Nová Ves	Singles
Gold medal – first place	2023 Budapest	Singles
Gold medal – first place	2024 Turnov	Singles
Gold medal – first place	2025 Cieszyn	Singles
Gold medal – first place	2026 Presov	Singles

Ekaterina Andreevna Kurakova (Russian: Екатерина Андреевна Куракова, Polish: Jekatierina Andriejewna Kurakowa, born 24 June 2002), nicknamed Katia, is a Russian-Polish figure skater who currently competes for Poland. She is a three-time Warsaw Cup champion (2019, 2022, 2023), the 2019 Mentor Toruń Cup champion, a seven-time Four Nationals champion (2019–24, 2026), and an eight-time Polish national champion (2019–2026). Kurakova represented Poland at the 2022 and 2026 Winter Olympics.

== Personal life ==
Kurakova was born on 24 June 2002 in Moscow. She has an older brother named Alexander. In addition, she is trilingual in Russian, Polish, and English.

In October 2019, Kurakova became a Polish citizen. In 2025, she graduated from the Halina Konopacka College of Physical Culture and Tourism, earning a bachelor's degree.

== Career ==
=== Early career ===
Kurakova began learning to skate in 2006 at the age of four. She was coached first by Natalia Dubinskaya at the Moskvich Olympic Reserve School and later by Inna Goncharenko at CSKA Moscow. Representing Russia, she competed internationally in the advanced novice category for two seasons beginning in 2013–14 and then as a junior for two seasons.

According to Kurakova, due to the level of depth in Russian women's skating, Russian coaches tried encouraging her to quit figure skating. Ultimately, in the summer of 2017, Kurakova wrote a letter to Marek Kaliszek, the chairman of the Polish Figure Skating Association, requesting that she represent Poland, and her request was eventually accepted.

She soon began training in Toruń, coached by Sylwia Nowak-Trębacka. After receiving financial support from an unpublicized sponsor, she decided to move to Toronto to train under Brian Orser at the Toronto Cricket Club, beginning in December 2018. Later that month, she won the Four National Championships in Budapest, thus becoming the 2019 Polish national champion. However, due to the recent change of her country of representation, she could not compete in any ISU events until after June 2019.

=== 2019–2020 season: Senior international debut ===
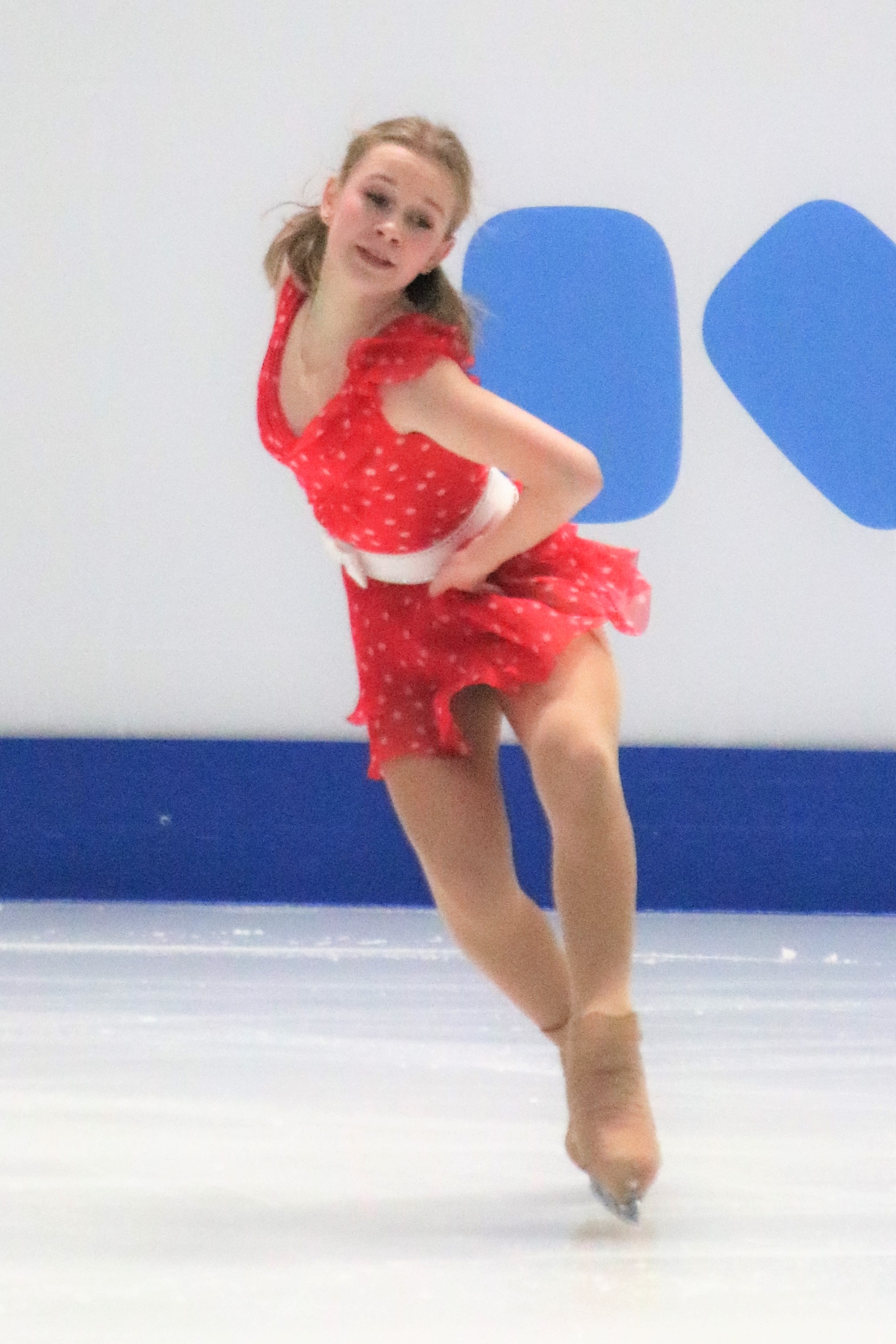
Kurakova performing her short program at the 2020 European Championships

On 1 July 2019, Kurakova received her clearance certificate, allowing her to officially represent Poland in international figure skating competitions and ISU championships.

In her international senior debut at the Minto Summer Skate in Ontario, Canada, she placed first, scoring 182.77 points overall. She then competed at two ISU Junior Grand Prix events, placing fifth in Riga and seventh in Gdańsk. In November, she won gold at the 2019 CS Warsaw Cup, ahead of Bradie Tennell. In December, she defended her national title at the Four National Championships in Ostrava.

Kurakova competed at her first European Championships in January, placing tenth. She finished the season at the 2020 World Junior Championships in Tallinn, Estonia, where she placed seventh. Kurakova remarked afterward, "I'm so happy because we did hard work with Brian, and it was important for me to show what Brian made for me. I'm really grateful to my coaches and parents." She was scheduled to make her senior World Championship debut in Montreal, but the event's cancellation due to the COVID-19 pandemic prevented this.

=== 2020–2021 season: World Championship debut ===
Due to the pandemic, Kurakova could not return to Canada to train in Toronto. She temporarily began training in Egna, Italy under Lorenzo Magri while receiving virtual coaching from Orser. Kurakova was assigned to compete at the 2020 Skate Canada International, but withdrew on 7 October.

After winning the Four National Championships for the third consecutive year, Kurakova made her World Championship debut in March at the 2021 World Championships in Stockholm. She placed thirty-second in the short program after falling on her triple Lutz jump in her planned opening triple Lutz-triple toe loop combination. She managed to tack a double toe loop onto a triple loop jump later in the program, but her reduced technical content was not enough to advance her to the free skate.

Following the season, Kurakova decided to permanently relocate to Egna rather than relocate back to Toronto due to high costs and not wanting to be far away from friends and family, who reside in Poland and Russia, during the COVID-19 pandemic. In addition to Magri, she added Angelina Turenko to her coaching team.

=== 2021–2022 season: Beijing Olympics ===
Kurakova began the season at the 2021 CS Lombardia Trophy, where she won the silver medal. She next competed at the 2021 CS Nebelhorn Trophy, seeking to qualify a berth for Poland at the 2022 Winter Olympics. She placed sixth in the short program after a combination error, but a second-place free skate saw her rise to the silver medal position, securing the second of six available Olympic spots.

Following the Challenger series, Kurakova made her Grand Prix debut at the 2021 Skate America, where she placed ninth. Returning to Poland to compete at the 2021 CS Warsaw Cup, she won the bronze medal, notably finishing first in the free skate. At her second Grand Prix, the 2021 Rostelecom Cup, Kurakova finished in ninth place.

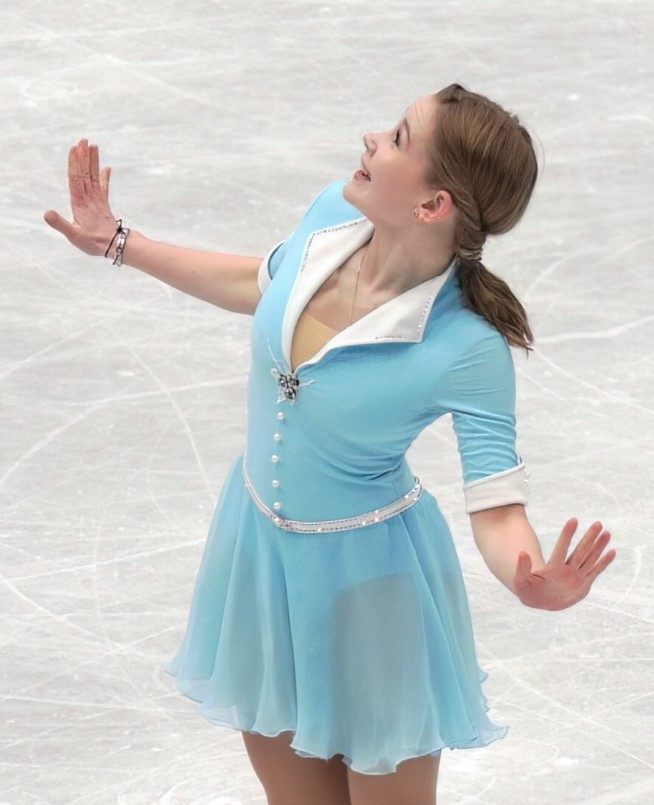
Ekaterina Kurakova finishing her free skate at the 2022 World Championships

Kurakova claimed her fourth consecutive Polish national title in December at the 2022 Four Nationals Championships and was therefore assigned to Poland's berth in the women's event at the 2022 European Championships. At Europeans, Kurakova debuted a new short program to Tchaikovsky's "Valse Sentimentale" and skated cleanly in that segment to set a new personal best. She executed another clean program in the free skate to earn personal bests in that segment, as well as overall and recorded a career-best placement at the event with a fifth-place finish. She cited breaking the 200-point mark as the most exciting result for her. While Kurakova was initially believed to have finished fourth in the free skate and fifth overall, in February 2024 the Court of Arbitration for Sport disqualified erstwhile champion Kamila Valieva for using a banned substance. As a result, Kurakova was moved up to fourth overall and third place in the free skate, and the Polish Figure Skating Association announced that she would receive a bronze small medal for the segment.

Named to the Polish Olympic team, Kurakova placed twenty-fourth in the short program of the women's event, narrowly qualifying for the free skate. Kurakova dramatically improved her position in the free skate, ranking twelfth in that segment and rising to twelfth overall. Posting on Instagram afterward, she exulted: "Life is not always easy. We all have to go through difficult times at times. But if you don't give up, you will be rewarded. This is what I try to convey during my program. Life is Beautiful." Kurakova finished the season with a thirteenth place at the 2022 World Championships.

=== 2022–2023 season ===
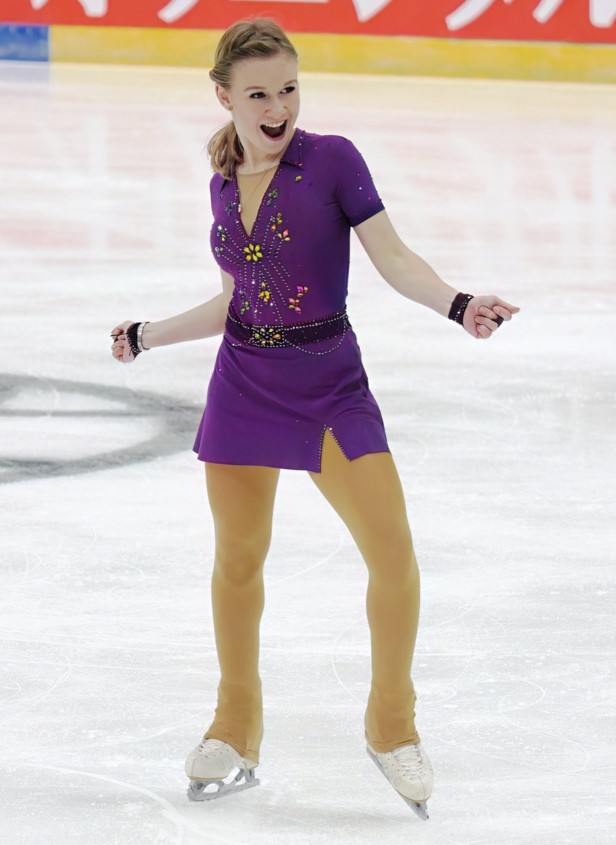
Kurakova performing her short program at the 2022 MK John Wilson Trophy

Kurakova began the season with a bronze medal at 2022 CS Lombardia Trophy. Competing in the Grand Prix, she finished in fifth-place at both 2022 Skate America and 2022 MK John Wilson Trophy. Kurakova then won the 2022 CS Warsaw Cup, her second event title.

At the beginning of December, Kurakova was named to the Polish team for the 2023 Winter World University Games in Lake Placid. She then finished first overall at the 2023 Four National Championships, earning her fifth consecutive Polish national gold medal.

Kurakova finished fifth at the 2023 Winter Universiade. Weeks later she competed at the 2023 European Championships, where she came fifth in the short program. She rose to fourth place in the free skate. Speaking after, Kurakova admitted that she felt the post-Olympic season to be more difficult, contrary to her expectations. She came sixteenth at the 2023 World Championships.

=== 2023–2024 season ===
In July 2023, it was announced by the Polish Figure Skating Association that Kurakova's coach, Angelina Turenko had moved from Egna to Assago to coach at the IceLab Skating Club and that Kurakova had moved there as well to continue training under Turenko. Additionally, it was announced that Kurakova would also receive support from former coach Brian Orser. Over the summer, Kurakova trained at the Toronto Cricket Skating and Curling Club under the guidance of Orser and Tracy Wilson.

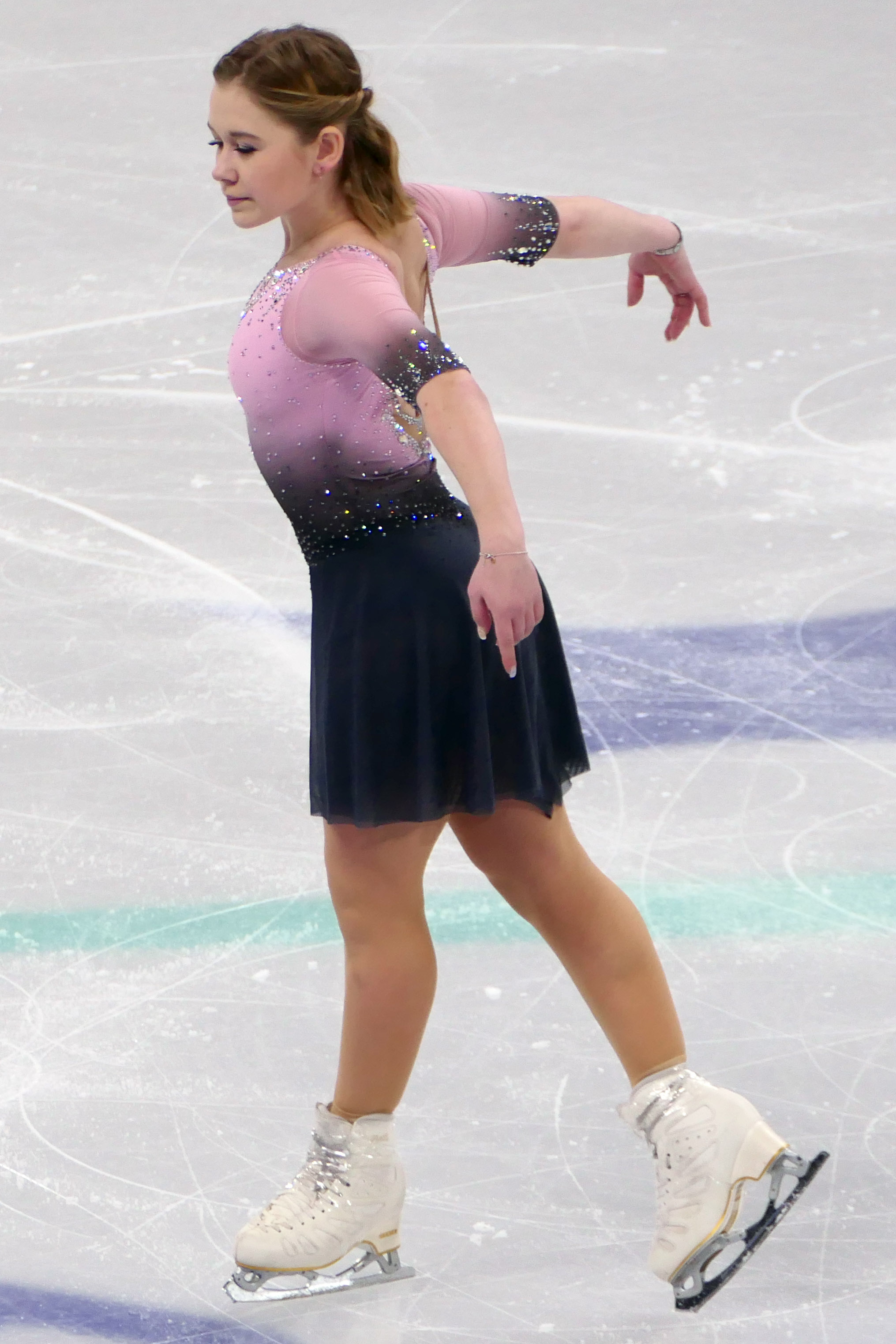
Kurakova during her short program at the 2024 World Championships

Beginning her season on the Challenger circuit, Kurakova finished fourth at both the 2023 CS Lombardia Trophy and the 2023 CS Nepela Memorial. After the latter event, she said she was pleased by her performance and believed she had improved over her first event of the year. She planned to train more in Toronto in advance of her lone Grand Prix appearance. She finished seventh at the 2023 Skate America. Kurakova was subsequently invited to attend a second Grand Prix, replacing Bradie Tennell at the 2023 Cup of China, where she was seventh again. Returning to Poland for the 2023 CS Warsaw Cup the following weekend, she won her third event title.

Kurakova claimed her sixth Polish national title with a first-place finish at the 2024 Four National Championships. At the 2024 European Championships in Kaunas, Kurakova struggled with her jumps in the short program and finished twenty-fifth in the segment, missing the cut for the free skate by one ordinal. She acknowledged that "it didn't work today, unfortunately," while thanking the crowd for their support.

Following the disappointment at the European Championships, Kurakova took two weeks to contemplate whether she wanted to continue, but ultimately said that "I realized that I love skating very much, even if it is difficult sometimes. Difficult experiences sometimes give us more because over time you realize what went wrong." She attended the 2024 World Championships in Montreal, where she placed fourteenth in the short program despite performing only a triple-double jump combination instead of her planned triple-triple. She rose to eleventh after the free skate, a season's best and the highest placement for a Polish skater since Anna Rechnio's sixth in 1999.

A couple months later, Kurakova announced that she had moved to France and that Florent Amodio had become her new coach. Regarding the change, she said, "I’m very grateful to Italy and all the people for all the experience that I received there. It made me grow up a lot! There have been many small and slightly bigger changes during the past two years. I’m grateful to my ex coaches for all what we came through together! But it’s time for one of the biggest changes in my life! It’s new Page of my Life! Of course it’s stressful for now but I’m filled with hope." Kurakova later further opened up about her decision to work with Amodio, sharing, "I have to admit, Florent Amodio came to me at the right moment and he is the man who is behind me. He was with me in my worst period. When I started to work with him, he never gave up on me. I actually met him very early in my career. He asked me if I wanted to work with him already after my very first Worlds, but then I already had a team with Lorenzo... After Europeans, when I missed the free skate at Europeans, he texted me and asked me how I am and told me, ‘remember, this is just skating, not your whole life.’ And I was like, ‘no, it is my life.’ And he said, ‘it’s your life, but still, it’s just skating, and you are wonderful no matter what.’ And people like me, we see it and we remember this. So he just supports me, and I actually need a person who’s gonna adjust for me no matter what. And he’s the person with the biggest heart, a very crazy, amazing man."

=== 2024–2025 season ===
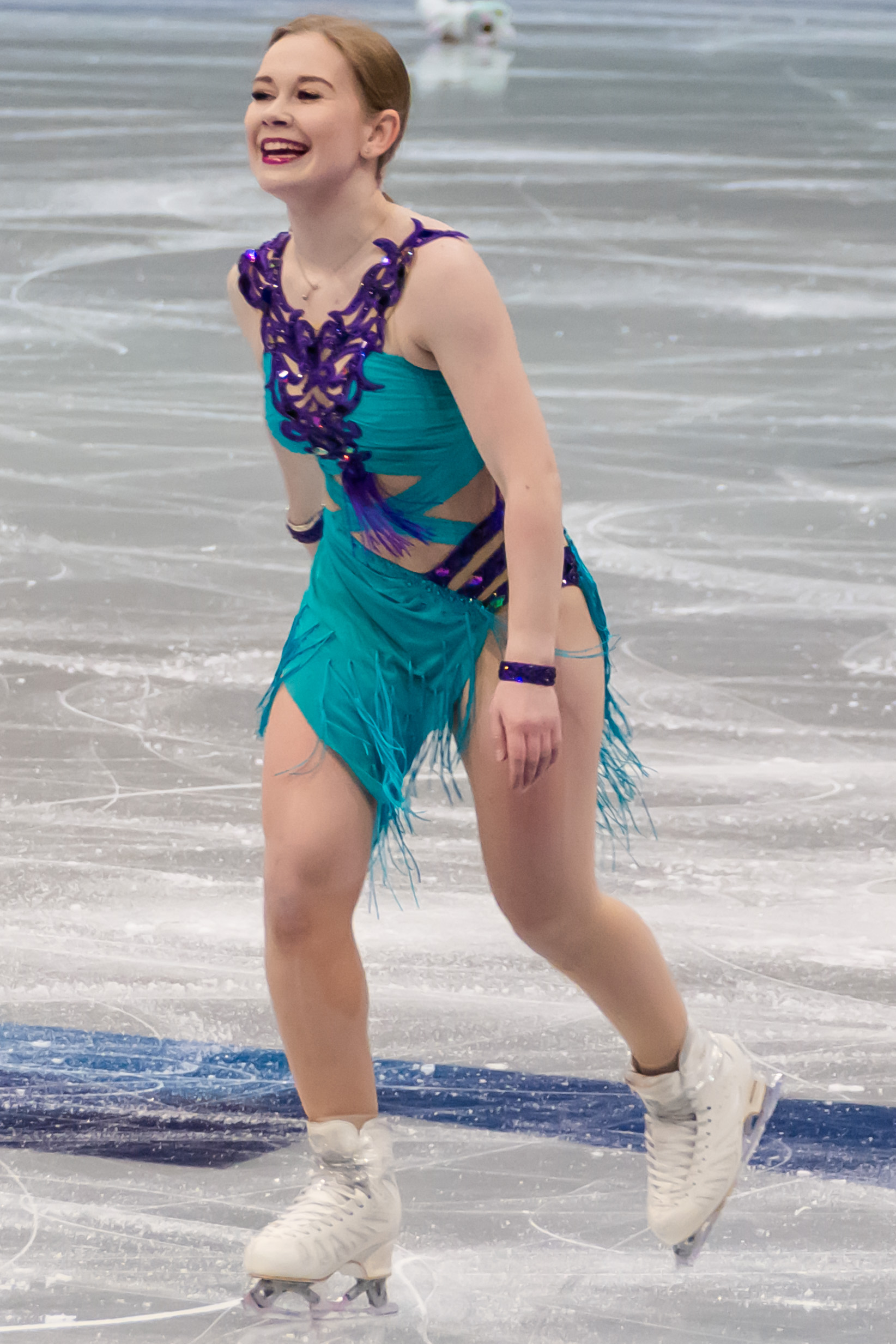
Kurakova following her short program at the 2025 World Championships

Kurakova started the season by finishing fourth at the 2024 Shanghai Trophy. Going on to compete on the 2024–25 Grand Prix circuit, Kurakova placed twelfth in the short program at 2024 Skate Canada International after falling on both her attempted triple jumps and failing to perform a jump combination. However, she would come back with a solid free skate, placing eighth in that segment of the competition and moving up to ninth place overall. Kurakova subsequently finished eleventh at the 2024 NHK Trophy.

In late November, Kurakova competed at the Warsaw Cup and won the silver medal. She said that she was happy with her placement and that "Silver tastes like gold, because unfortunately the beginning of the season has been difficult for me, I haven't shown good results." She added that she was in the process of reworking her skating and jumping technique with Amodio, which was likely the reason for her difficulties with jumps. She subsequently won the bronze medal at the 2025 Four National Championships and placed fourth at the 2025 Sofia Trophy.

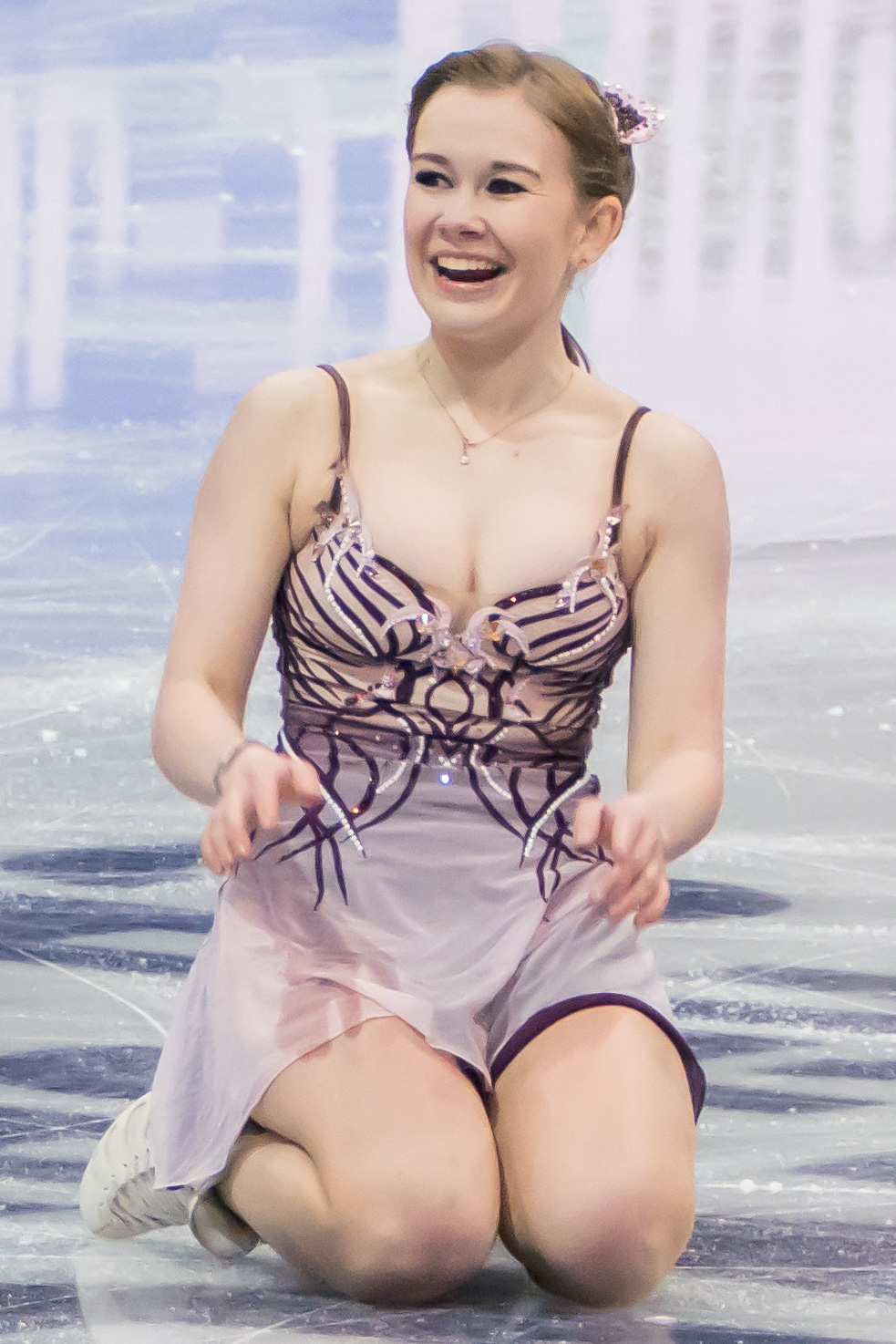
Kurakova following her free skate at the 2025 World Championships

At the 2025 European Championships in late January, Kurakova finished in eight place overall. In an interview afterward, she said, "Honestly, ahead of the short program, I cried so much. I had flashbacks from last year, and I was so afraid that something like that would happen again. But I fought through, I went for the Lutz, and I landed it. That was a personal victory for me."

In February, Kurakova filed a complaint against a French photographer who shared a photograph that had been edited to sexualize her without her consent at the end of December. Kurakova said that the incident caused her fear and stress and that she wanted to protect other skaters from similar behavior. The French Federation of Ice Sports supported her in the suit and banned the photographer.

In March, Kurakova competed at the 2025 Maria Olszewska Memorial, where she finished in fourth place. Later that month, she competed at the 2025 World Championships. She placed twenty-first in the short program and advanced to the free skate, where she placed eighteenth and finished in twentieth place overall. Her placement earned Poland a quota at the upcoming 2026 Winter Olympics.

=== 2025–2026 season: Milano Cortina Olympics ===
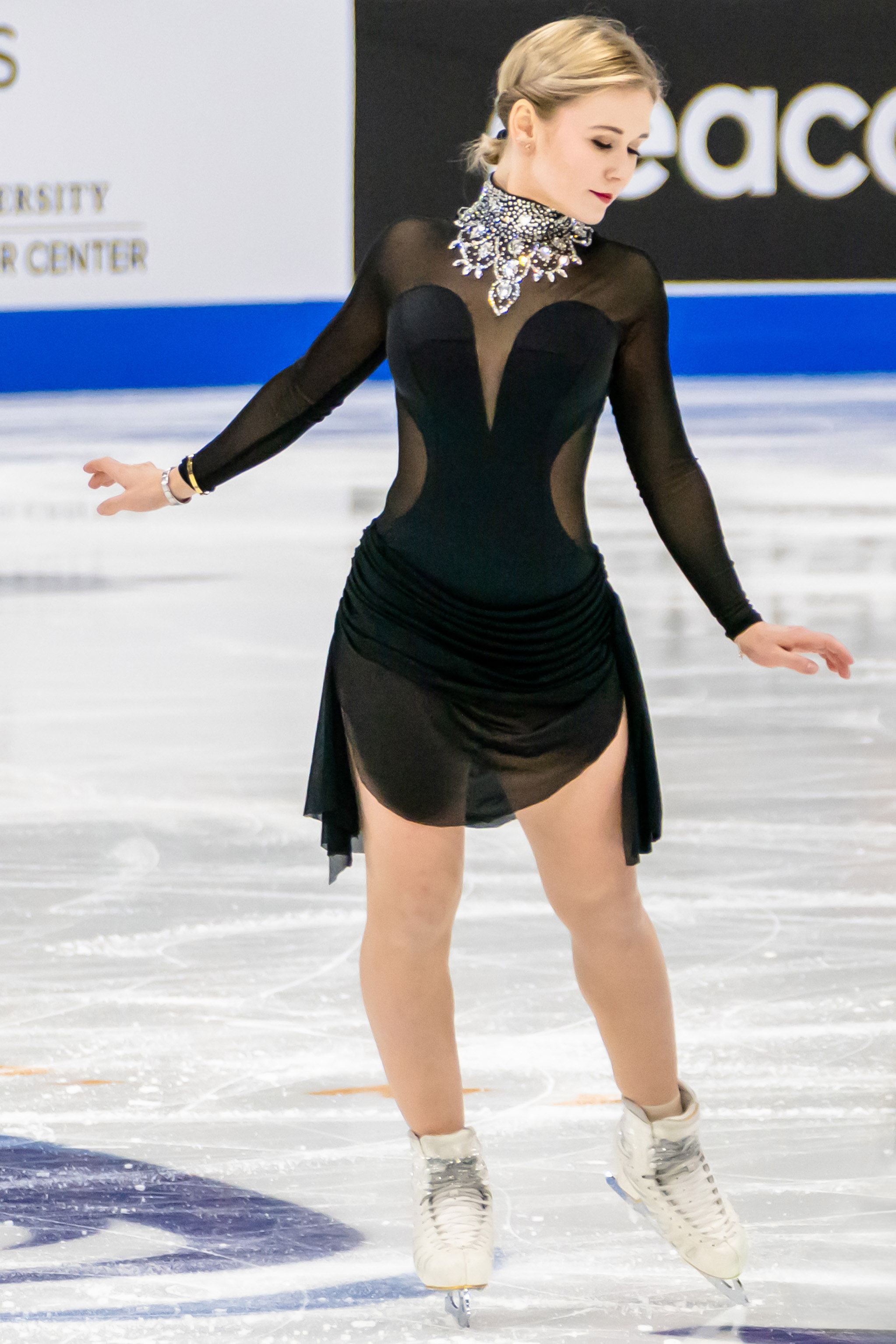
Kurakova during her free skate at 2025 Skate America

Kurakova began her season in September with a twelfth-place finish at the 2025 CS Lombardia Trophy, and in October, she won the gold medal at the 2025 Budapest Trophy.

Kurakova had one assignment on the 2025–26 Grand Prix circuit, 2025 Skate America. She was eleventh in the short program and rose to tenth place overall after the free skate. She was originally entered to compete in the 2025 Warsaw Cup the next week; however, on her return flight, the luggage that contained her skates was lost, forcing her to withdraw. In December, she competed at the Four Nationals Championships, where she won both the Polish women's competition as well as the overall women's competition. The following month, Kurakova competed at the 2026 European Championships in Sheffield, England, United Kingdom. She placed eighth in the short program and tenth in the free skate, finishing in ninth overall. "Today was amazing," she said following her free skate. "I would say the last time when I had a competition like that was like in 2023, so I think it was a very tough two and a half years and now I’m coming back. I am so grateful. I’m so grateful for the people always believing in me no matter how I skate. The people who kept saying to me, ‘my God, you are amazing’, those people got less than before, but they were still there. And I want to thank so much everyone who kept believing in me."

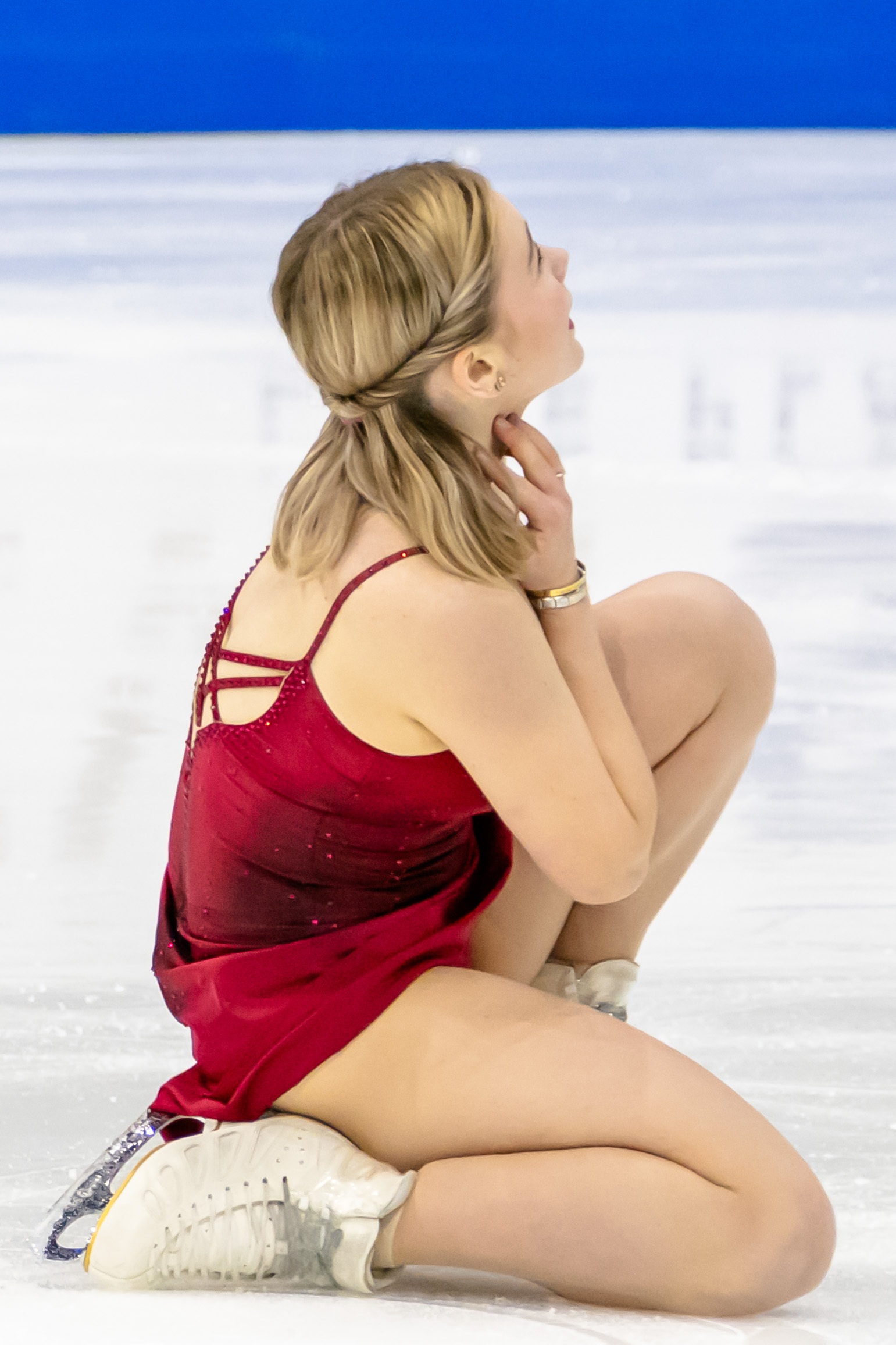
Kurakova during her short program at 2025 Skate America

On 6 February, Kurakova placed ninth in the short program with a new season's best score in the 2026 Winter Olympics Figure Skating Team Event. "Finally, I had a successful skate because the last three years," she said. "I'm not going to lie, I was hyped before this to become better this year. But at every competition, something was not here, and I was like, come on, today needs to happen. So I was like, I'm going to go full power."

On 17 February, Kurakova competed in the short program segment of the 2026 Winter Olympics – Women's singles event, placing nineteenth and scoring another season's best. "I'm happy about my season's best," she said after her performance. "I'm also happy that we analyzed the team event well. In the team event, all my spins were level 3, and I didn't know why... Today, everything was at maximum, it was level 4, so I'm very happy. We did an easier combination, that's why I'm not fully satisfied. But I understand it was probably smart. It was the right decision to go for a clean skate today, but at the same time, I felt the pressure because I knew there was no room for mistakes. Either it's perfect skating, and I'm in the free program, or I can say 'Ciao' to everyone, and that's it."

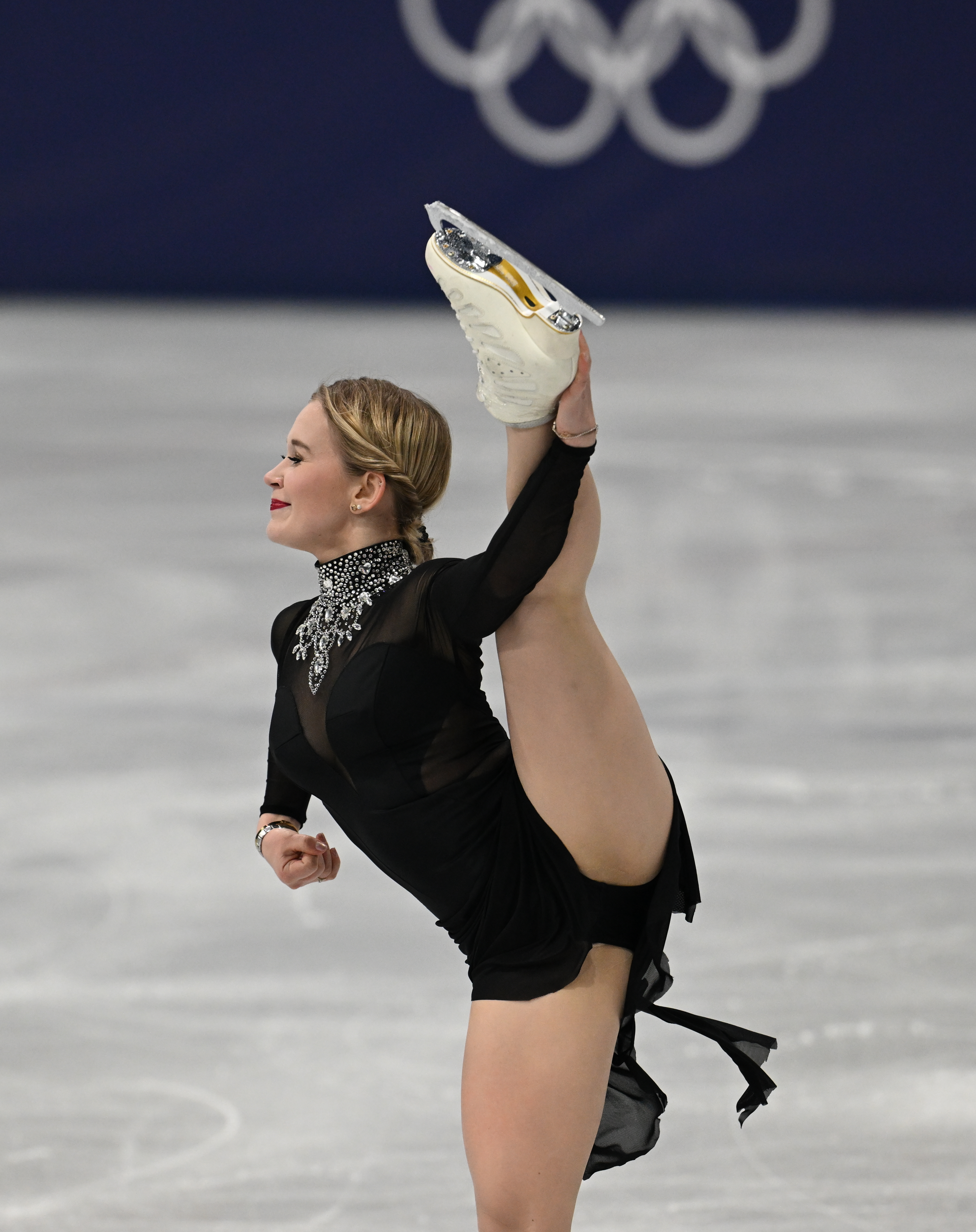
Kurakova performing her free program at the 2026 Winter Olympics

Two days later, three hours before the free skate, after landing a jump in training, Kurakova injured her left calf. Not wanting to know what injury she had sustained, Kurakova opted to only take pain medication before competing. She placed twenty-first in the free skate to finish in twentieth place overall. "I'm very happy," she said following her free skate. "I injured my leg today in the first practice. So I didn't even wait until my music, I left because I couldn't stay anymore. I was very stressed about my right leg. I thought, 'How will I go for the Lutz? How will I go for my flip?' I managed it very well. I had one mistake, but the rest was clean. So honestly, I'm very proud of these Olympic Games. It's really good. It's the second-best score I had during the last three seasons. So I think it's a good result." A month following the Olympics, Kurakova competed at the 2026 World Championships – placing nineteenth in both competition segments and overall. She shared with the media about her injury and burn out from the Olympics, "I am so tired. It’s the end of the season and the last competition. The time after the Olympics was actually very hard. I had a stress fracture in my ankle, which is why I also felt so much pain during the free skate at the Olympics. I was off the ice for two weeks, and just one week ago I started jumping again. So most of my preparation was really only last week. I honestly thought I was going to have to withdraw because I couldn’t do it, but my coach told me, ‘Yes, you can do it. Do it for little Katia, so I did it for her, I did it for my coach (Florent Amodio) and I am so thankful to him. So, I’m here."

== Programs ==
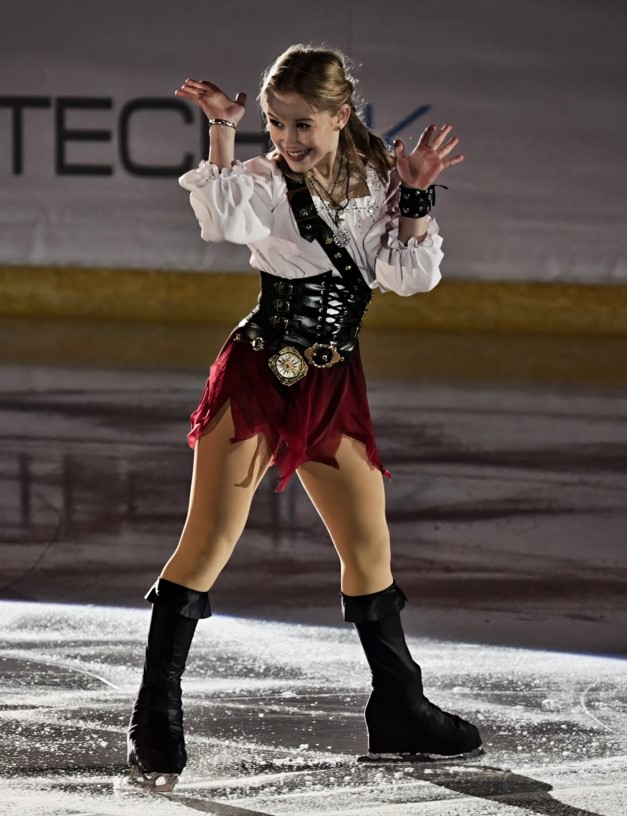
Kurakova performing her exhibition program at the 2022 MK John Wilson Trophy

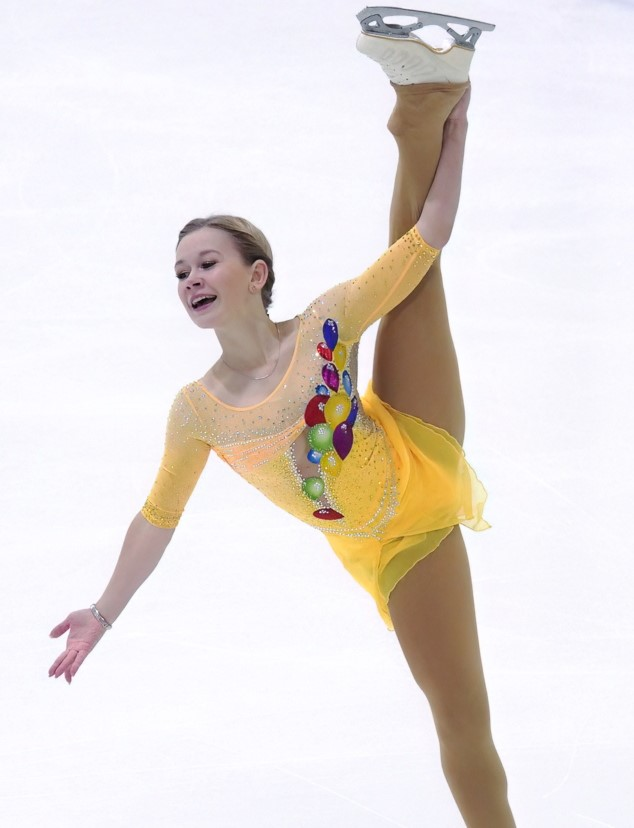
Kurakova performing a Y-spiral at the 2022 CS Lombardia Trophy

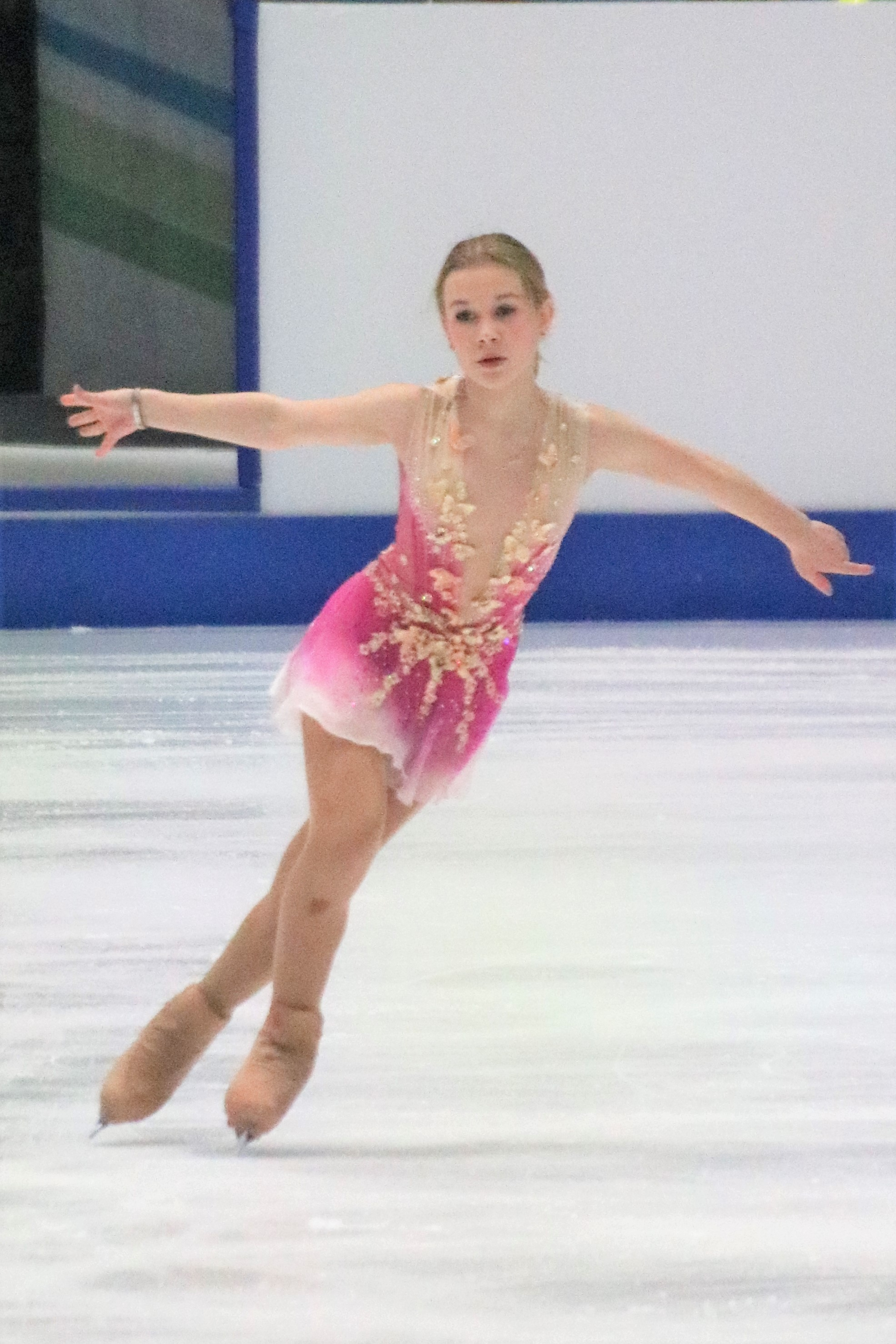
Kurakova performing her free program at the 2020 European Championships

Competition and exhibition programs by season
Season	Short program	Free skate program	Exhibition program
2015–16	Knock on Wood: Performed by Safri Duo	Mulan: Composed by Jerry Goldsmith	—N/a
2016–17	"You Raise Me Up": Performed by Celtic Woman	Vicente Amigo Medley: Performed by Vicente Amigo; Tracks used: 1. Poeta en el mar 2. Amor dulce muerte 3. Poeta en el viento	—N/a
2018–19	"You Raise Me Up"	Vicente Amigo Medley	"You Raise Me Up"
2019–20	"La Vie en rose": By Édith Piaf; Choreo. by David Wilson	Le Corsaire: 1. Pas de deux 2. Medora's variation; Composed by Adolphe Adam & Riccardo Drigo; Choreo. by David Wilson	—N/a
2020–21	"La Vie en rose"	Charlie Chaplin Medley: 1. "The Terry Theme"; 2. "Awakening"; From Limelight Soundtrack; 3. "Je cherche apres Titine"; Composed by Léo Daniderff; 4. Modern Times Theme; From Modern Times Soundtrack; 5. La Violetera; From City Lights Soundtrack; Composed by José Padilla; Choreo. by Benoît Richaud	"La Vie en rose"
2020–21	Janet Jackson Medley: Performed by Janet Jackson; Choreo. by Benoît Richaud; Tracks used: 1. "Together Again"; 2. "Strawberry Bounce"; 3. "Nasty"; 4. "Rhythm Nation"	Charlie Chaplin Medley	"La Vie en rose"
2021–22	"Steppe": Composed by René Aubry; Choreo. by Benoît Richaud	Charlie Chaplin Medley	Wonder Woman Theme: Performed by Tina Guo; Choreo. by David Wilson
2021–22	Sentimental Waltz, Op. 51, No. 6: Composed by Pyotr Ilyich Tchaikovsky; Choreo. by Benoît Richaud	Charlie Chaplin Medley	Wonder Woman Theme
2022–23	Elvis Presley Medley: Performed by Elvis Presley; Choreo. by Ivan Righini; Tracks used: 1. "Can't Help Falling in Love"; 2. "A Little Less Conversation"	Up Soundtrack: Composed by Michael Giacchino; Choreo. by Massimo Scali; Tracks used: 1. "We Are In the Club Now"; 2. "Married Life"; 3. "Up With Titles"; 4. "Memories Can Weigh You Down"	Pirates of the Caribbean: 1. Bayside Waltz; Composed by The Wimshurst's Machine; 2. "Jack Sparrow"; 3. "Drink Up Me Hearties Yo Ho"; Composed by Hans Zimmer; Choreo. by Ivan Righini
2023–24	Kill Bill (Produced by RZA): 1. "Bang Bang (My Baby Shot Me Down)"; Performed by Nancy Sinatra; 2. "Battle Without Honor or Humanity" (バトル･ウィズアウト･オナー・オア・ヒューマニティー); Composed by Tomoyasu Hotei; Choreo. by Ivan Righini	Medley: 1. "Solas"; Performed by Jamie Duffy; 2. "My Way"; Performed by Luca D'Alberto; 3. "White Flowers Take Their Bath"; Performed by Mari Samuelsen & Jonathan Stockhammer; Composed by Meredi; Choreo. by Benoît Richaud	Medley: 1. Swan Lake, Act 2, No. 14; Composed by Pyotr Ilyich Tchaikovsky; Performed by All - Union Radio Symphony Orchestra & Gennady Rozhdestvensky; 2. "Lalisa"; Performed by Lisa; 3. "Billie Jean"; Performed by Michael Jackson; Choreo. by Ivan Righini
2023–24	Sentimental Waltz, Op. 51, No. 6	Medley: 1. "Solas"; 2. "My Way"; 3. "White Flowers Take Their Bath"	Medley: 1. Swan Lake; 2. "Lalisa"; 3. "Billie Jean"
2024–25	Let's Get Loud: From Cinderella (originally by Jennifer Lopez); Performed by Camila Cabello, Nicholas Galitzine, & Idina Menzel; Choreo. by Florent Amodio	Cats: 1. "Macavity: The Mystery Cat"; Performed by Taylor Swift; 2. "The Naming of Cats"; Performed by Stephen Tate & Jeff Shankley; 3. "Memory"; Performed by André Rieu & Mirusia Louwerse; Composed by Andrew Lloyd Webber; Choreo. by Florent Amodio	Pirates of the Caribbean
2025–26	"N'insiste pas": By Camille Lellouche; Choreo. by Florent Amodio	Moulin Rouge!: 1. Sparkling Diamonds; Performed by Nicole Kidman; 2. Elephant Love Medley; Performed by Nicole Kidman, Ewan McGregor; 3. One Day I'll Fly Away; Performed by Nicole Kidman; 4. The Show Must Go On; Performed by Jim Broadbent, Nicole Kidman; Choreo. by Florent Amodio	—N/a
2026–27	This Bitter Earth (On the Nature of Daylight): By Max Richter; Choreo. by Florent Amodio	Medley: 1. Beautiful Liar in Ancient Egypt (Epic Middle Eastern Cinematic Cover); 2. "Cleopatra - The Final Days of Egypt’s Last Queen"; 3. "La La La /Waka Waka (This Time for Africa) Medley (El Dorado World Tour Live)"	—N/a

== Competitive highlights ==
- GP – Event of the ISU Grand Prix Series
- JGP – Event of the ISU Junior Grand Prix Series
- CS – Event of the ISU Challenger Series
- TBD – Assigned
- WD – Withdrew from competition
- C – Event was cancelled
- Medals at team events are awarded for the team results only. Individual placements at team events are listed in parentheses.

=== Women's singles (for Poland) ===
Competition placements at senior level
Season	2018–19	2019–20	2020–21	2021–22	2022–23	2023–24	2024–25	2025–26	2026–27
Winter Olympics				11th				20th	
Winter Olympics (Team event)								10th	
World Championships		C	32nd	13th	16th	11th	20th	19th	
European Championships		10th	C	4th	4th	25th	8th	9th	
Polish Championships	1st	1st	1st	1st	1st	1st	1st	1st	
Four Nationals Championships	1st	1st	1st	1st	1st	1st	3rd	1st	
GP Cup of China						7th			
GP NHK Trophy							11th		
GP Rostelecom Cup				9th					
GP Skate America				9th	5th	7th		10th	
GP Skate Canada							9th		
GP Wilson Trophy					5th				
CS Lombardia Trophy				2nd	3rd	4th		12th	
CS Nebelhorn Trophy				2nd					
CS Nepela Memorial						4th			
CS Warsaw Cup		1st		3rd	1st	1st	2nd		TBD
Budapest Trophy								1st	
Challenge Cup						4th			
Iceskatera									1st
Japan Open					3rd (4th)				
Maria Olszewska Memorial							4th		
Mentor Toruń Cup		1st							
Shanghai Trophy							4th		
Sofia Trophy							4th		
Swiss Open								4th	
Tayside Trophy									2nd
Crystal Skate									1st
Winter University Games					5th				

Competition placements at junior level
Season	2018–19	2019–20	2020–21
World Junior Championships		7th	
Polish Championships	1st	1st	1st
JGP Latvia		5th	
JGP Poland		7th	

=== Women's singles (for Russia) ===
Competition placements at junior level
Season	2015–16	2016–17
Russian Championships	15th	9th
Mentor Toruń Cup	1st	1st

== Detailed results ==
ISU personal best scores in the +5/-5 GOE System
Segment	Type	Score	Event
Total	TSS	204.73	2022 European Championships
Short program	TSS	67.47	2022 European Championships
Short program	TES	37.04	2019 CS Warsaw Cup
Short program	PCS	31.69	2022 European Championships
Free skating	TSS	137.26	2022 European Championships
Free skating	TES	72.91	2019 CS Warsaw Cup
Free skating	PCS	66.52	2022 European Championships

=== Senior results ===
Results in the 2018–19 season
Date	Event	SP		FS		Total	
Date	Event	P	Score	P	Score	P	Score
Dec 14–15, 2018	(Hungary) 2019 Four Nationals Championships	1	57.76	1	121.04	1	178.80
Dec 14–15, 2018	(Hungary) 2019 Polish Championships (Note: The Polish Championships are contested as part of the Four Nationals Championships.)	1	—N/a	1	—N/a	1	—N/a

Results in the 2019–20 season
Date	Event	SP		FS		Total	
Date	Event	P	Score	P	Score	P	Score
Nov 14–17, 2019	(Poland) 2019 CS Warsaw Cup	2	66.08	1	135.39	1	201.47
Dec 13–14, 2019	(Czech Republic) 2020 Four Nationals Championships	1	57.30	1	120.66	1	177.96
Dec 13–14, 2019	(Czech Republic) 2020 Polish Championships	1	—N/a	1	—N/a	1	—N/a
Jan 20–26, 2020	(Austria) 2020 European Championships	13	58.49	9	111.75	10	170.24

Results in the 2020–21 season
Date	Event	SP		FS		Total	
Date	Event	P	Score	P	Score	P	Score
Dec 10–12, 2020	(Poland) 2021 Four Nationals Championships	1	57.64	1	120.90	1	178.54
Dec 10–12, 2020	(Poland) 2021 Polish Championships	1	—N/a	1	—N/a	1	—N/a
Mar 22–28, 2021	(Sweden) 2021 World Championships	32	52.28	-	-	32	52.28

Results in the 2021–22 season
Date	Event	SP		FS		Total	
Date	Event	P	Score	P	Score	P	Score
Sep 10–12, 2021	(Italy) 2021 CS Lombardia Trophy	3	61.51	2	126.14	2	187.65
Sep 22–25, 2021	(Germany) 2021 CS Nebelhorn Trophy	6	61.04	2	132.54	2	193.58
Oct 22–24, 2021	(United States) 2021 Skate America	11	61.36	9	127.24	9	188.60
Nov 17–20, 2021	(Poland) 2021 CS Warsaw Cup	6	61.20	1	126.60	3	187.80
Nov 26–28, 2021	(Russia) 2021 Rostelecom Cup	11	56.43	9	119.21	9	175.64
Dec 17–18, 2021	(Slovakia) 2022 Four Nationals Championships	2	59.32	1	130.74	1	190.06
Dec 17–18, 2021	(Slovakia) 2022 Polish Championships	1	—N/a	1	—N/a	1	—N/a
Jan 10–16, 2022	(Estonia) 2022 European Championships	4	67.47	3	137.26	4	204.73
Feb 15–17, 2022	(China) 2022 Winter Olympics	23	59.08	11	126.78	11	185.84
Mar 21–27, 2022	(France) 2022 World Championships	16	61.92	9	124.51	13	186.43

Results in the 2022–23 season
Date	Event	SP		FS		Total	
Date	Event	P	Score	P	Score	P	Score
Sep 16–18, 2022	(Italy) 2022 CS Lombardia Trophy	4	59.24	3	129.17	3	188.41
Oct 21–23, 2022	(United States) 2022 Skate America	6	63.65	4	115.03	5	178.68
Nov 11–13, 2022	(United Kingdom) 2022 MK John Wilson Trophy	4	63.56	4	126.98	5	190.44
Nov 17–20, 2022	(Poland) 2022 CS Warsaw Cup	1	64.66	1	125.32	1	189.98
Dec 15–17, 2022	(Hungary) 2023 Four Nationals Championships	1	63.01	1	122.13	1	185.14
Dec 15–17, 2022	(Hungary) 2023 Polish Championships	1	—N/a	1	—N/a	1	—N/a
Jan 13–15, 2023	(United States) 2023 Winter Universiade	5	63.22	4	123.51	5	186.73
Jan 25–29, 2023	(Finland) 2023 European Championships	5	61.81	4	125.09	4	186.90
Mar 22–26, 2023	(Japan) 2023 World Championships	9	65.69	17	115.74	16	184.92

Results in the 2023–24 season
Date	Event	SP		FS		Total	
Date	Event	P	Score	P	Score	P	Score
Sep 8–10, 2023	(Italy) 2023 CS Lombardia Trophy	4	62.00	3	116.62	4	178.62
Sep 28–30, 2023	(Slovakia) 2023 CS Nepela Memorial	5	57.87	3	124.11	4	181.98
Oct 20–22, 2023	(United States) 2023 Skate America	7	60.45	7	113.30	7	173.75
Nov 10–12, 2023	2023 Cup of China	9	57.37	7	115.78	7	173.15
Nov 16–19, 2023	(Poland) 2023 CS Warsaw Cup	6	57.45	1	124.26	1	181.71
Dec 14–16, 2023	(Czech Republic) 2024 Four Nationals Championships	1	62.04	1	109.06	1	171.10
Dec 14–16, 2023	(Czech Republic) 2024 Polish Championships	1	—N/a	1	—N/a	1	—N/a
Jan 10–14, 2024	(Lithuania) 2024 European Championships	25	49.47	-	-	25	49.47
Feb 22–25, 2024	(Netherlands) 2024 Challenge Cup	4	56.19	4	111.44	4	167.43
Mar 18–24, 2024	(Canada) 2024 World Championships	14	62.34	10	122.42	11	184.76

Results in the 2024–25 season
Date	Event	SP		FS		Total	
Date	Event	P	Score	P	Score	P	Score
Oct 3–5, 2024	(China) 2024 Shanghai Trophy	4	58.41	3	115.88	4	174.29
Oct 25–27, 2024	2024 Skate Canada International	12	47.31	8	114.76	9	162.07
Nov 8–10, 2024	(Japan) 2024 NHK Trophy	9	56.46	12	100.68	11	157.14
Nov 20–24, 2024	(Poland) 2024 CS Warsaw Cup	4	57.87	3	113.21	2	171.08
Dec 13–14, 2024	(Poland) 2025 Four Nationals Championships	6	50.03	2	109.72	3	159.75
Dec 13–14, 2024	(Poland) 2025 Polish Championships	1	—N/a	1	—N/a	1	—N/a
Jan 7–12, 2025	(Bulgaria) 2025 Sofia Trophy	3	61.59	5	111.85	4	173.44
Jan 28 – Feb 2, 2025	(Estonia) 2025 European Championships	9	58.70	11	110.31	8	169.01
Mar 4–9, 2025	(Poland) Maria Olszewska Memorial	3	57.50	4	106.06	4	163.56
Mar 25–30, 2025	(United States) 2025 World Championships	21	55.52	18	106.97	20	162.49

Results in the 2025–26 season
Date	Event	SP		FS		Total	
Date	Event	P	Score	P	Score	P	Score
Sep 11–14, 2025	(Italy) 2025 CS Lombardia Trophy	12	53.23	13	98.75	12	151.98
Oct 10–12, 2025	(Hungary) 2025 Budapest Trophy	1	53.44	1	111.36	1	164.80
Oct 23–26, 2025	(Switzerland) Swiss Open	5	56.06	2	113.59	4	169.65
Nov 14–16, 2025	(United States) 2025 Skate America	11	56.05	10	107.72	10	163.77
Dec 11–13, 2025	(Slovakia) 2026 Four Nationals Championships	1	57.15	1	109.48	1	166.63
Dec 11–13, 2025	(Slovakia) 2026 Polish Championships	1	—N/a	1	—N/a	1	—N/a
Jan 13–18, 2026	(United Kingdom) 2026 European Championships	8	58.08	10	117.07	9	175.15
Feb 6–8, 2026	(Italy) 2026 Winter Olympics – Team event	9	57.76	—N/a	—N/a	10	—N/a
Feb 17–19, 2026	(Italy) 2026 Winter Olympics	19	60.14	21	113.23	20	173.37
Mar 24–29, 2026	(Czech Republic) 2026 World Championships	19	58.10	19	106.44	19	164.54

Results in the 2026–27 season
Date	Event	SP		FS		Total	
Date	Event	P	Score	P	Score	P	Score
Oct 10–11, 2026	(United Kingdom) 2026 Tayside Trophy	1	66.33	3	117.43	2	183.76
Oct 27 – Nov 1, 2026	(Romania) 2026 Crystal Skate	1	60.60	2	105.42	1	166.02
Nov 6–7, 2026	(Poland) 2026 Iceskatera	1	67.37	1	117.57	1	184.94

=== Junior results ===
Results in the 2019–20 season
Date	Event	SP		FS		Total	
Date	Event	P	Score	P	Score	P	Score
Sep 4–9, 2019	2019 JGP Latvia	6	58.65	5	117.32	5	175.97
Sep 18–21, 2019	2019 JGP Poland	7	60.54	6	112.05	7	172.59
Mar 2–8, 2018	(Estonia) 2020 World Junior Championships	9	63.20	7	121.31	7	184.51
