= Sarah Cothran =

- Born: Sarah Jessica Cothran; June 11, 2002 (age 24); Seminary, Mississippi, U.S.
- Occupation: Singer-songwriter
- Years active: 2017–present

YouTube information
- Channel: Sarah Cothran
- Subscribers: 800 thousand
- Views: 208 million
- Musical career
- Genre: Pop
- Instruments: Vocals; guitar; piano
- Labels: Republic (2021–2024); Independent (2024–present)
- Website: www.sarahcothran.com

Sarah Jessica Cothran (born June 11, 2002) is an American singer-songwriter. Raised in Mississippi and based in Nashville, Cothran gained popularity on social media platform TikTok with a series of song covers in a minor key. She gained recognition for her cover of Matt Maltese's song "As the World Caves In" in 2021, earning 400 million streams and a gold certification from the Recording Industry Association of America. She subsequently signed with Republic Records and released two singles in 2022 before her first extended play, I Hope You're Happy, in September. She toured as a supporting act for Alec Benjamin in 2022, and released several singles in 2023 and 2024 before splitting from Republic and going independent.

== Career ==
Sarah Jessica Cothran was born on June 11, 2002, in Seminary, Mississippi. She began writing and playing music in junior high school at the age of thirteen. Cothran began posting music on YouTube in 2017, and launched a TikTok account after graduating high school in 2020, having moved to Nashville, Tennessee. She gained popularity on TikTok with her series of videos singing covers of songs in a minor key; her cover of Taylor Swift's "Love Story" was included in several books' playlists. Cothran considered social media an effective opportunity to share music and connect with her supporters; her website has a minimalistic design, focusing on her music and TikTok videos. In January 2018, Cothran released a cover of Avenged Sevenfold's "So Far Away" featuring her older sister Michaila, which received more than one million views.

Cothran gained recognition for her cover of Matt Maltese's song "As the World Caves In", originally released with three short videos on TikTok before receiving a full release on streaming platforms on May 12, 2021. It ranked tenth among the most viral songs worldwide on July 14, according to Spotify. The single earned 400 million global streams, and was certified gold by the Recording Industry Association of America on September 16, 2022. It was featured in the first episode of The Summer I Turned Pretty in June 2022, and an episode of The Morning Show in October 2023. Maltese's original song saw a resurgence after Cothran's cover. Cothran considered it important to co-produce her own music to maintain her creativity and to "level out the huge gap" regarding the lack of female producers.

Following the song's success, Cothran signed with Republic Records in August 2021, represented by Sara Bollwinkel of Wasserman Music, and legally by Doug Mark. Cothran's first single with Republic, "Baby Why", was released on July 29, 2022. The song is about constant fighting in a toxic relationship. Cothran was inspired by vintage sounds but wanted to add a "modern twist". The single gained over one million global streams in ten days. The music video was released on August 11, with visuals inspired by the 1950s. Her next single, "Funeral", was released on August 26; co-written with Maltese over several days in a studio in Nashville, the song is about attending one's own funeral. The music video was released on December 2.

Cothran's debut extended play, I Hope You're Happy (stylized in all lowercase), was released on September 30. She wrote and produced most of the songs late at night in her bedroom. Consequence's Mary Siroky named one of the songs, "I'm Here", a runner-up for Song of the Week, writing that it "unspools like a diary entry ... the knowledge that life could have been different can be haunting, and Cothran tries to close the chapter on her own terms with this poignant brush of her pen". The music video for "I'm Here" was released on December 17, filmed by the Nashville Drone Company at Harpeth Valley Farm in Kingston Springs, Tennessee. Cothran was one of Alec Benjamin's supporting acts on his tour in September 2022. She released a single, "Stronger Than Me", on September 8, 2023, followed by "Me Myself & I" on October 6. Cothran performed live at the Fox Oakland Theatre on October 10.

From 2023, Cothran partnered with Bristol Myers Squibb for an awareness campaign about hypertrophic cardiomyopathy, with which her mother was diagnosed in 2018; the partnership was nominated for Direct-to-Consumer Campaign at PM360's Trailblazer Awards in 2024. Cothran released a cover of "Hazy Shade of Winter" on January 26, 2024. She posted a cover of a Cat Janice's "Dance You Outta My Head" in February; Janice shared it on Instagram, her final post before her death on February 28. Cothran was featured on a new version of "Solas" by Jamie Duffy on March 15. She released a single, "Gutter", on April 26, followed by "Lead Me On" on June 28, when she revealed she had recently split from Republic to become an independent artist, wanting to make music without external pressures. Her next song, "Rich Romance", was released alongside a music video on May 28, 2025, (Note: Cothran, Sarah [@sarahcothran_]; (May 27, 2025). "'Rich Romance' & music video out TONIGHT at midnight" – via Instagram.) followed by "Love of Your Life" on September 19, (Note: Cothran, Sarah [@sarahcothran_]; (September 19, 2025). "Thank you to everyone who made this song so fun and wonderful!!" – via Instagram.) "Cash Out" on October 24, (Note: Cothran, Sarah [@sarahcothran_]; (October 19, 2025). "new song "cash out" out Friday" – via Instagram.) and a cover of "Christmas of Love" on November 7. (Note: Cothran, Sarah [@sarahcothran_]; (November 7, 2025). "Surprise! "Christmas of Love" out everywhere!!" – via Instagram.)

== Discography ==
=== Extended plays ===
List of extended plays
Title	Details
I Hope You're Happy	Released: September 30, 2022; Label: Republic; Format: Digital download, streaming

=== Singles ===
As lead artist
Title	Year	Certifications	Album
"Talking to Myself"	2020		—N/a
"Love Story"	2021		—N/a
"Poor Marionette"	2021		—N/a
"As the World Caves In"	2021	RIAA: Gold	—N/a
"Don't Want My Heart"	2021		—N/a
"As the World Caves In" (Wuki remix)	2021		—N/a
"Baby Why"	2022		I Hope You're Happy
"Funeral"	2022		I Hope You're Happy
"Stronger Than Me"	2023		—N/a
"Me Myself & I"	2023		—N/a
"Hazy Shade of Winter"	2024		—N/a
"Gutter"	2024		—N/a
"Lead Me On"	2024		—N/a
"Rich Romance"	2025		—N/a
"Love of Your Life"	2025		—N/a
"Cash Out"	2025		—N/a
"Christmas of Love"	2025		—N/a

As featured artist
Title	Year	Album
"Solas" (Jamie Duffy featuring Sarah Cothran)	2024	—N/a
