= Chinese Dreams =

Cantonese-language Chinese patriotic song

Chinese Dreams (traditional Chinese: 中國夢; simplified Chinese: 中国梦; Jyutping: Zung1 Gwok3 Mung6) is a Cantonese-language Chinese patriotic song by Hong Kong singer Roman Tam, written by Huang Hao and composed by Zhao Wenhai. The song debuted in the album Love Fantasy, and became popular in Taiwan and Hong Kong, as well as in areas of Southern China. However, due to its pro-democratic associations, the song is not promoted by Mainland Chinese officials, although it is permitted. Chinese Dreams was performed by Lu Wen at the 1985 Spring Festival Gala, as well as at the 1989 Concert for Democracy in China. As well, the song has become a mainstay of the Hong Kong Victory Garden Candlelight Gala. A Mandarin version was recorded in 1984, but it remains lesser known to its Cantonese counterpart.

== See also ==
- The Plum Blossom
- Ode to the Republic of China
