= Jamie Duffy (Irish musician) =

Irish musician

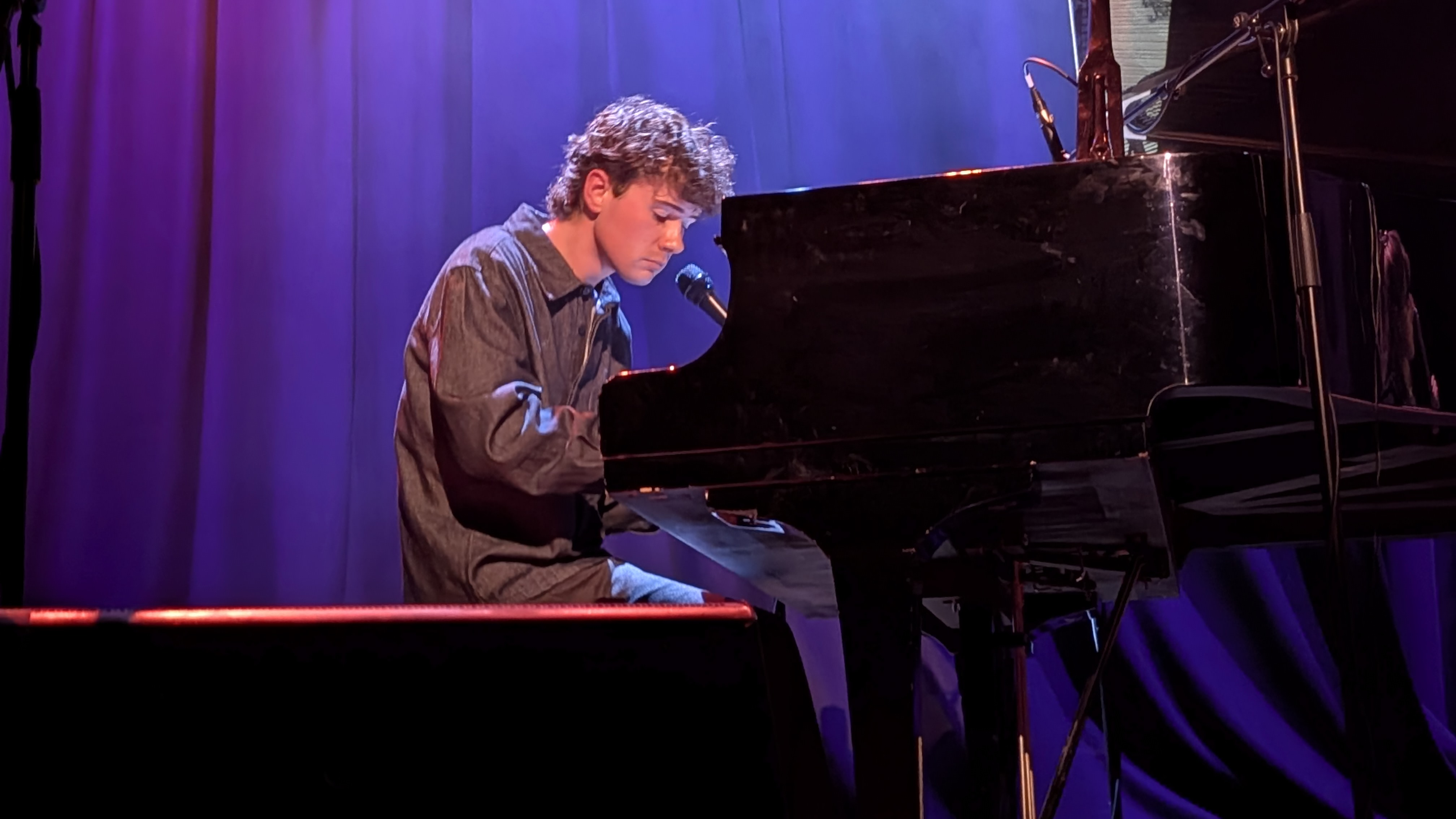
Jamie Duffy playing at the Bristol Beacon

Jamie Duffy (born 2001) is an Irish musician, composer and songwriter from the village of Glaslough in the north-east of County Monaghan.

== Early life ==
Duffy is from the small border village of Glaslough where he attended school locally before moving to Belfast to study International Relations and Politics at Queen's University Belfast. He comes from a musical family, and his grandparents were in show bands from the 1960s onwards and helped to form the local musical society in his hometown.

== Career ==
During his time at university Duffy worked as a pianist at both Castle Leslie Estate in Glaslough, and at the Europa Hotel in Belfast, splitting his time between Belfast and Monaghan. It was at this time that Duffy also released his debut single "Solas", which reached the No. 1 position in the classical charts of several countries and became the most successful debut release from an Irish artist since "Take Me to Church" by Hozier.

Duffy graduated from Queen's in 2023 and signed with Irish indie label Rubyworks before releasing several successful singles including "Into the West" and "Realta". Duffy's music blends neoclassical, traditional and popular elements together, predominantly through piano, tin whistle, voice and orchestration. He has stated that his inspiration comes from Ludovico Einaudi, Enya and Irish traditional music in general, amongst many other artists.

Duffy has written and been featured on tracks with Kingfishr, The Coronas, Peter Sandberg, Sarah Cothran, Patrick Dexter and Moncrieff.

In 2024, Duffy began collaborating with Icelandic composer Atli Örvarsson, who produced several pieces of Duffy's, including his debut EP On a Wing. In July 2024 Duffy supported Andrea Bocelli at BST Hyde Park in London, before embarking on his debut Irish and European tour, which was expanded into 2025. In 2025 he performed two sold out shows in the main room of the National Concert Hall in Dublin, including a St Patrick's Day show, being one of the youngest people to ever headline the room on their own.

Duffy is currently scoring several projects for film and TV, and released his self-titled debut album in October 2025.

== Discography ==
=== Albums ===
List of albums, with selected details and chart positions
Title	Album details	Peak chart positions			
Title	Album details	IRE	IRE Indie	UK Classic	UK Digital
Jamie Duffy	Released: 10 October 2025; Label: Rubyworks; Formats: CD, digital download, streaming	7	1	5	90
