= One Plum Blossom =

Taiwanese television drama series

One Plum Blossom (Chinese: 一剪梅; pinyin: Yī jiǎn méi) is a 1984 TV series shown on Taiwan's China Television, starring Shen Hai-jung (沈海蓉) and Kou Shih-hsiun (寇世勳) and set in 1930s China. It aired 25 episodes from December 17, 1984, to January 18, 1985, every Monday to Friday evening at 8.00 pm.

Two remakes of the drama have been made: Grief Over Qinghe River (2000) starring Jiang Qinqin (蒋勤勤) and Vincent Zhao, and New One Plum Blossom (2009) starring Lu Yi and Wallace Huo.

== Theme ==
The theme song, Yi jian mei, was sung by Taiwanese singer Fei Yu-ching.

== Plot ==
The fiery Shen Xinci runs away from her psychopathic fiancé, Liang Yongchang, after finding out the truth. On the way she meets Zhao Shijun, who sympathizes with her and gives her some money to pay off her father's medical bills. After the death of her father, Xinci decides to find Shijun and repay his kindness, no matter the request.

For the sake of the water supply and to make peace between the two towns of Shahe and Wanjiazhuang, Zhao Shijun is forced to marry Mayor Wan's daughter, Wan Qiuling. On the way back to her new home, Qiuling, who has been seriously ill since childhood, falls sick; but is rescued by a mysterious doctor, Liang Yongchang. He tells her that her disease can be cured, but she will not be able to give birth to a child in the future. Desperate to keep the family going, Qiuling takes Yongchang's advice and she drugs her husband and switches places with another woman, so that the woman can get pregnant instead of her; however, the woman turns out to be Shen Xinci, which causes Yongchang to go out to seek revenge on Zhao Shijun and everyone that is in his way, which results in Xinci's death.

== Later versions ==
=== Grief Over Qinghe River ===
Grief Over Qinghe River (青河絕恋) is a 2000 remake with 30 episodes, starring Jiang Qinqin (蒋勤勤) and Vincent Zhao.

It was shot entirely in Mainland China. Compared to the 1984 original series, the main origins of the story had not changed.

=== New One Plum Blossom ===
New One Plum Blossom (新一剪梅; Xīn Yī Jiǎn Méi) is a 2009 remake consisting of 40 episodes and starring Lu Yi and Wallace Huo. It was also shot in Mainland China.

Although the names of the characters and the origins of the story (Shahe and Wanjiazhuang's water source conflict) in this remake are the same as the original series, many new elements were added to the story, including the development of the characters and their relationships, resulting in a relatively different plot from the previous version.

== See also ==
- A Spray of Plum Blossoms
