= My Name Is Not Merv Griffin =

"My Name Is Not Merv Griffin" is a 1982 novelty song by Gary Muller. It is a parody of Je cherche après Titine with music by Léo Daniderff and lyrics by Louis Mauban and Marcel Bertal. The melody is the same as that of Charlie Chaplin's nonsense-song performance toward the end of his 1936 film, Modern Times.

The song is based on the singer's lament that he supposedly resembles celebrity talk show host Merv Griffin and that Griffin's fans are stalking him, with disconcerting consequences. The song was popularized by repeated airplay on the Dr. Demento Show and was featured on the 1983 album Demento's Mementos. In 1991 the song was played during the inaugural KRXQ Tuesday morning drive time radio show called "Toilet Bowl of Tone-Deaf Tunes". It was also recorded by the Dartmouth Aires and was released on the 2000 album Best of College A Cappella Humor: Wasting Our Parents' Money.

== Reception ==
The album Demento's Mementos was reviewed by Fanfare, with low marks for its "sophomoric... mildly amusing" songs, except for "My Name Is Not Merv Griffin" which stood above the rest as "about as off-the-wall, and funny, as a song can get." A reviewer of The Globe and Mail described the song as one of the "unheralded classics" on the Demento's Mementos disc. The book "Comedy on record: the complete critical discography" (1988) describes the song as having "influences ranging from "Beep Beep" to "They're Coming to Take Me Away" and reports that it "requires tremendous patience to sit through."

== Covers ==
- The Dartmouth Aires on the 2000 album "Best of College A Cappella Humor: Wasting Our Parents Money".
- Luke Ski, with music and background vocals by Power Salad.
- Mr. Bungle performed a cover of it during a recorded rehearsal in 1989.
