= Moncrieff (singer) =

Irish singer-songwriter

- Born: Tramore, County Waterford, Ireland
- Genres: Pop
- Occupations: Singer; songwriter
- Labels: Warner Music

Chris Breheny, known professionally as Moncrieff, is an Irish pop singer and songwriter living in London.

== Early life ==
Breheny grew up in a small town in Ireland, where, in his early youth, he saw no opportunity to pursue music. When he lost his sister at the age of 16 and his brother two years later (both suffered from the metabolic disease cystic fibrosis), he found solace in songs and eventually began writing his own songs.

== Musical career ==
To fully pursue his music career, Moncrieff dropped out of law school and moved to London at the age of 19, where he worked at the Banana Tree restaurant chain in West Hampstead and regularly attended open mics. At one of his performances, a drummer friend asked him if he would like to participate in a BBC TV special with Adele, which led to his first paid gig.

Moncrieff debut single, "Symptoms," was released in 2017. After being featured on Elton John's radio show Rocket Hour, BBC Radio 1 included the song in its program.

On 9 May 2025, Moncrieff released his debut studio album, Maybe It's Fine, which he worked on for 10 years. It peaked at number 1 in the Irish charts on 22 May 2025.

== Discography ==
=== Studio albums ===
Year	Album details	Peak chart positions
Year	Album details	IRL
2025	Maybe It's Fine: Released: 9 May 2025; Label: Warner Music; Formats: CD, Download	1
"—" denotes a title that did not chart.

=== EPs ===
- 2019: The Early Hurts [Neo Noir Records]
- 2022: Warm [energie] No.54 Ireland
- 2023: Highways & Hurricanes, BMG [energie, BMG]

=== Mixtapes ===
- 2024: selfcare [energie, BMG]

=== Singles ===
- 2017: Symptoms [0e0e Ltd]
- 2018: Serial Killer (mit JUDGE) [Grape.Vn Records]
- 2019: Ghost [Neo Noir Records]
- 2019: Like I Do [Neo Noir Records]
- 2019: With All Due Respect (Like I Do Reprise)
- 2020: in my room (Demo) [Neo Noir Records]
- 2020: America [Neo Noir Records]
- 2022: Ruin [energie]
- 2022: I'm With You [energie]
- 2022: Perfect [energie, BMG]
- 2022: What Am I Here For [energie, BMG]
- 2023: Love Somebody [energie, BMG]
- 2024: Unlove You [energie, BMG]
- 2024: How It Ends [Warner Music]
- 2024: i just don't think I'll make it over you. [Warner Music]
- 2025: Hard Feelings [Warner Music]
- 2025: Shangri-La [Warner Music]

== Awards and nominations ==
Award	Year	Category	Nominee(s)	Result	Ref.
RTÉ Choice Music Prize	2023	Irish Song of the Year	Warm	Won	
