= How the Grinch Stole Christmas (soundtrack) =

Dr. Seuss' How the Grinch Stole Christmas (Original Motion Picture Soundtrack)

Soundtrack album by various artists
- Released: November 7, 2000
- Recorded: 2000
- Genres: Christmas; pop; rock; film score
- Length: 73:19
- Label: Interscope
- Producers: James Horner; Simon Rhodes; Randy Kerber

James Horner chronology
The Perfect Storm (2000)	How the Grinch Stole Christmas (2000)	Enemy at the Gates (2001)

Dr. Seuss' How the Grinch Stole Christmas (Original Motion Picture Soundtrack) is the soundtrack album to the 2000 film How the Grinch Stole Christmas directed by Ron Howard. The soundtrack was released on November 7, 2000, through Interscope Records and featured a collection of music performed by several artists, including Busta Rhymes, Faith Hill, Eels, Smash Mouth, and NSYNC, and the original score composed by James Horner.

== Background and development ==
James Horner composed the film score which was recorded at the Todd-AO Scoring Stage in Studio City, Los Angeles, and Horner conducted the complete orchestra from the Hollywood Studio Symphony which was orchestrated by James Horner, J. A. C. Redford and Randy Kerber. The score was written in around six weeks. Describing the process on balancing the emotional moments and comedic overtones, Horner said "It's like being a tightrope walker with one foot in the air at all times. My feeling is that the funniness is going to come through whatever, so I tend to err on the side of making things emotive."

For the recording sessions, Horner's crew members decorated the place with Christmas tree stands for the musicians to know that they were working on the film. They had previously did a similar achievement when they decorated the stage with ships and plastic frogmen while Horner worked on his most recent project, The Perfect Storm. Horner utilized tangles of cellos and electronic synthesizers and twisted plastic hoses which was created by Horner's team to make the odd sounds coming from the baroque-meets-dali instruments curated by Dr. Seuss for the Whoville town band. The instruments produced a vibrating honk-like sound which was "plaintive and hostile". One instrument that had a slide, similar to a trombone had two people work on it.

The recording for the climactic sequence was held on August 2000 with Howard supervising the final day of recording, discussing of how the music worked with the dialogue and Carrey's performance.

== Critical reception ==
Heather Phares of AllMusic wrote "Though a more typically quirky composer like Danny Elfman would have been a more obvious choice to score an off-kilter fantasy like this, Horner's compositions manage to strike a good balance between edgy humor and sentimentality" with the songs adding "an appropriately eclectic, whimsical touch to the soundtrack". Christian Clemmensen of Filmtracks wrote "How the Grinch Stole Christmas relies solely on the majesty of its final, lovely cues to reach your heart." Stephen Holden of The New York Times called it "gimmickry, saccharine music". Todd McCarthy of Variety wrote "Musical elements are diverse, ranging from James Horner's decent original score to several songs new and old." Benjamin Hathaway of MovieWeb called it "one of his most diverse scores, and he does a marvelous job of incorporating sound in a way that seems as if it genuinely could have come from some wacky Whoville musical instrument".

== Track listing ==
All music is composed by James Horner, except where noted.

No.	Title	Writer(s)	Performed by	Length
1.	"Kids Today" (Dialogue)		Taylor Momsen; Jim Carrey	0:21
2.	"Grinch 2000"	Dr. Seuss; Albert Hague	Busta Rhymes featuring Jim Carrey	3:34
3.	"Green Christmas"	Steven Page; Ed Robertson	Barenaked Ladies	2:35
4.	"Christmas of Love"	Rick Chertoff; David Forman; Rob Hyman	Little Isidore and the Inquisitors	2:19
5.	"Lonely Christmas Eve"	Ben Folds	Folds	3:19
6.	"Grinch Schedule" (Dialogue)			0:40
7.	"Better Do It Right"	Greg Camp	Smash Mouth	3:10
8.	"Whoville Medley (Perfect Christmas Night/Grinch)"	Paul O'Neill; Robert Kinkel; Jon Oliva	Patti Russo; Trans-Siberian Orchestra	4:59
9.	"Reindeer" (Dialogue)			0:35
10.	"Christmas Is Going to the Dogs"	Mark Oliver Everett	Eels	2:57
11.	"You're a Mean One, Mr. Grinch"	Seuss; Hague	Carrey	2:31
12.	"Christmas Means More" (Dialogue)			0:49
13.	"You Don't Have to Be Alone (On Christmas)"	JC Chasez; Veit Renn; David Nicoll	*NSYNC	4:33
14.	"Where Are You, Christmas?"	Horner; Will Jennings; Mariah Carey	Faith Hill	4:07
15.	"The Shape of Things to Come"			6:31
16.	"Memories of a Green Childhood"			3:28
17.	"Christmas, Why Can't I Find You?"	Horner; Jennings; Carey	Momsen	2:09
18.	"Stealing Christmas"			6:55
19.	"The Big Heist"			4:01
20.	"Does Cindy Lou Really Ruin Christmas?"			4:10
21.	"A Change of Heart"			3:44
22.	"The Sleigh of Presents"			6:01
23.	"He Carves the Roast Beast"			3:10

== Expanded edition ==
An expanded edition of the soundtrack featuring Horner's complete score was released on November 1, 2022, on La-La Land Records.

No.	Title	Length
1.	"The Shape of Things to Come" (Includes "Happy Who-Lidays") (Extended Version)	6:36
2.	"Meet the Mayor"	1:25
3.	"Post Office"	4:25
4.	"Dumpit to Crumpit"	1:03
5.	"Christmas, Why Can't I Find You?"	2:08
6.	"The Grinch at Home"	1:54
7.	"Who-Babies, Who-Babies Everywhere"	2:02
8.	"The Grinch in School"	1:46
9.	"Memories of a Green Childhood"	3:31
10.	"The Book of Who"	1:54
11.	"Cindy Lou Falls"	2:48
12.	"Grinch Arrives"	1:25
13.	"Grinch as Cheermeister"	2:18
14.	"Razor Sharp Memories"	0:50
15.	"Celebration Breakdown"	4:26
16.	"Grinch Back on Mt. Crumpit"	1:40
17.	"A Wonderful / Awful Idea"	0:48
18.	"You're a Mean One, Mr. Grinch"	2:35
19.	"Max Gets a New Nose"	0:36
20.	"Stealing Christmas" (Instrumental Version)	6:53
21.	"The Big Heist"	4:03
22.	"Does Cindy Lou Really Ruin Christmas?" (Extended Version)	4:26
23.	"A Change of the Heart"	3:43
24.	"The Sleigh of Presents"	6:02
25.	"He Carves the Roast Beast" (Includes "Welcome Christmas")	3:11
Total length:		72:28

== Personnel ==
Credits adapted from liner notes:

- Music composer – James Horner
- Music producer – James Horner, Simon Rhodes, Randy Kerber
- Sound designer – Ian Underwood, Randy Kerber
- Recording – Simon Rhodes, David Marquette
- Mixing – Simon Rhodes
- Mastering – Christopher Landen
- Music editors – Allan Ramsay, Christopher Landen, Paul Baily
- Project manager – Frank K. DeWald
- Music coordinator – Julyce Monbleaux
- Music preparation – Bob Bornstein
- Additional music preparation – Randy Kerber
- Copyist – Alan L. Silva, Andrew J. Kinney, David A. Izzard, David Horne, David Wells, Emmet Estren, Howard J. Segurson, Jeffrey Hoyt Jones, Joseph McGuire, Kendall Roclord, Kirby Furlong, Margaret J. Maryatt, Robert Meurer, Stephen A. Cartotto, Steven Juliani, Victor Sagerquist
- Art direction – Jim Titus
- Liner notes – Jeff Bond

Orchestra

- Performer – Hollywood Studio Symphony
- Conductor and leader – James Horner
- Orchestration – James Horner, J. A. C. Redford, Randy Kerber
- Additional orchestration – J. Eric Schmidt, Joseph Alfuso, Richard Stone, Steven J. Bernstein
- Orchestra contractor – Sandy DeCrescent
- Scoring staff – Andy Bass, Jay Selvester, Kirsten Smith, Marc Gebauer

Choir

- Vocal contractor – Luana Jackman
- Choir – Amick Byram, Augie Castagnola, Bob Joyce, Bobbi Page, Caitlin Gorfaine, Clydene Jackson-Edwards, Cord Jackman, D.J. Harper, Emily Horner, Geoff Koch, Johnnie Hall, Jon Joyce, Karen Harper, Kevin Dorsey, Linda Harmon, Luana Jackman, Mollie Hall, Randy Crenshaw, Rick Logan, Roger Freedland, Sally Stevens, Susan Boyd, Susan Stevens Logan, Terry Wood

Instruments

- Accordion – Frank Marocco
- Basses – Bruce P. Morgenthaler, Christian C. Kollgaard, Charles Domanico, Drew D. Dembowski, Edward Meares, Michael Valerio, Nico C. Abondolo, Oscar Hidalgo, Richard Feves, Steve Edelman, Susan A. Ranney
- Bassoons – Kenneth E. Munday, Michael R. O'Donovan
- Cellos – Armen Ksajikian, Cecilia Tsan, Christine Ermacoff, Dane R. Little, David Low, David Speltz, Dennis Karmazyn, Douglas L. Davis, John A. Walz, Matthew Cooker, Paul A. Cohen, Paula Hochhalter, Roger Lebow, Rowena Hammill, Sebastian Toettcher, Stephen P. Erdody, Steve Richards, Timothy E. Landauer
- Clarinets – Daniel L. Higgins, Emily Bernstein, Gary S. Bovyer, James M. Kanter, Steven A. Roberts, Thomas Scott
- Flutes – Geraldine Rotella, Louise M. DiTullio, Sheridon W. Stokes
- French Horns – Brian D. A. O'Connor, Daniel P. Kelley, James W. Thatcher, John A. Reynolds, Kristy Morrell, Kurt G. Snyder, Phillip E. Yao, Richard J. Todd, Steven B. Becknell, Todd L. Miller
- Harps – Gayle Levant, Jo Ann Turovsky
- Keyboards – Ian R. Underwood, Randy M. Kerber
- Oboes – Barbara Northcutt, Thomas G. Boyd
- Percussions – Robert J. Zimmitti, Daniel L. Greco, Donald J. Williams, Gregory Goodall, Michael Fisher, Peter Limonick, Steven Schaeffer, Thomas D. Raney
- Trombones – Alan L. Kaplan, Andrew T. Malloy, Robert F. Sanders, George B. Thatcher, Loren Marsteller, Michael M. Hoffman, Phillip Teele, William C. Booth
- Trumpets – David W. Washburn, Jon Lewis, Timothy G. Morrison
- Tubas – James M. Self
- Violas – Andrew Picken, Carolyn Riley, Carrie Holzman-Little, Dan Lionel Neufeld, Darrin E. McCann, David F. Walther Jr., Denyse N. Buffum, Janet Lakatos, John Scanlon, Karie L. Prescott, Marlow G. Fisher, Matthew J. Funes, Michael Nowak, Michael Ramos, Mihail Zinovyev, Pamela Goldsmith, Piotr T. Jandula, Rick Gerding, Robert L. Becker, Robin R. Ross, Roland Kato, Ron Strauss, Simon Oswell, Steven A. Gordon
- Violins – Aimee Kreston, Alan H. Grunfeld, Amy Hershberger, Anatoly Rosinsky, Armen Garabedian, Berj Garabedian, Bruce Dukov, Clayton Haslop, Connie Kupka Speltz, Darius Campo, Dimitrie Leivici, Endre Granat, Eun-Mee Ahn, Franklyn D'Antonio, Galina Golovin Zherdev, Haim Shtrum, Harris Goldman, Jacqueline I. Brand, Julie Ann Gigante, Karen Elaine Bakunin, Karen Jones, Kathleen Lenski, Katia K. Popov, Kenneth Yerke, Liane Mautner Reynolds, Lisa M. Sutton Johnson, Mario DeLeon, Mark D. Robertson, Miran Haig Kojian, Miwako Watanabe, Natalie Leggett, Patricia Johnson, Phillip Levy, Polly H. Sweeney, Rafael Rishik, Rene M. Mandel, Richard L. Altenbach, Robert L. Brosseau, Robin Olson, Roger D. Wilkie, Sid Page, Tamara L. Hatwan Chang

Management

- Music business affairs for Universal Music Enterprises – Sean Roderick
- Production coordinator for Universal Music Enterprises – Paul Hall
- Music business and legal affairs for Universal Pictures – Michael Dyson, Tanya Perara
- Executive in charge of music for Universal Pictures – Mike Knobloch
- Music publishing executive for Universal Pictures – Eric Polin
- Soundtrack marketing and coordination for Universal Pictures – Nikki Walsh, Zach Grossman

== Accolades ==
Award	Category	Recipient	Result	Ref.
2000 Stinkers Bad Movie Awards	Worst Song or Song Performance	"Christmas, Why Can't I Find You?" by Taylor Momsen	Nominated	
ASCAP Film and Television Music Awards	Top Box Office Films	James Horner (also for The Perfect Storm)	Won	
27th Saturn Awards	Best Music	James Horner	Won	
