= Ode to the Republic of China =

1980 Taiwanese patriotic song

The Ode to the Republic of China (traditional Chinese: 中華民國頌; simplified Chinese: 中华民国颂; pinyin: Zhōnghuá Mínguó Sòng; Wade–Giles: Chung^{1}hua^{2} Min^{2}kuo^{2} sung^{4}), also translated as Praise the Republic of China, is a patriotic song of Taiwan. It was composed in 1980 by Liu Chia-chang.

According to Chang and Holt, the song's lyrics uses geographical locations to invoke nostalgia for mainland China and misery in the sense that the listener could not return to the mainland.

== See also ==
- Chinese unification
- Cross-Strait relations
- One-China policy
- Political status of Taiwan
- Two Chinas
- Zhonghua minzu
