= Fei Yu-ching =

Taiwanese singer (born 1955)

- 費玉清
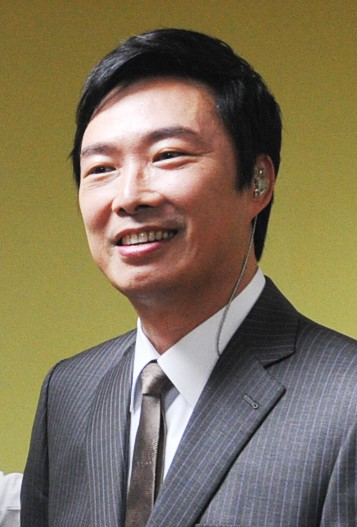
- Fei in 2012
- Born: Chang Yen-ting (張彥亭); 17 July 1955 (age 71); Taipei, Taiwan
- Occupations: Singer; television host
- Years active: 1973–2020
- Relatives: Chang Fei (brother); Heng Shu (sister)
- Awards: Golden Bell Awards (1984, 1995, 1997, 2005); Golden Melody Award (1996)
- Musical career
- Genres: Mandopop; Taiwanese pop; Folk
- Instrument: Vocals
- Labels: Haishan Records; Tony Records; Tianxia Records; UFO Records; Warner Music Taiwan; Universal Music Taiwan; Sony Music Taiwan

Chinese name
- Traditional Chinese: 費玉清
- Simplified Chinese: 费玉清
Transcriptions
Standard Mandarin
- Hanyu Pinyin: Fèi Yùqīng

Birth name
- Traditional Chinese: 張彥亭
- Simplified Chinese: 张彦亭
Transcriptions
Standard Mandarin
- Hanyu Pinyin: Zhāng Yàntíng

Fei Yu-ching (traditional Chinese: 費玉清; simplified Chinese: 费玉清; pinyin: Fèi Yùqīng; born Chang Yen-ting; 17 July 1955) is a Taiwanese retired singer and former television host. He is best known for his distinctive singing voice, formal stage attire, and characteristic upward-facing singing posture in Mandopop. His best-known songs include "Yi Jian Mei" (一翦梅), "Good Night Song" (晚安曲), "Meng Tuo Ling" (夢駝鈴), and "Ode to the Republic of China" (中華民國頌).

Born in Taipei, Taiwan, to a waishengren family, Fei began his career in 1973 and initially gained recognition for performing patriotic songs and traditional-style Mandarin ballads. He received the Male Singing Performer Award at the 19th Golden Bell Awards in 1984, and his album Good Night Song won a Golden Melody Award in 1996. During the 1990s, he expanded into television hosting, appearing alongside his brother Chang Fei on the variety program The Fantastic Brothers (龍兄虎弟), for which they won a Golden Bell Award in 1995. He won two additional Golden Bell Awards for television hosting in 1997 and 2005.

In 2006, Fei collaborated with singer-songwriter Jay Chou on the duet "Faraway" (千里之外). He continued recording, appearing on television, and performing concerts throughout the 2000s and 2010s. In September 2018, Fei announced his retirement from the entertainment industry due to the deaths of his parents. He concluded his 46-year singing career with a 37-concert farewell tour. He performed his final concert at the Taipei Arena on 7 November 2019.

== Early life ==
Fei Yu-ching was born Chang Yen-ting (張彥亭) on 17 July 1955, in Taipei, Taiwan. He was the youngest of three children. His mother, Tan Hsiu-hsia (譚秀霞), was born in Anhua County, Hunan, China. His father, Chang Wu-hsi (張舞曦), was born in Tongcheng, Anhui, China, and worked as the editor-in-chief of a newspaper. His eldest sister, Chang Yen-chiung (張彥瓊), pursued a singing career under the stage name Jenny Fei (費貞綾). His older brother, Chang Yen-ming (張彥明), also became a singer, adopting the stage name Chang Fei (張菲).

Fei graduated from Hsieh-ho Vocational School (協和工商) in Taipei. His sister gave him the stage name Fei Yu-ching, adapting the name of a television drama character, 費玉青, by changing the final character from 青 to 清. In 1972, Fei participated in Star to Star (星對星), a singing competition organized by China Television, winning first place in the competition's second stage. In the following year's final, he performed the song "Yanyu Xieyang" (煙雨斜陽; "Misty Rain and Setting Sun") and finished in fourth place. Following the competition, he began his professional singing career as an affiliated singer with China Television.

Before completing his mandatory military service, Fei was introduced by his sister to the Disijiao Nightclub (迪斯角夜總會), a popular entertainment venue in Taipei, where he performed as an opening singer and received a favorable response from audiences. During his military service, Fei successfully auditioned for the Lu Kuang Arts and Entertainment Troupe (陸光藝工隊), performing in recreational activities for military personnel until his discharge. In 1977, through his sister's recommendation, Fei gained the recognition of songwriter and producer Liu Chia-chang.

== Career ==
=== 1970s–1980s: Recording career and breakthrough ===
Following his discharge from military service, Fei began recording professionally, releasing his first albums through Haishan Records (海山唱片), although they were only modest commercial hits. His early career coincided with the Kuomintang (KMT) government's campaign to promote "purified songs" (淨化歌曲), and he became known for performing music associated with the campaign. In 1979, he recorded the patriotic song "Guo-en Jiaqing" (國恩家慶), which received extensive exposure through broadcasts on Taiwan's three principal television networks. He subsequently gained wider recognition through recordings of patriotic songs including "Ode to the Republic of China" (中華民國頌), "The Changing Great Wall" (變色的長城), and "A Handful of Soil for You" (送你一把泥土).

Among his best-known recordings was "Good Night Song" (晚安曲), written by songwriter Liu Chia-chang. The song was used by China Television at the conclusion of its daily broadcasts and subsequently became a familiar closing song in Taiwanese businesses and military establishments. Alongside his patriotic repertoire, Fei performed ballads, folk songs, and traditional-style popular music, including the television drama theme songs "Yi Jian Mei" (一翦梅) and "Tiaofu" (挑夫).

"Yi Jian Mei" was originally included on his 1983 album Changjiang Shui: Ci Qing Yong Bu Liu (長江水·此情永不留). The song gained widespread popularity the following year when it was used as the theme for the television drama of the same name. In 1984, Fei received the Male Singing Performer Award at the 19th Golden Bell Awards. Other songs associated with his recording career during this period included "Meng Tuo Ling" (夢駝鈴), "Changfa de Nülang" (長髮的女郎), and "Chuliuxiang Xinzhuan" (楚留香新傳). He also recorded other Taiwanese albums, performing songs such as "Weihe Ni Aizhe Bieren" (為何你愛著別人) and "Suixin Lian" (碎心戀).

=== 1990s–2005: Television hosting ===
In 1993, Fei began co-hosting the Taiwan Television variety program The Fantastic Brothers (龍兄虎弟) with his older brother, entertainer Chang Fei. The program combined celebrity interviews, musical performances, and comedy. Fei became particularly known for impersonating other singers, imitating performers including Fong Fei-fei, Frankie Kao, and Chen Hsiao-yun through their vocal styles and stage mannerisms. His impersonations earned him the nickname "Myna Bird" (九官鳥), while his habit of telling risqué jokes led to the nickname "Emperor of Variety Shows" (秀場黃帝). In 1995, Fei and Chang received the Variety Program Host Award at the 30th Golden Bell Awards for their work on The Fantastic Brothers.

Fei also continued releasing recordings during the 1990s, including the album Good Night Song (晚安曲), which won the Best Vocal Album Award at the seventh Golden Melody Awards in 1996. The album also earned him a nomination for Best Mandarin Male Singer at the same ceremony.

In 1995, Fei began hosting the music program Jinxiao Huayueye (今宵花月夜), his first experience independently presenting a music-oriented television show. He subsequently hosted Jinsang Jinshang (金嗓金賞), winning the Variety Program Host Award at the 32nd Golden Bell Awards in 1997 alongside co-host Luo Shih-feng. He later hosted Fei Yu-ching Time (費玉清時間), a program in which he revisited and interpreted classic Chinese-language songs.

In 2003, his album Fenghua Zaixian (風華再現) received a nomination for Best Mandarin Male Singer at the 14th Golden Melody Awards. The same year, he began hosting the television music program Fei Yu-ching's Music (費玉清的清音樂), which featured musical performances and spontaneous duets with invited guests. At the 40th Golden Bell Awards in 2005, he received the Singing and Music Program Host Award for the program. Fei Yu-ching's Music also won the award for Best Singing and Music Program that year.

=== 2006–2017: Collaboration with Jay Chou and later performances ===
In 2006, Fei collaborated with Taiwanese singer-songwriter Jay Chou on the duet "Faraway" (千里之外), released on Chou's album Still Fantasy (依然范特西). Their collaboration brought together the singers' contrasting musical styles and introduced Fei's work to younger audiences. Fei also appeared in the music video for the song.

Alongside recording and television appearances, Fei undertook regular concert tours in Taiwan beginning in 2003. His concerts combined Mandarin and Taiwanese Hokkien standards with popular songs from different generations, as well as comedy and impersonation routines.

Following the conclusion of his 2013 concert tour and the death of his mother, Fei suspended his concerts in Taiwan to spend more time with his father. He returned to performing concerts in Taiwan in 2017, announcing appearances at the Taipei Arena in June. During his later career, Fei also became active in mainland China singing competition programs, appearing as an established performer and mentor. His performances included interpretations of more contemporary songs, such as Eason Chan's "Ten Years" (十年), Hebe Tien's "A Little Happiness" (小幸運), and Angela Chang's "Invisible Wings" (隱形的翅膀).

=== 2018–2020: Farewell tour and retirement ===
Fei in 2019

On 27 September 2018, Fei announced in an open letter that he would retire from the entertainment industry following a farewell concert tour in 2019. He explained that the deaths of both his parents had left him feeling increasingly isolated while performing and that he wished to pursue a quieter life away from the entertainment industry. His farewell tour began on 8 February 2019 at the Taipei Arena, where he performed a selection of Mandarin and Hokkien classics alongside contemporary popular songs. During the performance, he became emotional while singing "Good Night Song" and briefly interrupted the song before continuing. At the opening concert, Fei also announced that he would donate NT$20 million to charitable organizations in healthcare, child welfare, and animal protection.

The farewell tour ultimately comprised 37 concerts worldwide, including ten performances in Taiwan and appearances in the United States, Australia, Singapore, Malaysia, mainland China, and Hong Kong. Fei held the final concert of the tour at the Taipei Arena on 7 November 2019, concluding his 46-year singing career. The performance featured songs from different periods of his career, including "Yi Jian Mei", "Good Night Song", "I Only Care About You" (我只在乎你), and "Night Fragrance" (夜來香). Following audience requests for an encore, Fei performed several additional songs and became emotional while thanking the audience for its support.

Fei also participated in the Chinese television singing competition Our Song (我們的歌), which he identified as his final television program before retirement. The program continued airing into January 2020, with Fei performing "Good Night Song" during its finale on 19 January.

Following his retirement, "Yi Jian Mei" experienced renewed international popularity in 2020 after a lyric from the song became a viral internet meme on short-video platforms. The renewed attention brought the recording into the top three of Spotify's viral music rankings in several countries.

== Personal life ==
In 1981, he was engaged to Chie Yasui, a Japanese actress, but he called off the wedding because the Yasui family expected Fei to enter matrilocal residence, switch to Japanese citizenship and give up his career in Taiwan. He remained single thereafter.
