= Yi Jian Mei (song) =

1983 song by Fei Yu-Ching

Single by Fei Yu-ching

from the album Water of the Yangtze River
- Language: Mandarin Chinese
- Released: April 1983
- Recorded: 1983
- Genre: Mandopop
- Length: 3:43
- Label: Tony Wang (東尼機構)
- Composers: Hsin-i Chen (陳信義; Chen I/陳怡)
- Lyricists: Yuchen Chen (陳玉貞; Wawa/娃娃)
- Producers: Arranger: Chen Chih-yuan (陳志遠); Producer: Chunchen Chen (陳俊辰)

Official audio
- "費玉清 - 一翦梅 Yu-Ching Fei- Yi Jian Mei (xue hua piao piao bei feng xiao xiao)[Official Lyric Video]" on YouTube

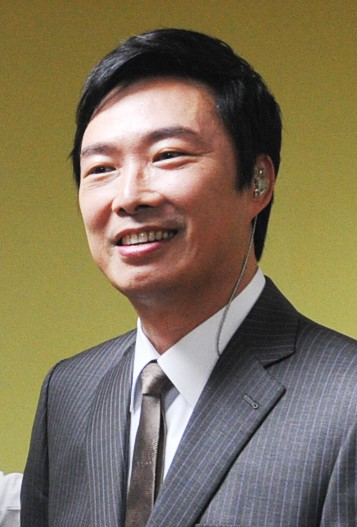
Singer Fei Yu-ching in 2012

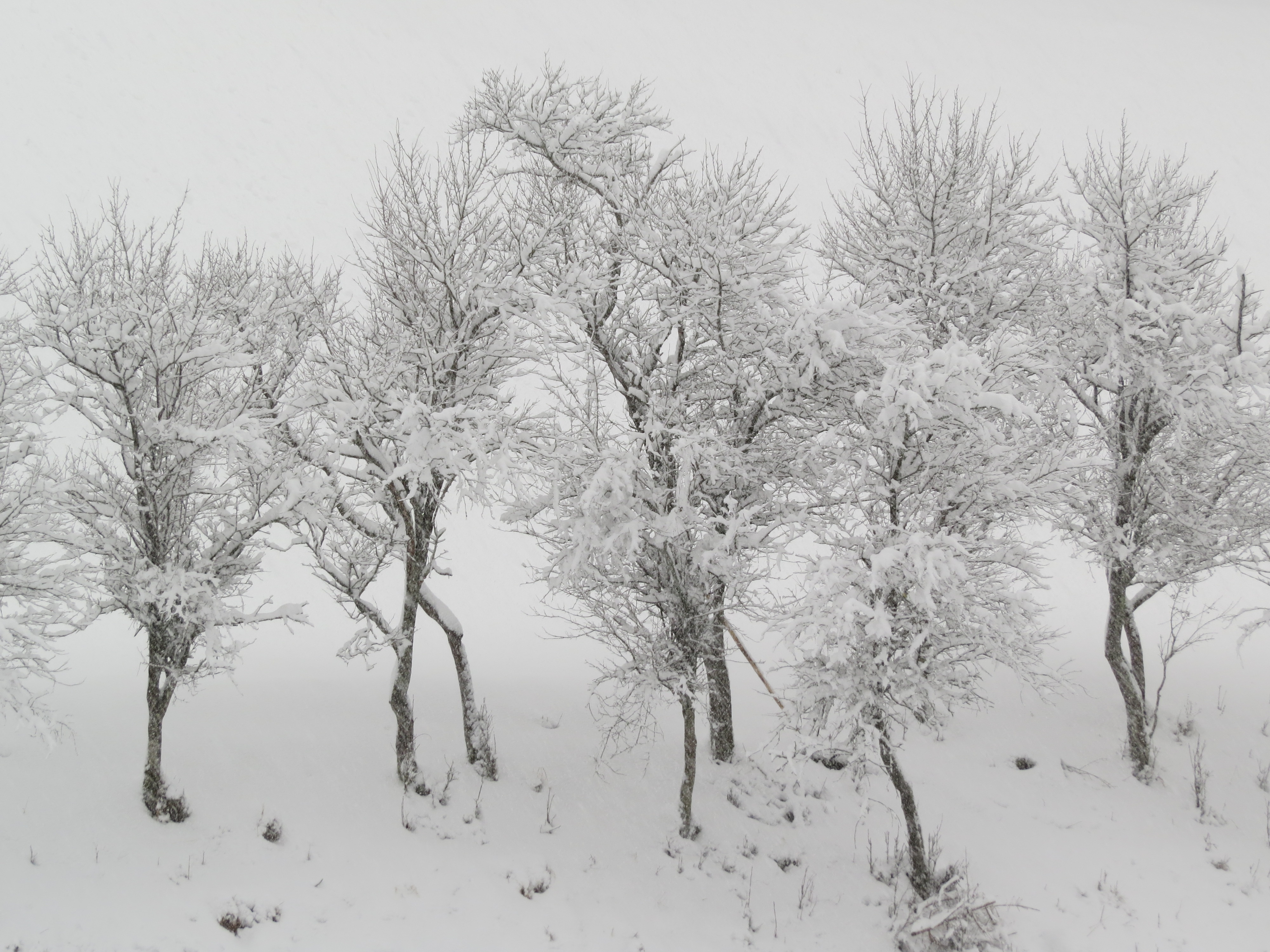
Plum trees in winter

"Yi Jian Mei" (Chinese: 一剪梅; pinyin: Yī jiǎn méi; lit. 'One Trim of Plum Blossom'), (Note: The original title of the track on the album was written with a different character, as 一翦梅, which is the name of a ci-poetic tune pattern (詞牌; cípái). Later, the track was used as the theme song for the eponymous 1984 Taiwanese drama. Since the drama adopted 一剪梅 as its title, theme song title, and ci-poetic tune pattern title, the song also became known as 一剪梅.) also commonly referred to by its popular lyrics "Xue hua piao piao bei feng xiao xiao" (Chinese: 雪花飄飄 北風蕭蕭; pinyin: Xuěhuā piāopiāo běi fēng xiāoxiāo; trans. "Snowflakes drifting, the north wind whistling"), is a 1983 Mandopop song by Taiwanese singer Fei Yu-ching, first released on his 1983 album Water of the Yangtze River (長江水; Chángjiāng shuǐ). A new version was released on Fei's 2010 album Boundless Love (天之大; Tiān zhī dà).

Widely regarded as the signature song of Fei's music career, "Yi Jian Mei" is a melancholic love song using winter plum blossoms as an analogy for enduring love through hardship. It has been a popular song in Greater China since the 1980s and is considered a timeless classic. It was used as the theme song for the eponymous 1984 Taiwanese drama One Plum Blossom, produced by China Television.

In early 2020, a selfie phone video clip of Chinese actor Zhang Aiqin (張愛欽) performing the song went viral, leading to it being shared in thousands of internet memes and spawning various cover videos across the internet. Originally known in China for several movies and television works, Zhang became commonly known online as "Chinese eggman", as a reference to his egg-shaped head in the original video.

== Background ==
Fei's 1983 Mandarin-language album Water of the Yangtze River first included the song, which was originally planned as the theme song of a Taiwanese TV drama series entitled Dreaming Back to the Border Town (邊城夢回). Even though the series was ultimately not released, the song was instead adopted as the theme song for the 1984 Taiwanese TV drama One Plum Blossom, and thus it was popularized among Taiwanese people.

In 1988, One Plum Blossom aired on CCTV, which boosted the popularity of both the song and Fei himself in Mainland China; the song was reused as the theme song for New One Plum Blossom (新一剪梅), a 2009 Chinese remake version of the 1983 TV series, starring Wallace Huo.

In 2019, the Beijing-based Taiwanese singer Peter Chen performed the song at a Mid-Autumn Festival concert organized by CCTV. In the same year, Fei, who earlier announced his formal retirement, held farewell concerts in various places and performed the song in his final show at Taipei Arena on 7 November.

== Internet popularity ==
In January 2020, an original video was posted on the video sharing application Kuaishou by Beijing-based actor/director Zhang Aiqin, who filmed himself singing the verse "Xuěhuā piāopiāo běi fēng xiāoxiāo", somewhat off-tune while walking alone in a park covered by heavy snow. Zhang is known for having a bald and oddly egg-shaped head, which has gained him the nickname "Eggman" or "Duck Egg". His username on Kuaishou is "Brother Egg" (蛋哥; Dàn Gē).

In May, the song reached international audiences and became a meme on the video sharing app TikTok. This propelled the song to the top spots on the Spotify Viral 50 chart in countries like Norway, Sweden, Finland, and New Zealand.

The popularity of the internet meme caused official versions of "Yi Jian Mei" on music streaming services like YouTube Music to change the name of the song to include the now-famous verse following the official name.

Fei, who retired in November 2019, stated that he was both flattered and honored by the song's sudden international popularity, but also emphasized that he had already retired and would not return to the Mandopop scene.
