= Léo Daniderff =

French composer

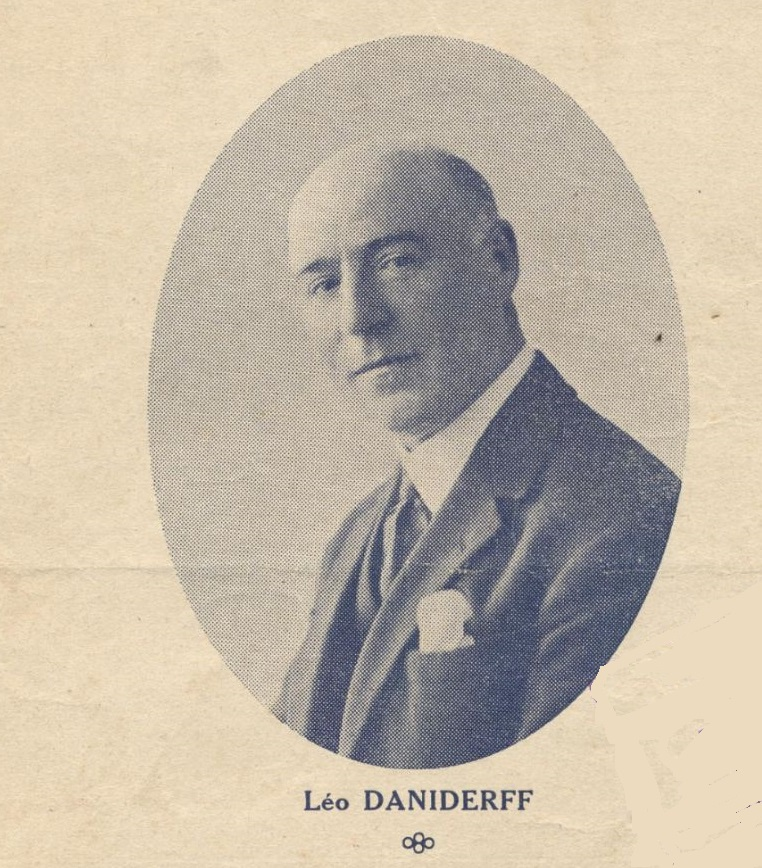
Léo Daniderff

Léo Daniderff (Gaston-Ferdinand Niquet; 16 February 1878 in Angers, France – 24 October 1943 in Rosny-sous-Bois, France) was a French composer of the pre-World War II era.

His 1917 comical song, a foxtrot-shimmy named "Je cherche après Titine" (lyrics by Louis Maubon and Marcel Bertal), became world-famous due to Charlie Chaplin's singing it in gibberish in Modern Times (1936), especially because it was the first time his character ever spoke in the movies and Chaplin did not want The Tramp to use any particular language. The title means "I am looking for Titine", and Titine is the diminutive of some feminine first names such as Martine and Clémentine.

In the United States this song appeared in 1925 in the Broadway musical Puzzles of 1925, and was recorded by tenor Billy Jones.

In Poland, the song was initially sung as a cabaret number by Eugeniusz Bodo with original lyrics by Andrzej Włast (signing as "Willy" on the music sheet), to a major success. A few years later, in 1939, the song was adapted again, into the "Wąsik, ach ten wąsik" ("Oh, what a moustache!") number and performed by Ludwik Sempoliński. This time the lyrics tried to "decide" who was funnier and who brought more to the world, Chaplin or Hitler. After the outbreak of the Second World War, the Gestapo tried to locate both Sempoliński and the lyricist, who was either Julian Tuwim or Marian Hemar, but failed to find either.

Around 1964, Jacques Brel also wrote a song named Titine, incorporating fragments of the melody and referencing both Daniderff's song and Chaplin.

Other singers were Georgette Plana and Yves Montand.

The song's copyright belongs or belonged to Editions Léon Agel and Les Nouvelles Editions Méridian.

Daniderff's other hit song, "Sur la Riviera", was used as the theme for Jean Renoir's film Boudu Saved from Drowning (1932).

The song was parodied by Gary Muller in 1982 as "My Name Is Not Merv Griffin".
