= 2023 Chinese Figure Skating Championships =

Figure skating competition

- Type: National championship
- Date: December 21 – 24, 2023
- Season: 2023-24
- Location: Chengde, Hebei
- Host: Chinese Skating Association

Defending champions
- Men's singles: Chen Yudong
- Ladies' singles: An Xiangyi
- Pairs: Zhang Siyang / Yang Yongchao
- Ice dance: Chen Xizi / Xing Jianing

Champions
- Men's singles: Chen Yudong
- Ladies' singles: Wang Yihan
- Pairs: Peng Cheng / Wang Lei
- Ice dance: Chen Xizi / Xing Jianing
- Previous: 2022 Chinese Championships
- Next: 2024 Chinese Championships

2023 Chinese Figure Skating Championships (Chinese: 2023年中国全国花样滑冰锦标赛) or officially the 2023-24 season Chinese Figure Skating Championships (Chinese: 2023/2024年度中国全国花样滑冰锦标赛) were held from December 21-24, 2023 in Hebei, China. Medals were awarded in men's singles, women's singles, pair skating, and ice dance. The results served as the qualifying event of the national winter games as well as the 2024 Four Continents Figure Skating Championships. The novice and junior championships were held on November 20-23 and November 24-26 respectively.

== Entries ==
On December 15, 2023, the broadcaster of the championships announced the list of entries.

=== Senior ===
Men	Women	Pairs	Ice dance
Chen Peitong	~~An Xiangyi~~ (withdrew)	Guo Rui / Zhang Yiwen	Cao Luchang / Chen Jianxu
Chen Yudong	Ariel Guo	Jia Ye / Zhang Tianyang	Chen Xizi / Xing Jianing
Dai Daiwei	Chen Hongyi	Luan Hanyue / Ge Zichen	Kangran / Zou Hanyun
Dong Yinbo	Cheng Jiaying	Peng Cheng / Wang Lei	Lu Yu / Zhang Chenhang
Gao Jian	Ding Yixuan	Shi Wenning / Wang Zhiyu	Meng Bolin / Zhang Meihong
Gong Zheng	Fang Jiaqi	Sun Youmei / Li Zeen	Meng Lingxuan / Chen Lang
Han Wenbao	Gao Shiqi	Wang Yuchen / Zhu Lei	Shao Xinran / Li Junting
Jiang Zhiao	Geng Guanxu	Wang Yunjie / Liu Helin	Shi Shang / Wu Nan
Lang Junxiao	Huang Can	Yang Yixi / Deng Shunyang	Wang Yutong / Wang Pintian
Leung Kwun Hong	Jin Guanru	Zhang Jiaxuan / Huang Yihang	Xiao Zixi / He Linghao
Li Jiarui	Jin Hengxin	Zhang Siyang / Yang Yongchao	Yin Xiuya / Ji Zhouhao
Li Mingda	Jin Shuxian	Zhang Xuanqi / Fengwen Qiang	Yu Xinyi / Liu Tianyi
Li Pengrui	Joanna So	Zhang Yiqing / Chen Yongzheng	
Li Zhuolang	~~Li Ruotang~~ (withdrew)		
Liu Mutong	Li Yinxi		
Ma Zichen	Li Yuhan		
Meg Ruiqi	Liu Xuanyu		
Peng Zhiming	Liu Yuxuan		
Qu Zhibo	Mo Tong		
Sun Yihe	Pan Ruoran		
Wang Kunze	Pang Qingyu		
Wang Zexin	Shi Jiaxin		
Wang Ziyu	Sun Wanyi		
Wayne Chung	Wang Yihan		
Xu Juwen	Wang Yihan		
Yu Zhile	Wang Yuyun		
Yuen Lap Kan	Wen Yiyun		
Zhang He	Xing Yumei		
Zhang Ruiyang	Xu Wandi		
Zhao Guangye	Zhang Mengqi		
Zhao Hanyu	Zhang Muhan		
Zhao Hueng Lai Jacky	Zhang Ruiyang		
	Zhang Yixuan		
	Zheng Yuqiao		
	Zhou Xuhan		
	Zhu Yi		

== Timetable ==
The official training and competition timetable is published on 10 December.

Date	Discipline	Time	Segment
22 December	Ice dance	12:00	Rhythm dance
22 December	Women	14:15	Short program
22 December	Synchronized	20:35	Short program
23 December	Pairs	11:00	Short program
23 December	Men	13:25	Short program
23 December	Ice dance	18:35	Free dance
23 December	Synchronized	20:50	Free skate
24 December	Men	12:00	Free skate
24 December	Pairs	16:05	Free skate
24 December	Women	18:45	Free skate
All times are listed in China time (UTC+08:00)

== Results ==
=== Men ===
Ranking	Skater	Total	SP		FS	
1	Chen Yudong	220.06	1	79.03	1	141.03
2	Dai Daiwei	212.84	2	74.73	2	138.11
3	Han Wenbao	208.00	4	70.10	3	137.90
4	Xu Juwen	188.92	5	67.28	5	121.64
5	Jiang Zhiao	182.63	8	56.34	4	126.29
6	Zhang He	189.98	3	71.13	8	109.85
7	Li Jiarui	175.22	12	54.32	6	120.90
8	Meige Ruiqi	169.43	6	61.82	9	107.61
9	Liu Mutong	165.17	10	54.71	7	110.46
10	Peng Zhiming	163.26	7	56.71	10	106.55
11	Li Zhuolang	160.91	9	56.33	12	104.58
12	Qu Zhibo	160.37	13	54.19	11	107.18
13	Zhao Hanyu	155.59	16	53.27	14	102.32
14	Wang Zexin	154.12	20	50.67	13	103.43
15	Dong Yinbo	151.27	23	50.09	15	101.18
16	Gao Jian	150.01	18	51.13	16	98.88
17	Yuen Lap Kan Lincoln	148.97	11	54.39	17	94.58
18	Lang Junxiao	146.84	19	50.83	18	96.01
19	Zhao Heung lai	145.90	14	53.81	20	92.09
20	Zhang Ruiyang	144.11	17	52.62	19	91.49
21	Li Pengrui	140.03	22	50.13	21	89.90
22	Zhao Guangye	139.43	15	53.36	22	86.07
23	Cheng Peitong	132.86	21	50.53	23	82.34
24	Li Mingda	126.64	24	48.65	24	78.59
Did not advance to free skating
25	Ma Zichen	48.38	25	48.38	—	
26	Chung Wing Yin Wayne	42.99	26	42.99	—	
27	Yu Zhile	41.56	27	41.56	—	
28	Leung Kwun Hung	41.06	28	41.06	—	
29	Wang Ziyu	38.51	29	38.51	—	

=== Women ===
Ranking	Skater	Total	SP		FS	
1	Wang Yihan	188.59	1	63.61	2	124.98
2	Jin Shuxian	176.28	10	51.20	1	125.08
3	Gao Shiqi	175.81	3	57.43	2	118.38
4	Wang Yihan	167.10	7	51.63	3	115.47
5	Xu Wandi	163.09	8	51.45	4	111.64
6	Liu Yuxuan	161.95	4	55.81	6	106.14
7	Zhang Ruiyang	165.80	2	59.74	5	106.06
8	Geng Wantong	154.54	6	52.66	9	101.88
9	Zhang Mengqi	155.33	15	48.31	7	107.02
10	Chen Hongyi	146.71	9	51.44	10	95.27
11	Zhang Muhan	144.88	5	53.57	13	91.31
12	Fang Jiaqi	142.73	16	47.80	11	94.93
13	Liu Xuanyu	140.47	11	50.24	15	90.23
14	Li Lutong	140.42	14	40.38	14	91.04
15	Cheng Jiaying	138.82	17	46.79	12	92.03
16	Shi Jianxin	136.58	12	49.49	16	87.09
17	Li Yinxi	132.86	20	46.21	17	86.65
18	Zhu Yi	131.53	18	46.72	18	84.81
19	Zheng Yuqiao	125.52	21	43.22	19	82.30
20	Ding Yixuan	123.38	19	46.22	20	77.06
21	Joanna So	120.80	13	49.47	22	71.33
22	Huang Can	117.76	22	42.94	21	74.82
23	Mo Tong	109.72	23	42.64	23	67.08
24	Pan Ruoran	107.26	24	41.67	24	65.59
Did not advance to free skating
25	Wang Xizi	41.42	25	41.42	—	
26	Sun Wanyi	41.41	26	41.41	—	
27	Li Yuhan	41.39	27	41.39	—	
28	Pang Qingyu	41.12	28	41.12	—	
29	Zhou Xuhan	41.07	29	41.07	—	
30	Jin Hengxin	40.04	30	40.04	—	
31	Jin Guanru	38.81	31	38.81	—	
32	Xing Yuxuan	35.93	32	35.93	—	

=== Pairs ===
Ranking	Skater	Total	SP		FS	
1	Peng Cheng / Wang Lei	185.30	1	66.66	1	118.64
2	Zhang Jiaxuan / Huang Yihang	169.11	2	62.73	3	106.38
3	Zhang Siyang / Yang Yongchao	168.37	3	60.48	2	107.89
4	Sun Youmei / Li Zeen	153.27	6	48.47	4	104.80
5	Yang Yixi / Deng Shunyang	146.18	4	50.32	5	95.86
6	Guo Rui / Zhang Yiwen	147.79	5	49.72	6	98.07
7	Zhang Xuanqi / Feng Wenqiang	142.36	7	47.47	7	94.89
8	Wang Yunjie / Liu Helin	117.70	8	40.15	8	77.55
9	Shi Wenning / Wang Zhiyu	111.51	9	39.17	10	71.80
10	Zhang Yiqing / Chen Yongzheng	107.22	11	32.21	9	75.01
11	Luan Hanyue / Ge Zichen	98.70	10	33.44	11	65.26
12	Jia Ye / Zhang Tianyang	88.50	12	31.40	12	57.10

=== Ice dance ===
Ranking	Skater	Total	RD		FD	
1	Chen Xizi / Xing Jianing	165.60	1	67.96	1	97.64
2	Shi Shang / Wu Nan	160.02	2	63.50	2	96.52
3	Xiao Zixi / He Linghao	149.89	3	56.43	3	93.46
4	Yu Xinyi / Liu Tianyi	142.72	4	55.11	5	87.61
7	Zhang Meihong / Meng Bolin	138.63	7	50.81	4	87.82
5	Meng Lingxuan / Chen Lang	134.71	5	54.06	8	80.65
6	Kang Ran / Zou Hanyun	133.53	6	53.45	7	81.08
8	Cao Luchang / Chen Jianxu	130.85	8	47.04	6	83.81
10	Lu Yu / Zhang Chenhang	123.52	10	46.04	9	77.48
9	Li Xiaoxi / Wang Yueyang	120.95	9	47.04	10	73.91
11	Yin Xiuya / Ji Zhouhao	112.58	11	44.07	12	68.97
12	Shao Xinran / Li Junting	109.07	12	40.10	11	68.51
13	Wang Yutong / Wang Pintian	90.51	13	34.98	13	55.53

=== Synchronized skating ===
Ranking	Skater	Total	SP		FS	
1	Young Dream	156.90	1	53.25	1	103.65
2	冰舞陽光	134.27	4	40.85	2	93.42
3	Moon Child	129.51	3	43.75	3	85.76
4	STORM	122.67	2	43.95	5	78.72
5	ICE QUEEN	118.69	5	39.82	4	78.87
6	全明星夢之隊	105.96	6	35.02	6	70.94
7	啟迪璀璨隊列滑成年隊	96.10	7	32.16	7	63.94

== Medalists ==
=== Senior level ===
Discipline	Gold	Silver	Bronze
Men	Chen Yudong	Dai Daiwei	Han Wenbao
Women	Wang Yihan	Jin Shuxian	Gao Shiqi
Pairs	Peng Cheng/Wang Lei	Zhang Jiaxuan/Huang Yihang	Zhang Siyang/Yang Yongchao
Ice dance	Chen Xizi/Xing Jianing	Shi Shang/Wu Nan	Xiao Zixi/He Linghao

=== Junior Level ===
Main article: 2023 Chinese Junior Figure Skating Championships

Medalists:

Discipline	Gold	Silver	Bronze
Men	Tian Tonghe	Chen Yudong	Han Wenbao
Women	Gao Shiqi	Li Ruotang	Wang Yihan
Ice dance	Lin Yufei/Gao Zijian	Li Xuantong/Wang Xinkang	Liu Tong/Ge Quanshuo
