= Figure skating at the 14th Chinese National Winter Games =

Figure skating competition

Figure skating at the 14th Chinese National Winter Games 第十四届全国冬季运动会花样滑冰比赛
- Type: National championship
- Date: February 17 – 27
- Season: 2023-24
- Location: Hulunbuir, Inner Mongolia, China
- Host: Chinese Skating Association
- Venue: Inner Mongolia Winter sports training centre

Champions
- Men's singles: Jin Boyang (Senior); Chen Yudong (Junior)
- Ladies' singles: Jin Shuxian (Senior); Wang Yihan (Junior)
- Pairs: Peng Cheng/Wang Lei
- Ice dance: Wang Shiyue / Liu Xinyu (Senior); Li Xuantong/Wang Xinkang (Junior)
- Previous: Xinjiang 2016
- Next: Liaoning 2028

Figure skating at the 14th Chinese National Winter Games is the figure skating event at the 14th Chinese National Winter Games held in Hulunbuir. Competitors would need to qualify for the games through earning points at the third and fifth leg of the domestic grand prix, national championships or at the GP/JGP. The winter games will also serve as a qualifying event or one of the qualifying criterion for the 2024 World Figure Skating Championships.

== Qualifying entry criterion ==
On July 10, 2023, the General Office of the General Administration of Sports issued a notice on competition regulations for 9 events including figure skating in the 14th National Winter Games, announcing the competition regulations for the figure skating event.

=== Points ===
Competitors will earn points at domestic and international events, and choose the best 3 competition ranking to calculate points. The three competition rankings could include 2 international events at most.

Points
Ranking	GP	JGP	GP Final	JGP Final	Natl championships(Jun)	Club league Beijing leg	Club league Hulunbuir leg
1st	600	500	840	740	350	250	250
2nd	540	450	756	656	315	225	225
3rd	486	405	680	590	284	203	203
4th	437	365	612	500	255	182	182
5th	394	328	551	480	230	164	164
6th	354	295	496	410	207	148	148
7th	319	266			186	133	133
8th	287	239			167	120	120
9th	258	215			150	108	108
10th	232	194			135	97	97
11th	209	174			122	87	87
12th	188	157			111	78	78
13th					102	68	68
14th					95	59	59
15th					90	50	50
16th					83	42	42
17th					73	34	34
18th					63	27	27
19th					55	24	24
20th					48	19	19
21st					41	16	16
22nd					35	13	13
23rd					29	10	10
24th					24	8	8

=== Minimum TES Score ===
Apart from earning points, competitors would also need to meet the MTS in any domestic or international events.

MTS
Discipline	Short program/Rhythm dance	Free program/Free dance
Men (Junior)	17（13）	30（25）
Women (Junior)	17（13）	30（25）
Pairs (Junior)	15（12）	26（22）
Ice dancing (Junior)	17（12）	27（22）

== Timetable ==
On 8 December 2023, CFSA announced the timetable for juniors event.

On 8 January 2024, CFSA announced the timetable for seniors event.

Jr/Sr	Date	Discipline	Time	Segment
Junior	18 January, 2024	Ice dance	13:45	Rhythm dance
Junior	18 January, 2024	Men	15:10	Short program
Junior	18 January, 2024	Women	18:00	Short program
Junior	19 January, 2024	Ice dance	14:00	Free dance
Junior	19 January, 2024	Men	15:30	Free skate
Junior	19 January, 2024	Women	18:35	Free skate
Senior	21 February, 2024	Team event - Ice dance	14:30	Rhythm dance
Senior	21 February, 2024	Team event - Men	15:55	Short program
Senior	21 February, 2024	Team event - Pairs	17:20	Short program
Senior	21 February, 2024	Team event - Women	18:30	Short program
Senior	22 February, 2024	Team event - Ice dance	14:00	Free dance
Senior	22 February, 2024	Team event - Men	15:05	Free skate
Senior	22 February, 2024	Team event - Pairs	16:10	Free skate
Senior	22 February, 2024	Team event - Women	17:20	Free skate
Senior	24 February, 2024	Ice dance	14:30	Rhythm dance
Senior	24 February, 2024	Pairs	16:05	Short program
Senior	24 February, 2024	Women	18:05	Short program
Senior	25 February, 2024	Men	14:00	Short program
Senior	25 February, 2024	Pairs	17:05	Free skate
Senior	25 February, 2024	Women	19:15	Free skate
Senior	26 February, 2024	Ice dance	14:00	Free skate
Senior	26 February, 2024	Men	15:50	Free skate
Senior	27 February, 2024	Gala		

== Entries ==
=== Senior-level ===
Representing region	Men's single	Women's single	Pairs skating	Ice dancing
Beijing	Jin Boyang; Chen Peitong	Tong Ruichen; An Xiangyi; Zhang Ruiyang; Wang Xizi; Li Yinxi	Peng Cheng/Wang Lei	Wang Shiyue/Liu Xinyu
Bingzhimeng (Beijing) Sports Culture Development Co. Ltd.	Li Jiarui	Fang Jiaqi		
Beijing Dance Academy				Meng Lingxuan/Chen Lang
Tianjin	Qu Zhibo		Zhang Jiaxuan/Huang Yihang	Cao Luchang/Chen Jianxu
Heilongjiang	Han Wenbao	Zhu Yi	Zhang Siyang/Yang Yongchao	Chen Xizi/Xing Jianing
Jilin	Zhang He; Li Zhuolang; Liu Mutong	Zhang Mengqi	Wang Yuchen/Zhu Lei	Yu Xinyi/Liu Tianyi
Shanxi	Jiang Zhiao; Wang Zexin	Wang Yihan		Zhang Meihong/Meng Bolin
Sichuan	Xu Juwen; Zhao Hanyu	Jin Shuxian; Li Lutong; Geng Wantong; Ding Yixuan	Shi Wenning/Wang Zhiyu; Wang Yunjie/Liu Helin	Shi Shang/Wu Nan
Shanghai	Mege Ruiqi			
Hebei			Sun Youyou/Li Ze'en	
Hubei	Gao Jian		Zhang Xuanqi/Feng Wenqiang	
Guangdong	Dai Daiwei; Peng Zhiming	Cheng Jiaying; Liu Yuxuan	Guo Rui/Zhang Yiwen	Xiao Zixi/He Linghao
Guangxi			Yang Yixi/Deng Shunyang	
Inner Mongolia		Chen Hongyi		
Zhejiang				Lu Yu/Zhang Chenhang
Hong Kong	Yuen Lap Kan Lincoln; Zhao Heung Lai	Ariel Guo; Joanna So		Kang Ran/Zou Hanyun
Macau	Ho Chi Hin (wild card)	Wong Dung Yau (wild card)		

=== Junior-level ===
On 22 December 2023, CFSA announced entries to the 14th Chinese National Winter Games junior event.

Representing region	Men's single	Women's single	Ice dancing
Beijing	Zhao Qihan; Guo Yingchun; Liu Yuchen; Chen Yudong; Sun Zhunhe	Xu Wandi; Yang Ziyue; Wang Yihan; Li Ruotang; Wen Yiyun; Gao Shiqi; Hu Feijun	Li Xuantong/Wang Xinkang; Ding Xinai/Zheng Hanchong
Guangdong		Zhou Zijun	
Hebei			Yin Shanjie/Yang Shirui
Heilongjiang	Li Yingrui; Wang Bofeng; Wang Zexuan; Dong Yinbo; Yang Jingtong	Zhu Yaxuan	Qu Xintong/Liu Zhihong
Hong Kong	Simon Sun; Chow Chitwang	Chan Tsz Ching Cherrie; Chloe Desiree Leung; Megan Wong	
Jilin	Tian Tonghe	Shi Jiaxin; Yang Xiyao	Lin Yufei/Gao Zijian
Liaoning	Lu Boren	Liu Xinyao	
Macau		Tat Ian I Fiona (wild card)	
Shandong	Li Mingda	Liu Xuanyu	
Shanghai	Li Ziyi; Yu Zhile	Li Ziye	
Shanxi	Ren Yihan (withdrawn)		
Sichuan		Jin Hengxin	Liu Tong/Ge Quanshuo; Munir Rohman/Abdouriz Mutailip
Yunnan			Gao Yuxi/Li Suyang

== Senior team event result ==
Rank	Representing region	Men SP	Women SP	Pairs SP	Ice dance RD	Men FS	Women FS	Pairs FS	Ice dance FD	Total
1st place, gold medalist(s)	Beijing	10	10	10	10	10	10	10	10	80
2nd place, silver medalist(s)	Guangdong	9	7	6	7	9	7	8	8	61
3rd place, bronze medalist(s)	Heilongjiang	5	4	8	9	8	6	9	9	58
4	Sichuan	7	9	5	8	7	9	6	7	58
5	Jilin	4	5	7	5	6	8	7	6	48
Unable to proceed to free skating/dance
6	Tianjin	6	/	9	6	Did not advance				21
7	Shanxi	8	6	/	3	Did not advance				17
8	Hong Kong	3	8	/	4	Did not advance				15

== Senior level results ==
=== Men ===
Rank	Athlete	Representing region	Total	Short program		Free skating	
1	Jin Boyang	Beijing	267.49	1	93.60	1	173.89
2	Dai Daiwei	Guangdong	235.23	2	75.75	2	159.48
3	Han Wenbao	Heilongjiang	213.25	3	73.30	3	139.95
4	Zhang He	Jilin	199.63	9	63.05	4	136.58
5	Qu Zhibo	Tianjin	199.16	5	67.52	5	131.64
6	Jiang Zhiao	Shanxi	198.35	4	67.73	6	130.62
7	Peng Zhiming	Guangdong	193.51	6	64.85	8	128.66
8	Li Jiarui	Bingzhimeng (Beijing) Sports Culture Development Co. Ltd.	188.91	10	59.83	7	129.11
9	Liu Mutong	Jilin	185.77	8	63.07	10	122.70
10	Xu Juwen	Sichuan	178.47	7	63.64	13	114.83
11	Mege Ruiqi	Shanghai	182.27	13	58.42	9	123.85
12	Chen Peitong	Beijing	178.60	14	58.08	11	120.52
13	Wang Zexin	Shanxi	171.16	16	54.64	12	116.52
14	Gao Jian	Hubei	166.05	15	54.94	14	111.11
15	Zhao Heung Lai	Hong Kong	165.33	11	59.68	15	105.65
16	Li Zhuolang	Jilin	156.27	12	58.80	17	97.47
17	Yuen Lap Kan Lincoln	Hong Kong	136.74	17	49.80	18	86.94
18	Zhao Hanyu	Sichuan	134.29	18	36.70	16	97.59
19	Ho Chi Hin	Macao	51.76	19	18.36	19	33.40

=== Women ===
Rank	Athlete	Representing region	Total	Short program		Free skating	
1	Jin Shuxian	Sichuan	185.27	2	62.70	1	122.57
2	An Xiangyi	Beijing	181.77	1	65.52	3	116.25
3	Zhang Mengqi	Jilin	176.52	5	55.64	2	120.88
4	Zhang Ruiyang	Beijing	169.66	3	59.10	5	110.56
5	Wang Xizi	Beijing	166.44	4	57.18	6	109.26
6	Wang Yihan	Shanxi	163.71	7	54.52	7	109.19
7	Tong Ruichen	Beijing	163.68	11	51.43	4	112.25
8	Li Lutong	Sichuan	163.05	6	54.91	8	108.14
9	Geng Wantong	Sichuan	161.72	8	53.86	10	107.86
10	Liu Yuxuan	Guangdong	157.84	10	51.46	11	106.38
11	Fang Jiaqi	Bingzhimeng (Beijing) Sports Culture Development Co. Ltd.	154.70	13	49.53	12	105.17
12	Ariel Guo	Hong Kong	153.97	17	45.25	9	108.72
13	Zhu Yi	Heilongjiang	147.03	16	46.21	13	100.82
14	Chen Hongyi	Inner Mongolia	146.38	12	49.88	14	96.50
15	Joanna So	Hong Kong	143.53	9	53.16	15	90.37
16	Ding Yixuan	Sichuan	124.97	15	46.54	16	78.43
17	Cheng Jiaying	Guangdong	121.80	14	48.85	17	72.95
18	Li Yinxi	Beijing	115.61	18	43.12	18	72.49
19	Wong Dung Yau	Macao	41.05	19	15.11	19	25.94

=== Pairs ===
Rank	Athlete	Representing region	Total	Short program		Free skating	
1	Peng Cheng/Wang Lei	Beijing	198.39	1	71.77	2	126.62
2	Zhang Jiaxuan/Huang Yihang	Tianjin	192.88	3	65.90	1	126.98
3	Zhang Siyang/Yang Yongchao	Heilongjiang	174.72	2	66.15	3	108.57
4	Yang Yixi/Deng Shunyang	Guangxi	160.15	4	54.17	4	105.98
5	Guo Rui/Zhang Yiwen	Guangdong	151.97	7	49.19	5	102.78
6	Sun Youyou/Li Ze'en	Hebei	150.85	6	50.96	7	99.89
7	Wang Yuchen/Zhu Lei	Jilin	150.40	5	52.83	8	97.57
8	Zhang Xuanqi/Feng Wenqiang	Hubei	147.53	8	45.58	6	101.95
9	Wang Yunjie/Liu Helin	Sichuan	131.9	9	41.83	9	90.07
10	Shi Wenning/Wang Zhiyu	Sichuan	Withdrawn				

=== Ice dance ===
Rank	Athlete	Representing region	Total	Rhythm dance		Free dance	
1	Wang Shiyue/Liu Xinyu	Beijing	191.71	1	78.17	1	113.54
2	Chen Xizi/Xing Jianing	Heilongjiang	182.66	2	73.37	2	109.29
3	Xiao Zixi/He Linghao	Guangdong	175.27	3	68.12	3	107.15
4	Shi Shang/Wu Nan	Sichuan	166.60	4	64.76	4	101.84
5	Yu Xinyi/Liu Tianyi	Jilin	162.25	5	63.72	5	98.53
6	Zhang Meihong/Meng Bolin	Shanxi	146.49	6	53.35	6	93.14
7	Cao Luchang/Chen Jianxu	Tianjin	140.20	8	50.90	7	89.30
8	Meng Lingxuan/Chen Lang	Beijing Dance Academy	133.70	7	53.25	9	80.45
9	Kang Ran/Zou Hanyun	Hong Kong	131.91	10	47.53	8	84.38
10	Lu Yu/Zhang Chenhang	Zhejiang	121.97	9	48.80	10	73.17

== Junior level results ==
=== Men's single ===
Rank	Athlete	Representing region	Total	Short program		Free skating	
1	Chen Yudong	Beijing	212.98	1	68.08	1	144.90
2	Tian Tonghe	Jilin	178.30	2	61.58	2	116.72
3	Zhao Qihan	Beijing	164.40	6	50.92	3	113.48
4	Wang Zexuan	Heilongjiang	163.74	3	58.46	4	105.28
5	Li Yingrui	Heilongjiang	163.52	4	54.55	5	108.97
6	Sun Zhunhe	Beijing	159.59	5	52.89	6	106.70
7	Yu Zhile	Shanghai	152.18	7	50.72	8	101.46
8	Li Ziyi	Shanghai	149.65	10	47.65	7	102.00
9	Dong Yinbo	Heilongjiang	146.48	8	50.52	9	95.96
10	Lu Boren	Liaoning	137.09	9	48.20	12	88.89
11	Yang Jingtong	Heilongjiang	136.06	12	46.40	11	89.66
12	Chow Chitwang	Hong Kong	133.97	11	46.55	13	87.42
13	Wang Bofeng	Heilongjiang	131.46	16	41.05	10	90.41
14	Liu Yuchen	Beijing	124.58	15	41.93	15	82.65
15	Li Mingda	Shandong	124.31	17	39.69	14	84.62
16	Guo Yingchun	Beijing	116.68	14	42.16	16	74.52
17	Simon Sun	Hong Kong	115.21	13	42.17	17	73.04
18	Ren Yihan	Shanxi	withdrawn from competition				

=== Women's single ===
Rank	Athlete	Representing region	Total	Short program		Free skating	
1	Wang Yihan	Beijing	192.77	1	64.16	1	128.61
2	Gao Shiqi	Beijing	185.59	2	64.12	2	121.47
3	Li Ruotang	Beijing	160.84	4	50.93	3	109.91
4	Xu Wandi	Beijing	151.59	3	54.32	4	97.27
5	Zhou Zijun	Guangdong	143.72	5	50.87	8	92.85
6	Liu Xuanyu	Shandong	143.16	6	49.43	6	93.73
9	Shi Jiaxin	Jilin	142.02	9	47.81	5	94.21
7	Jin Hengxin	Sichuan	141.68	7	48.79	7	92.89
8	Wen Yiyun	Beijing	140.53	8	48.71	10	91.82
11	Megan Wong	Hong Kong	138.99	11	46.49	9	92.50
10	Liu Xinyao	Liaoning	135.40	10	46.61	11	88.79
12	Chloe Desiree Leung	Hong Kong	120.10	17	36.52	12	83.58
13	Chan Tsz Ching Cherrie	Hong Kong	119.03	15	38.44	13	80.59
14	Hu Feijun	Beijing	118.78	13	40.47	14	78.31
15	Li Ziye	Shanghai	114.33	14	39.19	15	75.14
16	Zhu Yaxuan	Heilongjiang	107.96	18	35.24	16	72.72
17	Yang Xiyao	Jilin	103.91	12	41.27	18	62.64
18	Yang Ziyue	Beijing	100.58	16	36.74	17	63.84
19	Tat Ian I Fiona	Macau	43.13	19	14.16	19	28.97

=== Ice dance ===
Rank	Athlete	Representing region	Total	Rhythm dance		Free dance	
1	Li Xuantong/Wang Xinkang	Beijing	159.48	1	62.75	1	96.73
2	Lin Yufei/Gao Zijian	Jilin	157.91	2	61.96	2	95.95
3	Liu Tong/Ge Quanshuo	Sichuan	132.67	3	53.32	3	79.35
4	Yin Shanjie/Yang Shirui	Hebei	132.14	4	53.04	4	79.10
5	Ding Xinai/Zheng Hanchong	Beijing	129.83	5	52.48	5	77.35
6	Gao Yuxi/Li Suyang	Yunnan	115.29	6	44.76	6	70.53
7	Munir Rohman/Abdouriz Mutailip	Sichuan	110.53	7	42.45	7	68.08
8	Qu Xintong/Liu Zhihong	Heilongjiang	108.84	8	41.94	8	66.90

== Qualifications: 2024 World Championships ==
	Men's single	Pairs	Ice dance
1	Jin Boyang	Peng Cheng/Wang Lei	Chen Xizi/Xing Jianing
1st alt.		Zhang Siyang/Yang Yongchao	Wang Shiyue/Liu Xinyu
