= Zheng Xun =

Chinese ice dancer

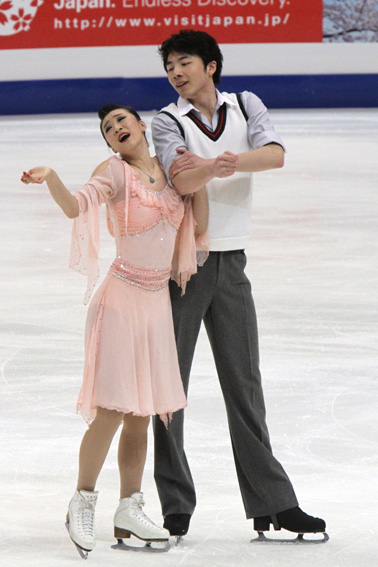
- Huang/Zheng in 2011.

Personal information
- Full name: 郑汛
- Born: August 21, 1987 (age 39) Harbin, Heilongjiang
- Height: 1.88 m (6 ft 2 in)

Figure skating career
- Country: China
- Partner: Zhao Yue
- Coach: Xi Hongyan
- Skating club: Harbin FSC
- Retired: January 28, 2016

Zheng Xun (simplified Chinese: 郑汛; traditional Chinese: 鄭汛; pinyin: Zhèng Xùn; born August 21, 1987) is a Chinese former competitive ice dancer and current ice dancing coach. With partner Huang Xintong, he is the 2011 Asian Winter Games champion and a five-time Chinese national champion (2007, 2009, 2011, 2012, and 2014). Their best result at the World Championships was 12th in 2012. In spring 2014, he partnered with Zhao Yue.

== Programs ==
Season	Short dance	Free dance	Exhibition
2013–2014	Quickstep: Sing, Sing, Sing by Benny Goodman; Foxtrot: I Will Wait for You; Quickstep: Sing, Sing, Sing by Benny Goodman	The Nutcracker by Pyotr I. Tchaikovsky: Dance of the Sugarplum Fairy; Waltz of the Flowers; Pas de Deux – Intrada; Final Waltz and Apotheosis	My Heart Will Go On by Celine Dion
2012–2013	Polka; Waltz	L-O-V-E by Michael Bublé; At Last by Beyoncé; Crazy Love by Michael Bublé	My Heart Will Go On by Celine Dion
2011–2012	Mambo; Rumba; Samba	Libertango by Astor Piazzolla; Sentimientos by Andrés Linetzky, Ernesto Romeo	If I Ain't Got You by Alicia Keys
2010–2011	Waltz: Waltz No.2 by Dmitri Shostakovich	Singin' in the Rain by Nacio Herb Brown	就算没有明天 by Huang Xiaoming and Sun Li
	Original dance		
2009–2010	Greek folk: Zorba the Greek	Adagio in G minor by Remo Giazotto, Tomaso Albinoni	
2008–2009	Blues: Minnie the Moocher by Cab Calloway; Swing: by Big Bad Voodoo Daddy	Spente le Stelle by Emma Shapplin; Notre-Dame de Paris by Riccardo Cocciante	
2007–2008	Russian folk: Kalinka	Spente le Stelle by Emma Shapplin	
2006–2007	Argentine tango: Vuelvo Al Sur by Gotan Project, Philippe Solal	Harem performed by Sarah Brightman	
2005–2006	Cha Cha; Rhumba; Samba	Carmina Burana (modern arrangement) by Carl Orff	
2004–2005	Quickstep: You do Something to Me by Jim Reeves; Slow foxtrot: Close to You by Perry Como; Quickstep: Life Goes to a Party by Dionne Warwick	Parisian Tango by Mireille Mathieu; Once You Hold Gold by Richard Chamberlain; Parisian Tango by Mireille Mathieu	
2003–2004	Jive; Blues; Jive	Music by Dave Matthews	

== Competitive highlights ==
=== With Zhao ===
Results
International
Event	2014–15	2015–16
Four Continents	10th	
GP Cup of China	8th	5th
National
Chinese Champ.	2nd	1st

=== With Zheng ===
Results
International
Event	2000–01	2001–02	2002–03	2003–04	2004–05	2005–06	2006–07	2007–08	2008–09	2009–10	2010–11	2011–12	2012–13	2013–14
Olympics										19th				23rd
Worlds							21st		22nd		17th	12th		
Four Continents						10th	8th	9th	7th	4th	6th			
GP Bompard							11th				5th	6th		
GP Cup of China							10th	7th	9th	7th	5th	5th	7th	
GP NHK Trophy								10th		5th			7th	
Nebelhorn										5th				
Asian Games							2nd				1st			
Universiade							5th		7th					
International: Junior
Junior Worlds				19th	14th	11th								
JGP China			12th		5th									
JGP Czech Rep.				9th										
JGP Germany					6th									
JGP Japan						5th								
JGP Romania						9th								
JGP Slovenia				11th										
National
Chinese Champ.	5th	4th	5th	3rd	4th	2nd	1st		1st	2nd	1st	1st		1st
Team events
Olympics														7th T 10th P
GP = Grand Prix; JGP = Junior Grand Prix; T = Team result; P = Personal result

== Coaching career ==
As of March 2023, Zheng Xun coaches the following pairs:

- Chen Xizi / Xing Jianing
- Li Xuantong / Wang Xinkang
- Tong Liu/ Quanshuo Ge
