= 2024 Cup of China =

Figure skating competition

- Type: Grand Prix
- Date: November 22 – 24
- Season: 2024–25
- Location: Chongqing, China
- Host: Chinese Skating Association
- Venue: Chongqing Huaxi Culture and Sports Center

Champions
- Men's singles: (Japan) Shun Sato
- Women's singles: (United States) Amber Glenn
- Pairs: (Italy) Sara Conti and Niccolò Macii
- Ice dance: (Italy) Charlène Guignard and Marco Fabbri
- Previous: 2023 Cup of China
- Next: 2025 Cup of China
- Previous Grand Prix: 2024 Finlandia Trophy
- Next Grand Prix: 2024–25 Grand Prix Final

The 2024 Cup of China was the sixth event of the 2024–25 ISU Grand Prix of Figure Skating: a senior-level international invitational competition series. It was held at the Chongqing Huaxi Culture and Sports Center in Chongqing from November 22–24. Medals were awarded in men's singles, women's singles, pair skating, and ice dance. Skaters also earned points toward qualifying for the 2024–25 Grand Prix Final.

== Background ==
The ISU Grand Prix of Figure Skating is a series of seven events sanctioned by the International Skating Union (ISU) and held during the autumn: six qualifying events and the Grand Prix of Figure Skating Final. This allows skaters to perfect their programs earlier in the season, as well as compete against the same skaters whom they would later encounter at the World Championships. Skaters earn points based on their results in their respective competitions and after the six qualifying events, the top skaters or teams in each discipline are invited to compete at the Grand Prix Final. The Cup of China debuted as a Grand Prix event in 2003 as a replacement for the Bofrost Cup on Ice. The Cup of China has been interrupted three times in its history: in 2018 when the Chinese Skating Association elected to forgo hosting any international skating events in order to prepare its venues for the 2022 Winter Olympics, and then in 2021 and 2022 due to the COVID-19 pandemic. The Cup of China has been held in Chongqing since 2019.

== Changes to preliminary assignments ==
The International Skating Union announced the preliminary assignments on June 9, 2024.

Discipline	Withdrew		Added		Notes	Ref.
Discipline	Date	Skater(s)	Date	Skater(s)	Notes	Ref.
Women	August 5	(United States); Ava Marie Ziegler	August 9	(South Korea); Kim Min-chae	Injury	
Men	—		August 14	(China); Dai Daiwei	Host picks	
Women	—		August 14	(China); An Xiangyi	Host picks	
Women	—		August 14	(China); Zhu Yi	Host picks	
Pairs	—		August 14	(China); Yang Yixi; Deng Shunyang	Host picks	
Pairs	—		August 14	(China); Zhang Siyang; Jia Ziqi	Host picks	
Ice dance	—		August 14	(China); Xiao Zixi; He Linghao	Host picks	
Ice dance	—		August 14	(China); Ren Junfei; Xing Jianing	Host picks	
Pairs	September 13	(China); Peng Cheng; Wang Lei	September 13	(China); Wang Yuchen; Zhu Lei		
Pairs	October 15	(United States); Valentina Plazas; Maximiliano Fernandez	October 16	(Poland); Ioulia Chtchetinina; Michał Woźniak	Injury	
Pairs	October 15	(China); Zhang Siyang; Jia Ziqi	October 16	(United States); Katie McBeath; Daniil Parkman		
Pairs	November 11	(China); Yang Yixi; Deng Shunyang	November 11	(Philippines); Isabella Gamez; Aleksandr Korovin		
Men	November 22	(Canada); Wesley Chiu	—		Medical reasons	

== Results ==
=== Men's singles ===
Men's results
Rank	Skater	Nation	Total points	SP		FS	
1st place, gold medalist(s)	Shun Sato	Japan	278.48	1	98.75	2	179.73
2nd place, silver medalist(s)	Mikhail Shaidorov	Kazakhstan	276.17	2	93.21	1	182.96
3rd place, bronze medalist(s)	Adam Siao Him Fa	France	252.53	3	91.22	3	161.31
4	Nika Egadze	Georgia	247.54	4	87.73	4	159.81
5	Matteo Rizzo	Italy	243.82	5	84.92	6	158.90
6	Dai Daiwei	China	237.35	7	82.96	7	154.39
7	Deniss Vasiļjevs	Latvia	234.67	9	75.75	5	158.92
8	Jin Boyang	China	231.89	6	83.66	9	148.23
9	Kim Hyun-gyeom	South Korea	216.64	11	67.76	8	148.88
10	Nikolaj Memola	Italy	214.77	10	68.87	10	145.90
11	Chen Yudong	China	182.60	8	77.73	11	104.87

=== Women's singles ===
Women's results
Rank	Skater	Nation	Total points	SP		FS	
1st place, gold medalist(s)	Amber Glenn	United States	215.54	2	70.84	1	144.70
2nd place, silver medalist(s)	Mone Chiba	Japan	211.91	1	70.86	2	141.05
3rd place, bronze medalist(s)	Kim Chae-yeon	South Korea	208.47	4	69.27	3	139.20
4	Rion Sumiyoshi	Japan	202.45	3	70.48	4	131.97
5	Rinka Watanabe	Japan	196.95	5	69.08	6	127.87
6	Kimmy Repond	Switzerland	195.91	6	67.71	5	128.20
7	Madeline Schizas	Canada	180.77	8	61.10	8	119.67
8	Anastasiia Gubanova	Georgia	177.34	11	52.11	7	125.23
9	Zhu Yi	China	166.04	10	58.36	9	107.68
10	An Xiangyi	China	163.74	9	60.10	10	103.64
11	Kim Min-chae	South Korea	154.39	7	62.94	12	91.45
12	Chen Hongyi	China	139.57	12	45.81	11	93.76

=== Pairs ===
Pairs' results
Rank	Team	Nation	Total points	SP		FS	
1st place, gold medalist(s)	Sara Conti; Niccolo Macii	Italy	211.05	1	72.43	2	138.62
2nd place, silver medalist(s)	Minerva Fabienne Hase; Nikita Volodin	Germany	209.36	2	68.44	1	140.92
3rd place, bronze medalist(s)	Lia Pereira; Trennt Michaud	Canada	188.74	3	66.90	3	121.84
4	Ioulia Chtchetinina; Michał Woźniak	Poland	177.04	4	61.11	5	115.93
5	Katie McBeath; Daniil Parkman	United States	159.92	8	42.67	4	117.25
6	Camille Kovalev; Pavel Kovalev	France	157.11	6	54.01	6	103.10
7	Isabella Gamez; Aleksandr Korovin	Philippines	151.26	7	50.65	7	100.61
8	Wang Yuchen; Zhu Lei	China	136.90	5	55.14	8	81.76

=== Ice dance ===
Ice dance results
Rank	Team	Nation	Total points	RD		FD	
1st place, gold medalist(s)	Charlène Guignard; Marco Fabbri	Italy	209.13	1	84.84	1	124.29
2nd place, silver medalist(s)	Marjorie Lajoie; Zachary Lagha	Canada	205.16	2	81.53	2	123.63
3rd place, bronze medalist(s)	Christina Carreira; Anthony Ponomarenko	United States	198.18	3	79.22	4	118.96
4	Olivia Smart; Tim Dieck	Spain	196.52	5	75.96	3	120.56
5	Juulia Turkkila; Matthias Versluis	Finland	192.57	4	77.80	5	114.77
6	Caroline Green; Michael Parsons	United States	189.86	6	75.63	6	114.23
7	Loïcia Demougeot; Théo le Mercier	France	185.23	7	73.50	8	111.73
8	Diana Davis; Gleb Smolkin	Georgia	182.32	8	70.53	7	111.79
9	Ren Junfei; Xing Jianing	China	156.51	9	61.64	9	94.87
10	Xiao Zixi; He Linghao	China	146.16	10	59.96	10	86.20
