= Dai Daiwei =

Russian-Chinese figure skater (born 2003)

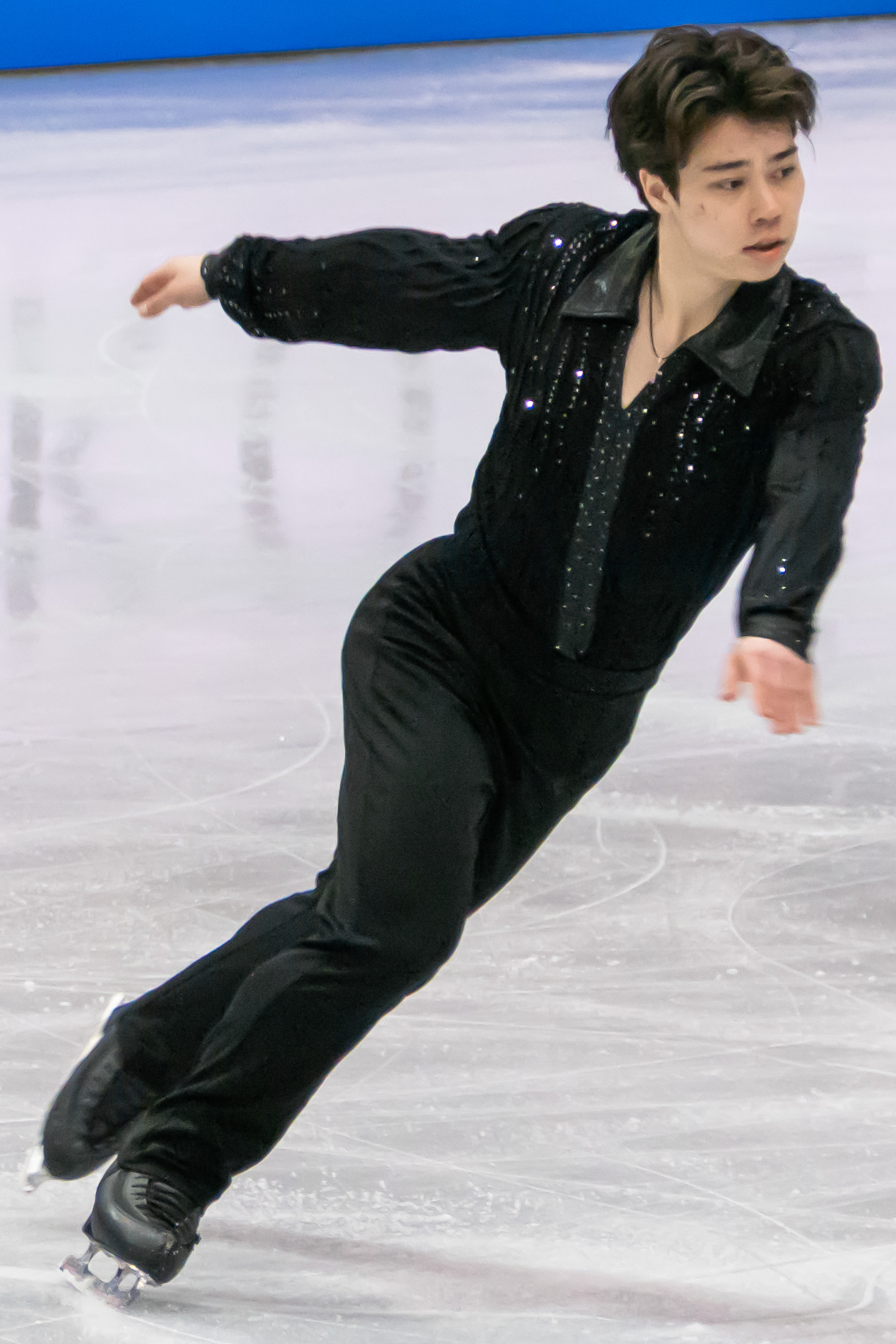
- Dai during the short program at the 2025 World Championships

Personal information
- Native name: 戴大卫
- Other names: David Dai
- Born: 19 July 2003 (age 22) St Petersburg, Russia
- Home town: Shenzhen, China
- Height: 1.70 m (5 ft 7 in)

Figure skating career
- Country: China
- Coach: Jia Shuguang; Fang Dan
- Skating club: Kunlun Red Star Shenzhen China
- Began skating: 2010

Medal record
Chinese Championships
Silver medal – second place	2024 Chengde	Singles
Silver medal – second place	2025 Chengde	Singles
Bronze medal – third place	2023 Chengde	Singles

Dai Daiwei (simplified Chinese: 戴大卫; traditional Chinese: 戴大衛; pinyin: Dài Dàiwèi; born 19 July 2003) is a Russian-born Chinese figure skater. He is a three-time Chinese national medalist and the 2023 Asian Open Trophy champion.

== Personal life ==
Dai was born on July 19, 2003 in Saint Petersburg, Russia to a Chinese father and Russian mother. The family moved to China when Dai was two years old, settling in Shenzhen. He is fluent in Mandarin, Russian, and English.

In addition to figure skating, Dai also enjoys swimming and playing piano.

He looks up to fellow Chinese male figure skaters Yan Han and Jin Boyang.

== Career ==
=== Early career ===
Dai began skating in 2010 at the age of six and a half years old, and was first coached by Denis Petrov and Chen Lu in Shenzhen. During his childhood, he also worked with former German figure skater, Constanze Paulinus, for two years, while she coached at his skating club.

Dai eventually moved to Beijing in 2018 to train under two-time World Champion pair skaters, Pang Qing and Tong Jian shortly after they opened the Pangqing Tongjian Academy.

He debuted as a junior skater at the 2020 Chinese Junior Championships, where he won the bronze medal. During the 2020–21 season, however, all Chinese national competitions were canceled as a result of the COVID-19 pandemic. This meant that Dai was unable to partake in major competitions that season.

Finally able to return to competition for the 2022–23 season, Dai made his senior national debut at the 2023 Chinese Championships, where he won the bronze medal.

In March 2023, Dai moved to Harbin to train at the Heilongjiang Winter Sports Training Center, where Jia Shuguang became his new coach.

=== 2023–2024 season ===
Making his international debut at the 2023 Asian Open Trophy, Dai won the gold medal. He went on to compete at the 2023 Shanghai Trophy, where he finished sixth. Going on to debut on the 2023–24 Grand Prix circuit, Dai finished eleventh at the 2023 Cup of China.

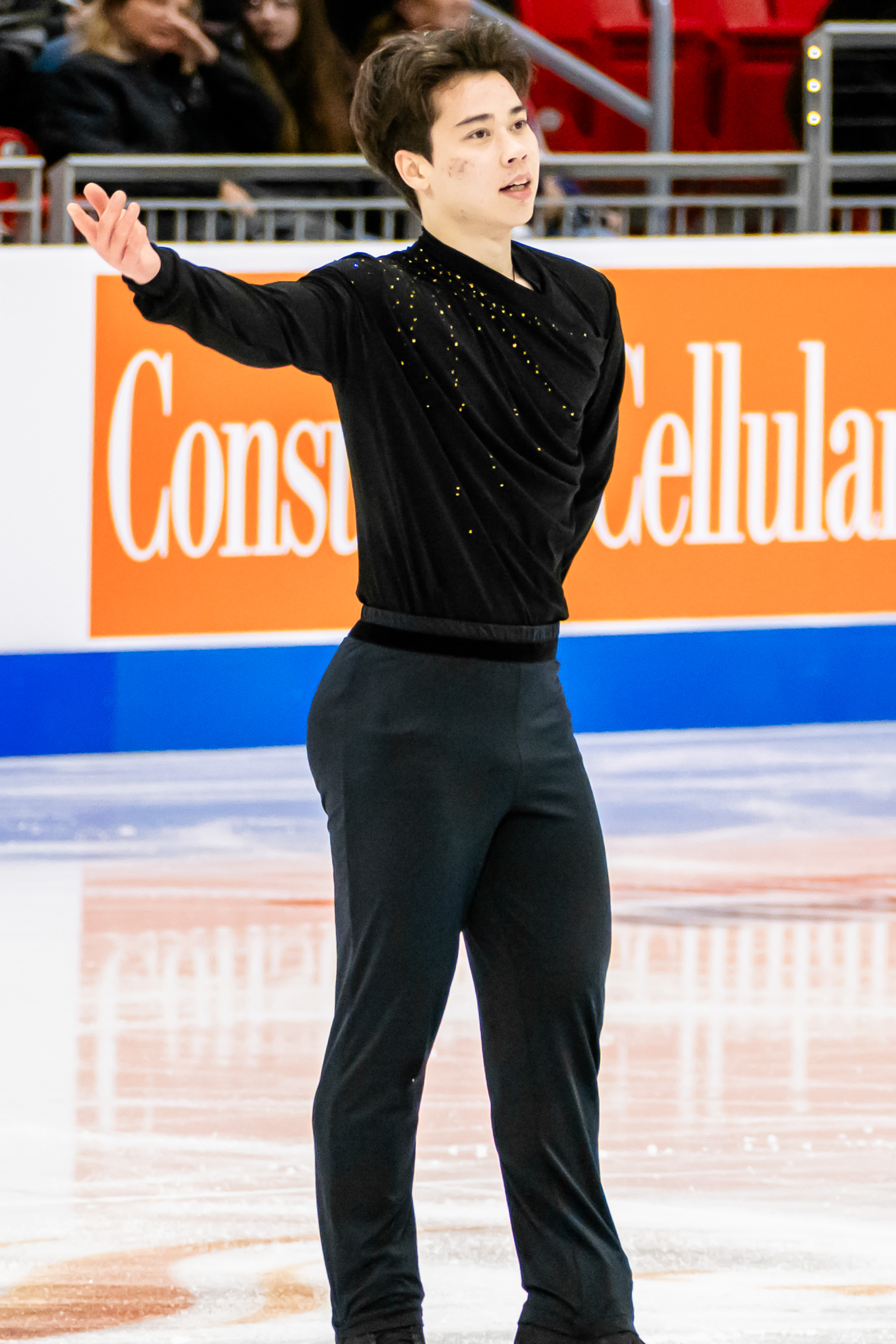
Dai performing his short program at 2025 Skate America

At the 2024 Chinese Championships, Dai won the silver medal behind Chen Yudong. Selected to compete at the 2024 Four Continents in Shanghai, Dai finished twentieth.

He closed the season by winning silver at the 2024 National Winter Games.

=== 2024–2025 season ===
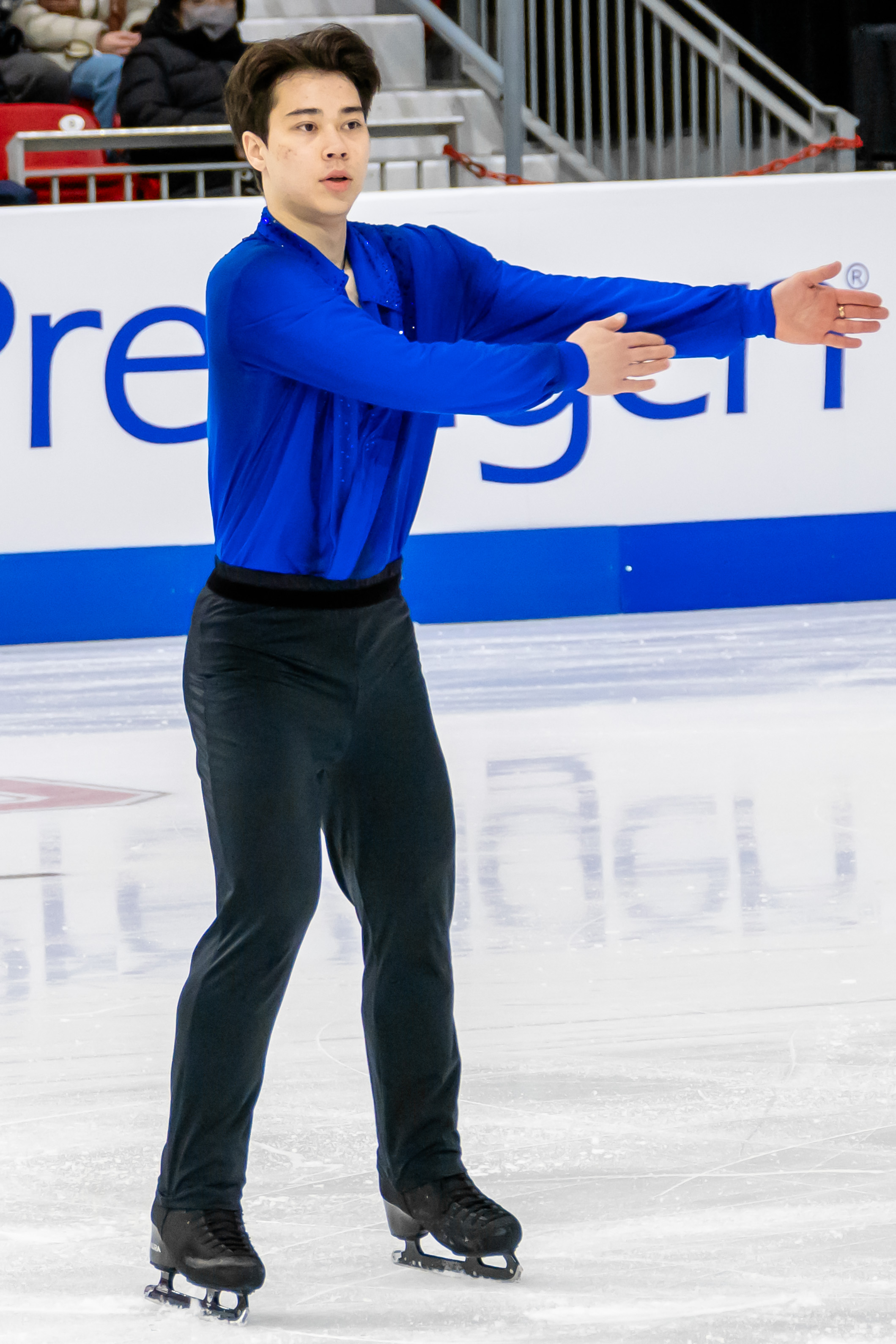
Dai performing his free skate at 2025 Skate America

Dai began the season by taking silver at the 2024 Asian Open Trophy. He then went on to compete at the 2024 Shanghai Trophy where he finished fifth. In late November, Dai competed at the 2024 Cup of China, where he placed seventh in both the short program and free skate, finishing in sixth-place overall, the highest rank of the three Chinese men competing at the event. While there, Dai would score personal bests in all three competition segments, including a short program over sixteen points higher than his previous best, a free skate over thirty-three points higher than his previous best, and a combined total score over fifty points higher than his previous best. Additionally, Dai won the silver model at the 2025 Chinese Championships (one week after the Cup of China), and set personal bests in the short program, free skate, and combined total score.

In February, Dai competed at the 2025 Asian Winter Games in Harbin, where he finished in fourth place. One week later, he placed thirteenth at the 2025 Four Continents Championships in Seoul, South Korea.

Selected to compete at the 2025 World Championships in Boston, Massachusetts, United States, Dai finished eighteenth overall. With this placement, he earned a spot for a Chinese men's singles skater to compete at the 2026 Winter Olympics.

=== 2025–2026 season ===
Dai opened the season by competing on the 2025–26 Grand Prix series, finishing eleventh at the 2025 Cup of China and at 2025 Skate America. In December, he finished fourth at the 2026 Chinese Championships.

== Programs ==
Season	Short program	Free skating	Exhibition
2025–2026	You? by Two Feet choreo. by Nikolai Moroshkin	Clouds, The Mind on the (Re)Wind by Ezio Bosso choreo. by Nikolai Moroshkin	
2024–2025	I Still Love You by Night Traveler choreo. by Elvin Wong	Tirol Concerto for Piano and Orchestra by Philip Glass choreo. by Constanze Paulinus, Jia Shuguang, Nikolai Moroshkin	Koop Island Blues by Koop
2023–2024	I Still Love You by Night Traveler choreo. by Elvin Wong; Romeo and Juliet; O Verona by Craig Armstrong, Nellee Hooper and Marius de Vries; Kissing You by Des'ree choreo. by Constanze Paulinus	You Are So Beautiful; Unchain My Heart performed by Joe Cocker choreo. by Constanze Paulinus	Breathe for Me by UNSECRET ft. Lonas

== Competitive highlights ==
- GP – Event of the ISU Grand Prix Series
- TBD – Assigned

Competition placements at senior level
Season	2022–23	2023–24	2024–25	2025–26
World Championships			18th	
Four Continents Championships		20th	13th	
Chinese Championships	3rd	2nd	2nd	4th
GP Cup of China		11th	6th	11th
GP Skate America				11th
Asian Winter Games			4th	
National Winter Games		2nd		
Shanghai Trophy		6th	5th	

Competition placements at junior level
Season	2019–20
Chinese Championships	3rd

== Detailed results ==
ISU personal best scores in the +5/-5 GOE System
Segment	Type	Score	Event
Total	TSS	237.35	2024 Cup of China
Short program	TSS	82.96	2024 Cup of China
Short program	TES	46.94	2024 Cup of China
Short program	PCS	36.02	2024 Cup of China
Free skating	TSS	154.39	2024 Cup of China
Free skating	TES	82.89	2024 Cup of China
Free skating	PCS	73.50	2024 Cup of China

Results in the 2024–25 season
Date	Event	SP		FS		Total	
Date	Event	P	Score	P	Score	P	Score
Sep 2–6, 2024	(Hong Kong) 2024 Asian Open Trophy	3	81.37	1	150.36	2	231.73
Oct 3–5, 2024	(China) 2024 Shanghai Trophy	4	78.48	5	147.19	5	225.67
Nov 22–24, 2024	2024 Cup of China	7	82.96	7	154.39	6	237.35
Nov 28 – Dec 1, 2024	(China) 2024 Chinese Championships	1	79.58	2	144.25	2	223.83
Feb 11–13, 2025	(China) 2025 Asian Winter Games	3	82.89	5	155.94	4	238.83
Feb 19–23, 2025	(South Korea) 2025 Four Continents Championships	11	70.11	13	134.77	13	204.88
Mar 25–30, 2025	(United States) 2025 World Championships	21	75.02	18	146.18	18	221.20

Results in the 2023–24 season
Date	Event	SP		FS		Total	
Date	Event	P	Score	P	Score	P	Score
Aug 16-18, 2023	(Thailand) 2023 Asian Open Trophy	1	72.02	1	123.12	1	195.14
Oct 3–5, 2023	(China) 2023 Shanghai Trophy	6	49.32	6	105.95	6	155.27
Nov 10–21, 2023	2023 Cup of China	11	64.25	11	121.31	11	185.56
Dec 22–24, 2023	(China) 2025 Chinese Championships	2	74.73	2	138.11	2	212.84
Jan 30 – Feb 4, 2024	(China) 2024 Four Continents Championships	16	66.04	22	102.47	20	168.52
Feb 24–26, 2025	(China) 2024 National Winter Games	2	75.75	2	159.48	2	235.23

Results in the 2025–26 season
Date	Event	SP		FS		Total	
Date	Event	P	Score	P	Score	P	Score
Oct 24–26, 2025	2025 Cup of China	12	61.82	10	135.72	11	197.54
Nov 14–16, 2025	(United States) 2025 Skate America	11	64.98	12	125.92	11	190.90
Dec 25–28, 2025	(China) 2026 Chinese Championships	4	77.30	4	160.85	4	238.15
