= 2022 Chinese Figure Skating Championships =

Figure skating competition

- Type: National championship
- Date: January 11 – 13, 2023
- Season: 2022–23
- Location: Chengde, Hebei
- Host: Chinese Skating Association
- Venue: Chengde Ice Sports Centre

Champions
- Men's singles: Chen Yudong
- Ladies' singles: An Xiangyi
- Pairs: Zhang Siyang / Yang Yongchao
- Ice dance: Chen Xizi / Xing Jianing
- Previous: 2020 Chinese Championships
- Next: 2023 Chinese Championships

The 2022 Chinese Figure Skating Championships (Chinese: 2022/2023年度全国花样滑冰锦标赛), originally scheduled to 25–31 December 2022, was held from 11-13 January 2023 in Chengde Ice Sports Centre in Chengde, Hebei. This was the first major national figure skating championships to be held in-person due to the COVID-19 pandemic in Mainland China since 2020. Medals were awarded in the disciplines of men's singles, ladies' singles, pair skating, and ice dance at the senior level.

== Schedule ==
Date	Discipline	Time	Segment
Wednesday, 11 January	Men's singles	14:00	Short program
Wednesday, 11 January	Women's singles	16:30	Short program
Thursday, 12 January	Ice dance	14:00	Rhythm dance
Thursday, 12 January	Pairs skating	15:15	Short program
Thursday, 12 January	Men's singles	16:45	Free program
Friday, 13 January	Ice dance	14:00	Free dance
Friday, 13 January	Pairs skating	15:25	Free program
Friday, 13 January	Women's singles	17:10	Free program
All times are listed in China time(UTC+08:00)

== Entries ==
The entry list is listed as follow

Men's single	Women's single	Pairs skating	Ice dancing
Wang Zhifei	Huang Can	Sun Youmei / Li Zeen	Cao Luchang / Chen Jianxu
Zhao Hanyu	Jin Shuxian	Yang Yixi / Deng Shunyang	Lu Yu / Zhang Chenhang
Zhou Zhehong	Megan Wong	Zhao Wantong / Liu Yuhang	Zhang Meihong / Meng Bolin
Yu Haoze	Li Ruotang	Zhang Siyang / Yang Yongchao	Li Xuantong / Wang Xinkang
Mei Geruiqi	Tong Ruichen	Wang Huidi / Jia Ziqi	Xiao Zixi / Wang Yi
Yu Zhile	Wen Yiyun	Wang Yunjie / Liu Helin	Chen Xizi / Xing Jianing
Chen Yudong	Li Yinxi	Zhang Xuanqi / Feng Wenqiang	
Gao Jian	Wang Kexin	Zhang Jiaxuan / Huang Yihang	
Wang Zexuan	Chen Hongyi		
Han Wenbao	Jin Guanru		
David Day	An Xiangyi		
Zhiuau Jiang	Zhang Ruiyang		
Xu Juwen	Zhu Yaxuan		
Peng Zhiming (test)	Xin Yuxuan		
	Cheng Jiaying		
Xiao Wanyi
Geng Wanxun

== Medalists ==
Disciplines	Gold	Silver	Bronze
Men's single	Chen Yudong; Beijing Winter Sports Management Center	Han Wenbao; Shanxi Winter Sports Training center	David Day; Guangdong Sports Bureau
Women's single	An Xiangyi; Beijing Winter Sports Management Center	Li Ruotang; Beijing Haotai Ice Sports Development Co. Ltd.	Tong Ruichen; Beijing Haotai Ice Sports Development Co. Ltd.
Pairs skating	Zhang Siyang / Yang Yongchao; Heilongjiang Ice Sports Training Center	Wang Huidi / Jia Ziqi; Heilongjiang Ice Sports Training Center	Zhang Jiaxuan / Huang Yihang; Qiqihar Winter Sports Management Center
Ice dancing	Chen Xizi / Xing Jianing; Harbin Winter Sports Management Center	Li Xuantong / Wang Xinkang; Harbin Winter Sports Management Center	Zhang Meihong / Meng Bolin; Harbin Winter Sports Management Center
Team	Heilongjiang Ice Sports Training Center; Zhang Siyang / Yang Yongchao (Pairs); Xu Juwen (Men's single); Geng Wantong (Women's single)	Guangdong Sports Bureau; Xiao Zixi / Wang Yi(Ice dancing); David Day(Men's single); Cheng Jiaying (Women's single)	Harbin Winter Sports Management Center; Chen Xizi / Xing Jianing(Ice dancing); Sun Youmei / Li Ze'en (Pairs); Zhu Yaxuan (Women's single)

== Results ==
=== Men's singles ===
Rank	Competitor	Representing club	Total score	SP		FS	
1	Chen Yudong	Beijing Winter Sports Management Center	193.00	2	68.77	1	124.23
2	Han Wenbao	Shanxi Winter Sports Training center	191.70	3	68.56	2	123.14
3	Dai Daiwei	Guangdong Sports Bureau	188.69	1	70.26	3	118.43
4	Xu Juwen	Heilongjiang Ice sports training center	161.81	4	56.38	6	105.43
5	Jiang Zhiau	Heilongjiang Ice sports training center	160.15	5	56.31	7	103.84
	Peng Zhiming	Guangdong Sports Bureau	158.41	test	49.38	test	109.03
6	Wang Zexuan	Shanxi Winter Sports Training center	153.40	7	47.21	5	106.19
7	Meige Ruiqi	Shanghai	151.12	8	44.61	4	106.51
8	Gao Jian	Shanxi Winter Sports Training center	146.49	6	48.08	8	98.41
9	Zhao Hanyu	Sichuan Sports vocational college	120.90	9	42.77	11	78.13
10	Yu Haoze	Li Chengjiang Figure Skating training center	122.63	12	36.54	9	86.09
11	Yu Zhile	Shanghai	117.52	11	37.18	10	80.34
12	Chow Chit Wang	Hong Kong Skating Union	112.30	10	39.92	12	73.38
WD	Wang Zhifei	Xi'an Aojia figure skating club	withdrew	withdrew from competition			

=== Women's singles ===
Rank	Competitor	Representing club	Total score	SP		FS	
1	An Xiangyi	Beijing Winter Sports Management Center	189.81	1	61.32	1	128.49
2	Li Ruotang	Beijing Haotai Ice Sports Development Co. Ltd.	171.96	3	59.33	2	112.63
3	Tong Ruichen	Beijing Haotai Ice Sports Development Co. Ltd.	169.04	4	57.86	4	111.18
4	Jin Shuxian	Beijing Century Star Skating Club (Jiuhua)	164.72	6	52.57	3	112.15
5	Zhang Ruiyang	Beijing Winter Sports Management Center	161.21	5	54.72	5	106.49
6	Chen Hongyi	Inner Mongolia Winter Sports Training Center	159.59	2	59.59	6	100.00
7	Cheng Jiaying	Guangdong Sports Bureau	130.59	10	42.47	7	88.12
8	Megan Wong	Hong Kong Skating Union	125.66	8	47.39	9	78.27
9	Geng Wanxun	Heilongjiang Ice sports Training Center	125.36	9	45.07	8	80.29
10	Li Yinxi	Beijing Shijingshan Qidicuican Skating Club	122.00	7	47.63	10	74.37
11	Huang Can	Wuxi Xiyue Figure Skating Club	110.99	11	37.89	11	73.10
12	Jin Guanru	Beijing Winter Sports Management Center	109.82	12	37.55	12	72.27
13	Wen Yiyun	Beijing Haotai Ice Sports Development Co. Ltd.	103.36	15	33.83	13	69.53
14	Sun Wanyi	Beijing Haotai Ice Sports Development Co. Ltd.	100.53	16	32.80	14	67.73
15	Xing Yuxuan	Shanxi Winter Sports Training Center	97.64	14	34.92	16	62.72
16	Wang Kexing	Beijing Shijingshan Qidicuican Skating Club	95.71	17	28.41	15	66.30
17	Zhu Yaxuan	Harbin Winter Sports Training Center	88.57	13	37.89	17	53.58

=== Pairs skating ===
Rank	Competitor	Representing club	Total score	SP		FS	
1	Zhang Siyang / Yang Yongchao	Heilongjiang Ice Sports Training Center	181.64	1	67.80	2	114.56
2	Wang Huidi / Jia Ziqi	Heilongjiang Ice Sports Training Center	181.09	2	62.32	1	118.77
3	Zhang Jiaxuan / Huang Yihang	Qiqihar Winter Sports Management Center	169.26	3	60.88	3	108.38
4	Sun Youmei / Li Ze'en	Aocan Sports & Culture (Tianjin) Co. Ltd/Harbin Winter Sports Management Center	144.70	6	48.65	4	96.05
5	Yang Yixi / Deng Shunyang	Guangxi Shooting & Archery Sports Development Centre	142.20	5	50.43	5	91.77
6	Zhao Wantong / Liu Yuhang	Heilongjiang Ice Sports Training Center	137.21	4	51.95	6	85.26
7	Wang Yunjie / Liu Helin	Qiqihar Winter Sports Management Center	99.58	7	36.92	8	62.66
8	Zhang Xuanqi / Feng Wenqiang	Qiqihar Winter Sports Management Center	98.25	8	33.82	7	64.43

=== Ice dancing ===
Rank	Competitor	Representing club	Total score	RD		FD	
1	Chen Xizi / Xing Jianing	Harbin Winter Sports Management Center	167.71	1	67.23	1	100.48
2	Li Xuantong / Wang Xinkang	Harbin Winter Sports Management Center	161.06	2	64.13	2	96.93
3	Zhang Meihong / Meng Bolin	Harbin Winter Sports Management Center	145.72	3	58.07	3	87.65
4	Cao Luchang / Chen Jianxu	Qiqihar Winter Sports Management Center	134.45	4	50.82	4	83.63
5	Xiao Zixi / Wang Yi	Guangdong Sports Bureau/ Jilin Province Winter Sports Management Center	123.89	5	47.54	5	76.35
6	Lu Yu / Zhang Chenhang	Beijing Sport University/The affiliated secondary school of Beijing Dance Academy	110.62	6	46.11	6	64.51
