= Zhang Ruiyang =

Chinese figure skater (born 2007)

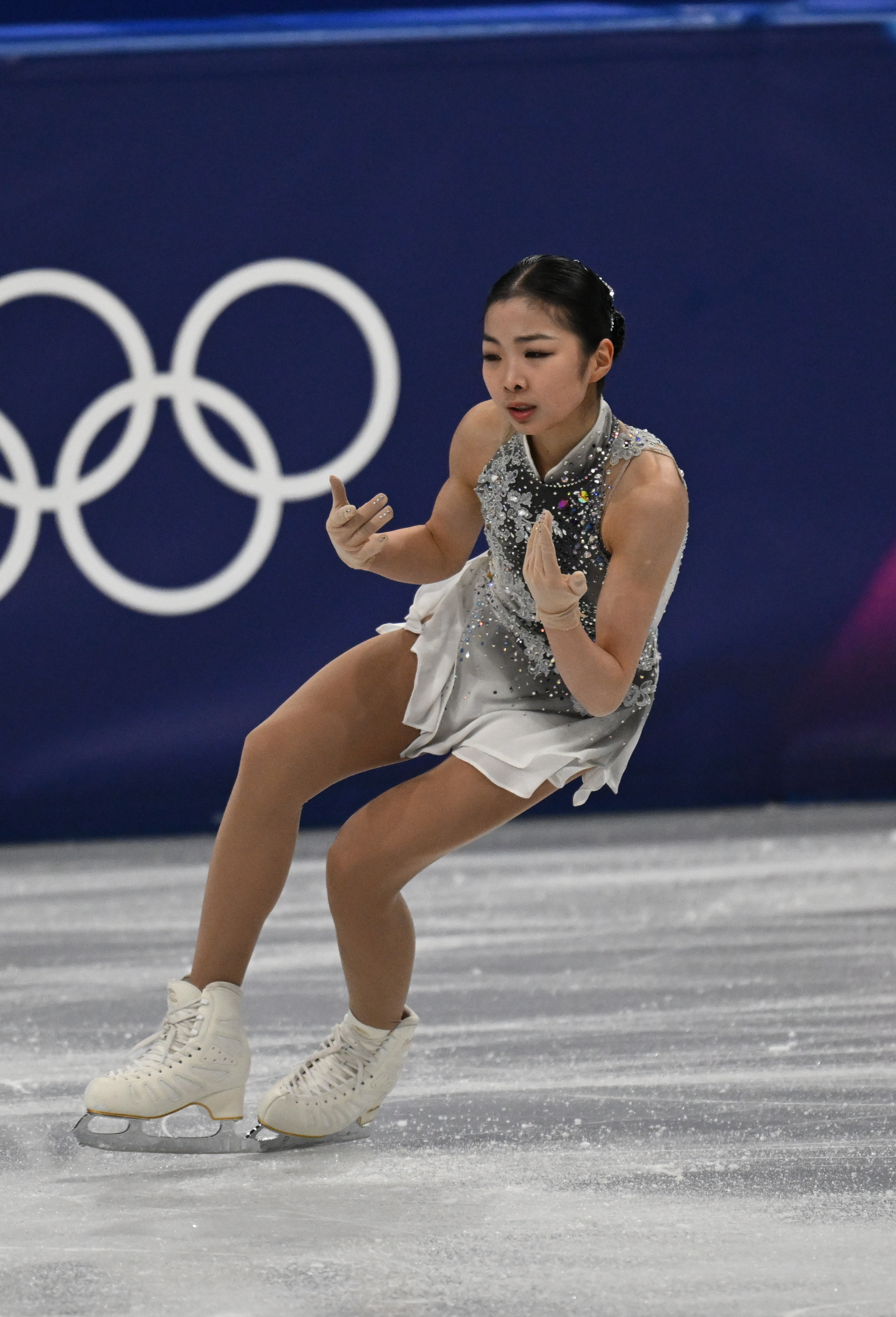
- Zhang Ruiyang during her free skate at the 2026 Winter Olympics

Personal information
- Native name: 张瑞阳 (Chinese)
- Other names: Dada
- Born: 21 December 2007 (age 18) Beijing, China
- Home town: Beijing, China
- Height: 1.56 m (5 ft 1 in)

Figure skating career
- Country: China
- Discipline: Women's singles
- Coach: Fu Caishu; Wang Jialei; Wang Jinze
- Skating club: Beijing New Century Star Skating Club
- Began skating: 2015
Chinese Championships
Silver medal – second place	2026 Harbin	Singles

Zhang Ruiyang (simplified Chinese: 张瑞阳; traditional Chinese: 張瑞陽; pinyin: Zhāng Ruìyáng; born 21 December 2007) is a Chinese figure skater. She is the 2026 Chinese national silver medalist and the 2025 Asian Open Trophy champion.

She represented China at the 2026 Winter Olympics.

== Personal life ==
Zhang was born on 21 December 2007, in Beijing, China. She is currently a student at Beijing No. 10 Middle School.

She is often nicknamed "Dada."

== Career ==
=== Early years ===
Zhang began skating at the age of six. She was then inspired to pursue the sport competitively after being moved by the "graceful movements and exquisite techniques" of figure skaters from online videos that her parents showed her.

She made her junior national debut at the 2022 Chinese Junior Championships, where she finished in sixth place. The following season, she competed on both the junior and senior level at the 2023 Chinese Championships, placing fourth and fifth, respectively.

=== 2023–2024 season: Junior international debut ===
Zhang started the season by making her junior international debut at 2023 JGP Austria, finishing in twelfth place.

In December, Zhang competed at the 2024 Chinese Championships, Zhang placed seventh at both the junior and senior levels. Two months later, she competed at the 14th Chinese National Winter Games, winning gold in the team event and placing fourth in the individual event.

=== 2024–2025 season ===
Zhang began her season by finishing fourth on the junior level at the 2024 Asian Open Trophy. She subsequently competed on the junior and senior level at the 2025 Chinese Championships, where she finished fifth and eighth, respectively.

=== 2025–2026 season: Senior international debut and Milano Cortina Olympics ===
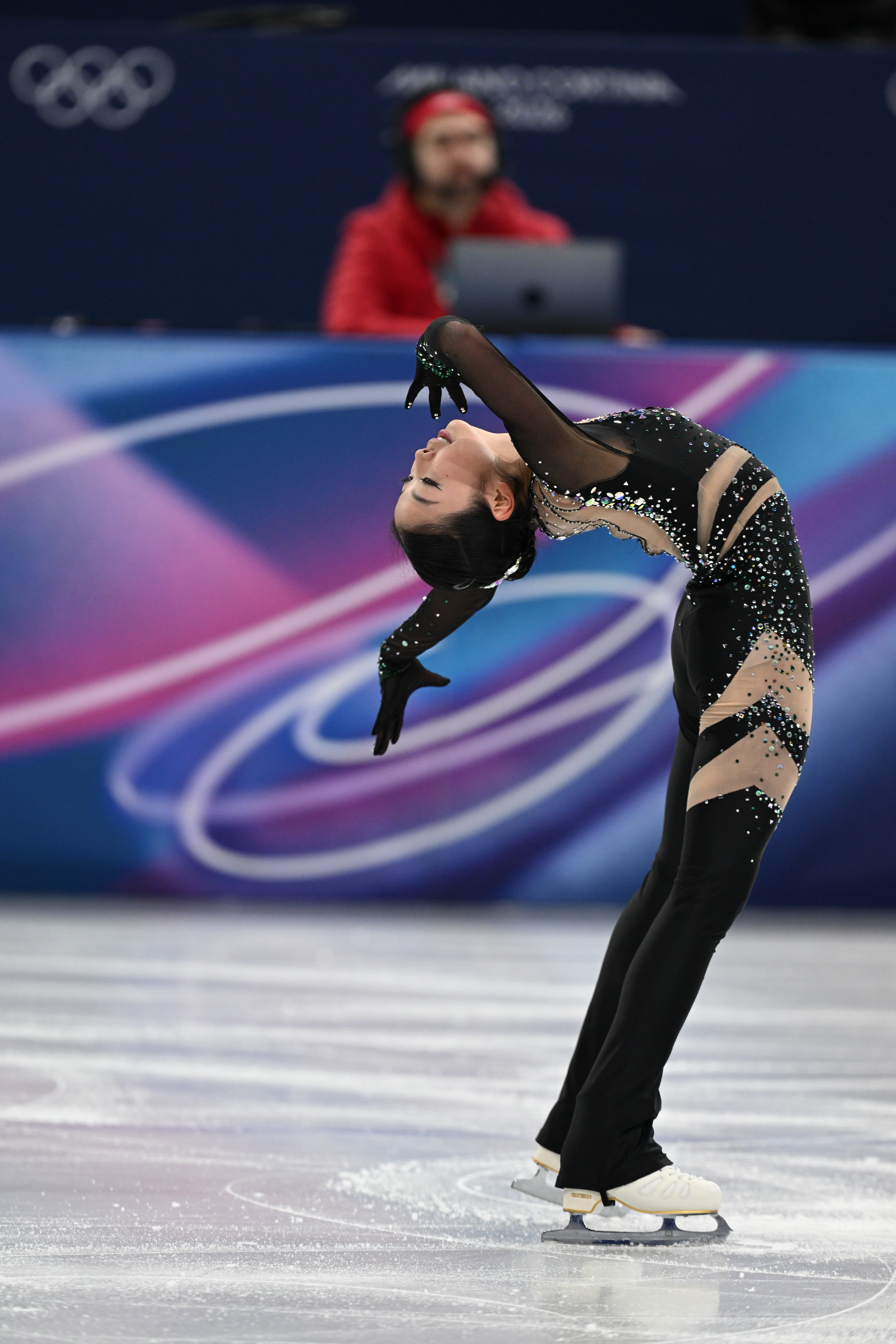
Zhang during her short program at the 2026 Winter Olympics

Zhang opened her season by making her senior international debut at the 2025 Asian Open Trophy, winning the gold medal. Because of this result, Zhang was selected to compete at the ISU Skate to Milano, the final qualifying event for the 2026 Winter Olympics, held in her hometown of Beijing.

At the event, Zhang scored personal bests in all competition segments after placing fourth in the short program, sixth in the free skate, and fifth overall. Her top five finish ultimately won China an Olympic berth in the women's singles event at the upcoming Olympics. Following the event, she shared, "I am very happy to have been able to secure an Olympic spot for China in this competition, because it was a lot of pressure. I have also been working on psychological aspects, and I have learned a great deal through this experience."

Selected as a host pick, Zhang made her Grand Prix debut at the 2025 Cup of China, finishing in seventh place overall. In December, she competed at the 2026 Chinese Championships, winning the silver medal behind fourteen-year old, Jin Shuxian. As a result of Jin being age ineligible to compete on the senior international level, Zhang was ultimately granted the sole women's singles skating spot for the 2026 Winter Olympics. She was also selected to compete at the 2026 Four Continents Championships and the 2026 World Championships.

In January, Zhang competed 2026 Four Continents Championships in Beijing, China, finishing in tenth place overall.

On 6 February, Zhang placed eighth in the short program in the 2026 Winter Olympics Figure Skating Team Event. "I'm very excited about being at the Olympics," she said. "I heard the cheering, I heard the enthusiasm, and I felt it and that was very exciting. I'm always telling myself to be confident at every competition. That will help me improve myself." Combined with her result, Team China placed eighth overall.

On 17 February, Zhang competed in the short program segment of the 2026 Winter Olympics – Women's singles event, placing twentieth. Two days later, she placed nineteenth in the free skate segment to place nineteenth overall. Reflecting on her time at the Olympics, Zhang shared, "I was able to learn from the characteristics of different athletes and different countries, and try to apply what I learned to myself to improve my performance, jumps and connections. Mentally, I think everyone will be nervous during the competition, and what I need to do is find a way to turn that nervousness into motivation."

The following month, Zhang made her World Championship debut at the 2026 World Championships in Prague, Czech Republic. She placed eighteenth in the short program but rose to fourteenth in the free skate, finishing sixteenth overall. "This is my first Worlds and this venue is really beautiful," she shared in an interview following her short program. "The light is great and the electric boards are exciting. I’m really happy to compete in major events like this and I especially like to travel to other countries to compete."

=== 2026–2027 season ===
Ruiyang opened her season in Kazakhstan at the 2026 CS Denis Ten Memorial, placing tenth overall.

== Programs ==
Season	Short program	Free skating	Exhibition
2026–2027	Asturias by Isaac Albéniz performed by Na Yoon-sun choreo. by Benoît Richaud	The Phantom of the Opera by Andrew Lloyd Webber; All I Ask of You performed by Josh Groban & Kelly Clarkson; Phantasia by Julian Lloyd Webber, Andrew Lloyd Webber, & Sarah Chang; The Music of the Night performed by Erich Kunzel & Cincinnati Pops Orchestra	
2025–2026	Frozen by Madonna choreo. by Adam Solya	Miss Saigon; Overture / The Heat Is On in Saigon; The Fall of Saigon; The Sacred Bird; The American Dream; This Is the Hour; Finale: Sun & Moon (Reprise) by Claude-Michel Schönberg performed by Lea Salonga choreo. Wang Jialei	Battle Without Honor or Humanity by Tomoyasu Hotei; Hallelujah by Leonard Cohen performed by Tori Kelly choreo. by Elvin Wong
2024–2025	Hallelujah by Leonard Cohen performed by Tori Kelly choreo. by Elvin Wong	Miss Saigon; Overture / The Heat Is On in Saigon; The Fall of Saigon; The Sacred Bird; The American Dream; This Is the Hour; Finale: Sun & Moon (Reprise) by Claude-Michel Schönberg performed by Lea Salonga choreo. Wang Jialei	
2023–2024	Hallelujah by Leonard Cohen performed by Tori Kelly choreo. by Elvin Wong	Until the Last Moment by Yanni choreo. by Elvin Wong	
2022–2023	Violin Concerto No. 4 in F Minor, RV 297, Op. 8 "L'inverno": I. Allegro non molto (from The Four Seasons) by Antonio Vivaldi performed by Anne-Sophie Mutter, Herbert von Karajan, & Vienna Philharmonic	Un bel dì, vedremo (from Madama Butterfly) by Giacomo Puccini performed by BBC Concert Orchestra, Barry Wordsworth, Mirella Freni, Vienna Philharmonic, & Herbert von Karajan	

== Competitive highlights ==
- GP – Event of the ISU Grand Prix Series
- JGP – Event of the ISU Junior Grand Prix Series
- TBD – Assigned
- Medals at team events are awarded for the team results only. Individual placements at team events are listed in parentheses.

Competition placements at senior level
Season	2022–23	2023–24	2024–25	2025–26	2026–27
Winter Olympics				19th	
Winter Olympics (Team event)				8th	
World Championships				16th	
Four Continents Championships				10th	
Chinese Championships	5th	7th	8th	2nd	
GP Cup of China				7th	9th
CS Denis Ten Memorial					10th
National Winter Games		4th			
National Winter Games (Team event)		1st (1st)			
Skate to Milano				5th	
Asian Open Trophy				1st	

Competition placements at junior level
Season	2021–22	2022–23	2023–24	2024–25
Chinese Championships	6th	4th	7th	5th
JGP Austria			12th	
Asian Open Trophy				4th

== Detailed results ==
ISU personal best scores in the +5/-5 GOE System
Segment	Type	Score	Event
Total	TSS	179.76	2025 Skate to Milano
Short program	TSS	62.78	2025 Skate to Milano
Short program	TES	35.85	2025 Skate to Milano
Short program	PCS	27.26	2026 Four Continents Championships
Free skating	TSS	119.80	2026 Four Continents Championships
Free skating	TES	64.29	2026 World Championships
Free skating	PCS	58.28	2026 Four Continents Championships

=== Senior level ===
Results in the 2022–23 season
Date	Event	SP		FS		Total	
Date	Event	P	Score	P	Score	P	Score
Dec 25–31, 2022	(China) 2023 Chinese Championships	5	54.72	5	106.49	5	161.21

Results in the 2023–24 season
Date	Event	SP		FS		Total	
Date	Event	P	Score	P	Score	P	Score
Dec 22–24, 2023	(China) 2024 Chinese Championships	4	55.81	7	106.14	7	161.95
Feb 21–22, 2024	(China) 14th Chinese National Winter Games (Team event)	1	—N/a	1	117.87	1	—N/a
Feb 25–26, 2024	(China) 14th Chinese National Winter Games	3	59.10	5	110.56	4	169.66

Results in the 2024–25 season
Date	Event	SP		FS		Total	
Date	Event	P	Score	P	Score	P	Score
Nov 28 – Dec 1, 2024	(China) 2025 Chinese Championships	5	61.25	11	105.35	8	166.60

Results in the 2025–26 season
Date	Event	SP		FS		Total	
Date	Event	P	Score	P	Score	P	Score
Aug 1–5, 2025	(Philippines) 2025 Asian Open Trophy	2	58.61	1	109.80	1	168.41
Sep 18–21, 2025	(China) 2025 Skate to Milano	4	62.78	6	116.98	5	179.76
Oct 24–26, 2025	2025 Cup of China	10	61.71	7	117.83	7	179.54
Dec 25–28, 2025	(China) 2026 Chinese Championships	2	68.86	2	128.72	2	197.58
Jan 21–25, 2026	(China) 2026 Four Continents Championships	11	58.81	8	119.80	10	178.61
Feb 6–8, 2026	(Italy) 2026 Winter Olympics – Team event	8	59.83	—N/a	—N/a	7	—N/a
Feb 17–19, 2026	(Italy) 2026 Winter Olympics	20	59.38	19	118.65	19	178.03
Mar 24–29, 2026	(Czech Republic) 2026 World Championships	18	58.96	14	119.17	16	178.13

Results in the 2026–27 season
Date	Event	SP		FS		Total	
Date	Event	P	Score	P	Score	P	Score
Oct 8–11, 2026	(Kazakhstan) 2026 CS Denis Ten Memorial Challenge	6	61.09	10	94.31	10	155.40
Nov 6–8, 2026	2026 Cup of China	8	61.20	9	105.52	9	166.72

=== Junior level ===
Results in the 2024–25 season
Date	Event	SP		FS		Total	
Date	Event	P	Score	P	Score	P	Score
Sep 2–6, 2024	(Hong Kong) 2024 Asian Open Trophy	5	51.14	4	99.90	4	151.04
Nov 13–15, 2024	(China) 2025 Chinese Junior Championships	8	48.75	5	106.81	5	155.56

Results in the 2023–24 season
Date	Event	SP		FS		Total	
Date	Event	P	Score	P	Score	P	Score
Aug 30 – Sep 2, 2023	2023 JGP Austria	12	47.48	10	97.73	12	145.21
Nov 24–26, 2023	(China) 2024 Chinese Junior Championships	9	50.25	5	93.86	7	144.11

Results in the 2022–23 season
Date	Event	SP		FS		Total	
Date	Event	P	Score	P	Score	P	Score
Dec 25–31, 2022	(China) 2023 Chinese Junior Championships	4	47.89	4	88.79	4	136.68

Results in the 2021–22 season
Date	Event	SP		FS		Total	
Date	Event	P	Score	P	Score	P	Score
Dec 18–19, 2021	(China) 2022 Chinese Junior Championships	6	40.11	5	79.13	6	119.24
