= Wang Yihan (figure skater) =

Chinese figure skater (born 2010)

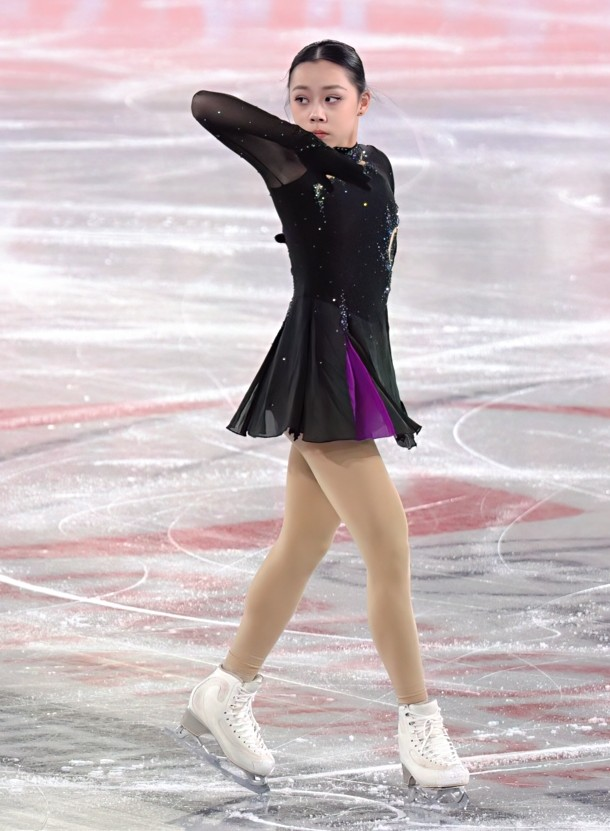
- Wang during the free skate at the 2024–25 Junior Grand Prix Final

Personal information
- Native name: 王一涵 (Chinese)
- Other names: Liuliu; Katie
- Born: 11 March 2010 (age 16) Beijing, China
- Home town: Beijing, China
- Height: 1.53 m (5 ft 0 in)

Figure skating career
- Country: China
- Discipline: Women's singles
- Coach: Gao Weijun; Satoko Miyahara
- Skating club: Beijing Xinghong Ao Skating Club
- Began skating: 2016
Chinese Championships
Gold medal – first place	2023 Chengde	Singles

Wang Yihan (Chinese: 王一涵; pinyin: Wáng Yīhán; born 11 March 2010) is a Chinese figure skater. She is the 2024 Chinese national champion, the 2024 JGP Thailand champion, 2026 JGP Latvia bronze medalist, the 2026 JGP Georgia gold medalist and the 2024 JGP China bronze medalist. She is the first Chinese woman to win a gold medal on the Junior Grand Prix.

== Personal life ==
Wang was born on 11 March 2010, in Beijing, China. Often nicknamed "Liuliu", she enjoys painting and dancing as hobbies. In addition, Wang is able to speak English proficiently.

She cites Mao Shimada and Shin Ji-a as her figure skating role models.

== Career ==
=== Early career ===
In 2015, following the successful bid for Wang's home city of Beijing to host the 2022 Winter Olympics, figure skating in China saw a sudden surge in popularity. This encouraged a then five-year-old Wang to try the sport for herself. During her first year of figure skating, she would constantly travel between the Shijingshan, Haidian, and Chaoyang districts since each public rink in Beijing often became too crowded for her to get sufficient practice time in one place. It was not until 2016 when Wang was able to join the Beijing Xinghong Ao Skating Club. There, Gao Weijun became her coach.

She debuted as an advanced novice skater at the 2022 Chinese Novice Championships, where she won silver. The following year, she won another silver medal at the 2023 Chinese Novice Championships.

=== 2023–24 season ===
Wang made her international debut on the 2023–24 ISU Junior Grand Prix circuit. She finished twelfth at 2023 JGP Hungary and fourth at 2023 JGP Poland. Wang would go on to win bronze at the 2024 Chinese Junior Championships. One month following those national championships, she would claim gold at the 2024 Chinese Championships in the senior women's event.

During the 2024 Four Continents Championships, held in Shanghai, China, Wang was invited to perform in the gala. She then finished off her season by taking gold on the junior level of the 2024 National Winter Games.

=== 2024–25 season ===
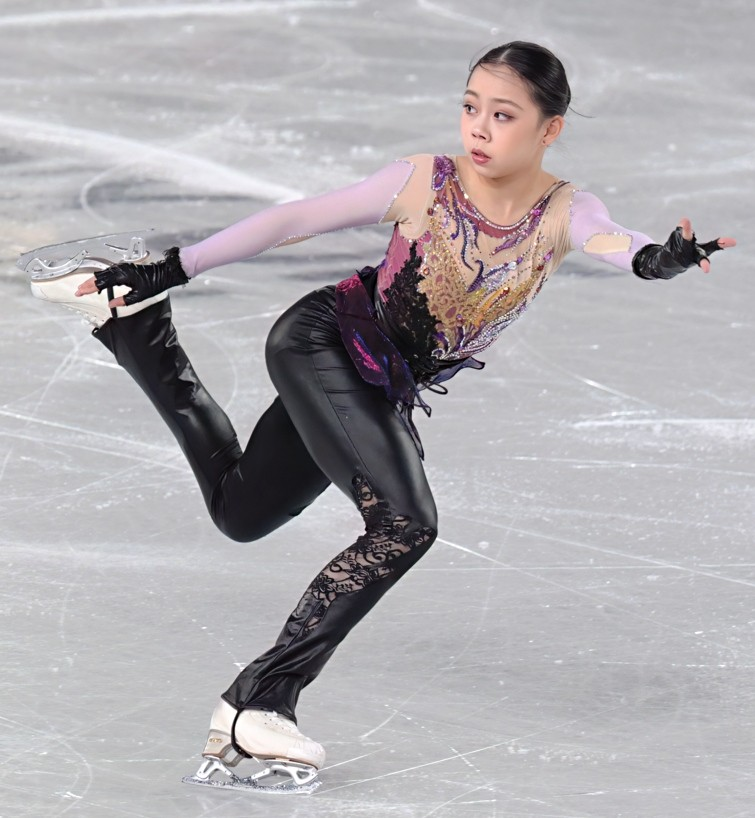
Wang during the short program at the 2024–25 Junior Grand Prix Final

Wang began her season by competing on the Junior Grand Prix circuit. At her first assignment, the 2024 JGP Thailand, three-time World Junior silver medalist Shin Ji-a entered as the gold medal favourite, but struggled. Wang unexpectedly claimed the gold medal, making history as the first skater from China to win a Junior Grand Prix title in the women's singles event. She followed this achievement with a bronze medal finish on home ice at the 2024 JGP China, qualifying for the 2024–25 Junior Grand Prix Final. At the Final, Wang skated two clean programs and finished in fourth place overall. Following the event, she said, "I feel really happy as I was able to land my jumps. This is my first time in the JGP final and that made me feel a bit nervous but I enjoyed skating here a lot."

Selected to compete at the 2025 World Junior Championships in late February, Wang placed eighth in the short program and sixteenth in the free skate, finishing twelfth overall.

=== 2025–26 season ===
Wang started the season by competing on the Junior Grand Prix series, winning bronze at 2025 JGP Italy and placing fourth at 2025 JGP Azerbaijan. In December, she won the 2026 Chinese Junior Championships.

Selected to compete at the 2026 Junior World Championships in Tallinn, Estonia, Wang placed sixth in the short program and sixth in the free skate to finish in fifth place overall. "I am satisfied with my performance today," she said following her free skate. "I landed all the jumps and I was able to show what I do in training. Compared to last season, I am able to enjoy the competition more, feel calmer and more grounded."

=== 2026–27 season ===
In early August, it was announced that former two-time World medalist, Satoko Miyahara, had joined Wang's coaching team.

Yihan opened her season at the Junior Grand Prix in Latvia, earning new ISU personal best scores in both program segments, as well as overall. She won the bronze medal behind Mei Okada and Hana Bath. Yihan followed this up by winning gold at the Junior Grand Prix in Georgia, achieving new personal best scores in the short program segment, as well as her overall total score. Her results qualified her for the Junior Grand Prix Final.

== Programs ==
Season	Short program	Free skating	Exhibition
2026–2027	Tempête (from Alcyone) by Marin Marais performed by Jordi Savall & Le Concert des Nations; Click Clack Symphony by Raye & Hans Zimmer choreo. by Stéphane Lambiel	Scene XIV - Pas de deux: Dance of the Prince & the Sugar-Plum Fairy (from The Nutcracker) by Pyotr Ilyich Tchaikovsky performed by Royal Philharmonic Orchestra & David Maninov choreo. by Satoko Miyahara	
2025–2026	Mona Ki Ngi Xica by Bonga; Concierto Para Bongó by Pérez Prado choreo. by Benoît Richaud; Prelude in C-sharp minor by Sergei Rachmaninoff choreo. by Misha Ge	Snow Above the Earth by Nico Cartosio choreo. by David Wilson	
2024–2025	Paint It Black by The Rolling Stones performed by Hidden Citizens choreo. by Misha Ge	Main Theme I (Opening); The Gold Pavilion (from The Grandmaster) by Shigeru Umebayashi & Nathaniel Méchaly; Wing Chung by Fan Yang choreo. by Zeng Jiaxin	
2023–2024	Scheherazade by Nikolai Rimsky-Korsakov performed by Juan García Esquivel choreo. by Elvin Wong	Orobroy Vs; Semblanzas de un río by David Peña Dorantes choreo. by Elvin Wong	Girl on Fire (from Glee) by Alicia Keys performed by Naya Rivera

== Competitive highlights ==
- JGP – Event of the ISU Junior Grand Prix Series
- TBD – Assigned
- WD – Withdrew from competition

Competition placements at senior level
Season	2023–24
Chinese Championships	1st

Competition placements at junior level
Season	2023–24	2024–25	2025–26	2026–27
World Junior Championships		12th	5th	
Junior Grand Prix Final		4th		TBD
Chinese Championships	3rd		1st	
JGP Azerbaijan			4th	
JGP China		3rd		
JGP Hungary	12th			
JGP Italy			3rd	
JGP Latvia				3rd
JGP Poland	4th			
JGP Thailand		1st		
JGP Georgia				1st
National Winter Games	1st			

== Detailed results ==
ISU personal best scores in the +5/-5 GOE System
Segment	Type	Score	Event
Total	TSS	201.82	2026 JGP Georgia
Short program	TSS	73.38	2026 JGP Georgia
Short program	TES	43.88	2026 JGP Georgia
Short program	PCS	29.50	2026 JGP Georgia
Free skating	TSS	129.32	2024 JGP Thailand
Free skating	TES	72.20	2024 JGP China
Free skating	PCS	59.22	2026 JGP Georgia

=== Senior level ===
Results in the 2023–24 season
Date	Event	SP		FS		Total	
Date	Event	P	Score	P	Score	P	Score
Dec 22–24, 2023	(China) 2024 Chinese Championships	1	63.61	2	124.98	1	188.59

=== Junior level ===
Results in the 2023–24 season
Date	Event	SP		FS		Total	
Date	Event	P	Score	P	Score	P	Score
Sep 20–23, 2023	2023 JGP Hungary	4	60.43	13	94.85	12	155.28
Sep 27–30, 2023	2023 JGP Poland	6	59.06	3	117.24	4	176.30
Nov 24–26, 2023	(China) 2025 Chinese Junior Championships	3	56.24	3	117.16	3	173.40
Jan 17–19, 2024	(China) 14th Chinese National Winter Games	1	64.16	1	128.61	1	192.77

Results in the 2024–25 season
Date	Event	SP		FS		Total	
Date	Event	P	Score	P	Score	P	Score
Sep 11–14, 2024	2024 JGP Thailand	1	65.39	1	129.32	1	194.71
Oct 9–12, 2024	2024 JGP China	4	63.15	2	128.96	3	192.11
Dec 5–8, 2024	(France) 2024–25 Junior Grand Prix Final	4	64.52	3	123.38	4	187.90
Feb 25 – Mar 2, 2025	(Hungary) 2025 World Junior Championships	8	63.44	16	112.07	12	175.51

Results in the 2025–26 season
Date	Event	SP		FS		Total	
Date	Event	P	Score	P	Score	P	Score
Sep 3–6, 2025	2025 JGP Italy	2	60.91	4	120.30	3	181.21
Sep 24–27, 2025	2025 JGP Azerbaijan	2	60.96	4	115.67	4	176.63
Dec 12–14, 2025	(China) 2026 Chinese Junior Championships	1	70.92	1	126.22	1	197.14
Mar 3–8, 2026	(Estonia) 2026 World Junior Championships	6	63.44	6	121.93	5	185.37

Results in the 2026–27 season
Date	Event	SP		FS		Total	
Date	Event	P	Score	P	Score	P	Score
Aug 27–29, 2026	2026 JGP Latvia	3	68.61	3	126.42	3	195.03
Sep 24–26, 2026	(Georgia (country)) 2026 JGP Georgia	1	73.38	2	128.44	1	201.82
