= Zhang Jiaxuan =

Chinese pair skater (born 2007)

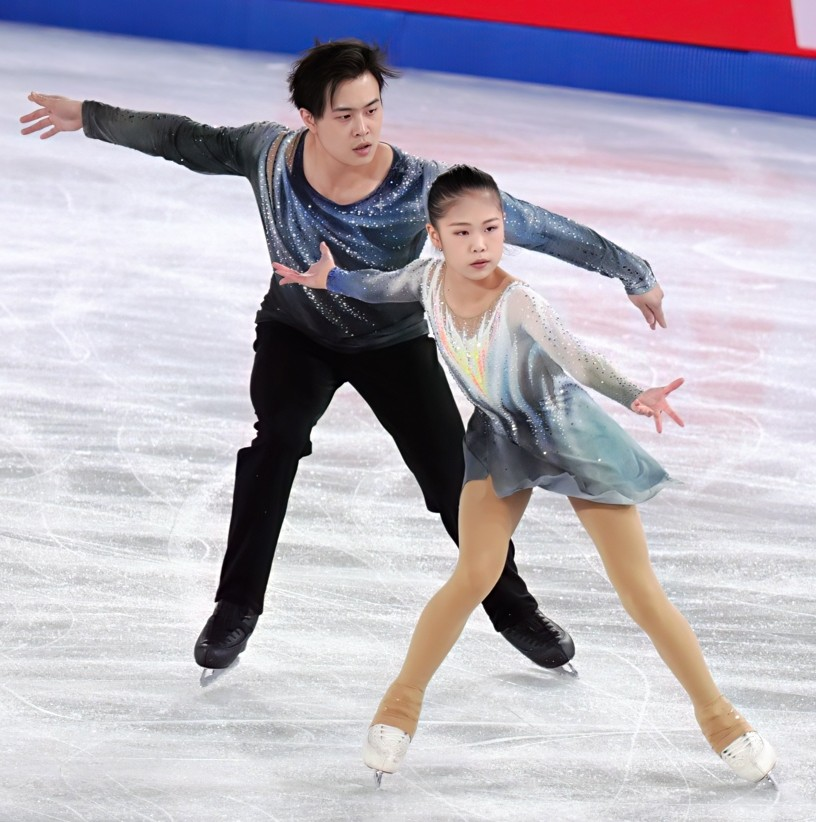
- Zhang Jiaxuan and Yihang Huang at the 2024–25 Junior Grand Prix Final

Personal information
- Native name: 张嘉轩 (Chinese)
- Born: August 17, 2007 (age 19) Qiqihar, China

Figure skating career
- Country: China
- Partner: Huang Yihang (since 2022); Wang Zhiyu (2019–2020)
- Coach: Ding Yang; Du Jiayuan
- Skating club: Heilongjiang Heilong Ice and Snow Sports Club
- Began skating: 2014

Medal record
Chinese Championships
Gold medal – first place	2024 Chengde	Pairs
Silver medal – second place	2023 Chengde	Pairs
Bronze medal – third place	2022 Chengde	Pairs
Bronze medal – third place	2025 Harbin	Pairs
Junior Grand Prix Final
Gold medal – first place	2024–25 Grenoble	Pairs

Zhang Jiaxuan (Chinese: 张嘉轩; pinyin: Zhāng Jiāxuān; born August 17, 2007) is a Chinese pair skater. With skating partner, Huang Yihang, she is the 2024 Chinese national champion and the 2026 CS Nebelhorn Trophy bronze medalist.

On the junior level, she is the 2024–25 Junior Grand Prix Final champion and a two-time ISU Junior Grand Prix gold medalist.

== Personal life ==
Zhang was born on August 17, 2007 in Qiqihar, Heilongjiang, China.

She looks up to Olympic champion pair team, Sui/Han.

== Career ==
=== Early career ===
Zhang began figure skating in 2014. Originally a singles skater, she would debut as a pair skater in 2019 after teaming up with Wang Zhiyu. The pair were coached by Luan Bo and placed fifth at the 2020 Chinese Junior Championships. Zhang/Wang parted ways after the 2019–20 figure skating season finished.

=== Partnership with Huang ===
==== 2022–2023 and 2023–2024 seasons ====
For the 2022–23 figure skating season, Zhang teamed up with Huang Yihang. Upon getting together, the pair began training in Beijing with Ding Yang as their coach.

In their first appearance together at the Chinese Championships, Huang/Zhang won the bronze medal. The following year, they won the silver medal at the 2023 Chinese Championships.

==== 2024–2025 season: Junior international debut and JGP Final gold ====
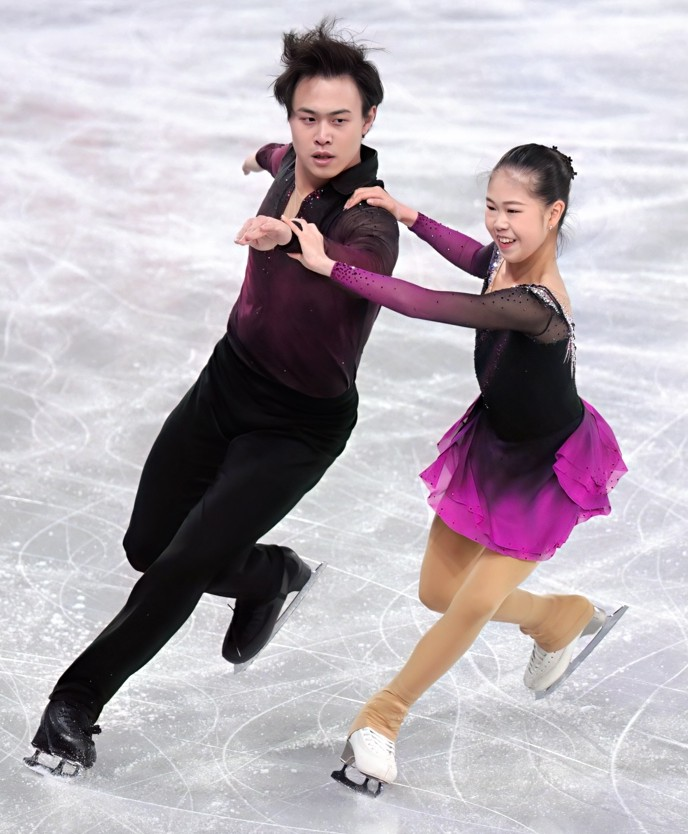
Zhang/Huang during the short program at the 2024–25 Junior Grand Prix Final

On the 2024–25 ISU Junior Grand Prix circuit, Zhang/Huang made their international debut. The pair won gold both their assigned events, 2024 JGP Latvia and 2024 JGP Poland. With these results, the pair qualified for the 2024–25 Junior Grand Prix Final in Grenoble, France as the highest ranking junior pair team.

In late November, Zhang/Huang won gold at the 2024 Chinese Championships. The following week, they would win the Junior Grand Prix Final by over twenty points. Regarding this win, Zhang said, "It is a great honour for us to be here at the Junior Grand Prix Final. We hope to improve to be able to do even better in the future. Our goal is not only to improve on our technical but also on our artistry."

They concluded the season with a fifth-place finish at the 2025 World Junior Championships in Debrecen, Hungary. “We will be skating in seniors,” said Zhang regarding next season. “We think we have to make our technical elements stronger and more difficult so that we can compete with the seniors.”

==== 2025–2026 season: Senior international debut ====
Making their senior international debut as a pair, Zhang/Huang opened the season by winning the gold medal at the 2025 Asian Open Trophy. They were subsequently selected to compete at the ISU Skate to Milano, the final qualifying event for the 2026 Winter Olympics, where they won the gold medal and thus secured an Olympic berth for Chinese pair skating.

In late October, Zhang/Huang made their senior Grand Prix debut at the 2025 Cup of China, where they finished in fourth place. "I feel still feel a bit nervous because it is my first senior Grand Prix event," Zhang confessed after the free skate. "We've made a few mistakes, like small mistakes in the program. This is okay, but it's not our best level, and we want to keep working on the program to do better next time." A couple weeks later, they finished sixth at the 2025 Finlandia Trophy.

In December, Zhang/Huang won the bronze medal at the 2026 Chinese Championships behind Sui/Han and Guo/Zhang. The following month, Zhang and Huang placed fourth at the 2026 Four Continents Championships in their debut at this event. "Coming from the provincial championships, I feel that our speed might be much worse than of other senior athletes," said Huang after the free skate. "We gradually improved our speed and the quality of the program, including some content, elements and performance aspects."

== Programs ==
=== Pair skating with Huang Yihang ===
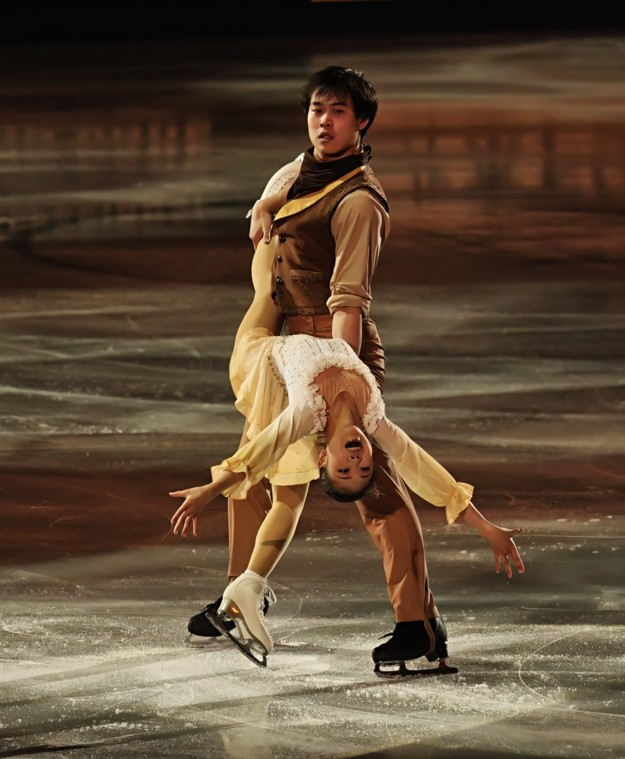
Zhang/Yihang Huang during the gala at the 2024–25 Junior Grand Prix Final

Season	Short program	Free skating	Exhibition
2025–2026	Nemesis by Benjamin Clementine choreo. by Aljona Savchenko	Re:member by Ólafur Arnalds; O by Coldplay; Only the Winds by Ólafur Arnalds choreo. by Benoît Richaud	Turning Page by Sleeping at Last
2024–2025	Dive by Ed Sheeran choreo. by Sui Wenjing	All for One by HAEL & Hidden Citizens choreo. by Sui Wenjing	A Larger Cello by Jay Chou
2023–2024	A Larger Cello by Jay Chou	All for One by HAEL & Hidden Citizens choreo. by Sui Wenjing	
2022–2023	Wanna Be Startin' Somethin'; Billie Jean; Smooth Criminal; Come Together; Dangerous by Michael Jackson	The Curse of the Sad Mummy by League of Legends	

== Competitive highlights ==
- GP – Event of the ISU Grand Prix Series
- JGP – Event of the ISU Junior Grand Prix Series
- CS – Event of the ISU Challenger Series
- TBD – Assigned
- WD – Withdrew from competition

=== Pair skating with Huang Yihang ===
Competition placements at senior level
Season	2022–23	2023–24	2024–25	2025–26	2026–27
World Championships				9th	
Four Continents Championships				4th	
Chinese Championships	3rd	2nd	1st	3rd	
GP Cup of China				4th	7th
GP Finland				6th	
GP France					7th
CS Nebelhorn Trophy					3rd
Asian Open Trophy				1st	
Skate to Milano				1st	

Competition placements at junior level
Season	2024–25
World Junior Championships	5th
Junior Grand Prix Final	1st
JGP Italy	1st
JGP Poland	1st

== Detailed results ==
=== Pair skating with Huang Yihang ===
ISU personal best scores in the +5/-5 GOE System
Segment	Type	Score	Event
Total	TSS	196.29	2026 Four Continents Championships
Short program	TSS	69.05	2026 Four Continents Championships
Short program	TES	39.68	2026 Four Continents Championships
Short program	PCS	29.37	2026 Four Continents Championships
Free skating	TSS	127.24	2026 Four Continents Championships
Free skating	TES	68.48	2026 Four Continents Championships
Free skating	PCS	59.75	2026 Four Continents Championships

==== Senior level ====
Results in the 2025–26 season
Date	Event	SP		FS		Total	
Date	Event	P	Score	P	Score	P	Score
Aug 1–5, 2025	(Philippines) 2025 Asian Open Trophy	1	63.70	1	126.53	1	190.23
Sep 18–21, 2025	(China) 2025 ISU Skate to Milano	1	66.68	1	124.84	1	191.52
Oct 24–26, 2025	2025 Cup of China	5	68.96	4	126.45	4	195.41
Nov 21–23, 2025	(Finland) 2025 Finlandia Trophy	7	62.42	5	122.86	6	185.28
Dec 25–28, 2025	(China) 2026 Chinese Championships	2	72.35	3	127.75	3	200.10
Jan 21–25, 2026	(China) 2026 Four Continents Championships	4	69.05	2	127.24	4	196.29
Mar 24–29, 2026	(Czech Republic) 2026 World Championships	14	62.69	10	122.21	9	184.90

Results in the 2026–27 season
Date	Event	SP		FS		Total	
Date	Event	P	Score	P	Score	P	Score
Sep 24–26, 2026	(Germany) 2026 CS Nebelhorn Trophy	3	64.35	5	103.19	3	167.54
Oct 23-25, 2026	2026 Grand Prix de France	7	54.16	6	99.55	7	153.71
Nov 6–8, 2026	2026 Cup of China	8	56.52	6	99.58	7	156.10

2024–25 season
Date	Event	SP	FS	Total
November 28–December 1, 2024	2024 Chinese Championships	1; 61.35	1; 113.83	1; 175.83
2023–24 season
Date	Event	SP	FS	Total
December 22–24, 2023	2023 Chinese Championships	2; 62.73	3; 106.38	2; 169.11
2022–23 season
Date	Event	SP	FS	Total
January 11–13, 2023	2022 Chinese Championships	3; 60.88	3; 108.38	3; 169.26

==== Junior level ====
2024–25 season
Date	Event	SP	FS	Total
February 26–March 3, 2025	2025 World Junior Championships	3; 57.38	9; 94.03	5; 151.41
December 5–8, 2024	2024–25 JGP Final	1; 62.94	1; 113.15	1; 176.09
September 26–28, 2024	2024 JGP Poland	1; 57.88	1; 104.08	1; 161.96
August 28–31, 2024	2024 JGP Latvia	3; 54.21	1; 105.55	1; 159.76
