= 2023 Cup of China =

Figure skating competition

- Type: Grand Prix
- Date: November 10 – 12
- Season: 2023–24
- Location: Chongqing, China
- Host: Chinese Skating Association
- Venue: Chongqing Huaxi Culture and Sports Center

Champions
- Men's singles: (France) Adam Siao Him Fa
- Women's singles: (Japan) Hana Yoshida
- Pairs: (Canada) Deanna Stellato-Dudek / Maxime Deschamps
- Ice dance: (Canada) Piper Gilles / Paul Poirier
- Previous: 2020 Cup of China
- Next: 2024 Cup of China
- Previous Grand Prix: 2023 Grand Prix de France
- Next Grand Prix: 2023 Grand Prix of Espoo

The 2023 Cup of China was the fourth event of the 2023–24 ISU Grand Prix of Figure Skating: a senior-level international invitational competition series. It was held at the Chongqing Huaxi Culture and Sports Center in Chongqing from November 10–12. Medals were awarded in men's singles, women's singles, pair skating, and ice dance. Skaters earned points toward qualifying for the 2023–24 Grand Prix Final.

== Entries ==
The International Skating Union announced the preliminary assignments on June 28, 2023.

| Country | Men | Women | Pairs | Ice dance |
|---|---|---|---|---|
| Belgium | | Loena Hendrickx | | |
| Canada | | Madeline Schizas | Deanna Stellato-Dudek / Maxime Deschamps | Piper Gilles / Paul Poirier; Marjorie Lajoie / Zachary Lagha |
| China | Dai Daiwei; Jin Boyang; Xu Juwen | An Xiangyi; Chen Hongyi; Zhu Yi | Peng Cheng / Wang Lei; Wang Yuchen / Zhu Lei; Zhang Siyang / Yang Yongchao | Chen Xizi / Xing Jianing; Shi Shang / Wu Nan |
| Estonia | | Niina Petrõkina | | |
| France | Adam Siao Him Fa | | | Loïcia Demougeot / Théo le Mercier |
| Georgia | | | | Maria Kazakova / Georgy Reviya |
| Germany | | | Annika Hocke / Robert Kunkel | |
| Italy | Gabriele Frangipani | | Rebecca Ghilardi / Filippo Ambrosini; Anna Valesi / Manuel Piazza | |
| Japan | Kazuki Tomono; Shoma Uno; Sōta Yamamoto | Rinka Watanabe; Hana Yoshida | | |
| Kazakhstan | Mikhail Shaidorov | | | |
| Poland | | Ekaterina Kurakova | | |
| South Korea | Lee Si-hyeong | Kim Ye-lim | | |
| United States | Lucas Broussard; Jimmy Ma | Audrey Shin | Maria Mokhova / Ivan Mokhov | Emily Bratti / Ian Somerville; Caroline Green / Michael Parsons; Eva Pate / Logan Bye |

== Changes to preliminary assignments ==
| Discipline | Withdrew | | Added | | Notes | Ref. |
| Discipline | Date | Skater(s) | Date | Skater(s) | Notes | Ref. |
|---|---|---|---|---|---|---|
| Men | — | | August 17 | (China) Dai Daiwei | Host picks | |
| Men | — | | August 17 | (China) Jin Boyang | Host picks | |
| Men | — | | August 17 | (China) Zhang He | Host picks | |
| Women | — | | August 17 | (China) An Xiangyi | Host picks | |
| Women | — | | August 17 | (China) Chen Hongyi | Host picks | |
| Women | — | | August 17 | (China) Zhu Yi | Host picks | |
| Pairs | — | | August 17 | (China) Peng Cheng / Wang Lei | Host picks | |
| Pairs | — | | August 17 | (China) Zhang Siyang / Yang Yongchao | Host picks | |
| Pairs | — | | August 17 | (China) Wang Yuchen / Zhu Lei | Host picks | |
| Ice dance | — | | August 17 | (China) Wang Shiyue / Liu Xinyu | Host picks | |
| Ice dance | — | | August 17 | (China) Chen Xizi / Xing Jianing | Host picks | |
| Pairs | August 29 | (United States) Anastasiia Smirnova / Danylo Siianytsia | September 4 | (United States) Maria Mokhova / Ivan Mokhov | Smirnova retired. | |
| Men | October 13 | (China) Zhang He | October 13 | (China) Xu Juwen | Injury | |
| Pairs | October 19 | (United States) Emily Chan / Spencer Akira Howe | October 23 | (Italy) Anna Valesi / Manuel Piazza | | |
| Women | November 1 | (United States) Bradie Tennell | November 2 | (Poland) Ekaterina Kurakova | | |
| Ice dance | November 3 | (China) Wang Shiyue / Liu Xinyu | November 3 | (China) Shi Shang / Wu Nan | | |
| Ice dance | November 3 | (Czech Republic) Natálie Taschlerová / Filip Taschler | — | | | |
| Women | November 6 | (Japan) Mai Mihara | — | | Injury | |

== Results ==
=== Men's singles ===
| Rank | Skater | Nation | Total points | SP | | FS | |
|---|---|---|---|---|---|---|---|
| 1st place, gold medalist(s) | Adam Siao Him Fa | France | 298.38 | 2 | 91.21 | 1 | 207.17 |
| 2nd place, silver medalist(s) | Shoma Uno | Japan | 279.98 | 1 | 105.25 | 2 | 174.73 |
| 3rd place, bronze medalist(s) | Mikhail Shaidorov | Kazakhstan | 264.46 | 3 | 89.94 | 3 | 174.52 |
| 4 | Kazuki Tomono | Japan | 251.95 | 6 | 80.50 | 4 | 171.45 |
| 5 | Gabriele Frangipani | Italy | 251.59 | 5 | 85.19 | 6 | 166.40 |
| 6 | Sōta Yamamoto | Japan | 245.58 | 8 | 75.48 | 5 | 170.10 |
| 7 | Boyang Jin | China | 237.28 | 4 | 87.44 | 7 | 149.84 |
| 8 | Lee Si-hyeong | South Korea | 209.13 | 9 | 74.43 | 8 | 134.70 |
| 9 | Jimmy Ma | United States | 205.16 | 7 | 77.29 | 10 | 127.87 |
| 10 | Xu Juwen | China | 193.79 | 10 | 65.57 | 9 | 128.22 |
| 11 | Dai Daiwei | China | 185.56 | 11 | 64.25 | 11 | 121.31 |
| 12 | Lucas Broussard | United States | 181.15 | 12 | 61.05 | 12 | 120.10 |

=== Women's singles ===
| Rank | Skater | Nation | Total points | SP | | FS | |
|---|---|---|---|---|---|---|---|
| 1st place, gold medalist(s) | Hana Yoshida | Japan | 203.97 | 3 | 64.65 | 1 | 139.32 |
| 2nd place, silver medalist(s) | Rinka Watanabe | Japan | 203.22 | 2 | 65.09 | 2 | 138.13 |
| 3rd place, bronze medalist(s) | Loena Hendrickx | Belgium | 201.49 | 1 | 70.65 | 3 | 130.84 |
| 4 | Niina Petrõkina | Estonia | 188.04 | 4 | 62.58 | 4 | 125.46 |
| 5 | Madeline Schizas | Canada | 179.58 | 7 | 61.53 | 5 | 118.05 |
| 6 | Kim Ye-lim | South Korea | 176.68 | 8 | 59.56 | 6 | 117.12 |
| 7 | Ekaterina Kurakova | Poland | 173.15 | 9 | 57.37 | 7 | 115.78 |
| 8 | Chen Hongyi | China | 168.66 | 5 | 62.57 | 8 | 106.09 |
| 9 | Audrey Shin | United States | 156.84 | 10 | 50.97 | 9 | 105.87 |
| 10 | Zhu Yi | China | 154.58 | 11 | 50.96 | 10 | 103.62 |
| 11 | An Xiangyi | China | 152.36 | 6 | 61.86 | 11 | 90.50 |

=== Pairs ===
| Rank | Team | Nation | Total points | SP | | FS | |
|---|---|---|---|---|---|---|---|
| 1st place, gold medalist(s) | Deanna Stellato-Dudek / Maxime Deschamps | Canada | 201.48 | 1 | 70.39 | 1 | 131.09 |
| 2nd place, silver medalist(s) | Rebecca Ghilardi / Filippo Ambrosini | Italy | 191.00 | 2 | 66.33 | 2 | 124.67 |
| 3rd place, bronze medalist(s) | Peng Cheng / Wang Lei | China | 178.06 | 3 | 62.91 | 3 | 115.15 |
| 4 | Annika Hocke / Robert Kunkel | Germany | 170.65 | 4 | 60.76 | 4 | 109.89 |
| 5 | Zhang Siyang / Yang Yongchao | China | 161.65 | 5 | 58.71 | 6 | 102.94 |
| 6 | Anna Valesi / Manuel Piazza | Italy | 160.65 | 6 | 55.55 | 5 | 105.10 |
| 7 | Wang Yuchen / Zhu Lei | China | 139.35 | 7 | 49.95 | 8 | 89.40 |
| 8 | Maria Mokhova / Ivan Mokhov | United States | 134.81 | 8 | 42.65 | 7 | 92.16 |

=== Ice dance ===
| Rank | Team | Nation | Total points | RD | | FD | |
|---|---|---|---|---|---|---|---|
| 1st place, gold medalist(s) | Piper Gilles / Paul Poirier | Canada | 207.83 | 2 | 81.04 | 1 | 126.79 |
| 2nd place, silver medalist(s) | Marjorie Lajoie / Zachary Lagha | Canada | 206.02 | 1 | 82.02 | 2 | 124.00 |
| 3rd place, bronze medalist(s) | Caroline Green / Michael Parsons | United States | 189.33 | 3 | 76.07 | 3 | 113.26 |
| 4 | Eva Pate / Logan Bye | United States | 184.58 | 4 | 73.29 | 4 | 111.29 |
| 5 | Loïcia Demougeot / Théo le Mercier | France | 180.10 | 7 | 70.18 | 5 | 109.92 |
| 6 | Emily Bratti / Ian Somerville | United States | 179.39 | 5 | 71.17 | 7 | 108.22 |
| 7 | Maria Kazakova / Georgy Reviya | Georgia | 178.66 | 6 | 70.58 | 6 | 108.28 |
| 8 | Chen Xizi / Xing Jianing | China | 159.72 | 8 | 62.05 | 8 | 96.67 |
| 9 | Shi Shang / Wu Nan | China | 138.86 | 9 | 51.80 | 9 | 87.06 |
