= Constanze Paulinus =

German figure skater

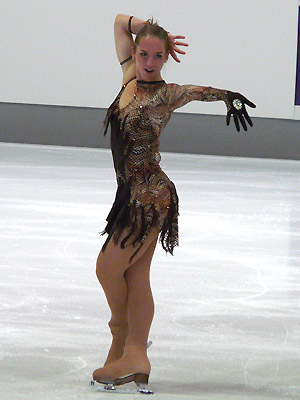
- Paulinus in 2007.

Personal information
- Born: 9 July 1985 (age 41)

Figure skating career
- Country: Germany
- Skating club: TSC Berlin
- Began skating: 1990
- Retired: 2011

Constanze Paulinus (born 9 July 1985 in Berlin) is a German former competitive figure skater. She won five senior international medals, including gold at the 2008 Cup of Nice, and three German national medals.

== Personal life ==
Constanze Paulinus was born in Berlin, Germany. In mid-1993, following her parents' divorce, she moved with her mother and sister to North East England. She returned to Germany in August 2002, settling in Erfurt.

== Career ==
Paulinus began skating at age five and trained in Berlin until she was eight. After moving to the U.K., she was coached by Catherine Barker in Billingham, by Debbie and Simon Briggs in Sunderland and Dundee, and by Joy Sutcliff in Ayr and Nottingham. At the British Championships, Paulinus won silver on the novice level in the 2000–01 season and junior gold the following season. The National Ice Skating Association decided not to send her to the 2002 World Junior Championships, believing she was not ready.

In August 2002, Paulinus' parents sent her to Erfurt, Germany to train under Ilona Schindler. She began representing her birth country internationally after sitting out the mandatory two years. She received two ISU Junior Grand Prix assignments in 2004, finishing fourth in Germany and eighth in Serbia. She also competed on the senior level, winning the silver medal at the 2004 Bofrost Cup on Ice.

In the 2005–06 season, Paulinus was invited to a senior Grand Prix event, the 2005 Skate America, where she finished seventh. She switched coaches in May 2007, joining Karin Hendschke-Raddatz in Berlin. In 2008–09, she won three international medals — gold at the Cup of Nice, bronze at the NRW Trophy, and bronze at the Challenge Cup — and silver at the German Championships.

Paulinus did not compete in the 2009–10 season due to foot surgery in November and hip surgery in December 2009. She retired from competition after placing fifth at the 2011 German Championships.

== Programs ==
Season	Short program	Free skating
2005–06	A La Folie by Michael Nyman	Chariots of Fire by Vangelis
2004–05	A La Folie by Michael Nyman	Amen by Armand Amar

== Competitive highlights ==
GP: Grand Prix; JGP: Junior Grand Prix

International
Event	00–01 (UK)	01–02 (UK)	02–03 (GER)	03–04 (GER)	04–05 (GER)	05–06 (GER)	06–07 (GER)	07–08 (GER)	08–09 (GER)	10–11 (GER)
GP Skate America						7th				
Bofrost Cup					2nd					
Challenge Cup									3rd	
Cup of Nice									1st	
Golden Spin								10th		8th
Montfort Cup				2nd						
Nebelhorn Trophy					11th	9th	8th	10th	12th	
Nepela Memorial								10th		
NRW Trophy									3rd	10th
Universiade									13th	
International: Junior and novice
JGP Germany					4th					
JGP Serbia					8th					
Mladost Trophy		5th J								
National
German Champ.			13th	3rd	WD	5th	3rd	5th	2nd	5th
British Champ.	2nd N	1st J								
Levels: N = Novice; J = Junior level; WD = Withdrew; Did not compete in the 2009–10 season
