= Chen Xizi =

Chinese figure skater

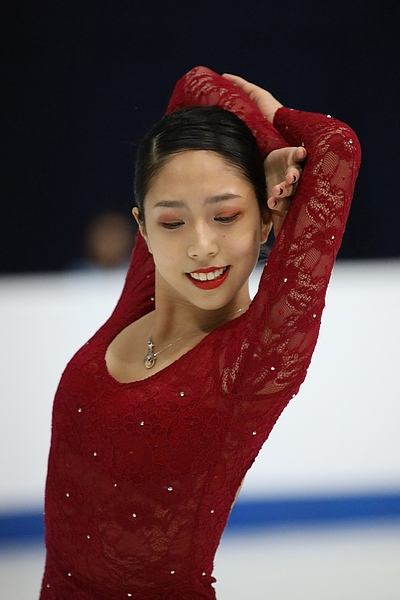

Personal information
- Native name: 陈溪梓
- Full name: Chen Xizi
- Born: 16 November 2001 (age 24) Harbin, China
- Home town: Harbin
- Height: 1.62 m (5 ft 4 in)

Figure skating career
- Country: China
- Partner: Xing Jianing (2018-2024)
- Coach: Zheng Xun
- Began skating: 2008
Medal record
Representing China
Figure skating: Ice Dance

Chen Xizi
- Simplified Chinese: 陈溪梓
- Traditional Chinese: 陳溪梓
Transcriptions
Standard Mandarin
- Hanyu Pinyin: Chén Xīzǐ

Chen Xizi (Chinese: 陈溪梓; pinyin: Chén Xīzǐ; born 16 November 2001) is a Chinese ice dancer. With former partner, Xing Jianing, she is the 2022 Chinese champion.

== Programs ==
=== With Xing ===
Season	Short dance	Free dance	Exhibition
2023–24	Get Down on It; Cherish; Celebration by Kool & the Gang choreo. by Zachary Donohue, Pascal Denis, Denis Samokhin, Maria Borovikova	Phantom’s Drama; Angel of Music by Roberto Danova choreo. by Zachary Donohue, Pascal Denis, Denis Samokhin, Maria Borovikova	Favo De Mel (from Rio 2) by Milton Nascimento; The Dance (from The Crimson Wing: Mystery of the Flamingos) by The Cinematic Orchestra
2022–23	Cha Cha: Are You Ready; Rhumba: Cuando Pienso En Ti; Samba: Latin Music	The Young Victoria; The First Waltz; The King's Birthday by Ilan Eshkeri	
2019–20	The Sound of Music Live!; Do-Re-Mi performed by Grace Rundhaug; Sixteen Going on Seventeen performed by Ariane Rinehart choreo. by Pascal Denis	They Don't Care About Us by Michael Jackson; Imagine by John Lennon performed by Glee Cast choreo. by Pascal Denis	
2018–19	Tango: La cumparsita by Gerardo Matos Rodríguez performed by Jamie White, Zheng Xun	Caught Out in the Rain by Beth Hart; Another One Bites the Dust by Queen choreo. by Jamie White, Zheng Xun	

== Competitive highlights ==
- GP – Event of the ISU Grand Prix Series
- JGP – Event of the ISU Junior Grand Prix Series
- CS – Event of the ISU Challenger Series

=== Ice dance with Xing Jianing ===
Competition placements at senior level
Season	2017–18	2022–23	2023–24
World Championships		25th	30th
Four Continents Championships			12th
Chinese Championships	7th	1st	1st
GP Cup of China			8th
Santa Claus Cup		5th	
Shanghai Trophy			5th

Competition placements at junior level
Season	2018–19	2019–20
World Junior Championships	24th	
Chinese Championships		1st
JGP Austria	11th	
JGP Canada	10th	
JGP France		13th
JGP Italy		11th
Mentor Cup	15th	
Russian-Chinese Winter Youth Games	4th	

== Detailed results ==
Small medals for short program and free skating are awarded only at ISU Championships. At team events, medals are awarded for team results only. ISU personal bests are highlighted in bold.

=== With Xing ===
2023–24 season
Date	Event	SP	FS	Total
18–24 March 2024	2024 World Championships	30; 58.80	-	30; 58.80
30 January–4 February, 2024	2024 Four Continents Championships	12; 61.10	11; 96.47	12; 157.57
22-24 December 2023	2023 Chinese Championships	1; 67.96	1; 97.64	1; 165.60
10–12 November 2023	2023 Cup of China	8; 62.05	8; 97.67	8; 159.72
3–5 October 2023	2023 Shanghai Trophy	5; 63.98	5; 91.01	5; 154.99
2022–23 season
Date	Event	SP	FS	Total
20–26 March 2023	2023 Worlds Championships	25; 58.12	-	25; 58.12
11–13 January 2023	2022 Chinese Championships	1; 67.23	1; 100.48	1; 167.71
28 November–4 December 2022	2022 Santa Claus Cup	1; 67.23	1; 100.48	1; 167.71
