= Zhang Siyang =

Chinese pair skater

Personal information
- Native name: 张思阳
- Full name: Zhang Siyang
- Born: 4 February 2005 (age 21) Qiqihar, China
- Height: 1.55 m (5 ft 1 in)

Figure skating career
- Country: China
- Partner: Jia Ziqi; Yang Yongchao [2022-2024]
- Coach: Song Lun
- Began skating: 2009

Zhang Siyang (simplified Chinese: 张思阳; traditional Chinese: 張思陽; pinyin: Zhāng Sīyáng; born 4 February 2005) is a Chinese pair skater. With partner Yang Yongchao, she is the 2022 Chinese nationals pairs skating champion.

== Personal life ==
Zhang was born on 4 February, 2005 in Qiqihar, China.

In addition to figure skating, Zhang also enjoys playing badminton and swimming.

== Singles skating career ==
Zhang began figure skating in 2009.

=== 2018–19 season ===
Debuting at the 2019 Chinese Championships, Zhang placed seventeenth.

=== 2019–20 season ===
Zhang did not compete during this season.

=== 2020–21 season ===
Due to the ongoing COVID-19 pandemic, a large number of modifications were made to the Grand Prix structure. Thus at the 2020 Cup of China, only skaters training China were invited to compete at the event. As a result, Zhang was assigned to compete there, where she finished fourth.

== Pairs skating career ==
=== 2022–23 season ===
For the 2022-23 figure skating season, Zhang switched to pairs skating, teaming up with Yang Yongchao. The pair debuted internationally at the 2022 CS Golden Spin of Zagreb, where they placed seventh.

At the 2022 Chinese Championships, the pair won the gold medal. With this result, the pair were selected to compete at the 2023 Four Continents Championships and the 2023 World Championships. At the 2023 Four Continents Championships in Colorado Springs, Colorado, the pair finished eighth.

Two weeks prior to the 2023 World Championships in Saitama, Japan, Zhang suffered a bad fall in practice and had to get twelve stitches in her chin. At the World Championships, the pair managed to qualify for the free program segment of the competition by placing twentieth in the short program. In the free skate, the pair placed seventeenth and moved up to seventeenth-place overall.

=== 2023-24 season ===
Zhang/Yang began the season at the Shanghai Trophy, where they won the bronze medal. They were invited to make their ISU Grand Prix debut at the 2023 Cup of China, where they finished in fifth place. At the 2023 Chinese Figure Skating Championships in December, they won bronze.

=== 2024-2025 season ===
Zhang was suspended beginning 19 September for two years due to an anti-doping violation.

== Programs ==
=== With Yang ===
Season	Short program	Free skating	Exhibition
2023–2024	Wu Shu (Wu Kong) by Gregory Tan, Iliya Zaki choreo. by Misha Ge	If Came the Hour by Secret Garden & Tommy Körberg choreo. by Misha Ge, Yura Min	365 days of missing you （想你的三百六十五天） by Coco Lee（李玟） choreo. by Misha Ge; You Are the Reason by Calum Scott & Leona Lewis
2022–2023	Saturday Night Fever: Stayin' Alive; You Should Be Dancing by Bee Gees, Walter Taieb choreo. by Elvin Wong	Les Misérables: Les Misérables performed by Royal Philharmonic Orchestra; I Dreamed a Dream performed by Boston Pops and John Williams; Epilogue by Claude-Michel Schönberg choreo. by Elvin Wong	Toca-Toca by Fly Project; We No Speak Americano by Yolanda Be Cool and DCUP

=== As a singles skater ===
Season	Short program	Free skating
2020-2021	Disney Princess Medley by May J. and Emiri Miyamoto choreo. by Elvin Wong	River Flows in You by Yiruma; Every Drop of Rain by David Garrett ft. Li Yijun choreo. by Elvin Wong

== Competitive highlights ==
GP: Grand Prix; CS: Challenger Series; JGP: Junior Grand Prix

=== Pairs ===
==== With Yang ====
International
Event	22–23	23–24
Worlds	17th	
Four Continents	8th	10th
GP Cup of China		5th
CS Golden Spin of Zagreb	7th	
Shanghai Trophy		3rd
National
Chinese Champ.	1st	3rd
Chinese Champ. Comp	1st	
WD = Withdrew; C = Event cancelled

=== As a singles skater ===
International
Event	18-19	19-20	20-21
Cup of China			4th
National
Event	18-19	19-20	20-21
Chinese Champ.	17th		
WD = Withdrew; C = Event cancelled

== Detailed results ==
=== With Yang ===
Current personal best scores are highlighted in bold.

**2023–24 season**
Date	Event	SP	FS	Total
30 January-4 February, 2024	2024 Four Continents Championships	10; 55.70	10; 101.62	10; 157.32
22-24 December, 2023	2023 Chinese Championships	3; 60.48	2; 107.89	3; 168.37
10–12 November, 2023	2023 Cup of China	5; 58.71	6; 102.94	5; 161.65
3-5 October, 2023	2023 Shanghai Trophy	4; 56.09	2; 117.48	3; 173.57
2022–23 season
Date	Event	SP	FS	Total
22–26 March 2023	2023 World Championships	20; 50.32	17; 97.91	17; 148.23
7–12 February 2023	2023 Four Continents Championships	8; 56.10	8; 97.66	8; 153.76
11–13 January 2023	2022 Chinese Championships	8; 56.10	8; 97.66	8; 153.76
7–10 December 2022	2022 CS Golden Spin of Zagreb	8; **56.44**	5; **104.89**	7; **161.33**

=== Singles skating ===
2020–21 season
Date	Event	SP	FS	Total
6–8 November 2020	2020 Cup of China	4; 39.80	3; 88.40	4; 128.20
2018–19 season
29–30 December 2018	2019 Chinese Championships	15; 36.16	18; 70.57	17; 106.73
