= Li Xuantong =

Chinese figure skater (born 2007)

Personal information
- Native name: 李宣潼
- Full name: Li Xuantong
- Born: 18 February 2007 (age 19) Harbin, China
- Home town: Harbin
- Height: 1.72 m (5 ft 7 1/2 in)

Figure skating career
- Country: China
- Coach: Zheng Xun
- Began skating: 2011
Medal record
Representing China
Figure skating: Ice Dance

Li Xuantong
- Simplified Chinese: 李宣潼
- Traditional Chinese: 李宣潼
Transcriptions
Standard Mandarin
- Hanyu Pinyin: Lǐ Xuāntóng

Li Xuantong (Chinese: 李宣潼; pinyin: Lǐ Xuāntóng; born 18 February 2007) is a Chinese ice dancer. Along with partner Wang Xinkang, she is the 2022 Chinese National Championships silver medalist.

== Career (With Wang) ==
=== Junior career ===
==== 2022–23 season ====
Li competed in the junior division of the 2022 Santa Claus cup, finishing in 4th place with a score of 134.45. Later in the Chinese junior figure skating championships, Li/Wang ranked second, after losing to Lin Yufei/Gao Zijian. He and Li participated in the 2023 Junior worlds championships, where they placed 22nd after the Rhythm Dance and did not qualify for the Free Dance.

==== 2023-24 season ====
Li/Wang was assigned to compete at the JGP Austria and Osaka events.

=== Senior career ===
==== 2022–23 season ====
Li competed in the senior division of the 2022 Santa Claus cup, and finished in 7th place with a score of 148.09. She and Wang took the 2nd place at the 2022 Chinese Championships, after losing to another Harbin pair by 6.65 marks. Wang/Li are assigned to compete in the 2022/23 Chinese Figure Skating Champions Championships, which is scheduled to be held in Qingdao from 12 to 13 April 2023.

== Programs ==
Season	Short dance	Free dance	Exhibition
2023-24	Let's Dance by David Bowie; Love Of My Life; Another One Bites the Dust by Queen Senior Level; Smooth Criminal; Man In The Mirror; Bad by Michael Jackson Junior Level	Grass (Shenjun); Jaha by Jaha Orchestra	
2022–23	Mambo: Sweet Like Cola; Rhumba: God is a Woman; Mambo: Mambo Mambo Senior Level; Tango: Farewell to San Ricardo, Tango, The Puss Suite Junior Level	Harry Potter soundtrack: Book II and the Escape from the Dursleys; Introducing Colin; Reunion of Friends by John Williams	

== Competitive highlights ==
With Wang

International
Event	22–23	23–24
Four Continents	WD	16th
Santa Claus Cup	7th	
International: Junior
Junior Worlds	22nd	
JGP Japan		9th
JGP Austria		10th
Santa Claus Cup	4th	
Trophée Nice		4th
National
National games		1st J
Chinese Champ.	2nd J	2nd J
TBD = Assigned; WD = Withdrew; C = Event cancelled Levels: J = Junior

== Detailed results ==
Small medals for short program and free skating are awarded only at ISU Championships. At team events, medals are awarded for team results only. ISU personal bests are highlighted in bold.

=== Senior level ===
2023-24 season
Date	Event	SP	FS	Total
30 Jan. – 4 Feb., 2024	2024 Four Continents Championships	16; 46.48	22; **85.94**	20; **132.42**
10-11 August 2023	2023/2024 National Grand Prix; Hulunbuir leg	5; 59.16	3; 97.18	4; 156.34
2022–23 season
Date	Event	SP	FS	Total
7–12 February 2023	2023 Four Continents Championships	–	–	WD
11–13 January 2023	2022 Chinese Championships	2; 64.13	2; 96.93	2; 161.06
28 November – 4 December 2022	2022 Santa Claus Cup	5; 58.37	8; 89.72	7; 148.09

=== Junior level ===
2023-24 season
Date	Event	SP	FS	Total
18-19 January, 2024	National Winter Games	1; 62.75	1; 96.73	1; 159.48
19-21 September 2023	Trophy Metropole Nice Cote d' Azur of Figure Skating	5; 48.57	4; 75.74	4; 124.31
14-16 September 2023	2023 JGP Osaka	8; 49.24	8; 79.93	8; 129.17
1-2 September 2023	2023 JGP Linz	14; 42.80	9; 75.75	10; 118.55
26-27 July 2023	2023/2024 National Grand Prix; Beijing leg	2; 53.42	1; 91.08	1; 144.50
2022–23 season
Date	Event	SP	FS	Total
27 February – 5 March 2023	World Juniors	22; **49.25**	DNQ	22; 49.25
28 November – 4 December 2022	2022 Santa Claus Cup	4; 55.42	5; 79.03	4; 134.45
