= National Winter Games of China =

Chinese national winter multi-sport event

The National Winter Games of China is a nationwide Chinese winter sports competition typically held every 4 to 5 years in conjunction with the National Games of China. The 2016 games featured 1,388 participants from 52 delegations, including Hong Kong and Macau. The 2020 winter games, which were to take place in February in Inner Mongolia, have been postponed to 2024 due to the global COVID-19 pandemic.

== Editions ==
Year	Games	Host	Date
1959	1st	Jilin and Harbin	1–5 and 10–20 February 1959
1965	2nd	Jilin (canceled)	—N/a
1976	3rd	Harbin and Shangzhi	21–26 January 1976
1979	4th	Shangzhi, Ürümqi, and Beijing	14–20 February, 4–9 March, and 8–17 September 1979
1983	5th	Harbin	12–23 March 1983
1987	6th	Jilin	8–17 March 1987
1991	7th	Harbin	2–9 February 1991
1995	8th	Jilin	14–24 January 1995
1999	9th	Changchun	10–19 January 1999
2003	10th	Harbin	5–18 January 2003
2008	11th	Qiqihar	18–28 January 2008
2012	12th	Changchun and |Jilin	3–13 January 2012
2016	13th	Ürümqi and Changji Hui Autonomous Prefecture	20–31 January 2016
2024	14th	Hulunbuir	originally scheduled to be held from 16–26 February 2020, rescheduled to 17–27 February 2024
2028	15th	Shenyang and Fushun	
