= 2004 Cup of China =

- Type: Grand Prix
- Date: November 11 – 14
- Season: 2004–05
- Location: Beijing
- Host: Chinese Skating Association
- Venue: Capital Gymnasium

Champions
- Men's singles: (Canada) Jeffrey Buttle
- Ladies' singles: (Russia) Irina Slutskaya
- Pairs: (China) Shen Xue / Zhao Hongbo
- Ice dance: (United States) Tanith Belbin / Benjamin Agosto
- Previous: 2003 Cup of China
- Next: 2005 Cup of China
- Previous Grand Prix: 2004 NHK Trophy
- Next Grand Prix: 2004 Trophée Éric Bompard

The 2004 Cup of China was the fourth event of six in the 2004–05 ISU Grand Prix of Figure Skating, a senior-level international invitational competition series. It was held at the Capital Gymnasium in Beijing on November 11–14. Medals were awarded in the disciplines of men's singles, ladies' singles, pair skating, and ice dancing. Skaters earned points toward qualifying for the 2004–05 Grand Prix Final. The compulsory dance was the Golden Waltz.

== Results ==
=== Men ===
Rank	Name	Nation	Total points	SP		FS	
1	Jeffrey Buttle	Canada	211.20	1	76.00	1	135.20
2	Li Chengjiang	China	197.15	2	69.75	2	127.40
3	Stefan Lindemann	Germany	188.80	3	62.70	3	126.10
4	Zhang Min	China	187.30	4	62.28	4	125.02
5	Song Lun	China	179.64	5	60.88	5	118.76
6	Scott Smith	United States	168.25	8	57.45	6	110.80
7	Ivan Dinev	Bulgaria	159.59	7	58.15	7	101.44
8	Matthew Savoie	United States	150.20	6	59.44	8	90.76
9	Silvio Smalun	Germany	144.61	10	55.73	9	88.88
10	Marc Andre Craig	Canada	142.67	9	56.69	10	85.98
WD	Tomáš Verner	Czech Republic		11	40.32		

=== Ladies ===
Rank	Name	Nation	Total points	SP		FS	
1	Irina Slutskaya	Russia	177.80	1	62.96	1	114.84
2	Viktoria Volchkova	Russia	154.16	2	53.14	3	101.02
3	Joannie Rochette	Canada	152.12	5	49.44	2	102.68
4	Miki Ando	Japan	150.32	4	49.76	4	100.56
5	Elina Kettunen	Finland	138.40	6	47.68	5	90.72
6	Jenna McCorkell	United Kingdom	131.08	7	47.36	7	83.72
7	Mira Leung	Canada	128.90	9	44.78	6	84.12
8	Angela Nikodinov	United States	124.50	3	49.82	11	74.68
9	Fang Dan	China	121.20	8	44.98	10	76.22
10	Liu Yan	China	120.24	10	39.08	8	81.16
11	Yukari Nakano	Japan	116.94	11	38.76	9	78.18

=== Pairs ===
Rank	Name	Nation	Total points	SP		FS	
1	Shen Xue / Zhao Hongbo	China	193.54	1	66.38	1	127.16
2	Zhang Dan / Zhang Hao	China	175.02	2	62.28	2	112.74
3	Valérie Marcoux / Craig Buntin	Canada	164.86	3	61.84	3	103.02
4	Ding Yang / Ren Zhongfei	China	146.26	5	48.90	4	97.36
5	Tiffany Scott / Philip Dulebohn	United States	133.04	6	47.96	5	85.08
6	Eva-Maria Fitze / Rico Rex	Germany	126.40	4	51.70	7	74.70
7	Marina Aganina / Artem Knyazev	Uzbekistan	116.70	8	41.50	6	75.20
8	Marylin Pla / Yannick Bonheur	France	113.36	7	41.52	8	71.84
9	Diana Rennik / Aleksei Saks	Estonia	102.94	9	34.92	9	68.02

=== Ice dancing ===
Rank	Name	Nation	Total points	CD		OD		FD	
1	Tanith Belbin / Benjamin Agosto	United States	210.28	1	40.07	1	64.93	1	105.28
2	Galit Chait / Sergei Sakhnovski	Israel	204.42	3	37.77	2	63.07	2	103.58
3	Marie-France Dubreuil / Patrice Lauzon	Canada	199.44	2	39.37	3	60.99	3	99.08
4	Oksana Domnina / Maxim Shabalin	Russia	179.70	4	32.54	4	54.38	4	92.78
5	Kristin Fraser / Igor Lukanin	Azerbaijan	160.72	5	30.34	5	46.14	5	84.24
6	Nóra Hoffmann / Attila Elek	Hungary	149.86	6	29.84	7	43.79	6	76.23
7	Nathalie Péchalat / Fabian Bourzat	France	146.39	7	29.52	6	44.34	7	72.53
8	Anastasia Grebenkina / Vazgen Azrojan	Armenia	139.17	9	26.51	8	41.18	8	71.48
9	Yang Fang / Gao Chongbo	China	131.80	8	27.27	9	40.30	9	64.23
10	Yu Xiaoyang / Wang Chen	China	126.27	10	24.49	10	37.90	10	63.88
11	Qi Jia / Sun Xu	China	112.33	11	22.55	11	33.70	11	56.08
