= 2003 Cup of China =

- Type: Grand Prix
- Date: November 6 – 9
- Season: 2003–04
- Location: Beijing
- Host: Chinese Skating Association
- Venue: Capital Gymnasium

Champions
- Men's singles: (United States) Timothy Goebel
- Ladies' singles: (Ukraine) Elena Liashenko
- Pairs: (China) Shen Xue / Zhao Hongbo
- Ice dance: (Russia) Tatiana Navka / Roman Kostomarov
- Previous: New
- Next: 2004 Cup of China
- Previous Grand Prix: 2003 Skate Canada International
- Next Grand Prix: 2003 Trophée Lalique

The 2003 Cup of China was third event of six in the 2003–04 ISU Grand Prix of Figure Skating. It was held at the Capital Gymnasium in Beijing on November 6–9. Medals were awarded in the disciplines of men's singles, ladies' singles, pair skating, and ice dancing. Skaters earned points toward qualifying for the 2003–04 Grand Prix Final. The compulsory dance was the Yankee Polka.

This was the Cup of China's inaugural year.

== Results ==
=== Men ===
Rank	Name	Nation	Total points	SP		FS	
1	Timothy Goebel	United States	205.30	2	67.70	1	137.60
2	Brian Joubert	France	199.84	4	65.67	2	134.17
3	Li Chengjiang	China	196.24	3	67.30	3	128.94
4	Gao Song	China	185.90	1	70.25	8	115.65
5	Emanuel Sandhu	Canada	185.23	7	59.83	4	125.40
6	Ilia Klimkin	Russia	183.80	8	59.60	5	124.20
7	Nicholas Young	Canada	178.87	6	61.47	7	117.40
8	Scott Smith	United States	175.06	10	53.05	6	122.01
9	Zhang Min	China	173.79	5	64.94	10	108.85
10	Andrejs Vlascenko	Germany	171.17	9	57.63	9	113.54
11	Vincent Restencourt	France	130.78	11	43.05	11	87.73

=== Ladies ===
Rank	Name	Nation	Total points	SP		FS	
1	Elena Liashenko	Ukraine	153.54	7	51.18	1	102.36
2	Yoshie Onda	Japan	148.79	3	56.48	2	92.31
3	Fumie Suguri	Japan	143.67	1	60.28	5	83.39
4	Ann Patrice McDonough	United States	139.97	2	57.00	6	82.97
5	Tatiana Basova	Russia	138.03	5	54.24	4	83.79
6	Amber Corwin	United States	133.97	6	51.56	7	82.41
7	Viktoria Volchkova	Russia	132.65	4	55.70	9	76.95
8	Fang Dan	China	126.15	8	48.68	8	77.47
9	Jennifer Robinson	Canada	125.96	10	41.68	3	84.28
10	Liu Yan	China	116.20	9	42.28	10	73.92
11	Anastasia Gimazetdinova	Uzbekistan	94.83	11	34.54	11	60.29

=== Pairs ===
Rank	Name	Nation	Total points	SP		FS	
1	Shen Xue / Zhao Hongbo	China	189.28	1	63.46	1	125.82
2	Pang Qing / Tong Jian	China	179.70	2	60.64	2	119.06
3	Maria Petrova / Alexei Tikhonov	Russia	165.58	3	57.92	3	107.66
4	Dorota Zagorska / Mariusz Siudek	Poland	158.59	4	56.44	4	102.15
5	Rena Inoue / John Baldwin Jr.	United States	147.84	5	50.10	5	97.74
6	Nicole Nönnig / Matthias Bleyer	Germany	130.92	8	41.48	6	89.44
7	Tatiana Volosozhar / Petr Kharchenko	Ukraine	129.85	7	44.30	7	85.55
8	Ding Yang / Ren Zongfei	China	126.37	6	48.28	8	78.09
9	Veronika Havlíčková / Karel Štefl	Czech Republic	115.90	9	39.36	9	76.54
10	Julia Beloglazova / Andrei Bekh	Ukraine	111.92	10	37.60	10	74.32

=== Ice dancing ===
Rank	Name	Nation	Total points	CD		OD		FD	
1	Tatiana Navka / Roman Kostomarov	Russia	211.36	1	41.52	1	60.38	1	109.46
2	Elena Grushina / Ruslan Goncharov	Ukraine	194.57	2	38.23	3	56.72	2	99.62
3	Isabelle Delobel / Olivier Schoenfelder	France	187.77	3	37.39	2	57.57	3	92.81
4	Melissa Gregory / Denis Petukhov	United States	163.10	4	32.66	4	46.96	4	83.48
5	Josée Piché / Pascal Denis	Canada	149.07	5	30.18	5	43.40	5	75.49
6	Natalia Gudina / Alexei Beletski	Israel	138.41	6	29.52	7	38.28	7	70.61
7	Nathalie Péchalat / Fabian Bourzat	France	137.14	7	28.21	6	38.29	6	70.64
8	Christina Beier / William Beier	Germany	126.07	8	27.28	9	33.03	8	65.76
9	Yang Fang / Gao Chongbo	China	118.30	9	26.97	10	31.63	9	59.70
10	Alessia Aureli / Andrea Vaturi	Italy	116.32	10	25.15	8	34.15	10	57.02
11	Yu Xiaoyang / Wang Chen	China	104.38	11	22.76	11	28.16	11	53.46
12	Wang Jiayue / Meng Fei	China	98.43	12	22.31	12	25.68	12	50.44
