= 2004 Four Continents Figure Skating Championships =

- Type: ISU Championship
- Date: January 19 – 25
- Season: 2003–04
- Location: Hamilton, Canada
- Venue: Copps Coliseum

Champions
- Men's singles: (Canada) Jeffrey Buttle
- Ladies' singles: (Japan) Yukina Ota
- Pairs: (China) Pang Qing / Tong Jian
- Ice dance: (United States) Tanith Belbin / Benjamin Agosto
- Previous: 2003 Four Continents Championships
- Next: 2005 Four Continents Championships

The 2004 Four Continents Figure Skating Championships was an international figure skating competition in the 2003–04 season. It was held at the Copps Coliseum in Hamilton, Canada on January 19–25. Medals were awarded in the disciplines of men's singles, ladies' singles, pair skating, and ice dancing. The compulsory dance was the Yankee Polka.

== Medals table ==
Rank	Nation	Gold	Silver	Bronze	Total
1	Canada (CAN)	1	3	2	6
2	China (CHN)	1	1	0	2
3	United States (USA)	1	0	2	3
4	Japan (JPN)	1	0	0	1
Totals (4 entries)		4	4	4	12

== Results ==
=== Men ===
Rank	Name	Nation	TFP	SP	FS
1	Jeffrey Buttle	Canada	1.5	1	1
2	Emanuel Sandhu	Canada	3.5	3	2
3	Evan Lysacek	United States	5.0	4	3
4	Ryan Jahnke	United States	7.5	5	5
5	Yamato Tamura	Japan	8.0	2	7
6	Daisuke Takahashi	Japan	8.5	9	4
7	Ben Ferreira	Canada	11.0	10	6
8	Gao Song	China	12.0	8	8
9	Ma Xiaodong	China	12.0	6	9
10	Song Lun	China	14.5	7	11
11	Ryan Bradley	United States	15.5	11	10
12	Lee Dong-whun	South Korea	18.0	12	12
13	Bradley Santer	Australia	19.5	13	13
14	Daniel Harries	Australia	22.0	16	14
15	Stuart Beckingham	Australia	22.0	14	15
16	Gareth Echardt	South Africa	24.5	17	16
17	Tristan Thode	New Zealand	25.5	15	18
18	Miguel Angel Moyron	Mexico	27.5	21	17
19	Humberto Contreras	Mexico	28.5	19	19
20	Justin Pietersen	South Africa	29.0	18	20
21	Adrian Alvarado	Mexico	31.0	20	21
22	Konrad Giering	South Africa	33.0	22	22
WD	Takeshi Honda	Japan			

=== Ladies ===
Rank	Name	Nation	TFP	SP	FS
1	Yukina Ota	Japan	3.5	3	2
2	Cynthia Phaneuf	Canada	5.0	8	1
3	Amber Corwin	United States	5.5	1	5
4	Joannie Rochette	Canada	6.0	6	3
5	Jennifer Robinson	Canada	6.0	4	4
6	Yukari Nakano	Japan	8.5	5	6
7	Angela Nikodinov	United States	10.0	2	9
8	Yoshie Onda	Japan	10.5	7	7
9	Liu Yan	China	13.0	10	8
10	Joanne Carter	Australia	14.5	9	10
11	Miriam Manzano	Australia	17.0	12	11
12	Fang Dan	China	17.5	11	12
13	Jennifer Don	United States	19.5	13	13
14	Zhang Fan	China	21.0	14	14
15	Michelle Cantu	Mexico	23.0	16	15
16	Shirene Human	South Africa	23.5	15	16
17	Park Bit-na	South Korea	26.5	17	18
18	Anastasia Gimazetdinova	Uzbekistan	27.0	20	17
19	Sarah-Yvonne Prytula	Australia	28.0	18	19
20	Diane Chen	Chinese Taipei	30.5	19	21
21	Gladys Orozco	Mexico	32.0	24	20
22	Lee Sun-bin	South Korea	33.5	23	22
23	Jenna-Anne Buys	South Africa	33.5	21	23
24	Abigail Pietersen	South Africa	35.0	22	24
Free Skating Not Reached
25	Cho Eun-byul	South Korea		25	
26	Anny Hou	Chinese Taipei		26	

=== Pairs ===
Rank	Name	Nation	TFP	SP	FS
1	Pang Qing / Tong Jian	China	1.5	1	1
2	Zhang Dan / Zhang Hao	China	3.0	2	2
3	Valérie Marcoux / Craig Buntin	Canada	4.5	3	3
4	Rena Inoue / John Baldwin, Jr.	United States	6.0	4	4
5	Anabelle Langlois / Patrice Archetto	Canada	7.5	5	5
6	Ding Yang / Ren Zhongfei	China	9.0	6	6
7	Kathryn Orscher / Garrett Lucash	United States	10.5	7	7
8	Tiffany Scott / Philip Dulebohn	United States	12.0	8	8
9	Elizabeth Putnam / Sean Wirtz	Canada	13.5	9	9
10	Marina Aganina / Artem Knyazev	Uzbekistan	15.0	10	10

=== Ice dancing ===
Rank	Name	Nation	TFP	CD	OD	FD
1	Tanith Belbin / Benjamin Agosto	United States	2.4	2	1	1
2	Marie-France Dubreuil / Patrice Lauzon	Canada	3.6	1	2	2
3	Megan Wing / Aaron Lowe	Canada	6.6	3	4	3
4	Melissa Gregory / Denis Petukhov	United States	7.4	4	3	4
5	Nozomi Watanabe / Akiyuki Kido	Japan	10.0	5	5	5
6	Yang Fang / Gao Chongbo	China	12.0	6	6	6
7	Josée Piché / Pascal Denis	Canada	14.0	7	7	7
8	Loren Galler-Rabinowitz / David Mitchell	United States	16.0	8	8	8
9	Nakako Tsuzuki / Kenji Miyamoto	Japan	18.0	9	9	9
10	Yu Xiaoyang / Wang Chen	China	20.0	10	10	10
11	Qi Jia / Sun Xu	China	23.0	11	11	12
12	Natalie Buck / Trent Nelson-Bond	Australia	23.4	13	12	11
13	Danika Bourne / Alexander Pavlov	Australia	25.6	12	13	13
