= 2003 NHK Trophy =

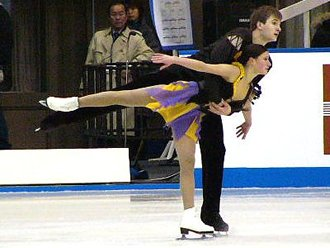
- Type: Grand Prix
- Date: November 26 – 30
- Season: 2003–04
- Location: Asahikawa
- Venue: Asahikawa Taisetsu Ice Arena

Champions
- Men's singles: (Canada) Jeffrey Buttle
- Ladies' singles: (Japan) Fumie Suguri
- Pairs: (Russia) Maria Petrova / Alexei Tikhonov
- Ice dance: (Bulgaria) Albena Denkova / Maxim Staviski
- Previous: 2002 NHK Trophy
- Next: 2004 NHK Trophy
- Previous GP: 2003 Cup of Russia
- Next GP: 2003–04 Grand Prix Final

The 2003 NHK Trophy was the final event of six in the 2003–04 ISU Grand Prix of Figure Skating. It was held at the Asahikawa Taisetsu Ice Arena in Asahikawa on November 27–30. Medals were awarded in the disciplines of men's singles, ladies' singles, pair skating, and ice dancing. Skaters earned points toward qualifying for the 2003–04 Grand Prix Final. The compulsory dance was the Yankee Polka.

== Results ==
=== Men ===
Rank	Name	Nation	Total points	SP		FS	
1	Jeffrey Buttle	Canada	211.00	2	71.70	1	139.30
2	Timothy Goebel	United States	205.51	1	73.65	2	131.86
3	Gao Song	China	192.89	5	64.29	3	128.60
4	Brian Joubert	France	191.16	4	64.80	5	126.36
5	Alexander Abt	Russia	188.86	3	67.46	7	121.40
6	Ben Ferreira	Canada	188.83	7	62.15	4	126.68
7	Gheorge Chiper	Romania	186.09	10	60.55	6	125.54
8	Li Yunfei	China	181.19	6	63.97	8	117.22
9	Matthew Savoie	United States	179.02	8	62.02	9	117.00
10	Yamato Tamura	Japan	149.74	11	53.95	10	95.79
11	Kensuke Nakaniwa	Japan	145.29	9	61.85	11	83.44

=== Ladies ===
Rank	Name	Nation	Total points	SP		FS	
1	Fumie Suguri	Japan	165.52	2	57.94	1	107.58
2	Elena Liashenko	Ukraine	163.14	1	58.20	2	104.94
3	Yoshie Onda	Japan	154.42	3	56.38	3	98.04
4	Susanna Pöykiö	Finland	147.04	6	50.08	4	96.96
5	Jennifer Kirk	United States	140.08	5	51.36	5	88.72
6	Yukina Ota	Japan	133.79	7	47.72	6	86.07
7	Diána Póth	Hungary	130.37	4	52.24	10	78.13
8	Anne-Sophie Calvez	France	125.19	9	41.80	7	83.39
9	Fang Dan	China	123.74	8	42.00	9	81.74
10	Michelle Currie	Canada	123.70	10	41.06	8	82.64

=== Pairs ===
Rank	Name	Nation	Total points	SP		FS	
1	Maria Petrova / Alexei Tikhonov	Russia	181.96	1	63.24	1	118.72
2	Anabelle Langlois / Patrice Archetto	Canada	169.06	4	55.62	2	113.44
3	Dorota Zagorska / Mariusz Siudek	Poland	164.04	2	57.68	3	106.36
4	Rena Inoue / John Baldwin, Jr.	United States	158.88	3	57.28	4	101.60
5	Utako Wakamatsu / Jean-Sébastien Fecteau	Canada	141.46	5	51.00	5	90.46
6	Tatiana Volosozhar / Petr Kharchenko	Ukraine	129.31	6	44.68	7	84.63
7	Ding Yang / Ren Zhongfei	China	127.44	8	41.72	6	85.72
8	Milica Brozović / Vladimir Futas	Slovakia	119.76	7	42.16	8	77.60
9	Julia Beloglazova / Andrei Bekh	Ukraine	114.78	9	39.88	9	74.90
10	Marina Aganina / Artem Knyazev	Uzbekistan	105.04	10	37.76	10	67.28

=== Ice dancing ===
Rank	Name	Nation	Total points	CD		OD		FD	
1	Albena Denkova / Maxim Staviski	Bulgaria	207.51	1	39.59	2	60.63	1	107.29
2	Elena Grushina / Ruslan Goncharov	Ukraine	205.73	2	37.93	1	61.24	2	106.56
3	Galit Chait / Sergei Sakhnovski	Israel	194.08	4	35.69	4	54.90	3	103.49
4	Kati Winkler / René Lohse	Germany	193.01	3	37.18	3	60.32	4	95.51
5	Megan Wing / Aaron Lowe	Canada	167.44	5	32.18	5	48.82	5	86.44
6	Jana Khokhlova / Sergei Novitski	Russia	148.53	6	28.42	8	37.20	6	82.91
7	Loren Galler-Rabinowitz / David Mitchell	United States	145.04	7	27.04	6	44.24	7	73.76
8	Nozomi Watanabe / Akiyuki Kido	Japan	141.98	8	27.03	7	42.89	8	72.06
9	Julia Golovina / Oleg Voiko	Ukraine	129.83	11	24.13	10	36.67	9	69.03
10	Nakako Tsuzuki / Kenji Miyamoto	Japan	127.86	10	25.89	11	33.71	10	68.26
11	Yang Fang / Gao Chongbo	China	127.00	9	26.05	9	37.09	11	63.86
12	Jessica Huot / Juha Valkama	Finland	114.25	12	23.92	12	31.32	12	59.01
