= Figure skating at the 2017 Winter Universiade =

Figure skating at the XXVIII Winter Universiade
- Venue: Almaty Arena
- Dates: February 1–5, 2017

Figure skating at the 2017 Winter Universiade
- Type: Senior international
- Date: February 1 – 5
- Season: 2016–17
- Location: Almaty, Kazakhstan
- Venue: Almaty Arena
- Previous: 2015 Winter Universiade
- Next: 2019 Winter Universiade

Figure skating at the 2017 Winter Universiade was held on February 1–5 at the Almaty Arena in Almaty, Kazakhstan. Medals were awarded in men's singles, ladies' singles, and ice dancing.

== Regulations ==
Skaters who were born between 1 January 1989 and 31 December 1999 are eligible to compete at the Winter Universiade if they are registered as proceeding towards a degree or diploma at a university or similar institution, or obtained their academic degree or diploma in the year preceding the event. Each nation may send a maximum of three entries per discipline.

Maximum number of entries
Discipline	First round	FS / FD
Men	36	24
Ladies	36	24
Ice dance	25	20

== Medalists ==
Event	Gold	Silver	Bronze
Men's singles	(Kazakhstan) Denis Ten	(Japan) Keiji Tanaka	(Sweden) Alexander Majorov
Ladies' singles	(Russia) Elena Radionova	(Japan) Rin Nitaya	(Japan) Hinano Isobe
Ice dancing	(Ukraine) Oleksandra Nazarova / Maxim Nikitin	(Russia) Sofia Evdokimova / Egor Bazin	(Germany) Shari Koch / Christian Nüchtern

=== Withdrawn events ===
On 17 January, it was announced the cancellation of pairs competition in the figure skating due to the low number of entrants. Only two pairs from Russia were registered in the event, which forced the cancellation of the same, according to the rules of FISU.

== Medal table ==
Rank	Nation	Gold	Silver	Bronze	Total
1	Russia (RUS)	1	1	0	2
2	Kazakhstan (KAZ)	1	0	0	1
2	Ukraine (UKR)	1	0	0	1
4	Japan (JPN)	0	2	1	3
5	Germany (GER)	0	0	1	1
5	Sweden (SWE)	0	0	1	1
Totals (6 entries)		3	3	3	9

== Entries ==
Originally there were also a pairs' event but it was cancelled because it had only two entries, both Russian.

Country	Men	Ladies	Ice dancing
Austria	Mario-Rafael Ionian	Belinda Schonberger; Nina Larissa Wolfslast	
Belarus			Kristsina Kaunatskaia / Yuri Hulitski
China	Guan Yuhang; Liu Runqi	Li Jiayin; Zhao Ziquan	Chen Hong / Zhao Yan; Guo Yuzhu / Zhao Pengkun; Wang Xiaotong / Zhao Kaige
Czech Republic	Michal Brezina	Eliska Brezinova	Nicole Kuzmichova / Alexandr Sinicyn
Estonia	Samuel Koppel		
Finland	Bela Papp		Juulia Turkkila / Matthias Versluis
France	Simon Hocquaux; Romain Ponsart; Adrien Tesson		Mathilde Harold / Maël Demougeot
Germany		Maria Katharina Herceg; Nathalie Weinzierl	Shari Koch / Christian Nüchtern; Katharina Müller / Tim Dieck; Jennifer Urban / Benjamin Steffan
Greece		Dimitra Korri	
Hong Kong	Lee Harry Hau Yin		
Italy	Ivan Righini; Maurizio Zandron	Roberta Rodeghiero; Giada Russo	
Japan	Ryuju Hino; Sei Kawahara; Keiji Tanaka	Hinano Isobe; Mariko Kihara; Rin Nitaya	
Kazakhstan	Denis Ten; Abzal Rakimgaliyev; Artur Panikhin	Aiza Mambekova; Veronika Sheveleva; Zhansaya Adykhanova	
Kyrgyzstan		Kristina Bedrosova	
Lithuania		Inga Janulevičiūtė	
Mexico		Priscila Alavez Vega; Aislin Rosado Yanez	
Netherlands	Thomas Kennes; Michel Tsiba		
Russia	Andrei Lazukin; Artur Dmitriev Jr. Anton Shulepov	Alena Leonova; Elena Radionova; Elizaveta Tuktamysheva	Sofia Evdokimova / Egor Bazin; Vasilisa Davankova / Anton Shibnev; Maria Stavitskaia / Andrei Bagin
Slovakia	Michael Neuman; Marco Klepoch	Miroslava Hrinakova	
Slovenia		Dasa Grm	
South Korea	Kim Jin-seo; Lee Dongwon; Lee June-hyoung	Choi Hwi; Kim Haejin	
Sweden	Marcus Björk; Alexander Majorov; Ondrej Spiegl	Josefine Taljegard	
Switzerland		Jeromie Repond	
Chinese Taipei	Chih-I Tsao		
Thailand		Masinee Chayangkura	
Turkey	Burak Demirboga	Sıla Saygı	
United Kingdom	Charles Parry-Evans		
Ukraine	Ivan Pavlov; Vladyslav Pikhovych		Oleksandra Nazarova / Maxim Nikitin

== Results ==
=== Men ===
Rank	Name	Nation	Total points	SP		FS	
1	Denis Ten	Kazakhstan	266.97	1	94.91	1	172.06
2	Keiji Tanaka	Japan	252.09	2	89.05	3	163.04
3	Alexander Majorov	Sweden	246.56	6	81.01	2	165.55
4	Artur Dmitriev Jr.	Russia	237.82	3	87.18	7	150.64
5	Ivan Righini	Italy	235.47	5	82.28	5	153.19
6	Ryuju Hino	Japan	226.01	9	75.23	6	150.78
7	Michal Březina	Czech Republic	225.05	8	75.57	8	149.48
8	Kim Jin-seo	South Korea	220.22	14	66.81	4	153.41
9	Andrei Lazukin	Russia	220.00	4	84.74	12	135.26
10	Guan Yuhang	China	209.01	13	67.16	9	141.85
11	Romain Ponsart	France	207.17	15	66.25	10	140.92
12	Abzal Rakimgaliyev	Kazakhstan	204.23	11	68.25	11	135.98
13	Maurizio Zandron	Italy	203.00	10	69.71	13	133.29
14	Anton Shulepov	Russia	200.64	7	76.13	15	124.51
15	Ivan Pavlov	Ukraine	200.44	12	67.27	14	133.17
16	Lee June-hyoung	South Korea	182.53	16	65.08	16	117.45
17	Adrien Tesson	France	180.95	17	63.68	17	117.27
18	Chih-I Tsao	Chinese Taipei	174.71	21	58.13	18	116.58
19	Thomas Kennes	Netherlands	174.57	19	59.04	20	115.53
20	Sei Kawahara	Japan	173.86	23	57.93	19	115.93
21	Burak Demirboga	Turkey	169.04	24	56.33	21	112.71
22	Ondrej Spiegl	Sweden	163.48	22	58.02	22	105.46
23	Simon Hocquaux	France	161.08	18	59.15	23	101.93
24	Michael Neuman	Slovakia	155.61	20	58.24	24	97.37
Did not advance to free skating
25	Bela Papp	Finland	56.08	25	56.08	—N/a	
26	Charles Parry-Evans	United Kingdom	55.49	26	55.49	—N/a	
27	Liu Runqi	China	54.63	27	54.63	—N/a	
28	Artur Panikhin	Kazakhstan	54.11	28	54.11	—N/a	
29	Samuel Koppel	Estonia	53.52	29	53.52	—N/a	
30	Lee Dong won	South Korea	50.76	30	50.76	—N/a	
31	Marcus Björk	Sweden	47.69	31	47.69	—N/a	
32	Michel Tsiba	Netherlands	43.35	32	43.35	—N/a	
33	Lee Harry Hau Yin	Hong Kong	41.95	33	41.95	—N/a	
34	Vladyslav Pikhovych	Ukraine	40.02	34	40.02	—N/a	
35	Mario-Rafael Ionian	Austria	36.99	35	36.99	—N/a	
36	Marco Klepoch	Slovakia	36.53	36	36.53	—N/a	

=== Ladies ===
Rank	Name	Nation	Total points	SP		FS	
1	Elena Radionova	Russia	196.61	1	69.02	1	127.59
2	Rin Nitaya	Japan	187.18	3	61.90	2	125.28
3	Hinano Isobe	Japan	174.27	5	56.78	3	117.49
4	Elizaveta Tuktamysheva	Russia	171.68	2	69.01	6	102.67
5	Alena Leonova	Russia	171.06	6	54.69	4	116.37
6	Roberta Rodeghiero	Italy	161.20	4	59.03	7	102.17
7	Mariko Kihara	Japan	154.30	9	50.29	5	104.01
8	Zhao Ziquan	China	146.94	8	53.23	8	93.71
9	Maria Katharina Herceg	Germany	140.89	7	53.29	13	87.60
10	Dasa Grm	Slovenia	138.61	12	48.81	9	89.80
11	Eliška Březinová	Czech Republic	138.05	10	50.27	12	87.78
12	Giada Russo	Italy	132.65	14	44.49	11	88.16
13	Aiza Mambekova	Kazakhstan	131.94	16	42.41	10	89.53
14	Inga Janulevičiūtė	Lithuania	127.85	13	47.07	14	80.78
15	Josefine Taljegard	Sweden	121.47	15	42.96	15	78.51
16	Jeromie Repond	Switzerland	117.51	18	40.53	16	76.98
17	Li Jiayin	China	111.75	20	39.56	17	72.19
18	Belinda Schonberger	Austria	109.44	17	41.33	19	68.11
19	Sıla Saygı	Turkey	108.19	21	39.49	18	68.70
20	Choi Hwi	South Korea	99.77	19	39.74	22	60.03
21	Miroslava Hrinakova	Slovakia	97.46	22	33.32	20	64.14
22	Zhansaya Adykhanova	Kazakhstan	92.09	23	32.37	23	59.72
23	Veronika Sheveleva	Kazakhstan	90.82	24	30.66	21	60.16
WD	Kim Hae jin	South Korea		11	49.30		
Did not advance to free skating
25	Aislin Rosado Yanez	Mexico	28.66	25	28.66	—N/a	
26	Priscila Alavez Vega	Mexico	27.89	26	27.89	—N/a	
27	Nina Larissa Wolfslast	Austria	24.44	27	24.44	—N/a	
28	Dimitra Korri	Greece	21.37	28	21.37	—N/a	
29	Masinee Chayangkura	Thailand	17.62	29	17.62	—N/a	
30	Kristina Bedrosova	Kyrgyzstan	17.18	30	17.18	—N/a	

=== Ice dance ===
Rank	Name	Nation	Total points	SD		FD	
1	Oleksandra Nazarova / Maxim Nikitin	Ukraine	165.62	1	64.12	1	101.50
2	Sofia Evdokimova / Egor Bazin	Russia	156.96	2	63.96	2	93.00
3	Shari Koch / Christian Nüchtern	Germany	154.00	3	62.32	3	91.68
4	Katharina Müller / Tim Dieck	Germany	141.22	4	61.32	8	79.90
5	Vasilisa Davankova / Anton Shibnev	Russia	137.86	7	54.60	4	83.26
6	Chen Hong / Zhao Yan	China	137.24	5	55.02	5	82.22
7	Nicole Kuzmichova / Alexandr Sinicyn	Czech Republic	135.00	6	54.90	7	80.10
8	Juulia Turkkila / Matthias Versluis	Finland	130.12	8	50.60	9	79.52
9	Jennifer Urban / Benjamin Steffan	Germany	126.92	9	49.54	10	77.38
10	Mathilde Harold / Maël Demougeot	France	126.04	10	45.90	6	80.14
11	Guo Yuzhu / Zhao Pengkun	China	112.48	12	42.80	11	69.68
12	Maria Stavitskaia / Andrei Bagin	Russia	111.26	11	43.80	12	67.46
13	Wang Xiaotong / Zhao Kaige	China	100.02	13	38.82	13	61.20
14	Kristsina Kaunatskaia / Yuri Hulitski	Belarus	86.86	14	33.94	14	52.92
