= 2017 Cup of China =

2017 Audi Cup of China
- Type: Grand Prix
- Date: 3 November – 5
- Season: 2017–18
- Location: Beijing, China
- Venue: Capital Gymnasium

Champions
- Men's singles: (Russia) Mikhail Kolyada
- Ladies' singles: (Russia) Alina Zagitova
- Pairs: (China) Sui Wenjing / Han Cong
- Ice dance: (France) Gabriella Papadakis / Guillaume Cizeron
- Previous: 2016 Cup of China
- Next: 2018 Grand Prix of Helsinki
- Previous Grand Prix: 2017 Skate Canada International
- Next Grand Prix: 2017 NHK Trophy

The 2017 Audi Cup of China was the 3rd event of six in the 2017–18 ISU Grand Prix of Figure Skating, a senior-level international invitational competition series. It was held at the Capital Gymnasium in Beijing on 3–5 November. Medals were awarded in the disciplines of men's singles, ladies' singles, pair skating, and ice dance. Skaters earned points toward qualifying for the 2017–18 Grand Prix Final.

== Records ==
The following new ISU best scores were set during this competition:

Event	Component	Skater(s)	Score	Date	Ref
Ice dance	Free dance	(France) Gabriella Papadakis / Guillaume Cizeron	119.33	4 November 2017	
Ice dance	Total score	(France) Gabriella Papadakis / Guillaume Cizeron	200.43	4 November 2017	

== Entries ==
The ISU published the preliminary assignments on 26 May 2017.

Country	Men	Ladies	Pairs	Ice dance
Canada	Kevin Reynolds	Gabrielle Daleman	Kirsten Moore-Towers / Michael Marinaro	
China	Jin Boyang; Yan Han; Zhang He	Li Xiangning; Zhao Ziquan	Sui Wenjing / Han Cong; Yu Xiaoyu / Zhang Hao; Zhang Mingyang / Song Bowen	Chen Hong / Zhao Yan; Wang Shiyue / Liu Xinyu; Wang Xiaotong / Zhao Kaige
France				Angélique Abachkina / Louis Thauron; Gabriella Papadakis / Guillaume Cizeron
Italy			Nicole Della Monica / Matteo Guarise; Valentina Marchei / Ondřej Hotárek	
Japan	Keiji Tanaka	Wakaba Higuchi; Marin Honda; Mai Mihara		
Russia	Mikhail Kolyada; Alexander Petrov	Elena Radionova; Elizaveta Tuktamysheva; Alina Zagitova		Ekaterina Bobrova / Dmitri Soloviev; Tiffany Zahorski / Jonathan Guerreiro
South Korea		Choi Da-bin		
Spain	Javier Fernández			
Sweden	Alexander Majorov			
United States	Max Aaron; Grant Hochstein; Vincent Zhou	Amber Glenn	Ashley Cain-Gribble / Timothy LeDuc	Madison Chock / Evan Bates; Lorraine McNamara / Quinn Carpenter; Elliana Pogrebinsky / Alex Benoit

=== Changes to preliminary assignments ===
Discipline	Withdrew		Added		Notes	Ref.
Discipline	Date	Skater(s)	Date	Skater(s)	Notes	Ref.
Pairs	September 15	(United States) Tarah Kayne / Daniel O'Shea	September 15	(United States) Ashley Cain / Timothy LeDuc	Focus on injury recovery (Kayne)	
Men	—		September 20	(China) Zhang He	Host picks	
Pairs	—		September 20	(China) Zhang Mingyang / Song Bowen	Host picks	
Ice dance	October 16	(China) Song Linshu / Sun Zhuoming	October 16	(China) Wang Xiaotong / Zhao Kaige		
Ladies	October 13	(United States) Gracie Gold	October 23	(United States) Amber Glenn	Focus on treatment	
Ladies	October 31	(China) Li Zijun	—			
Pairs	October 31	(Czech Republic) Anna Dušková / Martin Bidař	—		Injury (Dušková)	

== Results ==
=== Men ===
Rank	Name	Nation	Total points	SP		FS	
1	Mikhail Kolyada	Russia	279.38	1	103.13	3	176.25
2	Jin Boyang	China	264.48	2	93.89	5	170.59
3	Max Aaron	United States	259.69	5	83.11	1	176.58
4	Vincent Zhou	United States	256.66	8	80.23	2	176.43
5	Yan Han	China	254.61	6	82.22	4	172.39
6	Javier Fernández	Spain	253.06	3	90.57	6	162.49
7	Keiji Tanaka	Japan	247.17	4	87.19	8	159.98
8	Kevin Reynolds	Canada	226.50	10	64.40	7	162.10
9	Grant Hochstein	United States	216.44	7	80.55	9	135.89
10	Alexander Majorov	Sweden	186.04	11	64.27	10	121.77
11	Alexander Petrov	Russia	186.02	9	68.58	12	117.44
12	Zhang He	China	167.58	12	46.99	11	120.59

=== Ladies ===
Rank	Name	Nation	Total points	SP		FS	
1	Alina Zagitova	Russia	213.88	4	69.44	1	144.44
2	Wakaba Higuchi	Japan	212.52	2	70.53	2	141.99
3	Elena Radionova	Russia	206.82	3	70.48	4	136.34
4	Mai Mihara	Japan	206.07	7	66.90	3	139.17
5	Marin Honda	Japan	198.32	6	66.90	5	131.42
6	Gabrielle Daleman	Canada	196.83	1	70.65	7	126.18
7	Elizaveta Tuktamysheva	Russia	196.68	5	67.10	6	129.58
8	Li Xiangning	China	174.82	8	59.20	8	115.62
9	Choi Da-bin	South Korea	165.99	9	53.90	9	112.09
10	Amber Glenn	United States	151.14	10	52.61	10	98.53
11	Zhao Ziquan	China	144.71	11	50.39	11	94.32

=== Pairs ===
Rank	Name	Nation	Total points	SP		FS	
1	Sui Wenjing / Han Cong	China	231.07	1	80.14	1	150.93
2	Yu Xiaoyu / Zhang Hao	China	205.54	2	71.37	2	134.17
3	Kirsten Moore-Towers / Michael Marinaro	Canada	194.52	4	62.52	3	132.00
4	Nicole Della Monica / Matteo Guarise	Italy	190.25	3	63.76	5	126.49
5	Valentina Marchei / Ondrej Hotárek	Italy	188.01	5	59.53	4	128.48
6	Ashley Cain-Gribble / Timothy LeDuc	United States	154.36	7	53.15	6	101.21
7	Zhang Mingyang / Song Bowen	China	148.34	6	53.15	7	95.19

=== Ice dance ===
Rank	Name	Nation	Total points	SD		FD	
1	Gabriella Papadakis / Guillaume Cizeron	France	200.43	1	81.10	1	119.33
2	Madison Chock / Evan Bates	United States	184.50	2	72.66	2	111.84
3	Ekaterina Bobrova / Dmitri Soloviev	Russia	182.84	3	72.34	3	110.50
4	Tiffany Zahorski / Jonathan Guerreiro	Russia	164.41	4	67.62	4	96.79
5	Lorraine McNamara / Quinn Carpenter	United States	157.61	5	63.65	5	93.96
6	Wang Shiyue / Liu Xinyu	China	151.17	8	59.07	6	92.10
7	Elliana Pogrebinsky / Alex Benoit	United States	150.47	7	59.32	7	91.15
8	Angélique Abachkina / Louis Thauron	France	144.90	6	59.91	8	84.99
9	Chen Hong / Zhao Yan	China	117.64	9	47.39	9	70.25
10	Wang Xiaotong / Zhao Kaige	China	102.66	10	38.74	10	63.92
