= 2014 Cup of China =

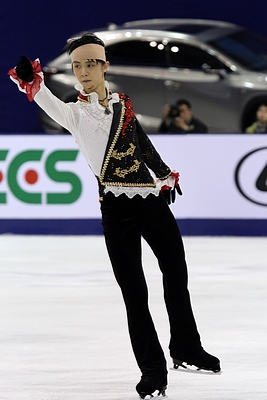
- Yuzuru Hanyu at 2014 Cup of China.jpg
- Type: Grand Prix
- Date: November 7 – 9
- Season: 2014–15
- Location: Shanghai
- Host: Chinese Skating Association
- Venue: Shanghai Oriental Sports Center

Champions
- Men's singles: (Russia) Maxim Kovtun
- Ladies' singles: (Russia) Elizaveta Tuktamysheva
- Pairs: (China) Peng Cheng / Zhang Hao
- Ice dance: (France) Gabriella Papadakis / Guillaume Cizeron
- Previous: 2013 Cup of China
- Next: 2015 Cup of China
- Previous Grand Prix: 2014 Skate Canada International
- Next Grand Prix: 2014 Rostelecom Cup

The 2014 Cup of China was the third event of six in the 2014–15 ISU Grand Prix of Figure Skating, a senior-level international invitational competition series. It was held at the Shanghai Oriental Sports Center in Shanghai on November 7–9. Medals were awarded in the disciplines of men's singles, ladies' singles, pair skating, and ice dancing. Skaters earned points toward qualifying for the 2014–15 Grand Prix Final.

== Entries ==
Country	Men	Ladies	Pairs	Ice dancing
Canada	Nam Nguyen	Gabrielle Daleman	Natasha Purich / Andrew Wolfe	Alexandra Paul / Mitchell Islam
China	Guan Yuhang; Wang Yi; Yan Han	Li Zijun	Peng Cheng / Zhang Hao; Wang Xuehan / Wang Lei; Yu Xiaoyu / Jin Yang	Wang Shiyue / Liu Xinyu; Zhang Yiyi / Wu Nan; Zhao Yue / Zheng Xun
France				Gabriella Papadakis / Guillaume Cizeron
Israel	Alexei Bychenko			
Italy			Nicole Della Monica / Matteo Guarise	Anna Cappellini / Luca Lanotte
Japan	Yuzuru Hanyu; Keiji Tanaka	Kanako Murakami		
Norway		Anne Line Gjersem		
Russia	Maxim Kovtun	Yulia Lipnitskaya; Elizaveta Tuktamysheva	Vera Bazarova / Andrei Deputat; Arina Cherniavskaia / Antonio Souza-Kordeyru	Elena Ilinykh / Ruslan Zhiganshin
Sweden		Viktoria Helgesson		
South Korea	Kim Jin-seo	Kim Hae-jin		
United States	Richard Dornbush	Ashley Cain; Polina Edmunds; Christina Gao	Jessica Calalang / Zack Sidhu	Maia Shibutani / Alex Shibutani
Uzbekistan	Misha Ge			

=== Changes to preliminary roster ===
- On September 2, Zhao Yue / Zheng Xun were announced as host picks.
- On September 2, Peter Liebers was removed from the roster due to an injury. On September 9, Alexei Bychenko was added as his replacement.
- On September 2, Zhao Yue / Zheng Xun were added as a host pick.
- On September 9, Kim Hae-jin was added to the roster, in place of a host pick.
- On September 29, Julia Antipova / Nodari Maisuradze were removed from the roster, due to Antipova being hospitalized due to Anorexia. On October 9, Jessica Calalang / Zack Sidhu were announced as their replacements.
- On September 22, it was reported that Tatiana Volosozhar / Maxim Trankov were going to be withdrawing due to an injury to Trankov. On October 1, they were removed from the roster. On October 13, their replacements were announced as Arina Cherniavskaia / Antonio Souza-Kordeyru.
- On October 16, Zhan Bush and was removed from the roster due to health problems. On October 21, Kim Jin-seo was announced as his replacement.
- On October 17, Tarah Kayne / Daniel O'Shea was removed from the roster due to lack of training time. On October 22, Natasha Purich / Andrew Wolfe were announced as their replacements.
- On October 24, Joshua Farris was removed from the roster due to his high ankle sprain not yet being recovered. He was not replaced.
- On October 30, Song Nan was removed from the roster. No reason has been given. He was replaced by Guan Yuhang.
- On November 3, Zhang Kexin was removed from the roster. No reason has been given. She was not replaced.

== Results ==
=== Men ===
Prior to the free skating, Yan Han and Yuzuru Hanyu collided on the ice during warm-up. Both had visible injuries and were bleeding, yet still chose to compete. Hanyu later received stitches for his injuries. He also skipped the medal ceremony afterwards.

Rank	Name	Nation	Total points	SP		FS	
1	Maxim Kovtun	Russia	243.34	1	85.96	1	157.38
2	Yuzuru Hanyu	Japan	237.55	2	82.95	2	154.60
3	Richard Dornbush	United States	226.73	4	77.23	4	149.50
4	Nam Nguyen	Canada	221.85	6	72.85	5	149.00
5	Misha Ge	Uzbekistan	219.28	7	69.46	3	149.82
6	Yan Han	China	206.65	3	79.21	7	127.44
7	Alexei Bychenko	Israel	204.15	5	76.96	8	127.19
8	Keiji Tanaka	Japan	189.26	11	56.82	6	132.44
9	Kim Jin-seo	South Korea	183.46	9	62.46	9	121.00
10	Guan Yuhang	China	177.66	8	63.69	10	113.97
11	Wang Yi	China	160.92	10	57.29	11	103.63

=== Ladies ===
Rank	Name	Nation	Total points	SP		FS	
1	Elizaveta Tuktamysheva	Russia	196.60	2	67.99	1	128.61
2	Yulia Lipnitskaya	Russia	173.57	1	69.56	4	104.01
3	Kanako Murakami	Japan	169.39	3	60.44	3	108.95
4	Polina Edmunds	United States	161.27	7	50.32	2	110.95
5	Gabrielle Daleman	Canada	161.26	4	58.49	5	102.77
6	Li Zijun	China	152.62	5	53.66	6	98.96
7	Viktoria Helgesson	Sweden	143.95	6	52.00	8	91.95
8	Kim Hae-jin	South Korea	137.62	9	44.72	7	92.90
9	Christina Gao	United States	125.04	8	47.15	11	77.89
10	Ashley Cain	United States	124.81	11	39.80	9	85.01
11	Anne Line Gjersem	Norway	122.78	10	41.93	10	80.85

=== Pairs ===
Rank	Name	Nation	Total points	SP		FS	
1	Peng Cheng / Zhang Hao	China	194.05	1	69.11	1	124.94
2	Yu Xiaoyu / Jin Yang	China	173.33	3	57.03	2	116.30
3	Wang Xuehan / Wang Lei	China	172.15	2	57.27	3	114.88
4	Vera Bazarova / Andrei Deputat	Russia	166.44	4	56.85	4	109.59
5	Nicole Della Monica / Matteo Guarise	Italy	155.90	7	53.48	5	102.42
6	Natasha Purich / Andrew Wolfe	Canada	153.70	5	56.14	6	97.56
7	Jessica Calalang / Zack Sidhu	United States	147.81	6	54.66	7	93.15
8	Arina Cherniavskaia / Antonio Souza-Kordeyru	Russia	133.45	8	46.74	8	86.71

=== Ice dancing ===
Rank	Name	Nation	Total points	SP		FS	
1	Gabriella Papadakis / Guillaume Cizeron	France	160.12	3	62.12	1	98.00
2	Maia Shibutani / Alex Shibutani	United States	157.36	1	65.20	2	92.16
3	Anna Cappellini / Luca Lanotte	Italy	149.58	2	62.70	3	86.88
4	Elena Ilinykh / Ruslan Zhiganshin	Russia	144.70	4	60.48	4	84.22
5	Alexandra Paul / Mitchell Islam	Canada	140.46	5	56.46	5	84.00
6	Wang Shiyue / Liu Xinyu	China	126.18	6	49.50	6	76.68
7	Zhang Yiyi / Wu Nan	China	108.66	7	44.90	7	63.76
8	Zhao Yue / Zheng Xun	China	103.44	8	41.88	8	61.56
