= 2015 Cup of China =

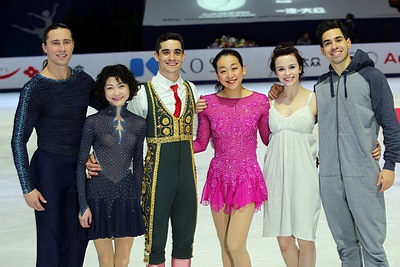
- Type: Grand Prix
- Date: November 6 – 8
- Season: 2015–16
- Location: Beijing
- Host: Chinese Skating Association
- Venue: Capital Indoor Stadium

Champions
- Men's singles: (Spain) Javier Fernández
- Ladies' singles: (Japan) Mao Asada
- Pairs: (Russia) Yuko Kavaguti / Alexander Smirnov
- Ice dance: (Italy) Anna Cappellini / Luca Lanotte
- Previous: 2014 Cup of China
- Next: 2016 Cup of China
- Previous Grand Prix: 2015 Skate Canada International
- Next Grand Prix: 2015 Trophée Éric Bompard

The 2015 Cup of China was the third event of six in the 2015–16 ISU Grand Prix of Figure Skating, a senior-level international invitational competition series. It was held at the Capital Indoor Stadium in Beijing on November 6–8. Medals were awarded in the disciplines of men's singles, ladies' singles, pair skating, and ice dancing. Skaters earned points toward qualifying for the 2015–16 Grand Prix Final.

== Entries ==
Country	Men	Ladies	Pairs	Ice dancing
Canada	Elladj Baldé		Vanessa Grenier / Maxime Deschamps; Lubov Iliushechkina / Dylan Moscovitch	
China	Jin Boyang; Song Nan; Yan Han	Li Zijun; Zhao Ziquan; Zheng Lu	Sui Wenjing / Han Cong; Wang Xuehan / Wang Lei; Yu Xiaoyu / Jin Yang	Cong Yue / Sun Zhuoming; Wang Shiyue / Liu Xinyu; Zhao Yue / Zheng Xun
Germany			Mari Vartmann / Ruben Blommaert	
Italy	Ivan Righini			Anna Cappellini / Luca Lanotte
Japan		Mao Asada; Rika Hongo		
Philippines	Michael Christian Martinez			
South Korea		Park So-youn		
Russia	Moris Kvitelashvili; Sergei Voronov	Anna Pogorilaya; Elena Radionova	Kristina Astakhova / Alexei Rogonov; Yuko Kavaguti / Alexander Smirnov	Elena Ilinykh / Ruslan Zhiganshin
Slovakia		Nicole Rajičová		Federica Testa / Lukáš Csölley
Spain	Javier Fernández			
United States	Richard Dornbush; Grant Hochstein	Karen Chen; Courtney Hicks; Hannah Miller		Madison Chock / Evan Bates; Kaitlin Hawayek / Jean-Luc Baker
Uzbekistan	Misha Ge			

=== Changes to preliminary roster ===
- On August 17, 2015, Daniel Samohin and Lina Fedorova / Maxim Miroshkin were removed from the roster. No reasons were given. However, Samohin is not eligible to compete on the Senior Grand Prix circuit due to competing on the Junior Grand Prix this season. On August 21, Elladj Baldé and Vanessa Grenier / Maxime Deschamps were announced as their replacements.
- On September 14, Zhao Ziquan, Zheng Lu, and Cong Yue / Sun Zhuoming were added as host picks.
- On October 6, Madeline Aaron / Max Settlage were removed from the roster. No reason has been given. Their replacement was announced as Mari Vartmann / Ruben Blommaert.
- On October 15, Takahiko Kozuka was removed from the roster due to an injury. On October 16, his replacement was announced as Ivan Righini.
- On November 5, China's Cong / Sun withdrew from the ice dancing event due to a medical reason.

== Results ==
=== Men ===
Rank	Name	Nation	Total points	SP		FS	
1	Javier Fernández	Spain	270.55	1	93.19	1	177.36
2	Jin Boyang	China	261.26	2	90.05	2	171.18
3	Yan Han	China	230.33	6	73.97	3	156.36
4	Grant Hochstein	United States	222.74	5	74.27	4	148.47
5	Sergei Voronov	Russia	222.17	3	80.99	8	141.18
6	Michael Christian Martinez	Philippines	220.36	7	72.24	5	148.12
7	Richard Dornbush	United States	217.26	8	70.21	7	147.05
8	Misha Ge	Uzbekistan	217.17	9	69.13	6	148.04
9	Song Nan	China	212.10	4	76.46	9	135.64
10	Ivan Righini	Italy	200.98	10	68.98	11	132.00
11	Elladj Baldé	Canada	199.41	12	64.68	10	134.73
12	Moris Kvitelashvili	Russia	192.10	11	66.92	12	125.18

=== Ladies ===
Rank	Name	Nation	Total points	SP		FS	
1	Mao Asada	Japan	197.48	1	71.73	3	125.75
2	Rika Hongo	Japan	195.76	2	65.79	1	129.97
3	Elena Radionova	Russia	184.28	6	58.51	2	125.77
4	Anna Pogorilaya	Russia	184.16	4	61.47	4	122.69
5	Karen Chen	United States	175.93	7	58.30	5	117.63
6	Courtney Hicks	United States	166.00	3	62.38	8	103.62
7	Nicole Rajičová	Slovakia	165.26	9	54.76	7	110.50
8	Park So-youn	South Korea	164.28	10	52.47	6	111.81
9	Li Zijun	China	159.13	5	58.62	9	100.51
10	Hannah Miller	United States	151.73	8	55.25	10	96.48
11	Zhao Ziquan	China	139.77	11	48.66	11	91.11
12	Zheng Lu	China	130.32	12	47.23	12	83.09

=== Pairs ===
Rank	Name	Nation	Total points	SP		FS	
1	Yuko Kavaguti / Alexander Smirnov	Russia	216.00	2	72.45	1	143.55
2	Sui Wenjing / Han Cong	China	215.62	1	74.40	2	141.22
3	Yu Xiaoyu / Jin Yang	China	197.75	3	70.06	3	127.69
4	Wang Xuehan / Wang Lei	China	186.76	4	69.36	4	117.40
5	Kristina Astakhova / Alexei Rogonov	Russia	173.36	6	59.17	5	114.19
6	Mari Vartmann / Ruben Blommaert	Germany	171.41	5	63.45	7	107.96
7	Lubov Iliushechkina / Dylan Moscovitch	Canada	166.80	7	55.42	6	111.38
8	Vanessa Grenier / Maxime Deschamps	Canada	159.34	8	52.41	8	106.93

=== Ice dancing ===
Rank	Name	Nation	Total points	SD		FD	
1	Anna Cappellini / Luca Lanotte	Italy	173.30	1	66.39	1	106.91
2	Madison Chock / Evan Bates	United States	169.16	2	65.36	2	103.80
3	Elena Ilinykh / Ruslan Zhiganshin	Russia	159.00	3	63.54	3	95.46
4	Federica Testa / Lukáš Csölley	Slovakia	136.17	5	53.90	4	82.27
5	Zhao Yue / Zheng Xun	China	129.65	6	51.02	5	78.63
6	Wang Shiyue / Liu Xinyu	China	126.73	7	50.64	6	76.09
WD	Kaitlin Hawayek / Jean-Luc Baker	United States	withdrew	4	58.35	withdrew from competition	
WD	Cong Yue / Sun Zhuoming	China	withdrew	withdrew from competition			
