= 2004 NHK Trophy =

Figure staking competition

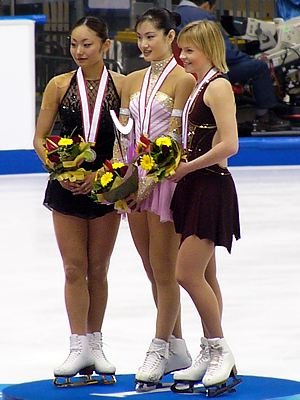
- Type: Grand Prix
- Date: November 4 – 7
- Season: 2004–05
- Location: Nagoya
- Venue: Rainbow Ice Arena

Champions
- Men's singles: (United States) Johnny Weir
- Ladies' singles: (Japan) Shizuka Arakawa
- Pairs: (Russia) Maria Petrova / Alexei Tikhonov
- Ice dance: (Bulgaria) Albena Denkova / Maxim Staviski
- Previous: 2003 NHK Trophy
- Next: 2005 NHK Trophy
- Previous Grand Prix: 2004 Skate Canada International
- Next Grand Prix: 2004 Cup of China

The 2004 NHK Trophy was the third event of six in the 2004–05 ISU Grand Prix of Figure Skating, a senior-level international invitational competition series. It was held at the Rainbow Ice Arena in Nagoya on November 4–7. Medals were awarded in the disciplines of men's singles, ladies' singles, pair skating, and ice dancing. Skaters earned points toward qualifying for the 2004–05 Grand Prix Final. The compulsory dance was the Midnight Blues.

== Results ==
=== Men ===
Rank	Name	Nation	Total points	SP		FS	
1	Johnny Weir	United States	220.25	1	74.05	1	146.20
2	Timothy Goebel	United States	208.28	2	72.20	2	136.08
3	Frédéric Dambier	France	197.37	4	66.85	4	130.52
4	Michael Weiss	United States	193.00	3	70.06	6	122.94
5	Li Chengjiang	China	192.04	8	59.56	3	132.48
6	Nicholas Young	Canada	183.64	7	59.74	5	123.90
7	Takeshi Honda	Japan	182.84	5	64.10	8	118.74
8	Kensuke Nakaniwa	Japan	181.27	6	61.01	7	120.26
9	Shawn Sawyer	Canada	167.99	9	57.99	9	110.00
10	Alban Préaubert	France	153.94	11	53.82	10	100.12
11	Alexander Shubin	Russia	151.92	10	56.60	11	95.32
12	Hirokazu Kobayashi	Japan	135.19	12	47.05	12	88.14

=== Ladies ===
Rank	Name	Nation	Total points	SP		FS	
1	Shizuka Arakawa	Japan	179.06	1	64.20	2	114.86
2	Miki Ando	Japan	170.36	3	50.90	1	119.46
3	Elena Sokolova	Russia	148.76	2	52.98	4	95.78
4	Yoshie Onda	Japan	146.68	6	46.46	3	100.22
5	Viktoria Volchkova	Russia	141.72	5	48.12	5	93.60
6	Elena Liashenko	Ukraine	138.32	4	48.94	6	89.38
7	Miriam Manzano	Australia	128.42	8	43.68	7	84.74
8	Amber Corwin	United States	127.24	9	42.58	8	84.66
9	Alisa Drei	Finland	126.60	7	44.30	9	82.30
10	Idora Hegel	Croatia	111.22	10	39.74	10	71.48
11	Valentina Marchei	Italy	95.18	11	30.54	11	64.64

=== Pairs ===
Rank	Name	Nation	Total points	SP		FS	
1	Maria Petrova / Alexei Tikhonov	Russia	187.56	1	66.44	1	121.12
2	Pang Qing / Tong Jian	China	179.62	2	64.82	3	114.80
3	Dorota Zagorska / Mariusz Siudek	Poland	177.24	3	61.84	2	115.40
4	Rena Inoue / John Baldwin, Jr.	United States	155.20	4	53.86	4	101.34
5	Utako Wakamatsu / Jean-Sébastien Fecteau	Canada	138.04	6	46.58	5	91.46
6	Natalia Shestakova / Pavel Lebedev	Russia	127.90	5	51.18	7	76.72
7	Julia Beloglazova / Andrei Bekh	Ukraine	124.60	7	42.06	6	82.54
8	Eva-Maria Fitze / Rico Rex	Germany	115.42	8	41.66	8	73.76
9	Marina Aganina / Artem Knyazev	Uzbekistan	111.46	9	40.70	9	70.76

=== Ice dancing ===
Rank	Name	Nation	Total points	CD		OD		FD	
1	Albena Denkova / Maxim Staviski	Bulgaria	204.62	2	39.80	1	60.56	1	104.26
2	Tatiana Navka / Roman Kostomarov	Russia	201.14	1	41.47	3	58.13	2	101.54
3	Isabelle Delobel / Olivier Schoenfelder	France	197.53	3	38.50	2	58.55	3	100.48
4	Melissa Gregory / Denis Petukhov	United States	177.54	4	34.69	4	54.86	4	87.99
5	Svetlana Kulikova / Vitali Novikov	Russia	159.83	5	30.61	5	48.13	6	81.09
6	Natalia Gudina / Alexei Beletski	Israel	156.42	7	28.28	7	43.63	5	84.51
7	Julia Golovina / Oleg Voiko	Ukraine	147.15	8	26.63	6	44.48	7	76.04
8	Nozomi Watanabe / Akiyuki Kido	Japan	144.73	6	28.33	8	43.36	8	73.04
9	Nakako Tsuzuki / Kenji Miyamoto	Japan	121.82	10	25.90	9	36.68	9	59.24
10	Yang Fang / Gao Chongbo	China	118.78	9	26.00	10	34.32	10	58.46
11	Olga Akimova / Alexander Shakalov	Uzbekistan	114.30	11	24.08	11	33.11	11	57.11
WD	Christina Beier / William Beier	Germany							
