= Wang Huan =

Wang Huan is the name of

- Wang Huan (figure skater) (born 1983), Chinese figure skater
- Wang Huan (water polo) (born 1997), Chinese water polo player
