= Chinese Figure Skating Championships =

Recurring figure skating competition

- Status: Active
- Genre: National championships
- Frequency: Annual
- Country: China
- Organizer: Chinese Figure Skating Association

The Chinese Figure Skating Championships (Chinese: 中国花样滑冰锦标赛) is a senior-level figure skating national championship held by the Chinese Figure Skating Association (Chinese: 中国花样滑冰协会) to determine the Chinese national champions. Skaters compete in the disciplines of men's singles, ladies' singles, pair skating, and ice dancing.

Chinese Figure Skating Championships
- Traditional Chinese: 中國花樣滑冰錦標賽
- Simplified Chinese: 中国花样滑冰锦标赛
Transcriptions
Standard Mandarin
- Hanyu Pinyin: Zhōngguó Huāyàng Huábīng Jǐnbiāosài

== Senior medalists ==
=== Men's singles ===
Men's event results
Year	Location	Gold	Silver	Bronze	Ref.
1986	Harbin	Zhang Shubin	Xu Zhaoxiao	Luo Changyu	
1987			Xusheng Yu		
1994	Changchun	Zhang Min			
1995			Zhang Min		
1997			Li Chengjiang	Zhang Min	
1998		Li Chengjiang		Zhang Min	
1999		Li Chengjiang	Zhang Min	Guo Zhengxin	
2000			Li Chengjiang	Zhang Min	
2001	Changchun	Li Chengjiang	Zhang Min	Gao Song	
2002	Harbin	Zhang Min	Li Chengjiang	Gao Song	
2003	Harbin	Zhang Min	Li Yunfei	Song Lun	
2004	Harbin	Li Chengjiang	Zhang Min	Gao Song	
2005	Nanjing	Zhang Min	Song Lun	Gao Song	
2006	Qiqihar	Gao Song	Xu Ming	Wu Jialiang	
2007	Beijing	Li Chengjiang	Xu Ming	Wu Jialiang	
2008	Jilin City	Li Chengjiang	Wu Jialiang	Xu Ming	
2009	Beijing	Song Nan	Li Chengjiang	Xu Ming	
2010	Changchun	Guan Jinlin	Wu Jialiang	Song Nan	
2011	Qiqihar	Yan Han	Song Nan	Wu Jialiang	
2012	Changchun	Song Nan	Wu Jialiang	Yan Han	
2013	Harbin	Song Nan	Yan Han	Jin Boyang	
2014	Changchun	Jin Boyang	Song Nan	Guan Jinlin	
2015	Changchun	Jin Boyang	Yan Han	Guan Yuhang	
2016	Harbin	Jin Boyang	Song Nan	Zang Wenbo	
2017	Jilin City	Jin Boyang	Guan Yuhang	Li Tangxu	
2018	Changchun	Yan Han	Zhang He	Hao Yan	
2019	Harbin	Jin Boyang	Zhang He	Liu Runqi	
2020	Changchun	Yan Han	Zhang He	Wang Yi	
2021	Beijing	Competitions cancelled due to the COVID-19 pandemic			
2022	Chengde				
2023	Chengde	Chen Yudong	Han Wenbao	Dai Daiwei	
2024	Chengde	Chen Yudong	Dai Daiwei	Han Wenbao	
2025	Chengde	Chen Yudong	Dai Daiwei	Peng Zhiming	
2026	Harbin	Jin Boyang	Chen Yudong	Peng Zhiming	

=== Women's singles ===
Women's event results
Year	Location	Gold	Silver	Bronze	Ref.
1986	Harbin	Fu Caishu	Jiang Yibing	Li Cao	
1990	Changchun	Chen Lu			
1991	Changchun	Chen Lu			
1992	Changchun	Chen Lu			
1993	Changchun	Chen Lu			
1994	Changchun	Chen Lu			
1995	Changchun	Chen Lu			
1996	Changchun	Chen Lu			
1997	Changchun	Chen Lu			
1998	Changchun	Chen Lu		Wang Qingyun	
1999	Changchun	Wang Huan			
2000	Changchun	Fang Dan	Sun Siyin	Wang Huan	
2001	Changchun	Chen Lu	Sun Siyin	Fang Dan	
2002	Harbin	Fang Dan	Sun Siyin	Wang Qingyun	
2003	Harbin	Fang Dan	Sun Siyin	Xu Binshu	
2004	Harbin	Xu Binshu	Fang Dan	Liu Yan	
2005	Nanjing	Liu Yan	Fang Dan	Xu Binshu	
2006	Qiqihar	Xu Binshu	Fang Dan	Dong Huibo	
2007	Beijing	Liu Yan	Xu Binshu	Fang Dan	
2008	Jilin City	Liu Yan	Geng Bingwa	Wang Yueren	
2009	Beijing	Liu Yan	Xu Binshu	Zhu Qiuying	
2010	Changchun	Li Zijun	Liu Yan	Zhu Qiuying	
2011	Qiqihar	Li Zijun	Geng Bingwa	Zhang Ying	
2012	Changchun	Li Zijun	Zhao Ziquan	Zhang Ying	
2013	Harbin	Li Zijun	Zhao Ziquan	Wang Jialei	
2014	Changchun	Zhang Kexin	Zhao Ziquan	Li Xiangning	
2015	Changchun	Li Zijun	Zhao Ziquan	Li Xiangning	
2016	Harbin	Zhao Ziquan	Li Xiangning	Jiao Yunya	
2017	Jilin City	Zhao Ziquan	Li Xiangning	Zhang Yixuan	
2018	Changchun	Li Xiangning	Zhao Ziquan	Chen Hongyi	
2019	Harbin	(Hong Kong) Yi Christy Leung	An Xiangyi	Chen Hongyi	
2020	Changchun	An Xiangyi	Chen Hongyi	Lin Shan	
2021	Beijing	Competitions cancelled due to the COVID-19 pandemic			
2022	Chengde				
2023	Chengde	An Xiangyi	Li Ruotang	Tong Ruichen	
2024	Chengde	Wang Yihan	Shuxian Jin	Gao Shiqi	
2025	Chengde	Shuxian Jin	Gao Shiqi	Wang Yihan	
2026	Harbin	Shuxian Jin	Zhang Ruiyang	Zhu Yi	

=== Pairs ===
Pairs event results
Year	Location	Gold	Silver	Bronze	Ref.
1986	Harbin	Mei Zhibin; Li Wei	Chen Liling; Qin Wenjun	Xiao Yuhang; Zhang Zhiqiang	
1993		Shen Xue; Zhao Hongbo			
1994	Changchun	Shen Xue; Zhao Hongbo			
1995			Shen Xue; Zhao Hongbo		
1996		Shen Xue; Zhao Hongbo			
1997		Shen Xue; Zhao Hongbo	Pang Qing; Tong Jian		
1998		Shen Xue; Zhao Hongbo	Pang Qing; Tong Jian		
1999		Shen Xue; Zhao Hongbo	Pang Qing; Tong Jian		
2000		Pang Qing; Tong Jian	Zhang Dan; Zhang Hao		
2001	Changchun	Shen Xue; Zhao Hongbo	Pang Qing; Tong Jian	Zhang Dan; Zhang Hao	
2002	Harbin	Shen Xue; Zhao Hongbo	Pang Qing; Tong Jian	Zhang Dan; Zhang Hao	
2003	Harbin	Zhang Dan; Zhang Hao	Ding Yang; Ren Zhongfei	An Ni; Wei Tao	
2004	Harbin	Pang Qing; Tong Jian	Zhang Dan; Zhang Hao	Ding Yang; Ren Zhongfei	
2005	Nanjing	Ding Yang; Ren Zhongfei	Wang Xue; Wang Jian	An Ni; Wu Yiming	
2006	Qiqihar	Zhao Rui; An Yang	An Ni; Wu Yiming	Li Jiaqi; Xu Jiankun	
2007	Beijing	Pang Qing; Tong Jian	Li Jiaqi; Xu Jiankun	Wang Xue; Wang Jian	
2008	Jilin City	Zhang Dan; Zhang Hao	Pang Qing; Tong Jian	Li Jiaqi; Xu Jiankun	
2009	Beijing	Dong Huibo; Wu Yiming	Zhang Yue; Wang Lei	Cheng Duo; Gao Yu	
2010	Beijing	Sui Wenjing; Han Cong	Yu Xiaoyu; Jin Yang	Zhang Yue; Wang Lei	
2011	Qiqihar	Sui Wenjing; Han Cong	Yu Xiaoyu; Jin Yang	Zhang Yue; Wang Lei	
2012	Changchun	Zhang Dan; Zhang Hao	Sui Wenjing; Han Cong	Yu Xiaoyu; Jin Yang	
2013	Harbin	Yu Xiaoyu; Jin Yang	Wang Wenting; Zhang Yan	Wang Xuehan; Wang Lei	
2014	Changchun	Peng Cheng; Zhang Hao	Sui Wenjing; Han Cong	Yu Xiaoyu; Jin Yang	
2015	Changchun	Yu Xiaoyu; Jin Yang	Wang Xuehan; Wang Lei	Sui Jiaying; Yang Yongchao	
2016	Harbin	Wang Xuehan; Wang Lei	Sui Jiaying; Yang Yongchao	Zhao Ying; Xie Zhong	
2017	Jilin City	Peng Cheng; Jin Yang	Han Yue; Yang Yongchao	Gao Yumeng; Xie Zhong	
2018	Changchun	Yu Xiaoyu; Zhang Hao	Peng Cheng; Jin Yang	Wang Xuehan; Wang Lei	
2019	Harbin	Peng Cheng; Jin Yang	Wang Xuehan; Wang Lei	Tang Feiyao; Yang Yongchao	
2020	Changchun	Peng Cheng; Jin Yang	Tang Feiyao; Yang Yongchao	Chelsea Liu; Liu Jiaxi	
2021	Beijing	Competitions cancelled due to the COVID-19 pandemic			
2022	Chengde				
2023	Chengde	Zhang Siyang; Yang Yongchao	Wang Huidi; Jia Ziqi	Zhang Jiaxuan; Huang Yihang	
2024	Chengde	Peng Cheng; Wang Lei	Zhang Jiaxuan; Huang Yihang	Zhang Siyang; Yang Yongchao	
2025	Chengde	Zhang Jiaxuan; Huang Yihang	Feng Wenqiang; Zhang Xuanqi	Guo Rui; Zhang Yiwen	
2026	Harbin	Sui Wenjing; Han Cong	Guo Rui; Zhang Yiwen	Zhang Jiaxuan; Huang Yihang	

=== Ice dance ===
Ice dance event results
Year	Location	Gold	Silver	Bronze	Ref.
1986	Harbin	Liu Luyang; Zhao Xiaolei	Han Bing; Yang Hui	Liu Di; Ye Fu	
1996		Zhang Weina; Cao Xianming	Wan Rui; Zhang Wei		
1997		Zhang Weina; Cao Xianming	Wan Rui; Zhang Wei		
1998		Zhang Weina; Cao Xianming	Wan Rui; Zhang Wei		
1999		Zhang Weina; Cao Xianming	Wan Rui; Zhang Wei		
2000		Zhang Weina; Cao Xianming	Wan Rui; Zhang Wei	Yang Fang; Gao Chongbo	
2001	Changchun	Yang Fang; Gao Chongbo	Fan Ru; Suo Bin	Qi Jia; Sun Xu	
2002	Harbin	Zhang Weina; Cao Xianming	Qi Jia; Sun Xu	Yu Xiaoyang; Wang Chen	
2003	Harbin	Yang Fang; Gao Chongbo	Qi Jia; Sun Xu	Fan Ru; Suo Bin	
2004	Harbin	Yang Fang; Gao Chongbo	Yu Xiaoyang; Wang Chen	Huang Xintong; Zheng Xun	
2005	Nanjing	Yang Fang; Gao Chongbo	Zhang Weina; Cao Xianming	Yu Xiaoyang; Wang Chen	
2006	Qiqihar	Yu Xiaoyang; Wang Chen	Huang Xintong; Zheng Xun	Wang Jiayue; Meng Fei	
2007	Beijing	Huang Xintong; Zheng Xun	Yu Xiaoyang; Wang Chen	Liu Lu; Suo Bin	
2008	Jilin City	Yu Xiaoyang; Wang Chen	Guan Xueting; Wang Meng	Zhang Yiyi; Wu Nan	
2009	Beijing	Huang Xintong; Zheng Xun	Guan Xueting; Wang Meng	Yu Xiaoyang; Wang Chen	
2010	Changchun	Yu Xiaoyang; Wang Chen	Huang Xintong; Zheng Xun	Guan Xueting; Wang Meng	
2011	Qiqihar	Huang Xintong; Zheng Xun	Yu Xiaoyang; Wang Chen	Zhang Yiyi; Wu Nan	
2012	Changchun	Huang Xintong; Zheng Xun	Yu Xiaoyang; Wang Chen	Zhang Yiyi; Wu Nan	
2013	Harbin	Yu Xiaoyang; Wang Chen	Wang Shiyue; Liu Xinyu	Zhao Yue; Liu Chang	
2014	Changchun	Huang Xintong; Zheng Xun	Yu Xiaoyang; Wang Chen	Wang Shiyue; Liu Xinyu	
2015	Changchun	Wang Shiyue; Liu Xinyu	Zhao Yue; Zheng Xun	Chen Hong; Zhao Yan	
2016	Harbin	Zhao Yue; Zheng Xun	Chen Hong; Zhao Yan	Zhang Yiyi; Wu Nan	
2017	Jilin City	Chen Hong; Zhao Yan	Li Xibei; Xiang Guangyao	Guo Yuzhu; Zhao Pengkun	
2018	Changchun	Wang Shiyue; Liu Xinyu	Song Linshu; Sun Zhuoming	Ning Wanqi; Wang Chao	
2019	Harbin	Wang Shiyue; Liu Xinyu	Chen Hong; Sun Zhuoming	Ning Wanqi; Wang Chao	
2020	Changchun	Wang Shiyue; Liu Xinyu	Chen Hong; Sun Zhuoming	Ning Wanqi; Wang Chao	
2021	Beijing	Competitions cancelled due to the COVID-19 pandemic			
2022	Chengde				
2023	Chengde	Chen Xizi; Xing Jianing	Li Xuantong; Wang Xinkang	Zhang Meihong; Meng Bolin	
2024	Chengde	Chen Xizi; Xing Jianing	Shi Shang; Wu Nan	Xiao Zixi; He Linghao	
2025	Chengde	Ren Junfei; Xing Jianing	Xiao Zixi; He Linghao	Lin Yufei; Gao Zijian	
2026	Harbin	Wang Shiyue; Liu Xinyu	Ren Junfei; Xing Jianing	Xiao Zixi; He Linghao	

== Junior medalists ==
=== Men's singles ===
Junior men's event medalists
Year	Location	Gold	Silver	Bronze	Ref.
2020	Changchun	Chen Yudong	Liu Mutong	Dai Daiwei	
2021	Beijing	Competitions cancelled due to the COVID-19 pandemic			
2022	Chengde				
2023	Chengde	Chen Yudong	Han Wenbao	Jiang Zhiao	
2024	Harbin	Tian Tonghe	Chen Yudong	Han Wenbao	
2025	Jilin City	Zhao Qihan	(Hong Kong) Li Jiarui	Wang Zexin	
2026	Jilin City	Zhao Qihan	Tian Tonghe	(Hong Kong) Li Jiarui	

=== Women's singles ===
Junior women's event medalists
Year	Location	Gold	Silver	Bronze	Ref.
2020	Changchun	Jin Hengxin	Xia Xiaoyu	Zhang Yixuan	
2021	Beijing	Competitions cancelled due to the COVID-19 pandemic			
2022	Chengde				
2023	Chengde	(Hong Kong) Megan Wong	Xu Wandi	Cheng Jiaying	
2024	Harbin	Gao Shiqi	Li Ruotang	Wang Yihan	
2025	Jilin City	Shuxian Jin	Wang Yihan	Gao Shiqi	
2026	Jilin City	Wang Yihan	Shuxian Jin	Gao Shiqi	

=== Pairs ===
Junior pairs event medalists
Year	Location	Gold	Silver	Bronze	Ref.
2020	Changchun	Wang Yuchen; Huang Yihang	Wang Huidi; Jia Ziqi	Li Jiaen; Wang Zijian	
2021	Beijing	Competitions cancelled due to the COVID-19 pandemic			
2022	Chengde				
2023	Chengde	Yang Yixi; Deng Shunyang	No other competitors		
2024	Harbin	No pairs competitors			
2025	Jilin City	Guo Rui; Zhang Yiwen	Chen Meishuyu; Wang Zhiyu	No other competitors	

=== Ice dance ===
Year	Location	Gold	Silver	Bronze	Ref.
2020	Changchun	Chen Xizi; Xing Jianing	Lin Yufei; Gao Zijian	Cao Luchang; Chen Jianxu	
2021	Beijing	Competitions cancelled due to the COVID-19 pandemic			
2022	Chengde				
2023	Chengde	Lin Yufei; Gao Zijian	Li Xuantong; Wang Xinkang	Yin Shanje; Yang Shirui	
2024	Harbin	Lin Yufei; Gao Zijian	Li Xuantong; Wang Xinkang	Liu Tong; Ge Quanshuo	
2025	Jilin City	Yin Shanje; Yang Shirui	Yu Xinyi; Liu Tianyi	Meng Lingxuan; Chen Lang	
2026	Jilin City	Yin Shanje; Yang Shirui	Ding Xinai; Zheng Hanchong	Guo Yuxi; Ji Zhouhao	

== Records ==
Records
Discipline	Most championship titles			
Discipline	Skater(s)	No.	Years	Ref.
Men's singles	Li Chengjiang	6	1998–99; 2001; 2004; 2007–08	
Men's singles	Jin Boyang	6	2014–17; 2019; 2026	
Women's singles	Chen Lu	10	1990–98; 2001	
Pairs	Shen Xue; Zhao Hongbo	8	1993–94; 1996–99; 2001–02	
Ice dance	Zhang Weina; Cao Xianming	6	1996–2000; 2002	
Ice dance	Zheng Xun (Note: Zheng Xun won five championship titles while partnered with Huang Xintong and one with Zhao Yue)	6	2007; 2009; 2011–12; 2014; 2016	
