= Shuxian Jin =

Chinese figure skater (born 2011)

Jin Shuxian
Personal information
- Born: June 25, 2011 (age 15) Heilongjiang, China
- Home town: Beijing, China
- Height: 1.55 m (5 ft 1 in)

Figure skating career
- Country: China
- Coach: Jialei Wang; Sofia Fedchenko
- Skating club: Beijing Century Star Skating Club
- Began skating: 2016

Medal record
Chinese Championships
Gold medal – first place	2026 Harbin	Singles
Gold medal – first place	2025 Chengde	Singles
Silver medal – second place	2024 Chengde	Singles

Jin Shuxian (Chinese: 金淑贤; born 25 June 2011) is a Chinese figure skater. She is the 2026 JGP in Turkey silver medalist and the 2026 JGP in China bronze medalist.

Domestically, she is a two-time Chinese senior national champion (2025, 26).

== Personal life ==
Jin was born on 25 June, 2011, in Beijing, China.

== Career ==
=== Early career ===
Jin began skating in 2016 at the age of five years old. She debuted on the senior level of 14th National Winter Games of China, where she won gold. Jin later competed in the senior level of the Chinese Figure Skating Championships and won the silver medal.

=== 2024–25 season: National champion, Junior Grand Prix debut ===
Jin made her Junior Grand Prix and international debut at the Grand Prix stage in China, placing fourth overall.

In November, Jin participated in both the senior and junior level of the Chinese Figure Skating Championships, winning gold in both categories.

=== 2025–26 season ===
Jin opened her season at the Junior Grand Prix stage in Thailand, placing fifth overall. Jin later defended her senior national title, alongside earning silver in the junior category.

=== 2026–27 season: Junior Grand Prix medals ===
Competing at Junior Grand Prix stages in China and Turkey, Jin placed third and second respectively, qualifying her for the upcoming Junior Grand Prix Final.

== Programs ==
Season	Short program	Free skating
2026–27	KOOZA Dance (from "Cirque Du Soleil") choreo. by Adam Solya	Exogenesis: Symphony, Pt. 3: Redemption; Exogenesis: Symphony, Pt. 1: Overture by Muse choreo. by Benoît Richaud
2025–26	KOOZA Dance (from "Cirque Du Soleil") choreo. by Adam Solya	Butterfly Lovers; Violin Concerto choreo. by Adam Solya
2024–25	Jonetsu Tairiku choreo. by Yeaji Shin	Arirang Rhapsody/Homage to Korea" (new mix) performed by Song So-hee choreo. by Jialei Wang

== Competitive highlights ==
- JGP – Event of the ISU Grand Prix
- JGP – Event of the ISU Junior Grand Prix
- TBD – Assigned

=== Senior level ===
Competition placements at senior level
Season	2022-23	2023–24	2024–25	2025–26	2026–27
Chinese Championships	4th	2nd	1st	1st	
Chinese National Winter Games		1st			

=== Junior level ===
Competition placements at junior level
Season	2024-25	2025–26	2026–27
Chinese Championships	1st	2nd	
Junior Grand Prix Final			TBD
JGP China	4th		3rd
JGP Thailand		5th	
JGP Turkey			2nd
