= Wang Xuehan =

Chinese pair skater

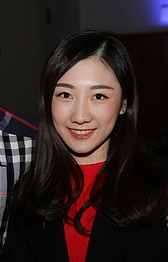

Personal information
- Born: June 1, 1998 (age 28) Beijing, China
- Height: 1.60 m (5 ft 3 in)

Figure skating career
- Country: China
- Skating club: Beijing Century Star SC
- Began skating: 2005

Wang Xuehan (Chinese: 王雪涵; pinyin: Wáng Xuěhán; born June 1, 1998) is a Chinese pair skater. With partner Wang Lei, she is a bronze medalist at three Grand Prix events – 2014 Trophée Éric Bompard, 2014 Cup of China, and 2016 NHK Trophy – and the 2016 Chinese national champion.

== Personal life ==
Wang was born on June 1, 1998, in Beijing. Her mother teaches English.

== Career ==
=== Partnership with Wang ===
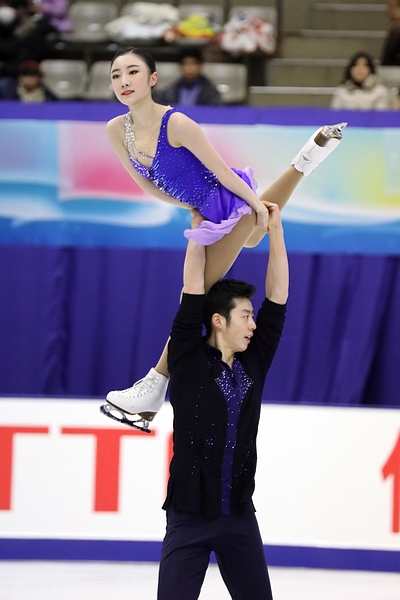
Wang/Wang at the 2016 NHK Trophy

Wang started skating in 2005 at a rink in a shopping mall. Her partnership with Wang Lei began in 2012. The pair won the bronze medal at the 2013 Chinese Championships.

Making their Grand Prix debut, the Wangs placed fourth at the 2013 Cup of China. They finished fourth at the 2014 Chinese Championships.

The following season, the Wangs were awarded bronze at both of their Grand Prix events – 2014 Cup of China and 2014 Trophée Éric Bompard. They took the silver medal at the 2015 Chinese Championships.

In the 2015–16 season, the pair placed fifth at the 2015 Skate America and fourth at the 2015 Cup of China. They were selected to compete at their first ISU Championship – the 2016 Worlds in Boston. Ranked 15th in the short program and 14th in the free skate, they finished 15th overall.

They were fourth at the 2016 Cup of China and won the bronze medal at the 2016 NHK Trophy. Due to injury, they did not compete again until the 2018-19 Chinese National Games, where they placed second.

In September 2020, it was announced that Wang/Wang had split.

== Programs ==
(with Wang Lei)

Season	Short program	Free skating	Exhibition
2016–17	Steppin' Out with My Baby performed by the Jumpin' Joz Band choreo. by David Wilson	Love Is A Many-Splendored Thing by Sammy Fain choreo. by David Wilson	Hurt performed by Wei Zhang
2015–16	Romance by Gavriel Lipkind & Alexandra Lubchansky choreo. by David Wilson	My Fair Lady by Frederick Loewe choreo. by David Wilson	The Prayer by Celine Dion, Andrea Bocelli
2014–15	Romance by Gavriel Lipkind & Alexandra Lubchansky choreo. by David Wilson	My Fair Lady by Frederick Loewe choreo. by David Wilson	Wishing You Were Somehow Here Again by Andrew Lloyd Webber
2013–14	The Swan by Camille Saint-Saëns choreo. by Helen Jiang	Singin' in the Rain by Nacio Herb Brown choreo. by Helen Jiang	Wishing You Were Somehow Here Again by Andrew Lloyd Webber

== Competitive highlights ==
- GP – Event of the ISU Grand Prix Series
- Medals at team events are awarded for the team results only. Individual placements at team events are listed in parentheses.

=== Pair skating with Lei Wang ===
Competition placements at senior level
Season	2012–13	2013–14	2014–15	2015–16	2016–17	2017–18	2018–19
World Championships				15th			
Chinese Championships	3rd	4th	2nd	1st		3rd	2nd
GP Cup of China		4th	3rd	4th	4th		
GP NHK Trophy					3rd		
GP Skate America				5th			
GP Trophée Éric Bompard			3rd				
Chinese Winter Games				2nd			
Team Challenge Cup				3rd (4th)			

== Detailed Results ==
Current personal best scores are highlighted in bold.

=== With Wang ===
**2018–2019 season**
Date	Event	SP	FS	Total
December 29–30, 2018	2019 Chinese Championships	3; 62.79	2; 124.02	2; 186.81
**2016–2017 season**
Date	Event	SP	FS	Total
November 18–20, 2016	2016 Cup of China	4; 66.45	4; 115.57	4; 182.02
November 25–27, 2016	2016 NHK Trophy	3; 65.66	3; **119.66**	3; 185.32
**2015–2016 season**
Date	Event	SP	FS	Total
April 22–24, 2016	2016 Team Challenge Cup	–	4; 118.78	4P/3T; 118.78
March 28–April 3, 2016	2016 World Championships	15; 57.32	14; 111.33	15; 168.65
December 26–27, 2015	2016 Chinese Championships	1; 69.17	1; 117.28	1; 186.45
November 5–8, 2015	2015 Cup of China	4; **69.36**	4; 117.40	4; **186.76**
October 23–25, 2015	2015 Skate America	3; 64.95	6; 106.82	5; 171.77
**2014–2015 season**
Date	Event	SP	FS	Total
December 27–28, 2014	2015 Chinese Championships	2; 62.57	2; 123.15	2; 185.72
November 21–23, 2014	2014 Trophée Éric Bompard	3; 63.25	4; 118.72	3; 181.97
November 7–9, 2014	2014 Cup of China	2; 57.27	3; 114.88	3; 172.15
**2013–2014 season**
Date	Event	SP	FS	Total
December 28–29, 2013	2014 Chinese Championships	5; 55.21	4; 100.79	4; 156.00
November 1–3, 2013	2013 Cup of China	5; 57.16	4; 115.19	4; 172.35
**2012–2013 season**
Date	Event	SP	FS	Total
December 20–21, 2012	2013 Chinese Championships	4; 45.27	3; 94.15	3; 139.42
