= 2016 Cup of China =

2016 Audi Cup of China
- Type: Grand Prix
- Date: November 18 – 20
- Season: 2016–17
- Location: Beijing
- Venue: Capital Gymnasium

Champions
- Men's singles: (Canada) Patrick Chan
- Ladies' singles: (Russia) Elena Radionova
- Pairs: (China) Yu Xiaoyu / Zhang Hao
- Ice dance: (United States) Maia Shibutani / Alex Shibutani
- Previous: 2015 Cup of China
- Next: 2017 Cup of China
- Previous Grand Prix: 2016 Trophée de France
- Next Grand Prix: 2016 NHK Trophy

The 2016 Audi Cup of China was the fifth event of six in the 2016–17 ISU Grand Prix of Figure Skating, a senior-level international invitational competition series. It was held at the Capital Gymnasium in Beijing on November 18–20. Medals were awarded in the disciplines of men's singles, ladies' singles, pair skating, and ice dancing. Skaters earned points toward qualifying for the 2016–17 Grand Prix Final.

== Entries ==
The ISU published the preliminary assignments on June 30, 2016.

Country	Men	Ladies	Pairs	Ice dancing
Canada	Patrick Chan	Kaetlyn Osmond	Liubov Ilyushechkina / Dylan Moscovitch	Alexandra Paul / Mitchell Islam; Kaitlyn Weaver / Andrew Poje
China	Jin Boyang; Yan Han	Li Xiangning; Li Zijun; Zhao Ziquan	Peng Cheng / Jin Yang; Wang Xuehan / Wang Lei; Yu Xiaoyu / Zhang Hao	Chen Hong / Zhao Yan; Song Linshu / Sun Zhuoming; Wang Shiyue / Liu Xinyu
Czech Republic	Michal Březina			
Germany			Mari Vartmann / Ruben Blommaert	
Israel	Daniel Samohin			
Italy			Nicole Della Monica / Matteo Guarise	
Japan		Rika Hongo; Mai Mihara		
Poland				Natalia Kaliszek / Maksym Spodyriev
Russia	Maxim Kovtun; Alexander Petrov; Sergei Voronov	Elena Radionova; Elizaveta Tuktamysheva	Yuko Kavaguti / Alexander Smirnov	Victoria Sinitsina / Nikita Katsalapov; Alexandra Stepanova / Ivan Bukin
Sweden		Joshi Helgesson		
United States	Max Aaron; Ross Miner	Karen Chen; Courtney Hicks; Ashley Wagner	Jessica Pfund / Joshua Santillan	Anastasia Cannuscio / Colin McManus; Maia Shibutani / Alex Shibutani

=== Changes to initial assignments ===
Date	Discipline	Withdrew	Added	Reason/Other notes	Refs
September 1	Men	N/A	(China) Zhang He	Host pick	
September 1	Ladies	N/A	(China) Li Xiangning	Host pick	
September 1	Ice dancing	N/A	(China) Li Xibei / Xiang Guangyao	Host pick	
September 28 and 30	Pairs	(United States) Alexa Scimeca / Chris Knierim	(United States) Jessica Pfund / Joshua Santillan	Illness (Scimeca)	
October 17	Ice dancing	(China) Li Xibei / Xiang Guangyao	(China) Song Linshu / Sun Zhuoming		
October 17	Pairs	(China) Sui Wenjing / Han Cong	(China) Wang Xuehan / Wang Lei	Injury (Sui)	
October 27; November 9	Men	(China) Zhang He	Not replaced		
November 9	Men	(Japan) Daisuke Murakami	Not replaced	Injury	

== Results ==
=== Men ===
Rank	Name	Nation	Total points	SP		FS	
1	Patrick Chan	Canada	279.72	3	83.41	1	196.31
2	Jin Boyang	China	278.54	1	96.17	2	182.37
3	Sergei Voronov	Russia	243.76	4	82.93	4	160.83
4	Max Aaron	United States	242.74	5	81.67	3	161.07
5	Yan Han	China	230.19	8	75.04	5	155.15
6	Alexander Petrov	Russia	228.44	9	74.21	6	154.23
7	Maxim Kovtun	Russia	221.43	10	70.10	7	151.33
8	Daniel Samohin	Israel	213.51	2	83.47	10	130.04
9	Ross Miner	United States	213.34	6	76.73	8	136.61
10	Michal Březina	Czech Republic	211.77	7	75.86	9	135.91

=== Ladies ===
Rank	Name	Nation	Total points	SP		FS	
1	Elena Radionova	Russia	205.90	2	70.75	1	135.15
2	Kaetlyn Osmond	Canada	196.00	1	72.20	3	123.80
3	Elizaveta Tuktamysheva	Russia	192.57	4	64.88	2	127.69
4	Mai Mihara	Japan	190.92	3	68.48	4	122.44
5	Rika Hongo	Japan	181.75	6	63.63	6	118.12
6	Ashley Wagner	United States	181.38	5	64.36	7	117.02
7	Karen Chen	United States	179.39	9	58.28	5	121.11
8	Li Zijun	China	172.40	7	61.32	8	111.08
9	Courtney Hicks	United States	163.64	8	59.86	9	103.78
10	Li Xiangning	China	157.27	11	54.55	10	102.72
11	Zhao Ziquan	China	149.12	10	58.20	12	90.92
12	Joshi Helgesson	Sweden	144.64	12	49.25	11	95.39

=== Pairs ===
Rank	Name	Nation	Total points	SP		FS	
1	Yu Xiaoyu / Zhang Hao	China	203.76	1	72.49	1	131.27
2	Peng Cheng / Jin Yang	China	197.96	3	69.93	2	128.03
3	Liubov Ilyushechkina / Dylan Moscovitch	Canada	191.54	2	71.28	3	120.26
4	Wang Xuehan / Wang Lei	China	182.02	4	66.45	4	115.57
5	Nicole Della Monica / Matteo Guarise	Italy	176.38	5	66.39	7	109.99
6	Yuko Kavaguti / Alexander Smirnov	Russia	175.53	6	62.90	6	112.63
7	Mari Vartmann / Ruben Blommaert	Germany	173.88	7	60.88	5	113.00
8	Jessica Pfund / Joshua Santillan	United States	142.41	8	50.32	8	92.09

=== Ice dancing ===
Rank	Name	Nation	Total points	SD		FD	
1	Maia Shibutani / Alex Shibutani	United States	185.13	2	73.23	1	111.90
2	Kaitlyn Weaver / Andrew Poje	Canada	181.54	1	73.78	2	107.76
3	Alexandra Stepanova / Ivan Bukin	Russia	177.41	3	72.09	3	105.32
4	Victoria Sinitsina / Nikita Katsalapov	Russia	171.94	4	70.24	4	101.70
5	Natalia Kaliszek / Maksym Spodyriev	Poland	150.78	5	60.13	6	90.65
6	Wang Shiyue / Liu Xinyu	China	149.80	6	58.57	5	91.23
7	Anastasia Cannuscio / Colin McManus	United States	141.17	7	53.43	7	87.74
8	Song Linshu / Sun Zhuoming	China	130.90	8	53.20	8	77.70
9	Chen Hong / Zhao Yan	China	117.32	9	51.54	9	65.78
WD	Alexandra Paul / Mitchell Islam	Canada	withdrew	withdrew from competition			
