= Wang Jiayue =

Chinese ice dancer

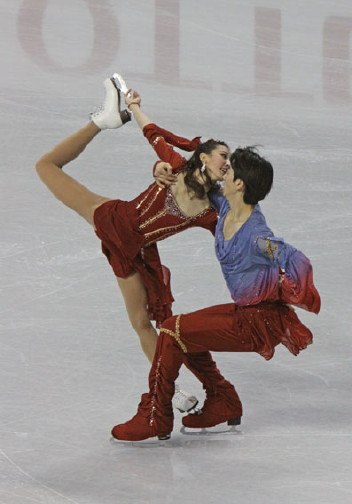
- Wang & Gao in 2009.

Personal information
- Full name: Wang Jiayue
- Born: April 14, 1988 (age 38) Harbin
- Height: 168 cm (5.51 ft)

Figure skating career
- Country: China
- Partner: Gao Chongbo
- Coach: Bing Han

Wang Jiayue (simplified Chinese: 王佳悦; traditional Chinese: 王佳悅; pinyin: Wáng Jiayuè; born April 14, 1988, in Harbin, Heilongjiang) is a Chinese ice dancer. With former partner Meng Fei, she is the 2006 Chinese bronze medalist. They placed 12th at the 2005 Four Continents Championships. Their partnership ended in 2006.

She teamed up with Gao Chongbo in 2008. They placed 9th at the 2009 Four Continents Championships

== Competitive highlights ==
(with Gao)

Competition	2008–2009
Four Continents Championships	9th

(with Meng)

Competition	2001–2002	2002–2003	2003–2004	2004–2005	2005–2006
Four Continents Championships				12th	
Chinese Championships	5th		5th		3rd
Skate Canada International				12th	
Cup of China			12th		
Junior Grand Prix, China		11th			
