= Xi Hongyan =

Chinese ice dancer

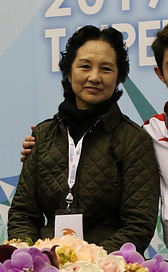
- Xi Hongyan at the 2017 Junior World Championships

Personal information
- Born: 17 March 1964 (age 62)

Figure skating career
- Country: China

Xi Hongyan (born March 17, 1964) is a Chinese ice dancer. She competed at the 1984 Winter Olympics with partner Zhao Xiaolei and placed 19th. She was 19 at the time.

Following her retirement from competitive skating, she became a coach. Her current and former students include Huang Xintong & Zheng Xun, Guo Jiameimei & Meng Fei, Yu Xiaoyang & Wang Chen, and Qi Jia & Sun Xu.
