= Wu Jialiang =

Chinese figure skater

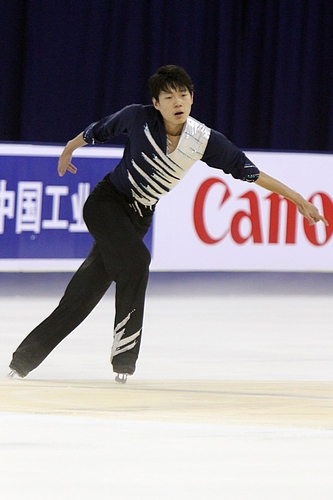
- Wu in 2011.

Personal information
- Full name: Wu Jialiang
- Born: June 23, 1985 (age 41) Harbin
- Height: 1.80 m (5 ft 11 in)

Figure skating career
- Country: China
- Coach: Yu Lijie
- Skating club: Heilongjiang Skating Club
- Retired: 2012
Medal record
Men's Figure skating
Representing China
National Games
Silver medal – second place	2009 Qingdao	Men's singles
Bronze medal – third place	2012 Changchun	Men's singles

Wu Jialiang (simplified Chinese: 吴家亮; traditional Chinese: 吳家亮; pinyin: Wú Jiāliàng; born June 23, 1985, in Harbin, Heilongjiang) is a Chinese former competitive figure skater. He is the 2008 and 2009 Chinese national champion.

Wu was born in Harbin, and lives in Beijing. He started skating in 1989. He is coached by Yu Lijie.

== Competitive highlights ==
Results
International
Event	00–01	01–02	02–03	03–04	05–06	06–07	07–08	08–09	09–10	10–11	11–12
Worlds						23rd		28th			
Four Continents					10th	6th	10th	10th	8th	8th	16th
GP Bompard								8th			
GP Cup of China					10th	8th	9th	6th		10th	8th
GP NHK Trophy						8th				7th	
GP Skate America									11th		
GP Skate Canada							11th				
Asian Games						5th				5th	
Universiade						8th		4th			
Nebelhorn									19th		
International: Junior
Junior Worlds			8th	26th							
JGP China			3rd								
JGP Czech				8th							
JGP Poland	12th										
JGP Slovenia				8th							
National
National Games					8th			2nd			3rd
Chinese Champ.					3rd	3rd	1st	5th	4th	3rd	2nd
Team events
World Team								6T / 9P			
GP = Grand Prix; JGP = Junior Grand Prix; T = Team result; P = Personal result; medals awarded for team result only.
