= Guan Yuhang =

Chinese figure skater (born 1993)

Personal information
- Born: July 1, 1993 (age 33) Harbin, China
- Height: 1.76 m (5 ft 9 1/2 in)

Figure skating career
- Country: China
- Coach: Jia Shuguang
- Skating club: Harbin Training Centre
- Began skating: 1999

Guan Yuhang (born July 1, 1993) is a Chinese figure skater. He won bronze medals at the 2011 Asian Trophy and 2015 Chinese Championships. He made his senior Grand Prix debut at the 2014 Cup of China and his ISU Championship debut at the 2015 Four Continents.

== Programs ==
Season	Short program	Free skating
2014–2015	Bon Voyage; Conquest of Paradise by Vangelis	Mi Mancherai (from Il Postino) by Luis Bacalov performed by Josh Groban; Violin Concerto in D major by Pyotr Ilyich Tchaikovsky
2010–2011	Mr. & Mrs. Smith by John Powell	Rock Prelude by David Garrett

== Competitive highlights ==
GP: Grand Prix; CS: Challenger Series; JGP: Junior Grand Prix

International
Event	10–11	11–12	13–14	14–15	15–16	16–17
Four Continents				21st		
GP Cup of China				10th		
Asian Trophy		3rd				
Universiade						10th
International: Junior
JGP Austria	12th					
National
Chinese NG					5th	
Chinese Champ.	9th	11th	5th	3rd	5th	2nd
WD = Withdrew
