= Zhao Yan (figure skater) =

Chinese ice dancer

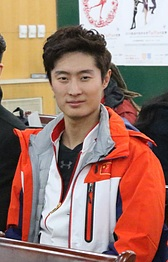

Personal information
- Born: July 23, 1992 (age 34) Harbin, China
- Height: 1.90 m (6 ft 3 in)

Figure skating career
- Country: China
- Partner: Chen Hong
- Coach: Xi Hongyan, Zheng Xun
- Skating club: Harbin Winter Sports Training Center
- Began skating: 2000

Zhao Yan (born July 23, 1992) is a Chinese ice dancer. With his skating partner, Chen Hong, he is the 2017 Asian Winter Games bronze medalist and 2017 Chinese national champion. The two made their Grand Prix debut at the 2016 Cup of China. They placed tenth at the 2017 Four Continents Championships in Gangneung, South Korea.

== Programs ==
(with Chen)

Season	Short dance	Free dance
2017–2018	Rhumba and Samba: Despacito (remix) by Dj Max Star	Ne me quitte pas
2016–2017	Blues: Mon mec à moi performed by Patricia Kaas; Swing: Pigalle performed by Patricia Kaas	Un peu plus haut performed by Lisa Angel; Thunder and Lightning performed by Ezio Bosso; Charms (from W.E.) by Abel Korzeniowski
2015–2016	Howl's Moving Castle by Joe Hisaishi; On the Street Where You Live (from My Fair Lady by Frederick Loewe	Notre-Dame de Paris by Riccardo Cocciante
2014–2015	Paso doble	Ghost

== Competitive highlights ==
GP: Grand Prix; CS: Challenger Series

With Chen

International
Event	12–13	13–14	14–15	15–16	16–17	17–18
Four Continents					10th	
GP Cup of China					9th	9th
Asian Games					3rd	
Universiade			5th		6th	
National
Chinese Champ.	4th	8th	3rd	2nd	1st	
