= Chen Hong (figure skater) =

Chinese ice dancer

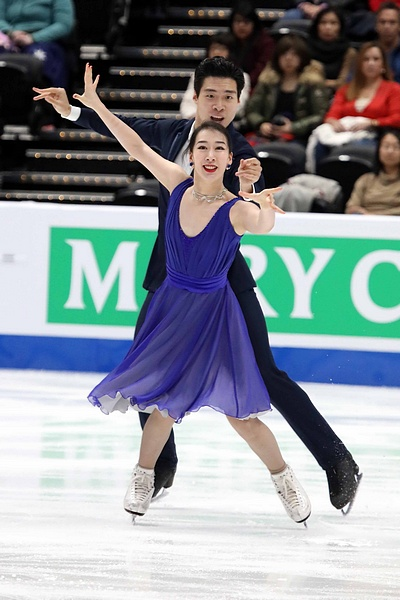
- Chen and Sun at the 2019 Four Continents Championships

Personal information
- Native name: 陈宏
- Born: February 11, 1994 (age 32) Harbin, China
- Home town: Harbin, China
- Height: 1.65 m (5 ft 5 in)

Figure skating career
- Country: China
- Partner: Sun Zhuoming
- Coach: Marie-France Dubreuil, Patrice Lauzon, Romain Haguenauer
- Skating club: Harbin Winter Sports Training Center
- Began skating: 2000

Chen Hong (born February 11, 1994) is a Chinese ice dancer and ice dancing coach. She began competing with Sun Zhuoming in the 2018–19 season, winning the silver medal at the 2019 Chinese Figure Skating Championships.

With her former skating partner, Zhao Yan, she is the 2017 Asian Winter Games bronze medalist and 2017 Chinese national champion. The two made their Grand Prix debut at the 2016 Cup of China. They placed tenth at the 2017 Four Continents Championships in Gangneung, South Korea.

== Programs ==
=== With Sun ===
| Season | Rhythm dance | Free dance | Exhibition |
|---|---|---|---|
| 2021–2022 | Blues: More performed by Alex Vargas; Hip Hop: More (RedOne Jimmy Joker Remix) by Usher | All I Ask of You; Overture (from The Phantom of the Opera) by Andrew Lloyd Webber | |
| 2020–2021 | Quickstep: The Greatest Showman | I Will Wait for You (from The Umbrellas of Cherbourg) by Michel Legrand | The Brightest Star in the Night Sky by Escape Plan |
| 2019–2020 | Swing: It Don't Mean a Thing (If It Ain't Got That Swing) by Duke Ellington; Foxtrot: Swing! | It's All Coming Back to Me Now by Jim Steinman performed by Meat Loaf & Marion Raven | |
| 2018–2019 | Tango: Koozå Dance by Jean-Francois Côté performed by Cirque du Soleil | I Will Wait for You (from The Umbrellas of Cherbourg) by Michel Legrand | |

=== With Zhao ===
| Season | Short dance | Free dance |
|---|---|---|
| 2017–2018 | Rhumba and Samba: Despacito (remix) by Dj Max Star | Ne me quitte pas |
| 2016–2017 | Blues: Mon mec à moi; Swing: Pigalle both performed by Patricia Kaas | Un peu plus haut performed by Lisa Angel; Thunder and Lightning performed by Ezio Bosso; Charms (from W.E.) by Abel Korzeniowski |
| 2015–2016 | Howl's Moving Castle by Joe Hisaishi; On the Street Where You Live (from My Fair Lady by Frederick Loewe | Notre-Dame de Paris by Riccardo Cocciante |
| 2014–2015 | Paso doble | Ghost |

== Competitive highlights ==
GP: Grand Prix; CS: Challenger Series

=== With Sun ===
International
| Event | 18–19 | 19–20 | 20–21 | 21–22 |
|---|---|---|---|---|
| Four Continents | 8th | 10th | | |
| GP Skate America | | 10th | | |
| GP Cup of China | | 8th | 2nd | C |
| GP Italy | | | | 9th |
| CS Autumn Classic | 5th | | | WD |
| Lake Placid IDI | | 8th | | |
| Toruń Cup | 5th | 6th | | |
National
| Chinese Champ. | 2nd | 2nd | | |
TBD = Assigned; WD = Withdrew; C = Event cancelled

=== With Zhao ===
International
| Event | 12–13 | 13–14 | 14–15 | 15–16 | 16–17 | 17–18 |
|---|---|---|---|---|---|---|
| Four Continents | | | | | 10th | |
| GP Cup of China | | | | | 9th | 9th |
| Asian Games | | | | | 3rd | |
| Universiade | | | 5th | | 6th | |
National
| Chinese Champ. | 4th | 8th | 3rd | 2nd | 1st | |

== Coaching era ==
As at the 2022-23 figure skating season, Chen Hong currently coaches the following ice dance teams:

- (China) Zhang Meihong / Meng Bolin (2022 Chinese nationals bronze medalist)
