= Wang Huan (figure skater) =

Chinese former figure skater (born 1983)

Personal information
- Born: September 10, 1983 (age 42)
- Height: 164 cm (5 ft 5 in)

Figure skating career
- Country: China
- Skating club: Changchun Skating Club
- Retired: 2003

Wang Huan (born September 10, 1983 in Changchun, China) is a Chinese former figure skater. She is the 1999 Chinese national champion and 2000 national bronze medalist. She is a two-time competitor in ISU Championships, placing 18th at the 1998 World Junior Figure Skating Championships and 15th at the 2001 Four Continents Championships. She won bronze medals at the 1997 Asian Championships and at the 1998 Junior Grand Prix event in Beijing. She also placed 6th at the 1999 Asian Winter Games.

== Results ==
Event	1996-1997	1997-1998	1998-1999	1999-2000	2000-2001	2001-2002	2002-2003
Four Continents Championships					15th		
Asian Winter Games			6th				
Asian Championships	3rd						
Chinese Championships			1st	3rd	4th		4th
