= Wu Nan =

Chinese ice dancer

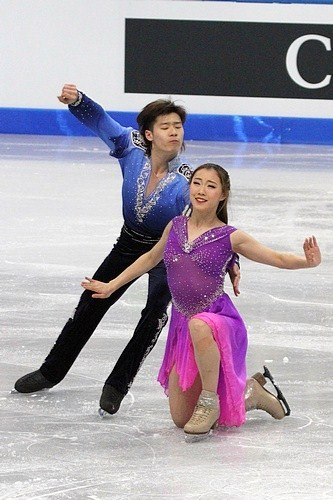

Personal information
- Full name: Wu Nan
- Born: December 9, 1991 (age 34) Changchun, Jilin
- Home town: Beijing
- Height: 1.75 m (5 ft 9 in)

Figure skating career
- Country: China
- Partner: Shi Shang
- Coach: Gao Chongbo
- Skating club: Century Star SC

Wu Nan (simplified Chinese: 吴楠; traditional Chinese: 吳楠; pinyin: Wú Nán; born December 9, 1991, in Beijing) is a Chinese ice dancer. His partner is Shi Shang.

== Programs ==
=== With Shi ===
Season	Short dance	Free dance	Exhibition
2023–2024	Thriller; Dancing Machine; Thriller by Michael Jackson	Exogenesis: Symphony (Parts 1-3) by Muse	Exile by Taylor Swift & Bon Iver

=== With Zhang ===
Season	Short dance	Free dance
2015–2016	Waltz by Cristina Elisa; Love by Patrick Doyle	Toccata and Fugue in D minor, BWV 565 by Johann Sebastian Bach performed by Vanessa-Mae
2014–2015	Paso Doble: Un Amor by Gipsy Kings; Flamenco: Cancion Triste; Flamenco: Patio	The Prince of Egypt by Hans Zimmer
2012–2013	Blues: Your Heart Is As Black As Night by Melody Gardot; Hip Hop: Overpowered by Roisin Murphy	Un Giorno Per Noi (from "Romeo and Juliet") by Nino Rota
2011–2012	Corazon Espinado by Santana; Ya Lo Se Que Tu Te Vas by Vicente Fernandez; Living la Vida Loca by Ricky Martin	Un Giorno Per Noi (from "Romeo and Juliet") by Nino Rota
2010–2011	Por Una Cabeza; Hong Kong Waltz by Ronghua Liu	Ashes of Time Redux by Chen Xunqi
	Original dance	
2009–2010	Chinese folk: Notturno in the Fisherboat by Cao Zheng	The Voice of Enigma

== Competitive highlights ==
=== With Shang ===
International
Event	19–20	23–24
Four Continents		13th
GP Cup of China		9th
CS Budapest Trophy		12th
National
Chinese Champ.	5th	2nd
TBD = Assigned; WD = Withdrew

=== With Zhang ===
International
Event	2009–10	2010–11	2011–12	2012–13	2013–14	2014–15	2015–16
Four Continents					8th	WD	13th
GP Cup of China						7th	
International: Junior
Junior Worlds	25th	21st	14th	18th			
JGP Austria			12th				
JGP Hungary	9th						
JGP Italy			10th				
JGP Japan		6th					
JGP Turkey	9th						
National
Chinese Champ.	6th	4th	3rd		4th		3rd
WD = Withdrew; GP = Grand Prix; JGP = Junior Grand Prix
