= Sun Zhuoming =

Chinese ice dancer

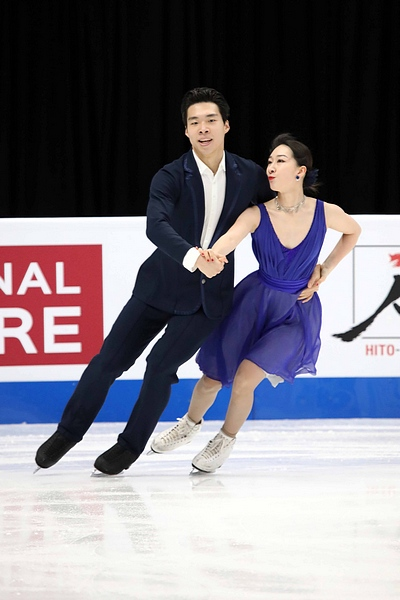
- Chen and Sun at the 2019 Four Continents Championships

Personal information
- Native name: 孙茁鸣
- Born: August 11, 1995 (age 31) Changchun, China
- Home town: Changchun, China
- Height: 1.84 m (6 ft 1/2 in)

Figure skating career
- Country: China
- Partner: Chen Hong
- Coach: Marie-France Dubreuil, Patrice Lauzon, Romain Haguenauer
- Skating club: Jilin Winter Sports Management Center
- Began skating: 2000

Sun Zhuoming (born August 11, 1995) is a Chinese ice dancer and ice dancing coach. He began competing with Chen Hong in the 2018–19 season. Together, they are the 2019 Chinese national silver medalists.

With his former skating partner, Song Linshu, he is the 2018 Chinese national silver medalist. They competed twice at the Four Continents Championships and at 2016 Cup of China. He also competed with Cong Yue at the national level earlier in his career.

== Programs ==
=== With Chen ===
Season	Rhythm dance	Free dance	Exhibition
2021–2022	Blues: More performed by Alex Vargas; Hip Hop: More (RedOne Jimmy Joker Remix) by Usher	All I Ask of You; Overture (from The Phantom of the Opera) by Andrew Lloyd Webber	
2020–2021	Quickstep: The Greatest Showman	I Will Wait for You (from The Umbrellas of Cherbourg) by Michel Legrand	The Brightest Star in the Night Sky by Escape Plan
2019–2020	Swing: It Don't Mean a Thing (If It Ain't Got That Swing) by Duke Ellington; Foxtrot: Swing!	It's All Coming Back to Me Now by Jim Steinman performed by Meat Loaf & Marion Raven	
2018–2019	Tango: Koozå Dance by Jean-Francois Côté performed by Cirque du Soleil	I Will Wait for You (from The Umbrellas of Cherbourg) by Michel Legrand	

=== With Song ===
Season	Short dance	Free dance
2017–2018	Rhumba: Whatever Happens by Michael Jackson; Samba: Waka Waka	Adele medley; Make You Feel My Love; Rolling in the Deep
2016–2017	Blues: Halo; Hip hop: Single Ladies (Put a Ring on It) by Beyoncé	Skyfall soundtrack by Thomas Newman performed by Adele

=== With Cong ===
Season	Short dance	Free dance
2015–2016	March; Waltz	Michael Bublé medley

== Competitive highlights ==
GP: Grand Prix; CS: Challenger Series

=== With Chen ===
International
Event	18–19	19–20	20–21	21–22
Four Continents	8th	10th		
GP Skate America		10th		
GP Cup of China		8th	2nd	C
GP Italy				9th
CS Autumn Classic	5th			TBD
Lake Placid IDI		8th		
Toruń Cup	5th	6th		
National
Chinese Champ.	2nd	2nd		
TBD = Assigned; WD = Withdrew

=== With Song ===
International
Event	16–17	17–18
Four Continents	11th	12th
GP Cup of China	8th	
National
Chinese Champ.		2nd

=== With Cong ===
International
Event	13–14	14–15	15–16
GP Cup of China			WD
National
Chinese Champ.	7th	7th	5th
WD = Withdrew

== Coaching era ==
As at the 2022-23 figure skating season, Sun Zhuoming currently coaches the following ice dance teams:

- (China) Xiao Zixi / Wang Yi
