= Song Lun =

Chinese figure skater (born 1981)

Personal information
- Born: January 18, 1981 (age 45) Qiqihar, China
- Height: 175 cm (5 ft 9 in)

Figure skating career
- Country: China
- Coach: Lijie Yu (于丽杰)

Song Lun (Chinese: 宋伦, born January 18, 1981, in Qiqihar) is a Chinese figure skater. He is the 2005 Winter Universiade silver medalist and a two-time Chinese national medalist (silver in 2004, bronze in 2002). His highest placement at an ISU Championship was 7th, achieved at the 2005 Four Continents.

== Programs ==
Season	Short program	Free skating
2005–06	Blue Men by Blue Men	The Day After Tomorrow by Harald Kloser
2004–05	Sarabande by George Frideric Handel	Lord of the Dance by Ronan Hardiman
2003–04	Spiderman by Paul Francis Webster	Feet of Flames; Lord of the Dance by Ronan Hardiman

== Results ==
GP: Grand Prix

International
Event	2002–03	2003–04	2004–05	2005–06
Four Continents		10th	7th	13th
Skate America			6th	10th
Cup of China			4th	
Golden Spin		6th		
Universiade			2nd	
National
Chinese Champ.	3rd	7th	2nd	
