= Ghost (soundtrack) =

1990 soundtrack album by Maurice Jarre

Soundtrack album by various artists
- Length: 55:33
- Label: Milan

Ghost is the official soundtrack, on the Milan Records label, of the 1990 Academy Award- and Golden Globe-winning film Ghost starring Patrick Swayze, Demi Moore and Whoopi Goldberg (who won the Academy Award for Best Supporting Actress for her role as "Oda Mae Brown" in this film) and Tony Goldwyn. The score composed by Maurice Jarre contains traditional orchestra and electronic instruments.

The album was nominated for the Academy Award for Best Original Score.

== Track listing ==
1. The Righteous Brothers - "Unchained Melody" - 3:37
2. "Ghost" - 7:24
3. "Sam" - 5:33
4. "Ditto" - 3:19
5. "Carl" - 4:06
6. "Molly" - 6:17
7. "Unchained Melody" (Orchestral Version) - 3:59
8. "End Credits" - 4:17
9. "Fire Escape" (bonus) - 3:12
10. "Oda Mae & Carl" (bonus) - 3:58
11. "Maurice Jarre Interview" (bonus) - 9:51

== Reception ==
Professional ratings
Review scores
Source	Rating
Allmusic	3/5 stars
Filmtracks	3/5 stars

AllMusic and Filmtracks rated the soundtrack album three out of five stars.

Christian Clemmensen of Filmtracks gave the score a mixed assessment, praising Jarre's romantic main theme as one of the finest of his later career and highlighting the instrumental adaptation of "Unchained Melody". However, he criticised much of the remaining underscore for its dissonant and dated electronic clangs which "continue for lengthy sequences", describing the suspense material as grinding and occasionally more suggestive of a horror score.

Stephen Thomas Erlewine of AllMusic also gave the soundtrack a mixed review, describing it as a "haphazard affair". He praised "Unchained Melody" and some of Jarre's incidental music, though he felt that the material did not come together as a cohesive listening experience.

== Certifications and sales ==
Region	Certification	Certified units/sales
Australia (ARIA)	Gold	35,000^{^}
Brazil	—	150,000
Japan (RIAJ)	Gold	100,000^{^}
Spain (Promusicae)	3× Platinum	300,000^{^}
United States (RIAA)	Platinum	1,000,000^{^}
^{^} Shipments figures based on certification alone.
