= Zhang Min (figure skater) =

Chinese figure skater (born 1976)

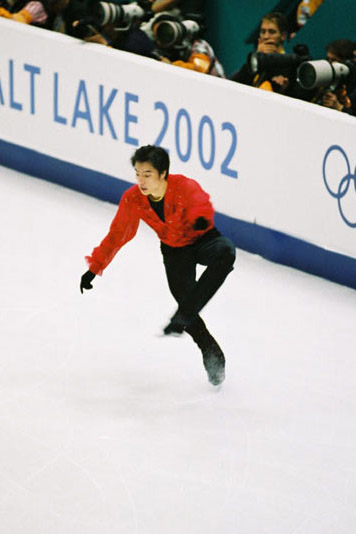
- Zhang at the 2002 Winter Olympics

Personal information
- Born: 24 March 1976 (age 50) Qiqihar, Heilongjiang
- Height: 1.76 m (5 ft 9 in)

Figure skating career
- Country: China
- Skating club: Qiqihar Skating Club
- Began skating: 1980
- Retired: 2006
Medal record
Figure skating: Men's singles
Representing China
Four Continents Championships
Silver medal – second place	2003 Beijing	Singles
Bronze medal – third place	2000 Osaka	Singles
Asian Winter Games
Silver medal – second place	1996 Sapporo	Singles
Bronze medal – third place	2003 Aomori	Singles

Zhang Min (simplified Chinese: 张民; traditional Chinese: 張民; pinyin: Zhāng Mín; born 24 March 1976) is a Chinese former competitive figure skater. He is a two-time Four Continents medalist and a three-time Chinese national champion. He competed at three Winter Olympic Games, placing as high as tenth, and finished a career-best seventh at the 2004 World Championships.

At the 1999 Four Continents, Zhang became the first skater to land a clean quadruple toe loop in the short program at an ISU Championship. He has also landed quadruple salchows in competition. He is the second person to land three quadruple jumps in one program. At the 2006 World Championships, the day before his 30th birthday, he landed a 4T-3T combination and 4S in his free skate. He named Elvis Stojko as his idol in the sport.

== Programs ==
Season	Short program	Free skating
2005–06	Swing medley	Alexander by Vangelis
2004–05	Rhapsody on a Theme of Paganini by Sergei Rachmaninoff	Danse macabre by Camille Saint-Saëns; Concert Fantasy on Gounod's Faust by Pablo de Sarasate
2003–04	Lawrence of Arabia by Maurice Jarre	Danse macabre by Camille Saint-Saëns; Concert Fantasy on Gounod's Faust by Pablo de Sarasate
2001–03	Oceanic by Vangelis; Braveheart by James Horner	Overture by Michael Kamen performed by the Seattle Symphony Orchestra; Don Juan DeMarco; Robin Hood: Prince of Thieves by Michael Kamen
2000–01	In the North West Plain; Spring in Sinkiang by Ma Yao Xian both by Czech-Slovak Radio Symphony Orchestra	Jazz Suite No. 1 – Foxtrot; Jazz Suite No. 2 – Lyric Waltz; Taihiti-Trot; The Street by Dmitri Shostakovich Russian Symphony Orchestra

== Results ==
GP: Champions Series/Grand Prix

International
Event	93–94	94–95	95–96	96–97	97–98	98–99	99–00	00–01	01–02	02–03	03–04	04–05	05–06
Olympics	20th								16th				10th
Worlds	33rd							15th	9th	11th	7th	16th	15th
Four Continents						4th	3rd	5th		2nd		9th	
GP Final										6th			
GP Cup of China											9th	4th	5th
GP Cup of Russia												3rd	
GP Lalique									5th	2nd			
GP NHK Trophy			7th						6th				
GP Skate America										4th	3rd		
GP Skate Canada													8th
Asian Games			2nd							3rd			
Asian Champ.		1st			4th								
Finlandia Trophy								4th					
Universiade		3rd				12th							
National
Chinese Champ.	1st	2nd		3rd	3rd	2nd	3rd	2nd	2nd	1st	2nd	1st	
WD: Withdrew
