= Liu Yan (figure skater) =

Chinese figure skater

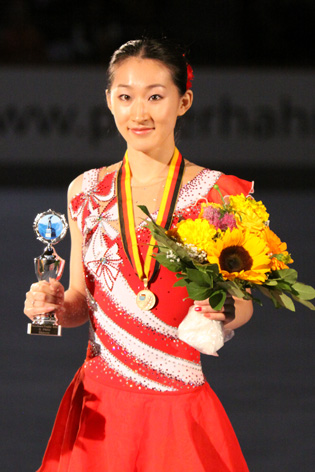
- Liu in 2009

Personal information
- Born: August 30, 1984 (age 41) Qiqihar, Heilongjiang, China
- Home town: Qiqihar, Heilongjiang, China
- Height: 164 cm (5.38 ft)

Figure skating career
- Country: China
- Coach: Yu Lijie, Sun Yu
- Skating club: Qiqihar Club
- Retired: 2010

Liu Yan (simplified Chinese: 刘艳; traditional Chinese: 劉艷; pinyin: Liú Yàn; born August 30, 1984, in Qiqihar, Heilongjiang) is a Chinese former competitive figure skater. She is the 2005 Karl Schäfer Memorial champion, the 2005 Winter Universiade bronze medalist, the 2009 Nebelhorn Trophy bronze medalist, and a five-time (2005, 2007–2010) Chinese national champion. She placed 11th at the 2006 Winter Olympics and 19th at the 2010 Winter Olympics.

== Programs ==
Season	Short program	Free skating	Exhibition
2010–2011	Dream No Regrets	Why Are the Flowers So Red?	
2009–2010	The Impossible Dream by Mitch Leigh	Why Are the Flowers So Red?	
2008–2009	The Impossible Dream by Mitch Leigh	My Parents (The Road Home) by San Bao	
2007–2008	When Darkness Falls by Secret Garden	The Soong Sisters by Kitarō	
2006–2007	Enchantment: Mohini (Enchantment) by Yo-Yo Ma & Silk Road Ensemble	The Soong Sisters by Kitarō	
2005–2006	Valley of the Red River by Mandai King	My Parents (The Road Home) by San Bao	

== Competitive highlights ==
International
Event	02–03	03–04	04–05	05–06	06–07	07–08	08–09	09–10
Olympics				11th				19th
Worlds			21st	16th	22nd	31st	42nd	16th
Four Continents	14th	9th	8th	7th	9th	14th	11th	12th
GP Cup of China		10th	10th	5th	9th		9th	9th
GP Cup of Russia		12th	8th		10th	9th		
GP NHK Trophy						10th		7th
GP Skate America							9th	
GP Skate Canada				4th				
Schäfer Memorial				1st				
Nebelhorn Trophy								3rd
Asian Games					7th			
Universiade			3rd		5th		14th	
National
Chinese Champ.	5th	3rd	1st		1st	1st	1st	1st
Team events
World Team; Trophy							6th T 8th P	
T = Team result; P = Personal result; Medals awarded for team result only.
