= Wang Chen (figure skater) =

Chinese ice dancer

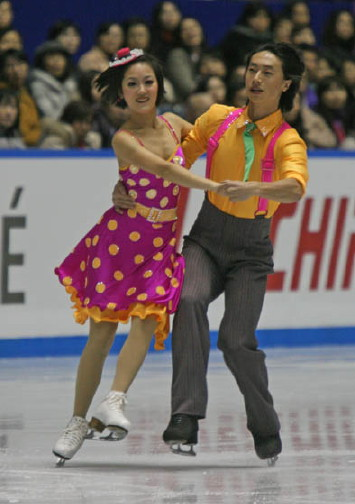
- Yu & Wang at the 2008 NHK Trophy

Personal information
- Born: June 19, 1986 (age 40)
- Height: 180 cm (5 ft 11 in)

Figure skating career
- Country: China
- Partner: Yu Xiaoyang
- Coach: Xi Hongyan
- Skating club: Harbin Skating Club
- Retired: January 28, 2016
Medal record
Figure skating
Ice dancing
Representing China
Asian Winter Games
Bronze medal – third place	2011 Astana-Almaty	Ice dancing
Bronze medal – third place	2007 Changchun	Ice dancing

Wang Chen (Chinese: 王晨; pinyin: Wáng Chén; born June 19, 1986, in Harbin, Heilongjiang) is a Chinese former competitive ice dancer. He competed with Yu Xiaoyang. They are four-time Chinese national champions (2006, 2008, 2010, and 2013), as well as two-time bronze medalists at the Asian Winter Games. Their best score at the Four Continents Figure Skating Competition is 7th place, and at the World Championships is 18th.

== Programs ==
Season	Short Dance/Original Dance	Free Dance	Exhibition
2013-2014	Foxtrot; This Business of Love by Domino; Quickstep; Dancing Fool by Barry Manilow	Concierto de Aranjuez by Joaquín Rodrigo; Prayer for Taylor by Michael W. Smith	
2012-2013	Polka; Oh! Susanna; Waltz; Twilight Waltz by Johnny Gimble	The House of Dancing Water by Benoît Jutras	Just One Last Dance by Sarah Connor
2011-2012	Cha-cha-cha; Mambo; Rhumba; Let's Get Loud by Jennifer Lopez	Howl's Moving Castle (soundtrack) by Joe Hisaishi	
2010–2011	The Blue Danube by Johann Baptist Strauss; Tango	Beethoven's last night by Trans-Siberian Orchestra	
2009–2010	House of Flying Daggers(soundtrack); Chinese Folk Dance	Cats by Trevor Nunn Romeo and Juliet soundtrack	
2008–2009	Swing by Big Bad Voodoo Daddy; Foxtrot	Romeo and Juliet soundtrack	
2007–2008	Hava Nagila; Jewish Folk Dance	Remember soundtrack from Troy	
2006–2007	Queremos Paz & Una Musica Brutal by Gotan Project	Remember soundtrack from Troy	

== Results ==
(with Yu)

Results
International
Event	2001–02	2002–03	2003–04	2004–05	2005–06	2006–07	2007–08	2008–09	2009–10	2010–11	2011–12	2012–13	2013–14
Worlds					22nd		22nd		18th				
Four Continents		11th	10th	11th	7th	9th	8th	8th	8th	7th	7th		
GP Bompard				9th	9th		9th						
GP Cup of China			11th	10th	10th	11th		8th	9th	8th	6th	8th	
GP NHK Trophy								9th		9th		8th	
GP Skate America			10th				10th		10th				
GP Skate Canada						11th							
Asian Games						3rd				3rd			
Universiade				9th		6th		11th					
International: Junior
Junior Worlds		18th											
National
Chinese Champ.	3rd	4th	2nd	3rd	1st	2nd	1st	3rd	1st	2nd	2nd	1st	2nd
Team events
World Team												5T / 6P	
GP = Grand Prix; T = Team result; P = Personal result; Medals awarded for team result only.
