= Han Bing =

Chinese ice dancer

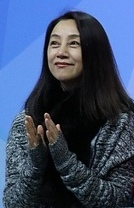

Personal information
- Nationality: Chinese
- Born: 21 December 1969 (age 55)

Sport
- Sport: Figure skating

Han Bing (simplified Chinese: 韩冰; traditional Chinese: 韓冰; pinyin: Hán Bīng; born 21 December 1969) is a Chinese ice dancer. She competed in the ice dance event at the 1992 Winter Olympics.
