= Zhao Ziquan =

Chinese figure skater

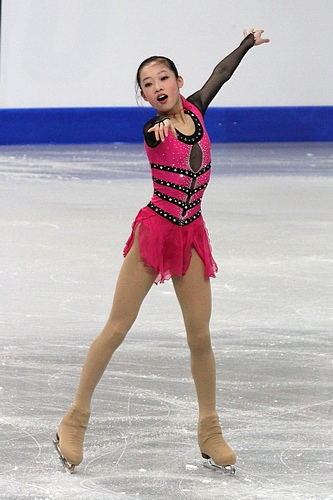
- Zhao at the 2012 Junior Worlds

Personal information
- Born: December 27, 1997 (age 28) Harbin, China
- Height: 1.70 m (5 ft 7 in)

Figure skating career
- Country: China
- Coach: Jia Shuguang, Liu Wei
- Skating club: Harbin Winter Sports Training Centre
- Began skating: 2001

Zhao Ziquan (simplified Chinese: 赵子荃; traditional Chinese: 趙子荃; pinyin: Zhào Zǐquán; December 27, 1997) is a Chinese figure skater. She is a two-time Chinese national champion (2016, 2017) and has competed in the free skate at six ISU Championships, including the 2016 World Championships in Boston.

== Programs ==
Season	Short program	Free skating	Exhibition
2017–18	Prelude Op.28, No.15 in D-Flat Major (Raindrop) by Frédéric Chopin choreo. by David Wilson	Taquito Militar; Oblivion by Astor Piazzolla choreo. by David Wilson	
2016–17	Over the Rainbow choreo. by David Wilson	Song of India (from Sadko) by Nikolai Rimsky-Korsakov choreo. by David Wilson	
2015–16	Caravan by Juan Tizol	The Impossible Dream (from Man of La Mancha) by Mitch Leigh	Life is in an Instant by Jane Zhang
2014–15	Bahrein by Princesses of Violin	Adagio in G minor by Remo Giazotto, Tomaso Albinoni	The Show by Lenka
2013–14	Liebesträume by Franz Liszt	Carmen by Georges Bizet	
2012–13	Moonlight Sonata by Henry Mancini	Black Swan by Clint Mansell	
2011–12	Encore by David Garrett	Can't Buy My Love by John Lennon	You Raise Me Up

== Competitive highlights ==
GP: Grand Prix; CS: Challenger Series; JGP: Junior Grand Prix

International
Event	09–10	10–11	11–12	12–13	13–14	14–15	15–16	16–17	17–18	18–19
Worlds							23rd			
Four Continents					15th		16th	15th	17th	
GP Cup of China							11th	11th	11th	
CS Finlandia									16th	
CS Tallinn Trophy									11th	
Asian Games								7th		
Volvo Open Cup				2nd						
Universiade						11th		8th		WD
International: Junior
Junior Worlds			11th	15th	25th					
JGP Austria				4th						
JGP Estonia					11th					
JGP France				10th						
JGP Italy			6th							
JGP Slovakia					12th					
National
Chinese Champ.	18th	5th	4th	2nd	2nd	2nd	1st	1st	2nd	
Chinese NG			4th				2nd			
WD = Withdrew

== Detailed results ==
2016-17 season
Date	Event	Level	QR	SP	FS	Total
November 18–20, 2016	2016 Cup of China	Senior	–	10; 58.20	12; 90.92	11; 149.12
2012–13 season
Date	Event	Level	QR	SP	FS	Total
January 10–13, 2012	2013 Volvo Open Cup	Senior	–	2; 47.59	2; 92.03	2; 139.62
December 20–21, 2012	2013 Chinese Championship	Senior	–	2; 49.16	5; 80.84	2; 130.00
September 12–15, 2012	2012 Junior Grand Prix, Austria	Junior	–	5; 53.87	4; 92.35	4; 146.22
August 22–25, 2012	2012 Junior Grand Prix, France	Junior	–	8; 44.80	13; 69.07	10; 113.87
2011–12 season
Date	Event	Level	QR	SP	FS	Total
Feb. 27 – March 4, 2012	2012 World Junior Championships	Junior	2; 94.53	10; 49.22	11; 94.70	11; 143.19
January 4–6, 2012	12th Chinese National Winter Games	Senior	–	4; 48.52	3; 98.28	4; 146.80
October 6–8, 2011	2011 Junior Grand Prix, Italy	Junior	–	5; 45.80	6; 87.53	6; 133.33
September 20–23, 2011	2012 Chinese Championships	Senior	10; 44.62	4; 47.01	2; 94.19	4; 185.82

- QR = Qualifying round
