= Fang Dan =

Chinese figure skater

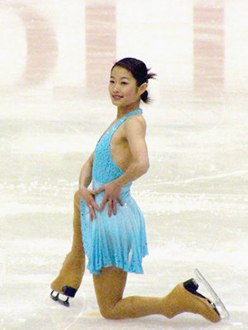
- Fang in 2003.

Personal information
- Born: March 20, 1985 (age 41)
- Height: 154 cm (5 ft 1 in)

Figure skating career
- Country: China
- Skating club: Qiqihar Skating Club

Fang Dan (Chinese: 方丹, born March 20, 1985, in Qiqihar, China) is a Chinese figure skater. She is a three-time Chinese national champion, three time silver medalist, and two time bronze medalist.

== Competitive highlights ==
Event	1999-00	2000-01	2001-02	2002-03	2003-04	2004-05	2005-06	2006-07	2007-08
World Championships			20th	18th	19th				
Four Continents Championships		16th	7th	6th	12th	12th	15th	10th	
World Junior Championships	13th	13th							
Chinese Championships	1st	3rd	1st	1st	2nd	2nd	2nd	3rd	
Cup of China					8th	9th	7th	11th	7th
Trophée Eric Bompard				7th	9th	11th			10th
NHK Trophy				10th	9th			6th	
Skate America							9th		
Winter Universiade						9th		3rd	
Asian Winter Games				5th				4th	
Junior Grand Prix, Japan			3rd						
Junior Grand Prix, China		7th							
Junior Grand Prix, Norway		12th							
Junior Grand Prix, Canada	5th								
