= Ding Yang =

Chinese pair skater

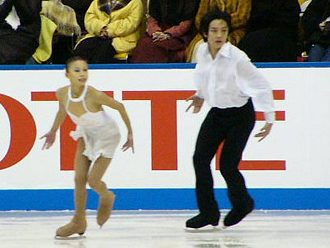
- Ding & Ren in 2003.

Personal information
- Born: May 10, 1984 (age 42) Harbin, Heilongjiang
- Height: 158 cm (5 ft 2 in)

Figure skating career
- Country: China
- Skating club: Harbin Skating Club
- Retired: 2005

Ding Yang (simplified Chinese: 丁扬; traditional Chinese: 丁揚; pinyin: Dīng Yáng; born May 10, 1984, in Harbin, Heilongjiang, China) is a Chinese former pair skater. She competed with Ren Zhongfei.

They are the 2005 Chinese national champions. They are the 2002 World Junior bronze medalists and the 2003 World Junior silver medalists. Although they attempted the throw quadruple toe loop in international competition, they never successfully landed it cleanly and it was never ratified.

== Results ==
(with Ren)

Event	1999-2000	2000-2001	2001-2002	2002-2003	2003-2004	2004-2005
Four Continents Championships			8th		6th	
World Junior Championship	11th	6th	3rd	2nd		
Chinese Championships	2nd J.	4th	4th	2nd	3rd	1st
Skate America						4th
Skate Canada International					8th	
Cup of China					8th	4th
NHK Trophy					7th	
Winter Universiade						4th
ISU Junior Grand Prix Final		5th	3rd	1st		
ISU Junior Grand Prix, Montreal				1st		
ISU Junior Grand Prix, Scottsdale				1st		
ISU Junior Grand Prix, Malmö			2nd			
ISU Junior Grand Prix, Milan			3rd			
ISU Junior Grand Prix, Harbin		2nd				
ISU Junior Grand Prix, Gdansk		2nd				
