= Yang Fang (figure skater) =

Chinese ice dancer

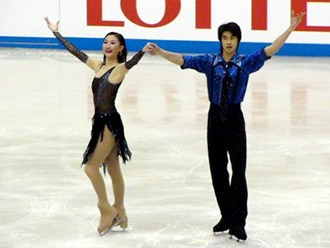
- Yang & Gao in 2003.

Personal information
- Born: July 3, 1984 (age 42)
- Height: 170 cm (5 ft 7 in)

Figure skating career
- Country: China
- Partner: Gao Chongbo
- Coach: Natalia Dubova
- Skating club: Qiqihar Skating Club

Yang Fang (simplified Chinese: 杨芳; traditional Chinese: 楊芳; pinyin: Yáng Fāng; born July 3, 1984, in Qiqihar, Heilongjiang) is a Chinese ice dancer. She competed with Gao Chongbo as her partner. They were the 2001 and 2003 to 2005 Chinese national champions. Their highest placement at an ISU championship was 6th at the 2004 Four Continents Championships.

== Results ==
(with Gao)

Event	1999-00	2000-01	2001-02	2002-03	2003-04	2004-05	2005-06
World Championship					22nd	23rd	
Four Continents Championships				10th	6th	10th	
Asian Winter Games				4th			
World Junior Championship	21st	17th					
Chinese Championships	3rd	1st		1st	1st	1st	
Cup of China					9th	9th	
NHK Trophy					11th	10th	
Golden Spin of Zagreb				4th			
Karl Schäfer Memorial							11th
