= Ren Zhongfei =

Chinese former pair skater (born 1982)

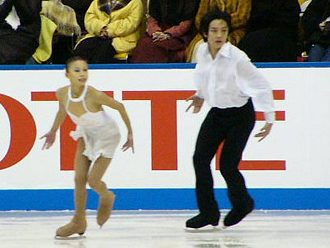
- Ding & Ren in 2003.

Personal information
- Born: August 28, 1982 (age 43) Harbin, Heilongjiang
- Height: 158 cm (5 ft 2 in)

Figure skating career
- Country: China
- Skating club: Harbin Skating Club
- Retired: 2005

Ren Zhongfei (simplified Chinese: 任重飞; traditional Chinese: 任重飛; pinyin: Rèn Zhòngfēi; born August 28, 1982, in Harbin, Heilongjiang, China) is a Chinese former pair skater. He competed with Ding Yang. They are the 2005 Chinese national champions. They are the 2002 World Junior bronze medalists and the 2003 World Junior silver medalists. Although they attempted the throw quadruple toe loop in international competition, they never successfully landed it cleanly and it was never ratified.

== Results ==
(with Ding)

Event	1999-2000	2000-2001	2001-2002	2002-2003	2003-2004	2004-2005
Four Continents Championships			8th		6th	
World Junior Championship	11th	6th	3rd	2nd		
Chinese Championships	2nd J.	4th	4th	2nd	3rd	1st
Skate America						4th
Skate Canada International					8th	
Cup of China					8th	4th
NHK Trophy					7th	
Winter Universiade						4th
ISU Junior Grand Prix Final		5th	3rd	1st		
ISU Junior Grand Prix, Montreal				1st		
ISU Junior Grand Prix, Scottsdale				1st		
ISU Junior Grand Prix, Malmö			2nd			
ISU Junior Grand Prix, Milan			3rd			
ISU Junior Grand Prix, Harbin		2nd				
ISU Junior Grand Prix, Gdansk		2nd				
