= Gao Chongbo =

Chinese ice dancer

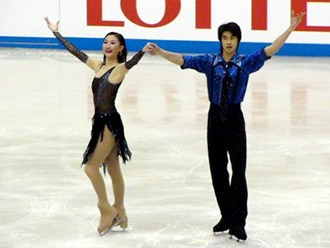
- Yang Fang & Gao Chongbo in 2003.

Personal information
- Born: December 14, 1980 (age 45)
- Height: 180 cm (5 ft 11 in)

Figure skating career
- Country: China
- Partner: Wang Jiayue
- Coach: Bing Han
- Skating club: Nanjing Club

Gao Chongbo (Chinese: 高崇博; pinyin: Gāo Chóngbó; born December 14, 1980, in Qiqihar, Heilongjiang) is a Chinese ice dancer.

He teamed up with Wang Jiayue in 2008. They placed 9th at the 2009 Four Continents Championships

He previously skated with Yang Fang. They were the 2001 & 2003-2005 Chinese national champions. Their highest placement at an ISU championship was 6th at the 2004 Four Continents Championships.

== Competitive highlights ==
(with Gao)

Competition	2008-2009
Four Continents Championships	9th

(with Yang)

Event	1999-00	2000-01	2001-02	2002-03	2003-04	2004-05	2005-06
World Championship					22nd	23rd	
Four Continents Championships				10th	6th	10th	
Asian Winter Games				4th			
World Junior Championship	21st	17th					
Chinese Championships	3rd	1st		1st	1st	1st	
Cup of China					9th	9th	
NHK Trophy					11th	10th	
Golden Spin of Zagreb				4th			
Karl Schäfer Memorial							11th
