= 2023–24 national figure skating championships =

- Type: National championship
- Season: 2023–24
- Host: ISU member nations
- Previous: 2022–23
- Next: 2024–25

National figure skating championships for the 2023–24 season took place mainly from December 2023 to January 2024. They were held to crown national champions and to serve as part of the selection process for international events, such as the 2024 ISU Championships and Youth Olympics. Medals were awarded in the disciplines of men's singles, women's singles, pairs, and ice dance. A few countries chose to organize their national championships together with their neighbors; the results were subsequently divided into national podiums.

== National competitions ==
Code key

- S – Senior event
- J – Junior event
- N – Novice event
- M – Men's singles
- W – Women's singles
- P – Pair skating
- D – Ice dance

Color key

- National championships
- Other domestic competition

2023–24
Dates	Event	Type	Level	Disc.	Location	Results
July 20–23	Brazilian Championships	Nationals	All	M/W	São Paulo, Brazil	
August 25–26	Argentine Championships	Nationals	All	W	Ushuaia, Argentina	
September 28–30	Master's de Patinage	Other	S/J	All	Villard-de-Lans, France	
October 7–10	New Zealand Championships	Nationals	All	M/W/D	Dunedin, New Zealand	
October 20–21	Vietnamese Championships	Nationals	All	M/W	Hanoi, Vietnam	
November 10–11	Philippine Championships	Nationals	All	M/W/P	Manila, Philippines	
November 11–12	Chinese Taipei Championships	Nationals	All	M/W	Taipei, Taiwan	
November 17–18	Belgian Championships	Nationals	All	M/W	Mechelen, Belgium	
November 17–19	Japan Junior Championships	Nationals	Junior	All	Ōtsu, Japan	
November 23–26	Icelandic Championships	Nationals	All	W	Akureyri, Iceland	
November 24–26	Chinese Junior Championships	Nationals	Junior	M/W/D	Harbin, China	
November 25–26	Serbian Championships	Nationals	All	W	Belgrade, Serbia	
November 27 – December 3	Mexican Championships	Nationals	All	M/W	Puebla, Mexico	
November 29 – December 3	Skate Canada Challenge	Other	S/J	All	Winnipeg, Manitoba, Canada	
November 30 – December 3	British Championships	Nationals	All	All	Sheffield, England, United Kingdom	
December 1–8	Australian Championships	Nationals	All	All	Erina, New South Wales, Australia	
December 6–10	Romanian Championships	Nationals	S/J	M/W	Otopeni, Romania	
December 8–9	Kuwait Championships	Nationals	All	W	Kuwait City, Kuwait	
December 8–10	Latvian Championships	Nationals	S/J	M/W	Riga, Latvia	
December 8–10	German Junior Championships	Nationals	J/N	M/W	Dortmund, Germany	
December 9–10	Danish Championships	Nationals	All	M/W/D	Herlev, Denmark	
December 9–14	French Championships	Nationals	Senior	All	Vaujany, France	
December 13–14	Armenian Championships	Nationals	All	M/W/D	Yerevan, Armenia	
December 13–15	Kazakh Championships	Nationals	All	M/W	Almaty, Kazakhstan	
December 13–17	Austrian Championships	Nationals	All	All	Feldkirch, Austria	
December 14–16	Four Nationals Championships	Nationals	S/J	All	Turnov, Czech Republic	
December 14–16	Swedish Championships	Nationals	All	All	Norrköping, Sweden	
December 14–16	German Championships	Nationals	All	All	Berlin, Germany	
December 14–17	Bulgarian Championships	Nationals	All	M/W	Sofia, Bulgaria	
December 15–17	Spanish Championships	Nationals	All	All	Logroño, Spain	
December 15–17	Swiss Championships	Nationals	S/J	M/W/D	Küsnacht, Switzerland	
December 15–17	Finnish Championships	Nationals	S/J	All	Helsinki, Finland	
December 15–17	Turkish Championships	Nationals	All	M/W	Kocaeli, Turkey	
December 16	Peruvian Championships	Nationals	Senior	W	Lima, Peru	
December 16–17	Lithuanian Championships	Nationals	All	M/W	Kaunas, Lithuania	
December 16–17	Croatian Championships	Nationals	All	M/W	Zagreb, Croatia	
December 16–17	Estonian Championships	Nationals	Senior	M/W	Tondiraba, Estonia	
December 16–17	Belarusian Championships	Nationals	Senior	M/W/D	Minsk, Belarus	
December 16–17	Slovenian Championships	Nationals	S/J	M/W	Jesenice, Slovenia	
December 20–24	Japan Championships	Nationals	Senior	All	Nagano, Japan	
December 20–25	Russian Championships	Nationals	Senior	All	Chelyabinsk, Russia	
December 21–24	Chinese Championships	Nationals	Senior	All	Hebei, China	
December 22–23	Georgian Championships	Nationals	All	All	Tbilisi, Georgia	
December 22–23	Italian Championships	Nationals	S/J	All	Pinerolo, Italy	
January 4–7	South Korean Championships	Nationals	S/J	M/W/D	Uijeongbu, South Korea	
January 8–14	Canadian Championships	Nationals	S/J	All	Calgary, Alberta, Canada	
January 12–14	Belarusian Junior Championships	Nationals	Junior	All	Minsk, Belarus	
January 12–14	French Junior Championships	Nationals	Junior	All	Nice, France	
January 19–21	Polish Junior Championships	Nationals	Junior	All	Krynica-Zdrój, Poland	
January 22–28	U.S. Championships	Nationals	S/J	All	Columbus, Ohio, United States	
January 26–28	Norwegian Championships	Nationals	All	M/W	Tromsø, Norway	
January 27–28	Hungarian Junior Championships	Nationals	J/N	M/W/D	Budapest, Hungary	
February 2–3	Czech Junior Championships	Nationals	J	M/W	Mariánské Lázně, Czech Republic	
February 3–4	Estonian Junior Championships	Nationals	J/N	M/W/D	Tartu, Estonia	
February 5–9	Russian Junior Championships	Nationals	Junior	All	Saransk, Russia	
February 15–18	United Arab Emirates Championships	Nationals	Junior	W	Abu Dhabi, United Arab Emirates	
February 17–27	Chinese Winter Games	Other	S/J	All	Hulunbuir, China	
February 22–25	Dutch Championships	Nationals	All	W/P/D	Tilburg, Netherlands	
March 2–3	North Macedonian Championships	Nationals	All	W	Skopje, North Macedonia	
March 9–10	Slovak Junior Championships	Nationals	J/N	All	Nové Mesto nad Váhom, Slovakia	
March 10–13	South African Championships	Nationals	All	All	Cape Town, South Africa	
March 15–17	Luxembourg Championships	Nationals	J/N	W	Kockelscheuer, Luxembourg	
March 15–18	Ukrainian Junior Championships	Nationals	Junior	All	Odesa, Ukraine	
April 1–4	Ukrainian Championships	Nationals	Senior	M/W/P	Bohuslav, Ukraine	
April 3–4	Israeli Championships	Nationals	All	All	Holon, Israel	
April 4–6	Thai Championships	Nationals	All	M/W	Bangkok, Thailand	
April 6-7	Portuguese Championships	Nationals	All	M/W	Covilhã, Portugal	
May 4–5	Andorran Championships	Nationals	J/N	M/W	Canillo, Andorra	
May 27–28	Hong Kong Championships	Nationals	All	All	Kowloon Tong, Hong Kong	
June 5–7	Malaysian Championships	Nationals	All		Kuala Lumpur, Malaysia	
June 8–9	Irish Championships	Nationals	All	M/W/D	Dundee, Scotland	
June 15	Egyptian Championships	Nationals	J/N	W	Cairo, Egypt	

== Senior medalists ==
=== Men's singles ===
Championships	Gold	Silver	Bronze	Ref.
Armenia	Fedor Chitipakhovian	No other competitors		
Australia	Darian Kaptich	Douglas Gerber	No other competitors	
Austria	Maurizio Zandron	Luc Maierhofer	Anton Skoficz	
Belarus	Evgenij Puzanov	Alexander Lebedev	Vasilij Borohovskij	
Belgium	Christopher Lison	No other competitors		
Brazil	Arthur Alcorte	Guilherme Ferrazzi	No other competitors	
Bulgaria	Alexander Zlatkov	Beat Shyumperli	Filip Kaymakchiev	
Canada	Wesley Chiu	Aleksa Rakic	Anthony Paradis	
China	Chen Yudong	Dai Daiwei	Han Wenbao	
Chinese Taipei	Yeh Che-Yu	Lin Fang-Yi	Huang Yu-Chun	
Croatia	Jari Kessler	No other competitors		
Czech Republic	Georgii Reshtenko	Filip Ščerba	No other competitors	
Estonia	Mihhail Selevko	Aleksandr Selevko	Arlet Levandi	
Finland	Makar Suntsev	Valtter Virtanen	Arttu Juusola	
France	Adam Siao Him Fa	Luc Economides	François Pitot	
(Georgia (country)) Georgia	Nika Egadze	No other competitors		
Germany	Kai Jagoda	Nikita Starostin	Denis Gurdzhi	
(United Kingdom) Great Britain	Edward Appleby	Freddie Leggott	Ken Fitterer	
Hong Kong	Jarvis Ho	Lap Kan Lincoln Yuen	Heung Lai Jarke Zhao	
Hungary	Aleksandr Vlasenko	Aleksei Vlasenko	No other competitors	
Israel	Mark Gorodnitsky	No other competitors		
Italy	Nikolaj Memola	Gabriele Frangipani	Corey Circelli	
Japan	Shoma Uno	Yuma Kagiyama	Sōta Yamamoto	
Latvia	Deniss Vasiļjevs	Fedir Kulish	No other competitors	
Lithuania	Daniel Korabelnik	Daniels Kockers	No other competitors	
Mexico	Donovan Carrillo	No other competitors		
Norway	Jan William Eraker	No other competitors		
Philippines	Paolo Borromeo	Henry Privett-Mendoza	No other competitors	
Poland	Vladimir Samoilov	Matvii Yefymenko	Jakub Lofek	
Portugal	David Gouveia	No other competitors		
Russia	Evgeni Semenenko	Vladislav Dikidzhi	Petr Gumennik	
Slovakia	Adam Hagara	Lukáš Václavík	No other competitors	
Slovenia	David Sedej	No other competitors		
South Korea	Cha Jun-hwan	Lee Si-hyeong	Seo Min-kyu	
Spain	Tomàs-Llorenç Guarino Sabaté	Iker Oyarzábal	Euken Alberdi	
Sweden	Gabriel Folkesson	Casper Johansson	Jonathan Egyptson	
Switzerland	Lukas Britschgi	Georgii Pavlov	Nico Steffen	
Turkey	Burak Demirboğa	Alp Eren Özkan	Alp Töre Ovalıoğlu	
Ukraine	Kyrylo Marsak	Ivan Shmuratko	Vadym Novikov	
United States	Ilia Malinin	Jason Brown	Camden Pulkinen	

=== Women's singles ===
Championships	Gold	Silver	Bronze	Ref.
Argentina	Sophia Dayan	Cecilia Belén Schinocca	No other competitors	
Armenia	Ellen Ghazaryan	No other competitors		
Australia	Hana Bath	Vlada Vasiliev	Maria Chernyshova	
Austria	Olga Mikutina	Stefanie Pesendorfer	Emily Saari	
Belarus	Viktoriia Safonova	Valeriya Ezhova	Elizaveta Pikulik	
Belgium	Nina Pinzarrone	Jade Hovine	No other competitors	
Bulgaria	Alexandra Feigin	Kristina Grigorova	Daniela Nikolova	
Canada	Kaiya Ruiter	Madeline Schizas	Hetty Shi	
China	Wang Yihan	Jin Shuxian	Gao Shiqi	
Chinese Taipei	Ting Tzu-Han	Amanda Hsu	No other competitors	
Croatia	Hana Cvijanović	Lorena Čižmek	Luce Stipaničev	
Czech Republic	Barbora Vránková	Eliška Březinová	Michaela Vrašťáková	
Denmark	Annika Skibby	Nicole Romanova Jensen	Mia Juel Jensen	
Estonia	Elina Goidina	Nataly Langerbaur	Kristina Lisovskaja	
Finland	Nella Pelkonen	Olivia Lisko	Oona Ounasvuori	
France	Lorine Schild	Stefania Gladki	Léa Serna	
Germany	Kristina Isaev	Sarah Pesch	Hanna Keiß	
(United Kingdom) Great Britain	Nina Povey	Kristen Spours	Arabella Sear-Watkins	
Hong Kong	Tsz Ching Chan	Joanna So	Hiu Yau Chow	
Hungary	Regina Schermann	Dária Zsirnov	Anna Katinka Zsembery	
Iceland	Júlía Sylvía Gunnarsdóttir	No other competitors		
Israel	Maria Seniuk	Elizabet Gervits	Julia Fennel	
Italy	Sarina Joos	Lara Naki Gutmann	Anna Pezzetta	
Japan	Kaori Sakamoto	Mone Chiba	Mao Shimada	
Kuwait	Hessa Al-Saraawi	No other competitors		
Latvia	Sofja Stepčenko	Angelīna Kučvaļska	Anastasija Konga	
Lithuania	Meda Variakojyte	Aleksandra Golovkina	Jogailė Aglinskytė	
Mexico	Andrea Montesinos Cantú	Eugenia Garza	Andrea Astrain Maynez	
New Zealand	Danielle Gebser	Ella Smith	No other competitors	
North Macedonia	Jana Kokovska	Angela Prilepcanska	No other competitors	
Norway	Mia Caroline Risa Gomez	Kaia Kleven	Linnea Kolstad Kilsand	
Peru	Bow Bagley	No other competitors		
Philippines	Sofia Frank	Skye Chua	Skye Frances Patenia	
Poland	Ekaterina Kurakova	Laura Szczęsna	Karolina Białas	
Romania	Julia Sauter	Ana-Sofia Beşchea	Andreea Ramona Voicu	
Russia	Adeliia Petrosian	Sofia Muravieva	Kamila Valieva	
Serbia	Marija Krizova	No other competitors		
Slovakia	Vanesa Šelmeková	Ema Doboszová	Simona Koleňáková	
Slovenia	Julija Lovrenčič	Lana Omovšek	Ana Kralj	
South Africa	Gian-Quen Isaacs	No other competitors		
South Korea	Shin Ji-a	Lee Hae-in	Kim Chae-yeon	
Spain	Emilia Murdock	Celia Vandhana Garnacho	Marian Eugenia Millares Torres	
Sweden	Josefin Taljegård	Julia Brovall	Nina Fredriksson	
Switzerland	Kimmy Repond	Anthea Gradinaru	Livia Kaiser	
Thailand	Teekhree Silpa-Archa	No other competitors		
Turkey	Ceren Karaş	Ceyda Sağlam	Salma Agamova	
Ukraine	Anastasiia Gozhva	Tetiana Firsova Kyi	Elyzaveta Babenko	
United States	Amber Glenn	Josephine Lee	Isabeau Levito	
Vietnam	Ngô Hoàng Ngân	No other competitors		

=== Pairs ===
Championships	Gold	Silver	Bronze	Ref.
Australia	Anastasia Golubeva / Hektor Giotopoulos Moore	No other competitors		
Austria	Sophia Schaller / Livio Mayr	No other competitors		
Canada	Deanna Stellato-Dudek / Maxime Deschamps	Lia Pereira / Trennt Michaud	Kelly Ann Laurin / Loucas Éthier	
China	Peng Cheng / Wang Lei	Zhang Jiaxuan / Huang Yihang	Zhang Siyang / Yang Yongchao	
Czech Republic	Barbora Kucianová / Martin Bidař	No other competitors		
Finland	Milania Väänänen / Filippo Clerici	No other competitors		
France	Camille Kovalev / Pavel Kovalev	Océane Piegad / Denys Strekalin	Aurélie Faula / Théo Belle	
Germany	Minerva Fabienne Hase / Nikita Volodin	Janne Salatzki / Lukas Röseler	No other competitors	
(United Kingdom) Great Britain	Anastasia Vaipan-Law / Luke Digby	Lydia Smart / Harry Mattick	No other competitors	
Hong Kong	Kristal Chow / Yiu Hong Wong	No other competitors		
Hungary	Maria Pavlova / Alexei Sviatchenko	No other competitors		
Italy	Rebecca Ghilardi / Filippo Ambrosini	Lucrezia Beccari / Matteo Guarise	Anna Valesi / Manuel Piazza	
Japan	Yuna Nagaoka / Sumitada Moriguchi	No other competitors		
Philippines	Isabella Gamez / Alexander Korovin	No other competitors		
Poland	Ioulia Chtchetinina / Michał Woźniak	No other competitors		
Russia	Anastasia Mishina / Aleksandr Galliamov	Aleksandra Boikova / Dmitrii Kozlovskii	Ekaterina Chikmareva / Matvei Ianchenkov	
Sweden	Greta Crafoord / John Crafoord	No other competitors		
Switzerland	Pauline Irman / Benjamin Jalovick	No other competitors		
Ukraine	Sofiia Holichenko / Artem Darenskyi	Veronika Nagorna / Vadym Galiareta	No other competitors	
United States	Ellie Kam / Danny O'Shea	Alisa Efimova / Misha Mitrofanov	Valentina Plazas / Maximiliano Fernandez	

=== Ice dance ===
Championships	Gold	Silver	Bronze	Ref.
Australia	Romy Malcolm / Kobi Chant	No other competitors		
Austria	Corinna Huber / Patrik Huber	No other competitors		
Belarus	Ekaterina Andreeva / Dmitrii Blinov	Natalya Pozhivilko / Svyatoslav Verstakov	Elizaveta Novik / Alexander Kuharevskij	
Canada	Piper Gilles / Paul Poirier	Marie-Jade Lauriault / Romain Le Gac	Alicia Fabbri / Paul Ayer	
China	Chen Xizi / Xing Jianing	Shi Shang / Wu Nan	Xiao Zixi / He Linghao	
Czech Republic	Kateřina Mrázková / Daniel Mrázek	No other competitors		
Denmark	Elisabetta Incardona / Rafael Marc Drozd Musil	No other competitors		
Estonia	Solène Mazingue / Marko Jevgeni Gaidajenko	No other competitors		
Finland	Juulia Turkkila / Matthias Versluis	Yuka Orihara / Juho Pirinen	No other competitors	
France	Evgenia Lopareva / Geoffrey Brissaud	Loïcia Demougeot / Théo le Mercier	Marie Dupayage / Thomas Nabais	
Germany	Jennifer Janse van Rensburg / Benjamin Steffan	Charise Matthaei / Max Liebers	Karla Maria Karl / Kai Hoferichter	
(United Kingdom) Great Britain	Lilah Fear / Lewis Gibson	Phebe Bekker / James Hernandez	Layla Karnes / Liam Carr	
Hong Kong	Ran Kang / Han Wan Chau	No other competitors		
Hungary	Mariia Ignateva / Danijil Szemko	Lucy Hancock / Illias Fourati	Emese Csiszer / Mark Shapiro	
(Republic of Ireland) Ireland	Carolane Soucisse / Shane Firus	No other competitors		
Israel	Mariia Nosovitsky / Michael Nosovitsky	Shira Ichilov / Dmitry Kravchenko	No other competitors	
Italy	Charlène Guignard / Marco Fabbri	Victoria Manni / Carlo Röthlisberger	Leia Dozzi / Pietro Papetti	
Japan	Misato Komatsubara / Tim Koleto	Azusa Tanaka / Shingo Nishiyama	Utana Yoshida / Masaya Morita	
Poland	Olivia Oliver / Filip Bojanowski	Sofiia Dovhal / Wiktor Kulesza	Anastasia Polibina / Pavel Golovishnikov	
Russia	Alexandra Stepanova / Ivan Bukin	Elizaveta Khudaiberdieva / Egor Bazin	Irina Khavronina / Devid Naryzhnyy	
Slovakia	Maria Sofia Pucherova / Nikita Lysak	Anna Simova / Kirill Aksenov	No other competitors	
South Korea	Hannah Lim / Ye Quan	No other competitors		
Spain	Olivia Smart / Tim Dieck	Sofía Val / Asaf Kazimov	Philomène Sabourin / Raul Bermejo Gutierrez	
Sweden	Milla Ruud Reitan / Nikolaj Majorov	Emma Kivioja / Erik Pellnor	No other competitors	
Switzerland	Arianna Sassi / Luca Morini	Kayleigh Ella Maksymec / Félix Desmarais	Nicole Calderari / Cristian Murer	
United States	Madison Chock / Evan Bates	Christina Carreira / Anthony Ponomarenko	Emily Bratti / Ian Somerville	

== Junior medalists ==
=== Men's singles ===
Championships	Gold	Silver	Bronze	Ref.
Armenia	Mikhail Salazaryan	Konstantin Smirnov	No other competitors	
Australia	Vinceman Chong	Kryshtof Pradeaux	James Lin	
Austria	Daniel Ruis	No other competitors		
Belarus	Vasilij Borohovskij	Pavel Gavdis	Mihail Labovich	
Belgium	Denis Krouglov	Dimitri Christakis	Gabriel Leander	
Brazil	Lucaz Filipe Candria	No other competitors		
Bulgaria	Dean Mihaylov	Yoanis Apostou	Alexander Kachamakov	
Canada	Terry Yu Tao Jin	David Li	David Shteyngart	
China	Tian Tonghe	Chen Yudong	Han Wenbao	
Chinese Taipei	Li Yu-Hsiang	Wu Bo-Shun	Chen Xin-Wu	
Croatia	Fran Petrović	No other competitors		
Czech Republic	Tadeáš Václavík	Jan Valtera	No other competitors	
Denmark	Wendell Hansson-Östergaard	Dimitri Steffensen	No other competitors	
Estonia	Arlet Levandi	Jegor Martsenko	Vladislav Churakov	
Finland	Matias Heinonen	Anton Erkama	Benjamin Eriksson	
France	François Pitot	Ilia Gogitidze	Axel Ahmed	
Germany	Luca Fünfer	Hugo Willi Herrmann	Leon Rojkov	
(United Kingdom) Great Britain	Jedidiah Lincoln	Tao Macrae	Arin Yorke	
Hong Kong	Jiarui Li	Jarvis Ho	Chit Wang Chow	
Hungary	Aleksei Vlasenko	Bencedek Pál Dózsa	Kolos Rác	
Israel	Tamir Kuperman	Nikita Sheiko	Kirill Sheiko	
Japan	Shunsuke Nakamura	Rio Nakata	Tsudoi Suto	
Latvia	Kirills Korkačs	Nikolajs Krivošeja	Akims Kirilovs	
Lithuania	Luka Imedashvili	No other competitors		
New Zealand	Li Yanhao	Stepan Kadlcik	Blake Barraclough	
Norway	Daniil Valanov	No other competitors		
Poland	Jakub Lofek	Matvii Yefymenko	Oscar Oliver	
Romania	Răzvan Cionac	Anelin George Enache	No other competitors	
Russia	Arseny Fedotov	Lev Lazarev	Ivan Ramzenkov	
Slovakia	Dmitry Rudenko	Jozef Curma	No other competitors	
South Africa	Cody Kock	Nicolas van de Vijber	No other competitors	
South Korea	Yu Dong-han	Chung Jae-wook	Kim Tae-hwan	
Spain	Adrián Jiménez de Baldomero	André Zapata Casares	Mahery Randrianarivony López	
Sweden	Elias Sayed	Hugo Bostedt	Adam Bjelke	
Switzerland	Aurélian Chervet	Ean Weiler	Damien Eckstein	
Thailand	Hiro Kaewtathip	Tharon Warasittichai	Kittikorn Kijsanapitak	
Turkey	Ali Efe Güneş	Efe Ergin Dinçer	Furkan Emre Incel	
Ukraine	Egor Kurtsev	Vadym Novikov	Mark Kulish	
United States	Lucius Kazanecki	Taira Shinohara	Aleksandr Fegan	
Vietnam	Nguyễn Hữu Hoàng	No other competitors		

=== Women's singles ===
Championships	Gold	Silver	Bronze	Ref.
Andorra	Nerea Grandoso Domínguez	No other competitors		
Armenia	Sofi Karapetyan	Rubina Simonyan	Gohar Gevorgyan	
Australia	Hana Bath	Trisha Tong	Sienna Kaczmarczyk	
Austria	Flora Marie Schaller	Hannah Frank	Sara Höfer	
Belarus	Valeriya Ezhova	Elizaveta Kostyuk	Anna Kalinka	
Belgium	Charlotte Jennes	Danielle Verbinnen	Jolien Jennes	
Brazil	Maria Joaquina Reikdal	No other competitors		
Bulgaria	Chiara Hristova	Leilah Patten	Lia Lyubenova	
Canada	Lulu Lin	Aleksa Volkova	Mély-Ann Gagner	
China	Gao Shiqi	Li Ruotang	Wang Yihan	
Chinese Taipei	Tsai Yu-Feng	Sadie Shen Weng	Chloe Tang	
Croatia	Lena Cusak	Megy Filipović	Bruna Barić	
Czech Republic	Jana Horčičková	Barbora Tykalová	Kateřina Hanušová	
Denmark	Camilla Vinther Poulsen	Emilia Due Borch	SelmaSiri Larsen	
Egypt	Hannah Dabees	No other competitors		
Estonia	Elina Goidina	Maria Eliise Kaljuvere	Elizabeth Nõu	
Finland	Iida Karhunen	Petra Lahti	Karina Innos	
France	Stefania Gladki	Eve Dubecq	Ninon Dapoigny	
Germany	Olesya Ray	Nikol Kalugina	Ina Jungmann	
(United Kingdom) Great Britain	Alexa Severn	Alice Smith	Emma Lyons	
Hong Kong	Ariel Guo	Chloe Desiree Leung	Andrea Guo	
Hungary	Polina Dzsumanyijazova	Martina Petra Major	Boglarka Zhang	
Iceland	Lena Rut Ásgeirsdóttir	Freydís Jóna Jing Bergsveinsdóttir	Dharma Elísabet Tómasdóttir	
(Republic of Ireland) Ireland	Allie Peterson	Saoirse O'Sullivan	No other competitors	
Israel	Sophia Shifrin	Anna Sheniuk	Anna Iushchenkova	
Japan	Mao Shimada	Ikura Kushida	Rena Uezono	
Kuwait	Dalal Al-Bader	No other competitors		
Latvia	Kira Baranovska	Nikola Fomčenkova	Jeļizavetas Derečinas	
Lithuania	Gabriele Juskaite	Agnė Ivanovaitė	Gabija Pociūtė	
Luxembourg	Ysaline Hibon	Rebecca Toft	No other competitors	
Mexico	Regina Garcia de León Saab	Cayetana González Ryabchikova	María Velazquez Toscano	
Netherlands	Emilia Soloukhin	Jolanda Vos	Naomi Wessels	
New Zealand	Renee Tsai	Mirika Armstrong	Misaki Joe	
North Macedonia	Deana Prilepcanska	Isidora Isjanovski	Milena Milojevikj	
Norway	Oda Havgar	Pernille With	Ida Vamnes	
Philippines	Cathryn Limketkai	Hayden Isabel Balucating	Kate Venturina Orrock	
Poland	Noelle Streuli	Weronika Ferlin	Zofia Bochenek	
Romania	Natalia Runcanu	Maria Smaranda	Tara-Maria Ienciu	
Russia	Margarita Bazylyuk	Alisa Dvoeglazova	Lidiya Pleskachyova	
Serbia	Ana Šćepanović	Dunja Trešnjić	Mia Milinković	
Slovakia	Olivia Lengyelova	Lucia Jackova	Terezia Puscova	
Slovenia	Zoja Kramar	Vita Kas	Zala Grum	
South Africa	Jasmine Coetzee	Ella Hawkes	Haley-Rae Thomson	
South Korea	Jang Ha-rin	Lee Ji-yoon	Kim Ji-yu	
Spain	Nahia Olaizola Muguruza	Alexandra Martínez Carbó	Sara Schiavone Recio	
Sweden	Alexandra Ödman	Lilly Almgren-Lidman	Leona Gebara	
Switzerland	Leandra Tzimpoukakis	Anastaia Brandenburg	Olivia Bacsa	
Thailand	Phattaratida Kaneshige	Pimmpida Lerdpraiwan	Chichaya Rungrattanaprasert	
Turkey	Selin Akbulut	Zeynep Naz Doğan	Derya Taygan	
Ukraine	Sofia Rymshyna	Varvara Parasochka	Khrystyna Galiareta	
United Arab Emirates	Elisa Westerhof	No other competitors		
United States	Logan Higase-Chen	Keira Hilbelink	Cleo Park	
Vietnam	Nguyễn Cao Hà Mi	Lê Diệu Hương	No other competitors	

=== Pairs ===
Championships	Gold	Silver	Bronze	Ref.
Australia	Peyton Bellamy-Martins / Kryshtof Pradeaux	No other competitors		
Belarus	Nadin Vityaz / Maksim Hritonenko	Angelina Buraya / Vladislav Saprykin	No other competitors	
Canada	Ava Kemp / Yohnatan Elizarov	Martina Ariano-Kent / Charly Laliberté-Laurent	Jazmine Desrochers / Kieran Thrasher	
Czech Republic	Debora Anna Cohen / Lukáš Vochozka	No other competitors		
France	Louise Ehrhard / Matthis Pellegris	Romane Télémaque / Lucas Coulon	Lise Regnier / Luca Nandrot	
Germany	Sonja Löwenherz / Robert Löwenherz	Aliyah Ackermann / Tobija Harms	Anastasia Steblyanka / Lukas Gneiding	
(United Kingdom) Great Britain	Lucy Hay / Kyle McLeod	No other competitors		
Israel	Sofia Enkina / Nikita Kovalenko	No other competitors		
Japan	Sae Shimizu / Lucas Tsuyoshi Honda	No other competitors		
Poland	Wiktoria Pacha / Szymon Derechowski	No other competitors		
Russia	Anastasia Chernyshova / Vladislav Vilchik	Vlada Selivanova / Viktor Potapov	Alisa Blinnikova / Aleksei Karpov	
Slovakia	Nikola Sitková / Oliver Kubačák	No other competitors		
Spain	Inés Moudden / Alejandro Lázaro García	Carolina Campillo / Pau Vilella	No other competitors	
Switzerland	Chiara Michaela Pazienza / Maxim Knorr	No other competitors		
Ukraine	Veronika Nagorna / Vadym Galiareta	No other competitors		
United States	Olivia Flores / Luke Wang	Naomi Williams / Lachlan Lewer	Sydney Cooke / Matthew Kennedy	

=== Ice dance ===
Championships	Gold	Silver	Bronze	Ref.
Armenia	Kristina Dobroserdova / Alessandro Pellegrini	No other competitors		
Australia	Renee Yuen / Oliver Ma	Regina Ng / Dominik Mautner	Amy Avtarovski / Charlie Wilcox	
Austria	Anita Straub / Andreas Straub	Elisabeth Havers / Leo Havers	No other competitors	
Belarus	Viktoriya Plaskonnaya / Vladislav Sytsik	Tat'yana Hadarkevich / Yaroslav Sytsik	Karolina Krasovskaya / Egor Tratsevskij	
Canada	Layla Veillon / Alexander Brandys	Chloe Nguyen / Brendan Giang	Alisa Korneva / Kieran MacDonald	
China	Lin Yufei / Gao Zijian	Li Xuantong / Wang Xinkang	Liu Tong / Ge Quanshuo	
Czech Republic	Eliška Žáková / Filip Mencl	Natálie Blaasová / Filip Blass	Lauren Audrey Batkova / Jacob Yang	
Estonia	Ksenia Shipunova / Miron Korjagin	No other competitors		
Finland	Hilda Taylor / Nolen Hickey	Enna Kesti / Oskari Liedenpohja	Cilla Laine / Urho Reina	
France	Ambre Perrier-Gianesini / Samuel Blanc-Klaperman	Célina Fradji / Jean-Hans Fourneaux	Alisa Ovsiankina / Maximilien Rahier	
Germany	Darya Grimm / Michail Savitskiy	Lilia Schubert / Nikita Remeshevskiy	Alexia Kruk / Jan Eisenhaber	
(United Kingdom) Great Britain	Ashlie Slatter / Atl Ongay-Perez	Lou Koch / Alexander Buchholdt	No other competitors	
Hungary	Villo Mira Szilagyi / Istvan Jaracs	No other competitors		
Israel	Elizabeth Tkachenko / Alexei Kiliakov	No other competitors		
Italy	Noemi Tali / Noah Lafornara	Beatrice Ventura / Stefano Frasca	Vittoria Petracchi / Daniel Basile	
Japan	Sara Kishimoto / Atsuhiko Tamura	Kaho Yamashita / Yuto Nagata	No other competitors	
New Zealand	Gemma Pickering / Benji Pickering	No other competitors		
Poland	Sofiia Dovhal / Wiktor Kulesza	Julia Berendt / Mateusz Dąbrowski	No other competitors	
Russia	Ekaterina Rybakova / Ivan Makhnonosov	Anna Kolomenskaya / Artem Frolov	Anna Shcherbakova / Egor Goncharov	
South Africa	Felicity Chase / Mikhail Ajam	Ella Hawkes / Jonathan Wilson	No other competitors	
South Korea	Kim Jin-ny / Lee Na-mu	No other competitors		
Spain	Sarah Marcilly Vázquez / Jolan Engel	Athena Roberts / Eric Bosquet	Elena Peña / Antonio Peña	
Switzerland	Gina Zehnder / Beda Leon Sieber	Seraina Tscharner / Laurin Wiederkehr	Eléonore Gabet / Maxime Evéquoz	
Ukraine	Polina Kapustina / Mykhailo Kliuev	Sofia Rekunova / Denys Fediakin	Vira Fahradova / Oleksandr Kapryshanskyi	
United States	Leah Neset / Artem Markelov	Yahli Pedersen / Jeffrey Chen	Elliana Peal / Ethan Peal	
