= 2022–23 national figure skating championships =

- Type: National championship
- Season: 2022–23
- Host: ISU member nations
- Previous: 2021–22
- Next: 2023–24

National figure skating championships for the 2022–23 season took place mainly from December 2022 to January 2023. They were held to crown national champions and to serve as part of the selection process for international events, such as the 2023 ISU Championships. Medals were awarded in the disciplines of men's singles, women's singles, pairs, and ice dance. A few countries chose to organize their national championships together with their neighbors; the results were subsequently divided into national podiums.

== Competitions ==
Key

Nationals	Other domestic

Date	Event	Type	Level	Disc.	Location	Results
2022
July 22–24	Brazilian Championships	Nat.	Sen.–Nov.	M/W	São Paulo, Brazil	
August 27-28	Argentine Championships	Nat.	Sen.–Nov.	W	Ushuaia, Argentina	
October 1-2	Vietnamese Championships	Nat.	Sen.–Nov.	M/W/D	Hanoi, Vietnam	
October 6–8	Master's de Patinage	Other	Sen.–Jun.	All	Villard-de-Lans, France	
October 18-21	New Zealand Championships	Nat.	Sen.–Nov.	M/W/D	Auckland, New Zealand	
October 28–29	Romanian Championships	Nat.	Sen.–Jun.	M/W	Otopeni, Romania	
October 29–30	Chinese Taipei Championships	Nat.	Sen.–Nov.	M/W	Taipei, Taiwan (Chinese Taipei)	
November 15-20	Mexican Championships	Nat.	Sen.–Nov.	M/W	Naucalpan, Mexico	
November 18–19	Belgian Championships	Nat.	Sen.–Nov.	M/W	Mechelen, Belgium	
November 19-20	Icelandic Championships	Nat.	Jun.–Nov.	W	Reykjavík, Iceland	
November 25–27	Japan Junior Champ.	Nat.	Junior	All	Hitachinaka, Japan	
Nov 25 – Dec 2	Australian Championships	Nat.	Sen.–Nov.	All	Boondall, Australia	
November 26-27	Serbian Championships	Nat.	Sen.–Nov.	W	Belgrade, Serbia	
Nov 30 – Dec 3	Skate Canada Challenge	Other	Sen.–Jun.	All	Winnipeg, Manitoba, Canada	
December 2–4	British Championships	Nat.	Sen.–Nov.	All	Sheffield, United Kingdom	
December 3–4	Danish Championships	Nat.	Sen.–Nov.	M/W/D	Rødovre, Denmark	
December 3–4	Lithuanian Championships	Nat.	Sen.–Nov.	M/W	Kaunas, Lithuania	
December 14–15	Israeli Championships	Nat.	Sen.–Nov.	M/W/D	Holon, Israel	
December 14–18	Austrian Championships	Nat.	Sen.–Nov.	All	Sankt Pölten, Austria	
December 15–16	Swiss Championships	Nat.	Senior	M/W/D	Chur, Switzerland	
December 15–17	French Championships	Nat.	Senior	All	Rouen, France	
December 15–17	Four Nationals (Czech/Hungarian/Polish/Slovak)	Nat.	Sen.–Jun.	All	Budapest, Hungary	
December 15–17	Swedish Championships	Nat.	Sen.-Nov.	M/W/P	Boras, Sweden	
December 15–18	Italian Championships	Nat.	Sen.–Jun.	All	Bruneck, Italy	
December 15–18	Belarusian Championships	Nat.	Sen.	All	Minsk, Belarus	
December 15–18	Bulgarian Championships	Nat.	Sen.–Nov.	M/W	Sofia, Bulgaria	
December 14–18	German Junior Champ.	Nat.	Jun.–Nov.	M/W	Oberstdorf, Germany	
December 16–18	Spanish Championships	Nat.	Sen.–Nov.	All	Madrid, Spain	
December 16–18	Finnish Championships	Nat.	Senior	All	Joensuu, Finland	
December 16–19	Latvian Championships	Nat.	Senior	M/W	Riga, Latvia	
December 17	Peruvian Championships	Nat.	Jun.	W	Lima, Peru	
December 17–18	Estonian Championships	Nat.	Senior	M/W	Tallinn, Estonia	
December 17–18	Slovenian Championships	Nat.	Senior	M/W	Jesenice, Slovenia	
December 19–20	Philippine Championships	Nat.	Sen.-Nov.	M/W/P	Manila, Philippines	
December 20–25	Russian Championships	Nat.	Senior	All	Krasnoyarsk, Russia	
December 21–25	Japan Championships	Nat.	Senior	All	Kadoma, Japan	
December 22–23	Chinese Junior Champ.	Nat.	Junior	All	Online	
December 23–25	Turkish Championships	Nat.	Sen.–Jun.	M/W	Ankara, Turkey	
2023
January 4-8	Indian Championships	Nat.	Sen.-Jun.		Gurugram, India	
January 5–7	German Championships	Nat.	Sen.–Nov.	All	Oberstdorf, Germany	
January 5–8	South Korean Championships	Nat.	Sen.–Jun.	All	Uijeongbu, South Korea	
January 9–15	Canadian Championships	Nat.	Sen.–Jun.	All	Oshawa, Ontario, Canada	
January 11–13	Chinese Championships	Nat.	Sen.	All	Chengde, China	
January 13-14	Croatian Championships	Nat.	Sen.-Nov.	M/W	Zagreb, Croatia	
January 13-15	Hungarian Junior Champ.	Nat.	Jun.–Nov.	M/W/D	Budapest, Hungary	
January 13-15	Norwegian Championships	Nat.	Sen.–Nov.	M/W	Trondheim, Norway	
January 20-22	Polish Junior Champ.	Nat.	Junior	M/W	Katowice-Janow, Poland	
January 21-22	Swiss Junior Champ.	Nat.	Junior	M/W	Dübendorf, Switzerland	
January 23–29	U.S. Championships	Nat.	Sen.–Jun.	All	San Jose, California, United States	
February 3–4	Czech Junior Champ.	Nat.	Junior	M/W	Strakonice, Czech Republic	
February 3–5	French Junior Champ.	Nat.	Junior	All	Bordeaux, France	
February 4–5	Estonian Junior Champ.	Nat.	Junior	M/W	Tallinn, Estonia	
February	Egyptian Championships	Other	Jun.–Nov.	W	Virtual	
February 14–18	Russian Junior Champ.	Nat.	Junior	All	Perm, Russia	
February 23–26	Dutch Championships	Nat.	Sen.–Nov.	W/P/D	Tilburg, Netherlands	
February 24-25	Macedonian Championships	Nat.	Sen.–Nov.	W	Skopje, North Macedonia	
March 1-5	Russian Grand Prix Final	Other	Sen.–Jun.	All	Saint Petersburg, Russia	
March 4-5	Liechtenstein Championships	Nat.	Nov.	M/W	Chur, Switzerland	
March 10-12	Singaporean Championships	Nat.	Sen.–Nov.	M/W	Jurong East, Singapore	
March 13-14	South African Championships	Nat.	Sen.–Nov.	All	Centurion, South Africa	
March 14-15	Indonesian Championships	Nat.	Sen.-Nov.	M/W	Jakarta, Indonesia	
March 15-17	Ukrainian Junior Championships	Nat.	Jun.-Nov.	M/W		
March 17-19	Luxembourgish Championships	Nat.	Jun.-Nov.	W	Kockelscheuer, Luxembourg	
March 17-19	UAE Championships	Nat.	Nov.	W	Abu Dhabi, UAE	
March 18-19	Slovak Junior Championships	Nat.	Jun.-Nov.	M/W/P	Liptovský Mikuláš, Slovakia	
March 30-April 2	Thai Championships	Nat.	Sen.-Nov.	M/W	Bangkok, Thailand	
April 1	Andorran Championships	Nat.	Jun.-Nov.	M/W	Canillo, Andorra	
April 7-9	Ukrainian Championships	Nat.	Sen.	M/W/P	Bohuslav, Ukraine	
May 6	Cypriot Championships	Nat.	Sen.–Nov.	W/D	Limassol, Cyprus	
May 7-9	Kyrgyz Championships	Nat.	Sen.–Nov.	W/D	Bishkek, Kyrgyzstan	
May 17-18	Malaysian Championships	Nat.	Sen.–Nov.	M/W	Kuala Lumpur, Malaysia	
May 30-31	Hong Kong Championships	Nat.	Sen.–Nov.	M/W	Kowloon Tong, Hong Kong	
June 17-18	Irish Championships	Nat.	Sen.-Nov.	M/W/D	Dundee, Scotland	

== Senior medalists ==
=== Senior men ===
Men
Nation	Gold	Silver	Bronze	Refs
Australia	Darian Kaptich	Charlton Doherty	Callum Bradshaw	
Austria	Maurizio Zandron	Luc Maierhofer	Anton Skoficz	
Belarus	Alexander Lebedev	Vasilij Borohovskij	Yauhenii Puzanau	
Brazil	Leonardo de Araújo	Arthur Casado	Derrick Camargo	
Bulgaria	Larry Loupolover	Beat Shyumperli	Filip Kaymakchiev	
Canada	Keegan Messing	Conrad Orzel	Wesley Chiu	
China	Chen Yudong	Han Wenbao	Dai Daiwei	
Chinese Taipei	Yeh Che-Yu	Lin Fang-Yi	—N/a	
Croatia	Jari Kessler	—N/a		
Czech Republic	Petr Kotlařík	Georgii Reshtenko	—N/a	
Denmark	Nikolaj Mølgaard Pedersen	—N/a		
Estonia	Mihhail Selevko	Aleksandr Selevko	Arlet Levandi	
Finland	Valtter Virtanen	Makar Suntsev	Matias Lindfors	
France	Adam Siao Him Fa	Kévin Aymoz	François Pitot	
Germany	Nikita Starostin	Kai Jagoda	Lotfi Sereir	
(United Kingdom) Great Britain	Graham Newberry	Edward Appleby	Henry Privett-Mendoza	
Hong Kong	Yuen Lap Kan Lincoln	Leung Kwun Hung	Wong Wai Chung Adonis	
Hungary	Aleksandr Vlasenko	Mózes József Berei	Aleksei Vlasenko	
(Republic of Ireland) Ireland	Dillon Judge	—N/a		
Israel	Mark Gorodnitsky	Lev Vinokur	—N/a	
Italy	Matteo Rizzo	Nikolaj Memola	Gabriele Frangipani	
Japan	Shoma Uno	Koshiro Shimada	Kazuki Tomono	
Latvia	Deniss Vasiļjevs	—N/a		
Malaysia	Fang Ze Zeng	—N/a		
Mexico	Donovan Carrillo	—N/a		
Netherlands	Iwan van Hulst	—N/a		
New Zealand	Douglas Gerber	—N/a		
Norway	Jann William Eraker	—N/a		
Philippines	Edrian Paul Celestino	—N/a		
Poland	Vladimir Samoilov	Miłosz Witkowski	Kornel Witkowski	
Romania	Christian Nainer	Andrei Tudor-Dominic	Anelin George Enache	
Russia	Evgeni Semenenko	Petr Gumennik	Alexander Samarin	
Singapore	Pagiel Yie Ke Sng	—N/a		
Slovakia	Adam Hagara	—N/a		
Slovenia	David Sedej	—N/a		
South Africa	Evan Wrensch	—N/a		
South Korea	Cha Jun-hwan	Kim Hyun-gyeom	Seo Min-kyu	
Spain	Tomàs-Llorenç Guarino Sabaté	Pablo García	Euken Alberdi Martínez	
Sweden	Andreas Nordebäck	Nikolaj Majorov	Gabriel Folkesson	
Switzerland	Nurullah Sahaka	Micha Steffen	Noah Bodenstein	
Turkey	Burak Demirboğa	Alp Eren Özkan	—N/a	
Ukraine	Kyrylo Marsak	Glib Smotrov	Sergiy Sokolov	
United States	Ilia Malinin	Jason Brown	Andrew Torgashev	

=== Senior women ===
Women
Nation	Gold	Silver	Bronze	Refs
Argentina	Michelle Di Cicco	—N/a		
Australia	Vlada Vasiliev	Hana Bath	Andrea Guo	
Austria	Emily Saari	Sophia Schaller	Stefanie Pesendorfer	
Belarus	Viktoriia Safonova	Varvara Kisel	Valeriya Ezhova	
Belgium	Loena Hendrickx	Jade Hovine	—N/a	
Brazil	Ana Carla Decottignies	—N/a		
Bulgaria	Alexandra Feigin	Kristina Grigorova	Simona Georgieva	
Canada	Madeline Schizas	Kaiya Ruiter	Fiona Bombardier	
China	An Xiangyi	Li Ruotang	Tong Ruichen	
Chinese Taipei	Ting Tzu-Han	Amanda Hsu	—N/a	
Croatia	Hana Cvijanovic	Lorena Cizmek	Luce Stipanicev	
Cyprus	Marilena Kitromilis	—N/a		
Czech Republic	Barbora Vránková	Eliška Březinová	Nikola Rychtaříková	
Denmark	Maia Sørensen	Annika Skibby	Freja Juel Jensen	
Estonia	Niina Petrõkina	Nataly Langerbaur	Gerli Liinamäe	
Finland	Janna Jyrkinen	Nella Pelkonen	Minja Peltonen	
France	Léa Serna	Lorine Schild	Maïa Mazzara	
Germany	Nicole Schott	Kristina Isaev	Elisabeth Jäger	
(United Kingdom) Great Britain	Natasha McKay	Kristen Spours	Nina Povey	
Hong Kong	Joanna So	Yu Hoi Tik Rachel	Chan Sin Ying Janice	
Hungary	Júlia Láng	Katinka Anna Zsembery	Lili Krizsanovszki	
Indonesia	Fayrena Azlia Keisha	—N/a		
Israel	Mariia Seniuk	Ella Chen	Elizabet Gervits	
Italy	Lara Naki Gutmann	Ginevra Negrello	Anna Pezzetta	
Japan	Kaori Sakamoto	Mai Mihara	Mao Shimada	
Latvia	Sofja Stepčenko	Angelīna Kučvaļska	Elizabete Jubkāne	
Lithuania	Aleksandra Golovkina	Daria Afinogenova	Jogailė Aglinskytė	
Malaysia	Katherine Ong Pui Kuan	—N/a		
Mexico	Andrea Astrain Maynez	Ximena Figueroa	Florencia Calderon Arpee	
Netherlands	Lindsay van Zundert	—N/a		
North Macedonia	Larisa Bogatinovska	—N/a		
Norway	Mia Caroline Risa Gomez	Linnea Kolstad Kilsand	Ingeborg Cecilie Slørdahl Tellefsen	
New Zealand	Jocelyn Hong	Ruth Xu	Danielle Gebser	
Philippines	Sofia Frank	Skye Chua	Skye Frances Patenia	
Poland	Ekaterina Kurakova	Karolina Białas	Zofia Grzegorzewska	
Romania	Julia Sauter	Andreea Ramona Voicu	Denisa Comanescu	
Russia	Sofia Akateva	Kamila Valieva	Elizaveta Tuktamysheva	
Serbia	Antonina Dubinina	—N/a		
Singapore	Cheryl Wen Wei Wee	Xinyi Loke	—N/a	
Slovakia	Alexandra Michaela Filcová	Ema Doboszová	Vanesa Šelmeková	
Slovenia	Daša Grm	Manca Krmelj	Maria Lena Daud	
South Africa	Abigail Samuels	—N/a		
South Korea	Shin Ji-a	Kim Ye-lim	Lee Hae-in	
Spain	Marie Kolly	María Torres	Lucía Manzano	
Sweden	Emelie Ling	Josefin Taljegård	Julia Brovall	
Switzerland	Livia Kaiser	Kimmy Repond	Sarina Joos	
Thailand	Teekhree Silpa-Archa	—N/a		
Turkey	Salma Agamova	Özlem Dizmen	—N/a	
Ukraine	Anastasia Gozhva	Taisiia Spesivtseva	Yelyzaveta Babenko	
United States	Isabeau Levito	Bradie Tennell	Amber Glenn	
Vietnam	Ngan Hoang Ngao	Phuong Ha Pham Le	—N/a	

=== Senior pairs ===
Pairs
Nation	Gold	Silver	Bronze	Refs
Austria	Sophia Schaller / Livio Mayr	—N/a		
Belarus	Bogdana Lukashevich / Alexander Stepanov	Ekaterina Yurova / Dmitrij Bushlanov	—N/a	
Canada	Deanna Stellato-Dudek / Maxime Deschamps	Brooke McIntosh / Benjamin Mimar	Lia Pereira / Trennt Michaud	
China	Zhang Siyang / Yang Yongchao	Wang Huidi / Jia Ziqi	Zhang Jiaxuan / Huang Yihang	
Czech Republic	Federica Simioli / Alessandro Zabro	—N/a		
Finland	Miania Väänänen / Filippo Clerici	—N/a		
France	Camille Kovalev / Pavel Kovalev	Oxana Vouillamoz / Flavien Giniaux	Aurélie Faula / Théo Belle	
Germany	Annika Hocke / Robert Kunkel	Letizia Roscher / Luis Schuster	—N/a	
(United Kingdom) Great Britain	Anastasia Vaipan-Law / Luke Digby	Lydia Smart / Harry Mattick	—N/a	
Hungary	Mária Pavlova / Aleksei Sviatchenko	—N/a		
Italy	Sara Conti / Niccolò Macii	Rebecca Ghilardi / Filippo Ambrosini	Lucrezia Beccari / Matteo Guarise	
Japan	Haruna Murakami / Sumitada Moriguchi	—N/a		
Netherlands	Nika Osipova / Dmitry Epstein	Daria Danilova / Michel Tsiba	—N/a	
Philippines	Isabella Gamez / Alexander Korovin	—N/a		
Russia	Aleksandra Boikova / Dmitrii Kozlovskii	Anastasia Mishina / Aleksandr Galliamov	Evgenia Tarasova / Vladimir Morozov	
South Africa	Julia Mauder / Johannes Wilkinson	—N/a		
South Korea	Cho Hye-jin / Steven Adcock	—N/a		
Sweden	Greta Crafoord / John Crafoord	—N/a		
Ukraine	Sofiia Holichenko / Artem Darenskyi	—N/a		
United States	Alexa Knierim / Brandon Frazier	Emily Chan / Spencer Howe	Ellie Kam / Daniel O'Shea	

=== Senior ice dance ===
Ice dance
Nation	Gold	Silver	Bronze	Refs
Australia	India Nette / Eron Westwood	—N/a		
Austria	Corinna Huber / Patrik Huber	—N/a		
Belarus	Karina Sidarenka / Maksim Yalenich	Elizaveta Novik / Oleksandr Kukharevskyi	—N/a	
Canada	Laurence Fournier Beaudry / Nikolaj Sørensen	Marjorie Lajoie / Zachary Lagha	Marie-Jade Lauriault / Romain Le Gac	
China	Chen Xizi / Xing Jianing	Li Xuantong / Wang Xinkang	Zhang Meihong / Meng Bolin	
Czech Republic	Natálie Taschlerová / Filip Taschler	Denisa Cimlová / Joti Polizoakis	—N/a	
Denmark	Elisabetta Incardona / Rafael Marc Drozd Musil	—N/a		
Finland	Juulia Turkkila / Matthias Versluis	Yuka Orihara / Juho Pirinen	—N/a	
France	Evgeniia Lopareva / Geoffrey Brissaud	Loïcia Demougeot / Théo le Mercier	Lou Terreaux / Noé Perron	
Germany	Jennifer Janse van Rensburg / Benjamin Steffan	Charise Matthaei / Max Liebers	—N/a	
(United Kingdom) Great Britain	Lilah Fear / Lewis Gibson	Eleanor Hirst / Anthony Currie	Charlotte Man / Toby Palmer	
Hungary	Mariia Ignateva / Danijil Szemko	Lucy Hancock / Ilias Fourati	—N/a	
(Republic of Ireland) Ireland	Carolane Soucisse / Shane Firus	—N/a		
Israel	Elizabeth Tkachenko / Alexei Kiliakov	Mariia Nosovitskaya / Mikhail Nosovitskiy	—N/a	
Italy	Charlène Guignard / Marco Fabbri	Victoria Manni / Carlo Röthlisberger	Carolina Portesi Peroni / Michael Chrastecky	
Japan	Kana Muramoto / Daisuke Takahashi	Misato Komatsubara / Tim Koleto	Nicole Takahashi / Shiloh Judd	
Netherlands	Chelsea Verhaegh / Sherim van Geffen	Hanna Jakucs / Alessio Galli	—N/a	
New Zealand	Charlotte Lafond-Fournier / Richard Kam	Isabelle Guise / Ethan Alday	—N/a	
Poland	Anastasia Polibina / Pavel Golovishnikov	Olivia Oliver / Elliot Graham	Oleksandra Borysova / Aaron Freeman	
Russia	Elizaveta Khudaiberdieva / Egor Bazin	Elizaveta Shanaeva / Pavel Drozd	Elizaveta Pasechnik / Maxim Nekrasov	
Slovakia	Anna Simova / Kirill Aksenov	Maria Sofia Pucherova / Nikita Lysak	—N/a	
Switzerland	Arianna Sassi / Luca Morini	—N/a		
United States	Madison Chock / Evan Bates	Caroline Green / Michael Parsons	Christina Carreira / Anthony Ponomarenko	

== Junior medalists ==
=== Junior men ===
Junior men
Nation	Gold	Silver	Bronze	Refs
Australia	Julio Potapenko	Vinceman Chong	Jeremy Adamlu	
Belgium	Denis Krouglov	—N/a		
Bulgaria	Rosen Peev	Alexander Kachamakov	—N/a	
Canada	Edward Nicholas Vasii	Grayson Long	Anthony Paradis	
China	Chen Yudong	Han Wenbao	Zhiuau Jiang	
Chinese Taipei	Li Yu-Hsiang	Huang Yu-Chun	Zhou Guan-Ting	
Denmark	Dimitri Steffensen	—N/a		
Estonia	Arlet Levandi	Jegor Martsenko	—N/a	
Finland	Jari Krestyannikov	Matias Heinonen	Severi Varpio	
France	Ian Vauclin	Ilia Gogitidze	Axel Ahmed	
Germany	Luca Fünfer	Hugo Willi Herrmann	Alexander Vlascenko	
(United Kingdom) Great Britain	Freddie Leggott	Jedidiah Lincoln	Connor Bray	
Hong Kong	Cheung Chiu Hei	Jarvis Ho	Chow Chit Wang	
Hungary	Alexandr Vlasenko	Aleksei Vlasenko	Máté Csaba	
Czech Republic	Damian Malczyk	Jindřich Klement	Vojtěch Warisch	
Indonesia	Betrand Zeusef Zuriel	—N/a		
Israel	Tamir Kuperman	Nikita Kovalenko	Yakov Pogrebinskii	
Italy	Matteo Nalbone	Tommaso Barison	Aiden Buttiero Khorev	
Japan	Nozomu Yoshioka	Takeru Amine Kataise	Haruya Sasaki	
Kyrgyzstan	Danil Petrenko	—N/a		
Latvia	Kirills Korkačs	Antons Trofimovs	Ratmirs Bekišbajevs	
Lithuania	Daniel Korabelnik	—N/a		
Mexico	Emilio Mariscal Pacheco	—N/a		
New Zealand	Yanhao Li	—N/a		
Poland	Matvii Yefymenko	Jakub Lofek	Jakub Roslaniec	
Romania	Andrei Tudor-Dominic	—N/a		
Russia	Arseny Fedotov	Lev Lazarev	Grigory Fedorov	
Slovakia	Lucas Vaclavik	Dmitry Rudenko	Jakub Galbavy	
South Africa	Nicolas van de Vijver	Cody Kock	Jonathan Wilson	
South Korea	Choi Ha-bin	Park Hyun-seo	Kim Ye-sung	
Spain	Daniel Morcillo	Adrián Baldomero	Mahery Randrianarivony	
Sweden	Jonathan Egyptson	Casper Johansson	Erik Pellnor	
Switzerland	Aurélian Chervet	Georgii Pavlov	Taigo Thomas Sakai	
Turkey	Ali Efe Günes	Furkan Emre İncel	Efe Ergin Dinçer	
Ukraine	Egor Kurtsev	Lev Myshkovets	Lev Karasevych	
United States	Lucas Broussard	Jacob Sanchez	Robert Yampolsky	
Vietnam	Phuc Hoang Phan	—N/a		

=== Junior women ===
Junior women
Nation	Gold	Silver	Bronze	Refs
Andorra	Ainara Zazo Díaz	—N/a		
Argentina	Cecilia Donohue	Sofia Dayan	Luana Beltran	
Australia	Hana Bath	Ariel Guo	Luna Shimogaki	
Austria	Hannah Frank	Flora Marie Schaller	Dorotea Leitgeb	
Belgium	Giulia Castorini	Charlotte Jennes	Jolien Jennes	
Brazil	Maria Joaquina Reikdal	Beatriz da Costa Dolberth	—N/a	
Bulgaria	Chiara Hristova	Krista Georgieva	Marina Nikolova	
Canada	Hetty Shi	Rose Théroux	Aleksa Volkova	
China	Megan Wong	Xu Wandi	Cheng Jiaying	
Chinese Taipei	Sadie Shen Weng	Lin Yan-Yi	Audrey Lin	
Croatia	Meri Marinac	Lena Cusak	Nevia Ana Medic	
Cyprus	Stefania Yakovleva	—N/a		
Czech Republic	Barbora Tykalová	Kateřina Hanušová	Adéla Vallová	
Denmark	Anna-Flora Colmor Jepsen	Selma Larsen	Camilla Vinther Poulsen	
Egypt	Hannah Dabees	—N/a		
Estonia	Niina Petrõkina	Maria Eliise Kaljuvere	Nataly Langerbaur	
Finland	Iida Karhunen	Rosa Reponen	Petra Lahti	
France	Lorine Schild	Clémence Mayindu	Eve Dubecq	
Germany	Olesya Ray	Valentina Andrianova	Anna Grekul	
(United Kingdom) Great Britain	Alexa Severn	Alana Pang	Emma Lyons	
Hong Kong	Tsz Ching Chan	Xue Yun	Megan Wong	
Hungary	Polina Dzsumanyijazova	Léna Ekker	Dária Zsirnov	
Iceland	Júlía Sylvía Gunnarsdóttir	Freydís Jóna Jing Bergsveinsdóttir	Lena Rut Ásgeirsdóttir	
Indonesia	Michelle Edgina Axille	Melody Asri Fatimah	Chilly Ann Sintana Wongso	
(Republic of Ireland) Ireland	Sophia Tkacheva	Ciera Turner-Frick	—N/a	
Israel	Gabriela Grinberg	Mariia Dmitrieva	Anna Sheniuk	
Italy	Amanda Ghezzo	Elena Agostinelli	Giulia Barucchi	
Japan	Mao Shimada	Mone Chiba	Ami Nakai	
Kyrgyzstan	Zhasmin Shlaga	Sofiia Shubina	—N/a	
Latvia	Nikola Fomčenkova	Lueta Siliņa	Paula Nelsone	
Lithuania	Meda Variakojytė	Darija Reginėvič	Jalizaveta Kovalova	
Luxembourg	Ysaline Hibon	Rebecca Toft	—N/a	
Malaysia	Sueanne Lam Sze Em	Oh Wei Xuan	Afrina Diyanah Mohammad Oryza Ananda	
Mexico	Natalia Acosta Moises	Regina Garcia de Leon Saab	Victoria Tabe Artasanchez	
Netherlands	Jolanda Vos	Emilia Soloukhin	Nazomi van Bergen	
New Zealand	Misaki Joe	Cara Tang	Mirika Armstrong	
North Macedonia	Jana Kukovska	Deana Prilepcanska	Milena Milojevikj	
Norway	Oda Tønnesen Havgar	Kaia Kleven	Christina Jensen	
Peru	Alexandra Hildinger	—N/a		
Philippines	Cathryn Limketkai	Hayden Balucating	Felicity Cristobelle Eco	
Poland	Noelle Streuli	Weronika Ferlin	Aleksandra Janikowska	
Romania	Luiza Ilie	Ruxandra Rotundu	Ingrid Pricop	
Russia	Alina Gorbacheva	Veronika Zhilina	Maria Gordeeva	
Serbia	Ivona Kleut	Ana Scepanovic	Mia Milinkovic	
Singapore	Vianna Shen-Rou Linke	Joyce Yue En Yang	McKayla Ong	
Slovakia	Olivia Lengyelova	Vanesa Selmekova	Terezia Pocsova	
Slovenia	Julija Lovrenčič	Zoja Kramar	Klara Sekardi	
South Africa	Gian-Quen Isaacs	Jasmine Coetzee	Ella Hawkes	
South Korea	Kim Yu-seong	Lee Ji-yoon	Kim Ye-eun	
Spain	Celia Cabanillas	Nahia Olaizola	Nuria Serrano	
Sweden	Nina Fredriksson	Josefin Brovall	Miranda Lundgren	
Switzerland	Anthea Gradinaru	Sophie Joline Von Felten	Leandra Tzimpoukakis	
Thailand	Phattaratida Kaneshige	Pimmpida Lerdpraiwan	Angelina Ismalone	
Turkey	Azra Ulus	Anna Deniz Ozdemir	Sena Lidya Bayraktaroğlu	
Ukraine	Olena Horsunenko	Ulyana Karychynska	Polina Sherbynah	
United States	Soho Lee	Keira Hilbelink	Elyce Lin-Gracey	
Vietnam	Linh Kanh Tran	—N/a		

=== Junior pairs ===
Junior pairs
Nation	Gold	Silver	Bronze	Refs
Austria	Giorgia Ghedini / Luc Maierhofer	—N/a		
Canada	Chloe Panetta / Kieran Thrasher	Ava Kemp / Yohnatan Elizarov	Martina Ariano Kent / Alexis Leduc	
China	Yang Yixi / Deng Shunyang	—N/a		
Czech Republic	Barbora Kuciánová / Lukáš Vochozka	—N/a		
France	Oxana Vouillamoz / Flavien Giniaux	Louise Ehrhard / Mathis Pellegris	—N/a	
Germany	Sonja Löwenherz / Robert Löwenherz	Aliyah Ackermann / Tobija Harms	Josephine Lossius / Artem Rotar	
(United Kingdom) Great Britain	Lucy Hay / Kyle McLeod	Neamh Davison / Shailesh Caller	—N/a	
Italy	Irina Napolitano / Edoardo Comi	Giorgia Burin / Alberto Tommasi	—N/a	
Japan	Haruna Murakami / Sumitada Moriguchi	—N/a		
Russia	Ekaterina Chikmareva / Matvei Ianchenkov	Iuliia Artemeva / Aleksei Briukhanov	Elizaveta Osokina / Artem Gritsaenko	
Slovakia	Nikola Sitková / Oliver Kubačák	—N/a		
Spain	Inés Moudden / Alejandro García	Linda de Nardin / Patrizio Rossi	—N/a	
United States	Ellie Korytek / Timmy Chapman	Naomi Williams / Lachlan Lewer	Lilianna Murray / Jordan Gillette	

=== Junior ice dance ===
Junior ice dance
Nation	Gold	Silver	Bronze	Refs
Austria	Anita Straub / Andreas Straub	—N/a		
Canada	Nadiia Bashynska / Peter Beaumont	Sandrine Gauthier / Quentin Thieren	Hailey Yu / Brendan Giang	
China	Lin Yufei / Gao Zijian	Li Xuantong / Wang Xinkang	Yin Shanjie / Yang Shirui	
Cyprus	Angelina Kudryavtseva / Ilia Karankevich	—N/a		
Czech Republic	Kateřina Mrázková / Daniel Mrázek	Natálie Blaasova / Filip Blaas	Andrea Psurna / Jachym Novak	
Finland	Hilda Taylor / Urho Reina	—N/a		
France	Louise Bordet / Thomas Gipoulou	Célina Fradji / Jean-Hans Fourneaux	Ambre Perrier-Gianesini / Samuel Blanc-Klaperman	
Germany	Darya Grimm / Michail Savitskiy	Karla Maria Karl / Kai Hoferichter	Alexia Kruk / Jan Eisenhaber	
(United Kingdom) Great Britain	Phebe Bekker / James Hernandez	Ashlie Slatter / Atl Ongay-Perez	Molly Hairsine / Alessio Surenkov-Gultchev	
Hungary	Maya Benkiewicz / Mark Shapiro	—N/a		
(Republic of Ireland) Ireland	Laura Hegarty / Kevin Hegarty	—N/a		
Israel	Mishel Moshaiev / Dmytro Kravchenko	—N/a		
Italy	Noemi Tali / Stefano Frasca	Giorgia Galimberti / Matteo Mandelli	Alice Pizzorni / Massimiliano Bucciarelli	
Japan	Nao Kida / Masaya Morita	Sara Kishimoto / Atsuhiko Tamura	Kaho Yamashita / Yuto Nagata	
New Zealand	Lucienne Holtz / Tim Bradfield	—N/a		
Poland	Sofiia Dovhal / Wiktor Kulesza	—N/a		
Russia	Anna Shcherbakova / Egor Goncharov	Sofia Leontieva / Daniil Gorelkin	Ekaterina Rybakova / Ivan Makhnonosov	
South Africa	Felicity Chase / Mikhail Ajam	—N/a		
South Korea	Hannah Lim / Ye Quan	Kim Jin-ny / Lee Nam-u	—N/a	
Spain	Athena Faith / Eric Alis	Eloanne Ogor / Raul Bermejo	Elena Peña / Antonio Peña	
United States	Leah Neset / Artem Markelov	Helena Carhart / Volodymyr Horovyi	Jenna Hauer / Benjamin Starr	
Vietnam	Chi Linh Nguyen / Minh Quang Nguyen	—N/a		
