= 2024–25 national figure skating championships =

- Type: National championship
- Season: 2024–25
- Host: ISU member nations
- Previous: 2023–24
- Next: 2025–26

National figure skating championships for the 2024–25 season began on July 1, 2024, and ended on June 30, 2025, with most competitions taking place from December 2024 to January 2025. They were held to crown national champions and to serve as part of the selection process for international events, such as the 2025 ISU Championships. Medals were awarded in the disciplines of men's singles, women's singles, pairs, and ice dance. Several countries chose to organize their national championships together with their neighbors; the results were subsequently divided into national podiums.

== National competitions ==
Code key

- S – Senior event
- J – Junior event
- N – Novice event
- M – Men's singles
- W – Women's singles
- P – Pair skating
- D – Ice dance

Color key

- National championships
- Other domestic competition

2024–25
Dates	Event	Type	Level	Disc.	Location	Results
July 18–21	Brazilian Championships	Nationals	All	M/W	São Paulo, Brazil	
August 16–17	Indian Championships	Nationals	All	M/W	Gurgaon, India	
September 18–19	Indonesian Championships	Nationals	All	M/W	Jakarta, Indonesia	
September 26–28	Master's de Patinage	Other	S/J	All	Villard-de-Lans, France	
October 17–20	New Zealand Championships	Nationals	All	M/W	Christchurch, New Zealand	
October 18–20	Japan Novice Championships	Nationals	Novice	All	Amagasaki, Japan	
October 23–24	Chinese Taipei Championships	Nationals	All	M/W/D	Taipei, Taiwan	
October 23–27	Romanian Championships	Nationals	Senior	W	Otopeni, Romania	
November 1–3	Vietnamese Championships	Nationals	All	M/W	Hanoi, Vietnam	
November 7–8	Philippine Championships	Nationals	All	M/W	Pasay, Philippines	
November 14–15	Chinese Junior Championships	Nationals	Junior	All	Jilin City, Jilin Province	
November 17–19	Japan Junior Championships	Nationals	Junior	All	Hiroshima, Japan	
November 18–24	Mexican Championships	Nationals	All	M/W/D	Metepec, Mexico	
November 23–24	Argentine Championships	Nationals	S/J	W	Buenos Aires, Argentina	
November 23–24	Serbian Championships	Nationals	All	M/W	Belgrade, Serbia	
November 27 – December 1	British Championships	Nationals	All	All	Sheffield, England, United Kingdom	
November 28 – December 1	Skate Canada Challenge	Other	All	All	Winnipeg, Manitoba, Canada	
November 29 – December 1	Icelandic Championships	Nationals	All	M/W/D	Reykjavík, Iceland	
November 29 – December 6	Australian Championships	Nationals	All	M/W/D	Docklands, Victoria, Australia	
November 29 – December 1	Chinese Championships	Nationals	Senior	All	Chengde, Hebei Province	
November 30 – December 1	Lithuanian Championships	Nationals	All	M/W	Kaunas, Lithuania	
December 6–8	Danish Championships	Nationals	All	M/W/D	Hørsholm, Denmark	
December 6–8	Norwegian Championships	Nationals	All	M/W	Oslo, Norway	
December 7–8	Latvian Championships	Nationals	M/W	M/W	Riga, Latvia	
December 10–15	Romanian Junior Championships	Nationals	Junior	M/W	Otopeni, Romania	
December 11–12	Israeli Championships	Nationals	All	M/W/D	Holon, Israel	
December 11–15	Austrian Championships	Nationals	All	All	Dornbirn, Austria	
December 12–15	Spanish Championships	Nationals	All	All	Logroño, Spain	
December 12–15	Swedish Championships	Nationals	All	All	Västerås, Sweden	
December 13–14	Four Nationals Championships	Nationals	S/J	All	Cieszyn, Poland	
December 13–15	Swiss Championships	Nationals	All	All	Geneva, Switzerland	
December 13–15	Finnish Championships	Nationals	S/J	All	Rauma, Finland	
December 13–16	Kazakh Championships	Nationals	S/J	M/W/D	Karaganda, Kazakhstan	
December 14–15	Estonian Championships	Nationals	Senior	M/W	Tallinn, Estonia	
December 14–15	Peruvian Championships	Nationals	Junior	W	Lima, Peru	
December 16–21	German Championships	Nationals	All	All	Oberstdorf, Germany	
December 18–19	Armenian Championships	Nationals	All	M/W/D	Yerevan, Armenia	
December 18–23	Russian Championships	Nationals	Senior	All	Omsk, Russia	
December 19–21	Italian Championships	Nationals	S/J	All	Varese, Italy	
December 19–22	Bulgarian Championships	Nationals	All	M/W	Sofia, Bulgaria	
December 19–22	Turkish Championships	Nationals	All	M/W	Ankara, Turkey	
December 19–23	Japan Championships	Nationals	Senior	All	Kadoma, Japan	
December 20–21	French Championships	Nationals	Senior	All	Annecy, France	
December 20–21	Estonian Junior Championships	Nationals	J/N	All	Tondiraba, Estonia	
December 21–22	Croatian Championships	Nationals	All	M/W	Zagreb, Croatia	
January 2–5	South Korean Championships	Nationals	S/J	M/W/D	Uijeongbu, South Korea	
January 14–19	Canadian Championships	Nationals	S/J	All	Laval, Quebec, Canada	
January 17–18	Belarusian Championships	Nationals	Senior	M/W/D	Minsk, Belarus	
January 17–18	Belgian Championships	Nationals	All	All	Hasselt, Belgium	
January 18–19	Polish Junior Championships	Nationals	Junior	All	Krynica-Zdrój, Poland	
January 20–26	U.S. Championships	Nationals	S/J	All	Wichita, Kansas, United States	
January 27–28	Hungarian Junior Championships	Nationals	J/N	M/W/D	Budapest, Hungary	
January 30 - February 2	Belarusian Junior Championships	Nationals	Junior	M/W/D	Minsk, Belarus	
January 31 – February 2	Czech Junior Championships	Nationals	J/N	M/W/D	Mariánské Lázně, Czech Republic	
January 31 – February 2	French Junior Championships	Nationals	Junior	All	Villard-de-Lans, France	
February 5–9	Russian Junior Championships	Nationals	Junior	All	Saransk, Russia	
February 13–16	Dutch Championships	Nationals	All	All	Tilburg, Netherlands	
February 22	Egyptian Championships	Nationals	Novice	W	Bergamo, Italy	
February 22	Greek Championships	Nationals	All	M/W	Bergamo, Italy	
February 22	Moroccan Championships	Nationals	All	W	Bergamo, Italy	
February 15–16	Slovak Junior Championships	Nationals	J/N	M/W/D	Prešov, Slovakia	
February 28 – March 1	North Macedonian Championships	Nationals	J/N	W	Skopje, North Macedonia	
March 14–16	Luxembourg Championships	Nationals	Junior	W	Kockelscheuer, Luxembourg	
March 19–22	Ukrainian Junior Championships	Nationals	Junior	All	Bohuslav, Ukraine	
March 21-23	Liechtensteiner Championships	Nationals	Junior	W	Flims, Switzerland	
April 10-12	Ukrainian Championships	Nationals	S/N	M/W/P	Bohuslav, Ukraine	
April 9-12	Thai Championships	Nationals	J/N	M/W	Bangkok, Thailand	
April 26	Kuwait Championships	Nationals	J/N	W	Bayan, Kuwait	
May 3	Andorran Championships	Nationals	J/N	M	Canillo, Andorra	
May 4-6	South African Championships	Nationals	J/N	M/W	Forest Hill, South Africa	
June 3-4	Hong Kong Championships	Nationals	All	M/W	Kowloon, Hong Kong	
June 7-8	Irish Championships	Nationals	S/N	M/W/D	Dundee, Scotland, United Kingdom	

== Senior medalists ==
=== Men's singles ===
Championships	Gold	Silver	Bronze	Ref.
Armenia	Semen Daniliants	No other competitors		
Australia	Darian Kaptich	Julio Potapenko	Douglas Gerber	
Austria	Maurizio Zandron	Valentin Eisenbauer	Anton Skoficz	
Belarus	Evgenji Puzanov	Vasilij Borohovskij	Georgij Kozlovskij	
Brazil	Arthur dos Santos Alcorte	No other competitors		
Bulgaria	Alexander Zlatkov	Beat Schümperli	Filip Kaymakchiev	
Canada	Roman Sadovsky	Anthony Paradis	David Li	
China	Chen Yudong	Dai Daiwei	Peng Zhiming	
Chinese Taipei	Li Yu-Hsiang	Yeh Che Yu	No other competitors	
Croatia	Jari Kessler	No other competitors		
Czech Republic	Georgii Reshtenko	Filip Ščerba	Petr Kotlařík	
Estonia	Mihhail Selevko	Aleksandr Selevko	Arlet Levandi	
Finland	Valtter Virtanen	Arttu Juusola	Jan Ollikainen	
France	Kévin Aymoz	François Pitot	Luc Economides	
Germany	Nikita Starostin	Luca Fünfer	Kai Jagoda	
(United Kingdom) Great Britain	Edward Appleby	Freddie Leggott	Tao MacRae	
Hong Kong	Jarvis Ho	Lap Kan Lincoln Yuen	Chiu Hei Cheung	
Hungary	Aleksandr Vlasenko	Aleksei Vlasenko	No other competitors	
India	Priyam Tated	Vishal Arnand Mutyala	Manit Singh	
(Republic of Ireland) Ireland	Dillon Judge	No other competitors		
Israel	Lev Vinokur	Mark Gorodnitsky	No other competitors	
Italy	Daniel Grassl	Nikolaj Memola	Gabriele Frangipani	
Japan	Yuma Kagiyama	Rio Nakata	Tatsuya Tsuboi	
Kazakhstan	Dias Jirenbayev	Nikita Krivosheev	Artur Smagulov	
Latvia	Deniss Vasiļjevs	Fedir Kulish	No other competitors	
Lithuania	Daniel Korabelnik	No other competitors		
Mexico	Donovan Carrillo	No other competitors		
Philippines	Paolo Borromeo	No other competitors		
Poland	Vladimir Samoilov	Kornel Witkowski	Jakub Lofek	
Russia	Vladislav Dikidzhi	Gleb Lutfullin	Evgeni Semenenko	
Serbia	Danial Ibragimov	No other competitors		
Slovakia	Adam Hagara	Lukáš Václavík	No other competitors	
South Korea	Cha Jun-hwan	Seo Min-kyu	Lee Si-hyeong	
Spain	Tomàs-Llorenç Guarino Sabaté	Adrián Jiménez de Baldomero	Euken Alberdi	
Sweden	Casper Johansson	Andreas Nordebäck	Gabriel Folkesson	
Switzerland	Lukas Britschgi	Noah Bodenstein	Nico Steffen	
Turkey	Alp Eren Özkan	Başar Oktar	Burak Demirboğa	
Ukraine	Kyrylo Marsak	Serhiy Sokolov	No other competitors	
United States	Ilia Malinin	Andrew Torgashev	Camden Pulkinen	

=== Women's singles ===
Championships	Gold	Silver	Bronze	Ref.
Argentina	Sophia Dayan	Michelle Di Cicco	No other competitors	
Armenia	Rubina Simonyan	Anna Smbatyan	No other competitors	
Australia	Hana Bath	Maria Chernyshova	Sienna Kaczmarczyk	
Austria	Olga Mikutina	Flora Marie Schaller	Emily Saari	
Belarus	Viktoriia Safonova	Elizaveta Pikulik	Elizaveta Kostyuk	
Belgium	Nina Pinzarrone	Danielle Verbinnen	Shadé de Brauwer	
Brazil	Deborah Caroline Vale Bell	No other competitors		
Bulgaria	Alexandra Feigin	Kristina Grigorova	Galena Todorova	
Canada	Madeline Schizas	Sara-Maude Dupuis	Katherine Medland Spence	
China	Jin Shuxian	Gao Shiqi	Wang Yihan	
Chinese Taipei	Amanda Hsu	Mya Poe	No other competitors	
Croatia	Hana Cvijanović	Lorena Čižmek	Luce Stipaničev	
Czech Republic	Michaela Vrašťáková	Eliška Březinová	Barbora Vranková	
Denmark	Anna-Flora Colmor Jepsen	Annika Skibby	Nicole Jensen	
Estonia	Niina Petrõkina	Elina Goidina	Maria Eliise Kaljuvere	
Finland	Olivia Lisko	Linnea Ceder	Janna Jyrkinen	
France	Stefania Gladki	Léa Serna	Eve Dubecq	
Germany	Kristina Isaev	Sarah Pesch	Anna Grekul	
(United Kingdom) Great Britain	Kristen Spours	Nina Povey	Saskia Zainchkovskaya	
Greece	Dimitra Korri	No other competitors		
Hong Kong	Tsz Ching Chan	Joanna So	Megan Wong	
Hungary	Vivien Papp	Regina Schermann	No other competitors	
Iceland	Lena Rut Ásgeirsdóttir	No other competitors		
India	Tara Prasad	Chelsi Singh	Kashish Sharma	
Indonesia	Michelle Edgina Axille	Kelly Elizabeth Supangat	Tasya Putri	
Israel	Mariia Seniuk	Julia Fennel	No other competitors	
Italy	Anna Pezzetta	Lara Naki Gutmann	Marina Piredda	
Japan	Kaori Sakamoto	Mao Shimada	Wakaba Higuchi	
Kazakhstan	Sofia Samodelkina	Zere Sarbalina	Sofiya Farafonova	
Latvia	Anastasija Konga	Sofja Stepčenko	Emilija Ozola	
Lithuania	Meda Variakojytė	Jogailė Aglinskytė	No other competitors	
Mexico	Andrea Astrain Maynez	Andrea Montesinos Cantú	Eugenia Garza	
Morocco	Lina Hammou Ahabchane	No other competitors		
Netherlands	Niki Wories	Saskia Oudejans	Jolanda Vos	
New Zealand	Petra Lahti	Mirika Armstrong	Cordelia Shi	
Norway	Mia Risa Gomez	Linnea Kilsand	Oda Havgar	
Philippines	Maxine Marie Bautista	Cathryn Limketkai	Sofia Frank	
Poland	Ekaterina Kurakova	Laura Szczęsna	Karolina Białas	
Romania	Julia Sauter	Ana-Sofia Beschea	Teodora Maria Gheorghe	
Russia	Adeliia Petrosian	Daria Sadkova	Alina Gorbacheva	
Serbia	Mariia Kryzhova	No other competitors		
Slovakia	Vanesa Šelmeková	Ema Doboszová	Terézia Pócsová	
South Africa	Gian-Quen Isaacs	No other competitors		
South Korea	Kim Chae-yeon	Shin Ji-a	Kim Yu-jae	
Spain	Nuria Rodríguez Serrano	Celia Garnacho Cabanillas	Lucía Ruiz Manzano	
Sweden	Josefin Taljegård	Julia Brovall	Olivia Philips	
Switzerland	Kimmy Repond	Livia Kaiser	Ophélie Clerc	
Turkey	Ceren Karaş	Yağmur Derin Kevinç	Ceyda Sağlam	
Ukraine	Sofia Grigorenko	Taisiia Spesivtseva	Elyzaveta Babenko	
United States	Amber Glenn	Alysa Liu	Sarah Everhardt	

=== Pairs ===
Championships	Gold	Silver	Bronze	Ref.
Austria	Sophia Schaller; Livio Mayr	Gabriella Izzo; Luc Maierhofer	No other competitors	
China	Zhang Jiaxuan; Huang Yihang	Zhang Xuanqi; Feng Wenqiang	Guo Rui; Zhang Yiwen	
Finland	Milania Väänänen; Filippo Clerici	No other competitors		
France	Camille Kovalev; Pavel Kovalev	Aurélie Faula; Théo Belle	Louise Ehrhard; Matthis Pellegris	
(United Kingdom) Great Britain	Anastasia Vaipan-Law; Luke Digby	No other competitors		
Canada	Deanna Stellato-Dudek; Maxime Deschamps	Lia Pereira; Trennt Michaud	Kelly Ann Laurin; Loucas Éthier	
Iceland	Júlía Sylvía Gunnarsdóttir; Manuel Piazza	No other competitors		
Italy	Sara Conti; Niccolò Macii	Rebecca Ghilardi; Filippo Ambrosini	Irma Caldara; Riccardo Maglio	
Japan	Riku Miura; Ryuichi Kihara	Yuna Nagaoka; Sumitada Moriguchi	Sae Shimizu; Lucas Tsuyoshi Honda	
Netherlands	Daria Danilova; Michel Tsiba	No other competitors		
Poland	Ioulia Chtchetinina; Michał Woźniak	No other competitors		
Russia	Anastasia Mishina; Aleksandr Galliamov	Aleksandra Boikova; Dmitrii Kozlovskii	Natalia Khabibullina; Ilya Knyazhuk	
Spain	Brooke McIntosh; Marco Zandron	No other competitors		
Sweden	Greta Crafoord; John Crafoord	No other competitors		
Switzerland	Oxana Vouillamoz; Tom Bouvart	No other competitors		
United States	Alisa Efimova; Misha Mitrofanov	Katie McBeath; Daniil Parkman	Ellie Kam; Danny O'Shea	

=== Ice dance ===
Championships	Gold	Silver	Bronze	Ref.
Armenia	Kristina Dobroserdova; Alessandro Pellegrini	No other competitors		
Australia	Holly Harris; Jason Chan	Romy Malcolm; Kobi Chant	Samantha Udell; Zach Churton	
Austria	Corinna Huber; Patrick Huber	No other competitors		
Belarus	Ekaterina Andreeva; Dmitrij Blinov	Natal'ya Pozhivilko; Svyatoslav Verstakov	Alina Derkach; Andrej Petrukovich	
Canada	Piper Gilles; Paul Poirier	Marjorie Lajoie; Zachary Lagha	Alicia Fabbri; Paul Ayer	
China	Ren Junfei; Xing Jianing	Xiao Zixi; He Linghao	Lin Yufei; Gao Zijian	
Czech Republic	Natálie Taschlerová; Filip Taschler	Kateřina Mrázková; Daniel Mrázek	No other competitors	
Denmark	Elisabetta Incardona; Rafael Marc Drozd Musil	No other competitors		
Finland	Juulia Turkkila; Matthias Versluis	Yuka Orihara; Juho Pirinen	Daniela Ivanitskiy; Matthew Sperry	
France	Evgeniia Lopareva; Geoffrey Brissaud	Loïcia Demougeot; Théo le Mercier	Natacha Lagouge; Arnaud Caffa	
Germany	Jennifer Janse van Rensburg; Benjamin Steffan	Charise Matthaei; Max Liebers	Karla Maria Karl; Kai Hoferichter	
(United Kingdom) Great Britain	Lilah Fear; Lewis Gibson	Phebe Bekker; James Hernandez	Sophia Bushell; Antonio Peña	
Hungary	Mariia Ignateva; Danijil Szemko	Lucy Hancock; Ilias Fourati	Emese Csiszèr; Mark Shapiro	
(Republic of Ireland) Ireland	Carolane Soucisse; Shane Firus	No other competitors		
Israel	Elizabeth Tkachenko; Alexei Kiliakov	Shira Ichilov; Dmitry Kravchenko	No other competitors	
Italy	Charlène Guignard; Marco Fabbri	Victoria Manni; Carlo Röthlisberger	Leia Dozzi; Pietro Papetti	
Japan	Utana Yoshida; Masaya Morita	Azusa Tanaka; Shingo Nishiyama	Ayano Sasaki; Yoshimitsu Ikeda	
Mexico	Ava Aversano Martines; Christian Bennett	Harlow Stanley; Seiji Urano	No other competitors	
Netherlands	Hanna Jakucs; Alessio Galli	Chelsea Verhaegh; Sherim van Geffen	No other competitors	
Poland	Sofiia Dovhal; Wiktor Kulesza	Anastasia Polibina; Pavel Golovishnikov	No other competitors	
Russia	Alexandra Stepanova; Ivan Bukin	Elizaveta Khudaiberdieva; Egor Bazin	Irina Khavronina; Devid Naryzhnyy	
Slovakia	Mária Sofia Pucherová; Nikita Lysak	No other competitors		
South Korea	Hannah Lim; Ye Quan	No other competitors		
Spain	Olivia Smart; Tim Dieck	Sofía Val; Asaf Kazimov	Philomène Sabourin; Raul Bermejo	
Sweden	Milla Ruud Reitan; Nikolaj Majorov	Emma Kivioja; Erik Pellnor	No other competitors	
Switzerland	Gina Zehnder; Beda Leon Sieber	Arianna Sassi; Luca Morini	No other competitors	
United States	Madison Chock; Evan Bates	Christina Carreira; Anthony Ponomarenko	Caroline Green; Michael Parsons	

== Junior medalists ==
=== Men's singles ===
Championships	Gold	Silver	Bronze	Ref.
Andorra	Raul Garcia Shibinskaya	No other competitors		
Armenia	Mikayel Salazaryan	Konstantin Smirnov	Mark Hakobyan	
Australia	Vinceman Chong	James Lin	Rahul Ravindran	
Austria	Tobia Oellerer	Maksym Petrychenko	Daniel Ruis	
Belarus	Vasilij Borohovskij	Georgij Kozlovskij	Pavel Gavdis	
Belgium	Denis Kroglov	Dimitri Christakis	Leander Gabriel	
Brazil	Lucaz Filipe Trindade Candria	Diogo Vinicius Peixer da Costa	No other competitors	
Bulgaria	Dean Mihaylov	Rosen Peev	Kalojan Nalbantov	
Canada	David Bondar	Edward Nicholas Vasii	David Howes	
China	Zhao Qihan	Li Yingrui	Wang Zexin	
Chinese Taipei	Wu Bo-Shun	No other competitors		
Croatia	Petar Miklenić	Fran Petrović	No other competitors	
Czech Republic	Jakub Tykal	Tadeas Vaclavik	Marian Klus	
Denmark	Wendell Hansson-Østergaard	Dimitri Steffensen	Sigurd Weldingh	
Estonia	Arlet Levandi	Vadislav Churakov	Jegor Martsenko	
Finland	Matias Heinonen	Benjamin Eriksson	Anton Erkama	
France	Gianni Motilla	Ilia Gogitidze	Jean Medard	
Germany	Genrikh Gartung	Robert Wildt	Hugo Willi Herrmann	
(United Kingdom) Great Britain	Edward Solovyov	Lloyd Thomson	Jack Donovan	
Hong Kong	Jarvis Ho	Jiarui Li	Simon Sun	
Hungary	Aleksei Vlasenko	Benedek Pal Dozsa	Kolos Rác	
India	Manjesh Tiwari	Jatin Sherawat	Simar K Bajaj	
Indonesia	Rafif Gerfianto Putra	Betrand Zeusef Zuriel	No other competitors	
Israel	Tamir Kuperman	Kirill Sheiko	Nikita Sheiko	
Japan	Rio Nakata	Sena Takahashi	Taiga Nishino	
Kazakhstan	Temirlan Yakiyaev	Nikita Kozlov	Ansar Ismukhambetov	
Latvia	Jānis Znotiņš	Kirills Korkačs	Ratmirs Bekisbajevs	
Lithuania	Luka Imedashvili	No other competitors		
Mexico	Leonardo Emilio Mariscal Pacheco	No other competitors		
Norway	Daniil Valanov	No other competitors		
New Zealand	Dwayne Li	Stepan Kadlcik	No other competitors	
Philippines	Brandon Baldoz	No other competitors		
Romania	Razvan Cionac	Bálint Domahidi-Dóczy	No other competitors	
Russia	Lev Lazarev	Arseniy Fedotov	Makar Solodnikov	
Slovakia	Alex Valky	Jozef Curma	Jakub Curma	
South Africa	Cody Kock	No other competitors		
South Korea	Lee Yun-ho	Aaron Kim	Kim Tae-hwan	
Spain	André Zapata Casares	Raül Garcia Shibinskaya	Daniel Rouco Morcillo	
Sweden	Hugo Bostedt	Elias Sayed	Albin Samuelsson	
Switzerland	Ean Weiler	Sandro de Angelo	Tammaro Wyss	
Thailand	Tharon Warasittichai	Kittikorn Kijsanapitak	No other competitors	
Turkey	Furkan Emre İncel	Efe Ergin Dınçer	Atilla Arda Şahinolanlar	
Ukraine	Egor Kurtsev	Fedir Babenko	Lev Myshkovets	
United States	Lorenzo Elano	Aleksandr Fegan	Patrick Blackwell	

=== Women's singles ===
Championships	Gold	Silver	Bronze	Ref.
Argentina	Stefanía Soloveva	Lilia Vlasenko	No other competitors	
Armenia	Sofia Titova	Izabella Esaian	Mariia Arutunian	
Australia	Hana Bath	Mia Zixuan Zeng	Kalyn Shimogaki	
Austria	Sara Höfer	Maxima Rebernig	Alisah Reiterer	
Belarus	Alisa Gorislavskaya	Elizaveta Pikulik	Varvara Stahovich	
Belgium	Lilou Remeysen	Ilona van Steenberghe	Charlotte Jennes	
Brazil	Maria Reikdal	Beatriz Rodrigues Dolbeth Costa	No other competitors	
Bulgaria	Lia Lyubenova	Chiara Hristova	Krista Georgieva	
Canada	Lia Cho	Ksenia Krouzkevitch	Sandrine Blais	
China	Jin Shuxian	Wang Yihan	Gao Shiqi	
Chinese Taipei	Tsai Yu-Feng	Chloe Tang	Lee Fang-Ning	
Croatia	Lena Čusak	Klara Čusak	Meri Marinac	
Czech Republic	Jana Horcickova	Barbora Tykalova	Michaela Malkova	
Denmark	Camilla Poulsen	Emilia Borch	Fie Magnussen	
Estonia	Elina Goidina	Maria Eliise Jakjuvere	Elizabeth Nõu	
Finland	Iida Karhunen	Venla Sinisalo	Annika Pellonmaa	
France	Eve Dubecq	Lily-Rose Laguerre	Louane Wolff	
Germany	Anna Gerke	Julia Grabowski	Ina Jungmann	
(United Kingdom) Great Britain	Leilah Patten	Arina Vorobeva	Alice Smith	
Greece	Sofia Lamprinou	Markella Zikou	Despoina Gonidaki	
Hong Kong	Ariel Guo	Yeuk Kwan Zhu	Yuan Xue	
Hungary	Polina Dzsumanyijazova	Lena Ekker	Zsófia Stéplaki	
Iceland	Sædís Heba Guðmundsdóttir	Dharma Elísabet Tómasdóttir	No other competitors	
India	Harshita Rawtani	Aanya Singh	Gauri Rai	
Indonesia	Chilly Ann Sintana Wongso	Safia Nurdeta Aulia Andiko	Nathania Kinarizzah Insyirah	
(Republic of Ireland) Ireland	Julianna Farrell	Eeva O'Brien	No other competitors	
Israel	Sophia Shifrin	Simona Tkachman	Gabriella Grinberg	
Japan	Mao Shimada	Kaoruko Wada	Ikura Kushida	
Kazakhstan	Veronika Kim	Anna Sannikova	Karina Sheina	
Kuwait	Sama Jeraq	No other competitors		
Latvia	Kira Baranovska	Nataša Jermoļicka	Ksenija Heimane	
Liechtenstein	Salome Schmid	No other competitors		
Lithuania	Gabriele Juskaite	Milana Siniavskyte	Ema Komičiūtė	
Luxembourg	Dita Giltaire	Eliska Philippe	No other competitors	
Mexico	Catetena Gonzalez Ryabchikova	Maria Velazquez Toscano	Regina Llado Fernandez del Campo	
Morocco	Dana Syrine Crausaz	No other competitors		
Netherlands	Lucca Dijkhuizen	Kahlan Gooijer	Noa Fay Cappenberg	
North Macedonia	Isidora Isjanovski	Monika Makarovska	No other competitors	
Norway	Pernille With	Therese Håvåg	Celin Ellingsen	
New Zealand	Renee Tsai	Cara Tang	Miksaki Joe	
Peru	Mora Briceño Rantica	No other competitors		
Philippines	Lillianna Fish	Isabella Miel Hazelton	Samantha Mascarinas	
Romania	Natalia Runcanu	Ana Stratulat	Adria Liliac	
Russia	Elena Kostyleva	Alisa Dvoeglazova	Sofia Dzepka	
Serbia	Ekaterina Balaganskaia	Dunja Tresnjic	Ana Scepanovic	
Slovakia	Olivia Lengyelova	Alica Lengyelova	Emma Maria Cerkalova	
South Africa	Jasmine Coetzee	Ella Hawkes	Haley-Rae Thomson	
South Korea	Lee Gyu-ri	Lee Hyo-won	Kim Min-song	
Spain	Noa Seguí Jiménez	Carlota García Barranco	Ariadna Gupta Espada	
Sweden	Lilly Almgren-Lidman	Alexandra Ödman	Alice Westling	
Switzerland	Leandra Tzimpoukakis	Anastasia Brandenburg	Elisabeth Dibbern	
Thailand	Pasuree Marcella Tatirat	Pimmpida Lerdpraiwan	Chiranat Chinpakron	
Turkey	Azra Sağlam	Zeynep Naz Doğan	Selin Akbulut	
Ukraine	Sofiia Rymshyna	Oleksandra Delyamure	Sofiia Hryhorenko	
United States	Sophie Joline von Felten	Skylar Lautowa-Peguero	Jessica Jurka	

=== Pairs ===
Championships	Gold	Silver	Bronze	Ref.
Austria	Paola Jurisic / Michail Savenkov	No other competitors		
Canada	Ava Kemp / Yohnatan Elizarov	Martina Ariano-Kent / Charly Laliberté-Laurent	Julia Quattrochi / Simon Desmarais	
China	Guo Rui / Zhang Yiwen	Chen Meizhuyu / Wang Zhiyu	No other competitors	
Czech Republic	Johanka Žilková / Matyáš Becerra	Alžběta Kvíderová / Jindřich Klement	No other competitors	
France	Romane Telemaque / Lucas Coulon	Clelia Liget-Latus / Allan Daniel Fisher	No other competitors	
Germany	Aliyah Ackermann / Tobija Harms	Sonja Löwenherz / Robert Löwenherz	No other competitors	
(United Kingdom) Great Britain	Zarah Wood / Alex Lapsky	Sophie Dracas / Pelham Wright	No other competitors	
Italy	Irina Napolitano / Edoardo Comi	Polina Polman / Gabriel Renoldi	Melissa Merrone / Alberto Tommasi	
Japan	Sae Shimizu / Lucas Tsuyoshi Honda	No other competitors		
Russia	Polina Shesheleva / Egor Karnaukov	Taisiya Shcherbinina / Artem Petrov	Zoya Kovyazina / Artemiy Mokhov	
Slovakia	Laura Hečková / Alex Valky	No other competitors		
Spain	Claudia Scotti / Noah Quesada	Megan Yudin / Patricio Romano Rossi	Inés Moudden / Alejandro Lázaro García	
Switzerland	Chiara Michaela Pazienza / Maxim Knorr	Zoë Pflaum / Linus Mager	No other competitors	
Ukraine	Kira Shutko / Vadym Galyareta	No other competitors		
United States	Reagan Moss / Jakub Galbavy	Olivia Flores / Luke Wang	Saya Carpenter / Jon Maravilla	

=== Ice dance ===
Championships	Gold	Silver	Bronze	Ref.
Australia	Renee Yuen / Oliver Ma	Chanelle Chum / Osckar Chum	No other competitors	
Austria	Anita Straub / Andreas Straub	No other competitors		
Belarus	Viktoriya Plaskonnaya / Vladislav Sytsik	Karolina Krasovskaya / Egor Tratsevskij	Varvara Ravgen / Mihail Prusenkov	
Canada	Chloe Nguyen / Brendan Giang	Sandrine Gauthier / Quentin Thieren	Layla Veillon / Alexander Brandys	
China	Yin Shanjie / Yang Shirui	Yu Xinyi / Liu Tianyi	Meng Lingxuan / Chen Lang	
Chinese Taipei	Tasha Shin Hui Lai / Kazuteru Mikki Becker-Pos	No other competitors		
Czech Republic	Eliška Žáková / Filip Mencl	Natálie Blaasová / Filip Blaas	Diane Sznajder / Jachym Novak	
Estonia	Ksenia Šipunova / Miron Korjagin	Arina Beljajeva / Frederick Merilo	No other competitors	
Finland	Hilda Taylor / Alexander Buchholdt	Enna Kesti / Oskari Liedenpohja	Cilla Laine / Urho Reina	
France	Celina Fradji / Jean-hans Fourneaux	Ambre Perrier Gianesini / Samuel Blanc Klaperman	Dania Mouaden / Theo Bigot	
Germany	Darya Grimm / Michail Savitskiy	Alexia Kruk / Jan Eisenhaber	Lilia Schubert / Nikita Remeshevskiy	
(United Kingdom) Great Britain	Mimi Marler Davies / Joseph Black	Molly Hairsine / Alessio Surenkov-Gultchev	Kiah Whieldon / Jamie Hammond	
Hungary	Villo Mira Szilagyi / Istvan Jaracs	No other competitors		
Italy	Noemi Tali / Noah Lafornara	Laura Finelli / Massimiliano Bucciarelli	Vittoria Petracchi / Daniel Basile	
Japan	Sara Kishimoto / Atsuhiko Tamura	Sumire Yoshida / Ibuki Ogahara	Kaho Yamashita / Yuto Nagata	
Russia	Vasilisa Grigoreva / Evgeniy Artyushchenko	Elizaveta Maleina / Matvei Samokhin	Zoya Pestova / Sergei Lagutov	
Slovakia	Aneta Václavíková / Ivan Morozov	Lucia Štefanovova / Jacopo Boeris	No other competitors	
Spain	Sara Marcilly Vázquez / Jolan Engel	Sofía Pascual Mateos / Sergio Parra Almonacid	Lara Sundberg / Héctor González Elvira	
Sweden	Anna Mackenzie / Wesley Lockwood	Charlotte Chung / Axel Mackenzie	No other competitors	
Switzerland	Seraina Tscharner / Laurin Wiederkehr	Alexandra Lévy / Alan Llorente	No other competitors	
Ukraine	Tetyana Belodonova; Ivan Kachur	Polina Kapustina; Mykhailo Kliuev	Sofia Rekunova; Denis Fedyankin	
United States	Hana Maria Aboian / Daniil Veselukhin	Elliana Peal / Ethan Peal	Caroline Mullen / Brendan Mullen	
