= Lydia Smart =

English figure skater (born 1998)

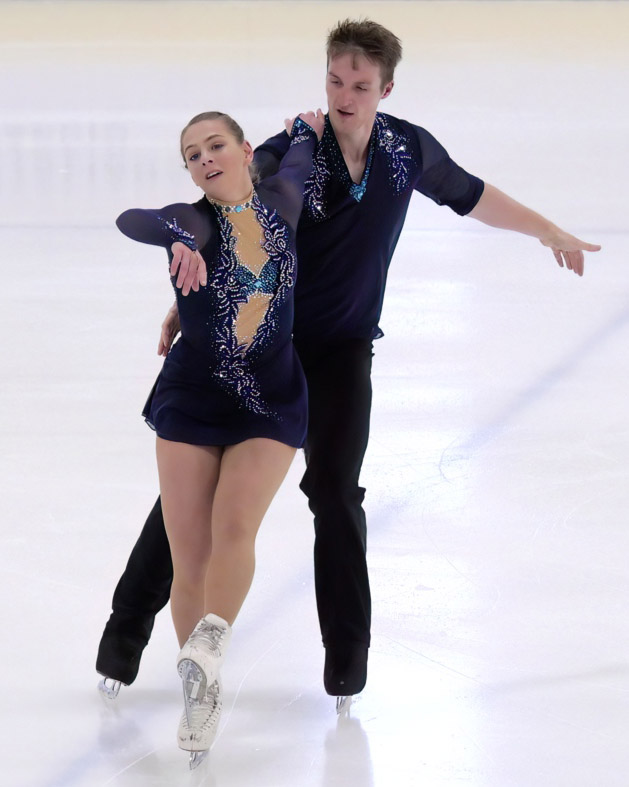
- Lydia Smart and Harry Mattick at the 2022 Lombardia Trophy

Personal information
- Born: 16 July 1998 (age 27) Blackpool, England, United Kingdom
- Home town: Swindon, England
- Height: 1.52 m (5 ft 0 in)

Figure skating career
- Country: Great Britain
- Discipline: Pair skating (since 2021); Women's singles (2015–19)
- Partner: Harry Mattick (2021–25)
- Coach: Christopher Boyadji; Zoe Jones; Lloyd Jones

Medal record
British Championships
Silver medal – second place	2023 Sheffield	Pairs
Silver medal – second place	2024 Sheffield	Pairs
Bronze medal – third place	2022 Sheffield	Pairs

Lydia Smart (born 16 July 1998) is an English figure skater. With her skating partner Harry Mattick, she is the 2022 Britannia Cup champion, the 2023 British Championship silver medalist, and the 2022 British Championship bronze medalist.

== Career ==
=== Women's singles ===
Smart began learning to skate at the age of three with the goal of becoming an Olympic athlete. As well as skating lessons, she took on additional training including ballet, flexibility, and fitness. Smart competed in her first British Championship at the age of 12.

She was selected in 2012 to be part of the British International Development Squad by the National Ice Skating Association (now British Ice Skating).

In 2016, Smart was invited to train in Colorado Springs, Colorado in the United States. She trained overseas for a period of six months before returning to the United Kingdom.

=== Pair skating ===
From 2020 to 2025 Smart competed in pair skating with Harry Mattick. The pair trained at both the Oxford and Swindon rinks.

In 2022, Smart starred in the BBC Three documentary series Freeze along with Harry Mattick and fellow Swindon skater Kristen Spours.

=== Coaching ===
Smart is a British Ice Skating Level 2 qualified coach and teaches at the Oxford Ice Rink when not competing.

== Programs ==
=== Pair skating with Mattick ===
Season	Short program	Free skating
2022–2023	Moonlight Sonata by Ludwig van Beethoven; California Dreamin' performed by 33Tours choreo. by Lloyd Jones	Keeping Me Alive by Jonathan Roy choreo. by Lloyd Jones

== Competitive highlights ==
=== Pair skating with Mattick ===
- CS – Event of the ISU Challenger Series

Competition placements at senior level
Season	2021–22	2022–23	2023–24
World Championships		23rd	
European Championships			15th
CS Nebelhorn Trophy			14th
CS Warsaw Cup			4th
Bavarian Open		6th	6th
Britannia Cup		1st	
Challenge Cup	5th		
Ice Challenge		5th	
Lombardia Trophy		5th	
Tayside Trophy		5th	
Trophée Métropole Nice Côte d'Azur		5th	
British Championships	3rd	2nd	2nd

=== Women's singles ===
Competition placements at senior, junior & novice level
Season	2011–12	2012–13	2013–14	2015–16	2016–17	2017–18	2018–19
British Championships	29th N	16th N	21st N	15th J	5th J	16th J	10th S
