= Harry Mattick =

English figure skater (born 1993)

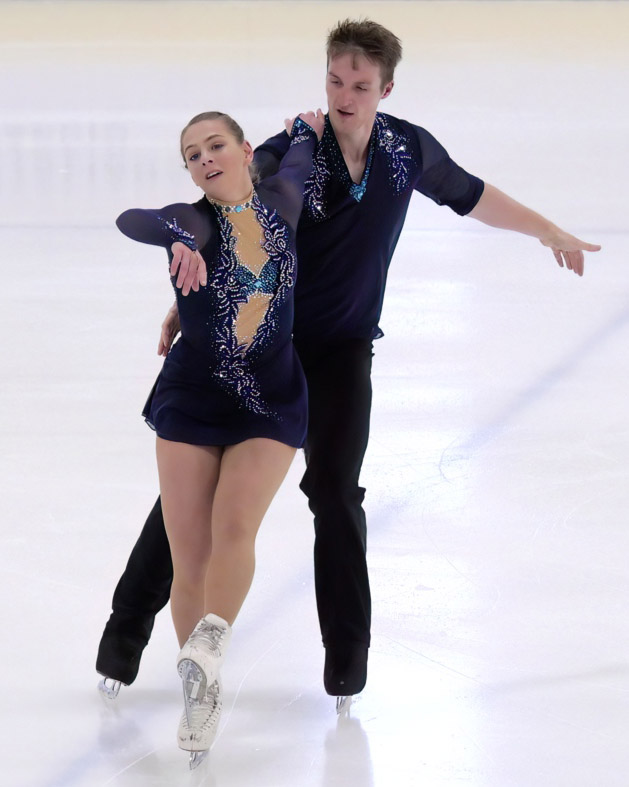
- Lydia Smart and Harry Mattick at the 2022 Lombardia Trophy

Personal information
- Born: 20 December 1993 (age 32) Bradford, England, United Kingdom
- Home town: Swindon, England
- Height: 1.79 m (5 ft 10 1/2 in)

Figure skating career
- Country: Great Britain
- Discipline: Pair skating (since 2021); Men's singles (2008–20)
- Partner: Zinia Wood (since 2025); Lydia Smart (2021–25)
- Coach: Christopher Boyadji; Zoe Jones; Lloyd Jones
- Skating club: Swindon
- Began skating: 2001

Medal record
British Championships
| Silver medal – second place | 2013 Sheffield | Singles |
| Silver medal – second place | 2022 Sheffield | Pairs |
| Bronze medal – third place | 2015 Sheffield | Singles |
| Bronze medal – third place | 2019 Sheffield | Singles |
| Bronze medal – third place | 2020 Sheffield | Singles |
| Bronze medal – third place | 2023 Sheffield | Pairs |
| Bronze medal – third place | 2024 Sheffield | Pairs |

Harry Mattick (born 20 December 1993) is an English figure skater. He is the 2017 Sofia Trophy champion, the 2020 Tayside Trophy bronze medalist, the 2012 British national silver medalist, and a three-time British national bronze medalist (2014, 2018, 2019).

On the junior level, he is the 2011 Warsaw Cup champion, the 2010 MNNT Cup bronze medalist, and a four-time British junior national champion (2008-2011).

Since the 2020-21 figure skating season, Mattick has competed in pairs discipline.

== Programs ==
=== With Smart ===
| Season | Short program | Free skating |
|---|---|---|
| 2022–2023 | Moonlight Sonata by Ludwig van Beethoven; California Dreamin' performed by 33Tours choreo. by Lloyd Jones | Keeping Me Alive by Jonathan Roy choreo. by Lloyd Jones |

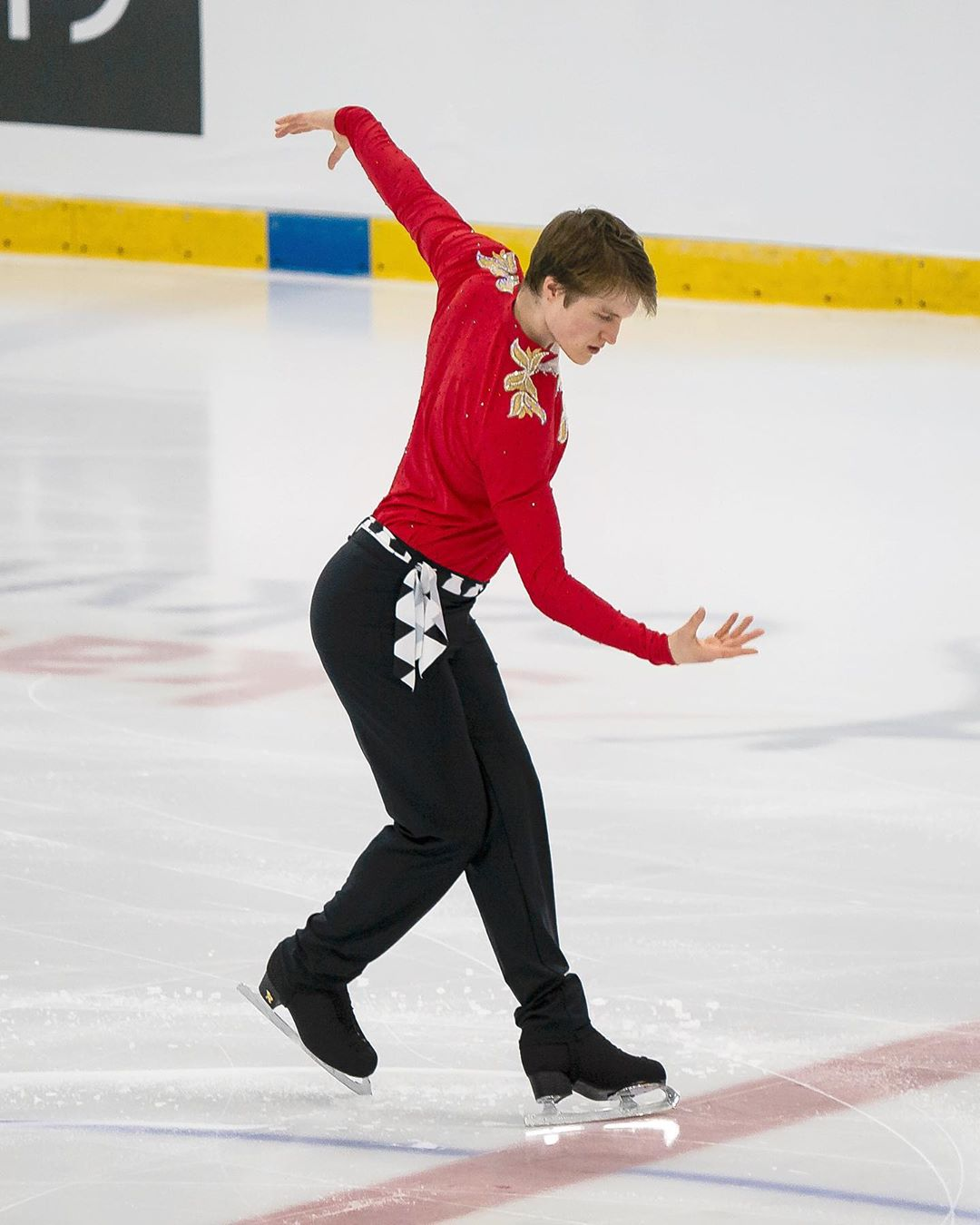
Mattick at the 2019 Autumn Classic International

=== Single Skating ===
| Season | Short program | Free skating |
|---|---|---|
| 2019–2020 | Bohemian Rhapsody by Freddie Mercury performed by Brooklyn Duo and Denver Quartet | Enter the Circus by Christina Aguilera; Waltz to the Death by The Miracle of Sound; The Joker by Danny Elfman |
| 2013–2014 | Latin selection | The Nightmare Before Christmas by Danny Elfman |
| 2012–2013 | Latin selection | The Professionals by Laurie Johnson |
| 2011–2012 | Rango by Hans Zimmer | Le Vent, Le Cri (from Le Professionnel) by Ennio Morricone; Cirque du Soleil |
| 2010–2011 | The Last Samurai by Hans Zimmer | I, Robot by Marco Beltrami |
| 2009–2010 | The Two Towers by Howard Shore | King Arthur Hans Zimmer |

== Competitive highlights ==
=== Pair skating with Lydia Smart ===
- CS – Event of the ISU Challenger Series

Competition placements at senior level
| Season | 2021–22 | 2022–23 | 2023-24 |
|---|---|---|---|
| World Championships | | 23rd | |
| European Championships | | | 15th |
| British Championships | 3rd | 2nd | 2nd |
| CS Nebelhorn Trophy | | | 14th |
| CS Warsaw Cup | | | 4th |
| Bavarian Open | | 6th | 6th |
| Britannia Cup | | 1st | |
| Challenge Cup | 5th | | |
| Ice Challenge | | 5th | |
| Lombardia Trophy | | 5th | |
| Tayside Trophy | | 5th | |
| Trophée Métropole Nice | | 5th | |

=== Singles skating ===
International
| Event | 08–09 | 09–10 | 10–11 | 11–12 | 12–13 | 13–14 | 14–15 | 16–17 | 17–18 | 18–19 | 19–20 |
|---|---|---|---|---|---|---|---|---|---|---|---|
| Europeans | | | | | 26th | | | | | | |
| CS Alpen Trophy | | | | | | | | | | 19th | |
| CS Autumn Classic | | | | | | | | 9th | 12th | 12th | 11th |
| CS Volvo Cup | | | | | | | 7th | | | | |
| CS Warsaw Cup | | | | | | | | | 11th | | |
| Bavarian Open | | | | | 15th | | | | | | |
| Crystal Skate | | | | | 5th | | | | | | |
| Cup of Nice | | | | | | | 13th | | 7th | | |
| Egna Spring Trophy | | | | | | 7th | | | | | |
| Hellmut Seibt | | | | | | | 7th | | | | |
| Int. Challenge Cup | | | | | 12th | 8th | 6th | 5th | 14th | 14th | 17th |
| NRW Trophy | | | | | 22nd | 13th | | | | | |
| Ondrej Nepela | | | | | 10th | | | | | | |
| Nordics | | | | | 5th | | | | | | |
| Sofia Trophy | | | | | | | | 1st | | | |
| Tayside Trophy | | | | | | | | | | | 3rd |
| Warsaw Cup | | | | | | 10th | | | | | |
International: Junior
| Junior Worlds | | 39th | 32nd | 19th | | | | | | | |
| JGP Belarus | | 13th | | | | | | | | | |
| JGP France | | | 11th | | | | | | | | |
| JGP Poland | | | | 11th | | | | | | | |
| JGP U.K. | | | 9th | | | | | | | | |
| EYOF | 11th | | | | | | | | | | |
| Toruń Cup | | 3rd | | | | | | | | | |
| Warsaw Cup | | | | 1st | | | | | | | |
National
| British Champ. | 1st J | 1st J | 1st J | 1st J | 2nd | 4th | 3rd | 4th | 4th | 3rd | 3rd |
