= Tondiraba =

Subdistrict of Tallinn, Estonia

Coordinates: 59.441257°N 24.859357°E

- Subdistrict of Tallinn
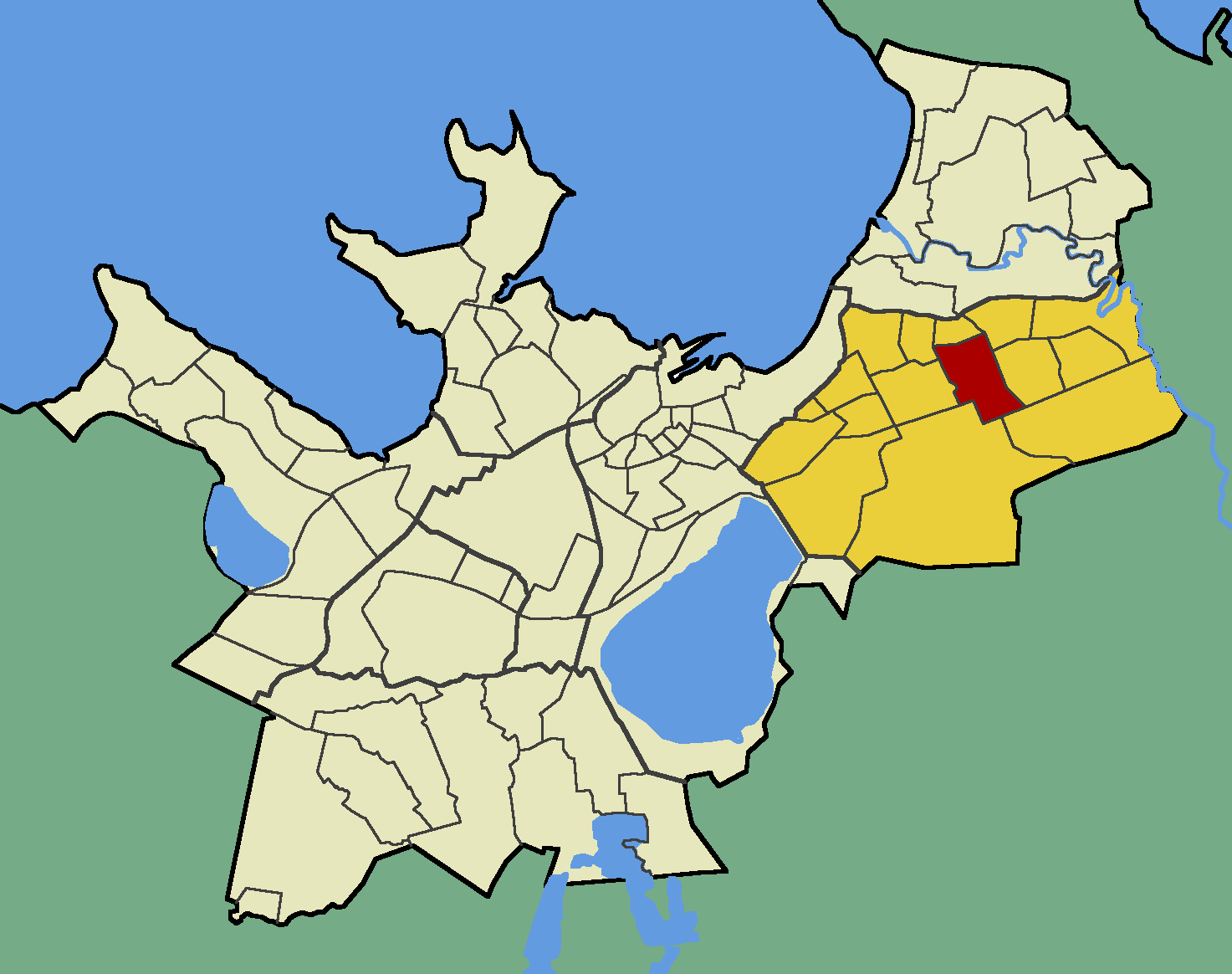
- Tondiraba within Lasnamäe District.
- Country: Estonia
- County: Harju County
- City: Tallinn
- District: Lasnamäe

Population (01.01.2015)
  - Total: 0

Tondiraba (Estonian for "Ghost Bog", although etymologically unrelated) is a subdistrict (Estonian: asum) in the district of Lasnamäe, Tallinn, the capital of Estonia. As of 1 January 2015, there are no residents living in the subdistrict.

== See also ==
- Tallinn Arena
