= Gabriel Folkesson =

Swedish figure skater (born 2002)

Personal information
- Born: 19 February 2002 (age 24) Trelleborg, Sweden
- Height: 1.81 m (5 ft 11 1/2 in)

Figure skating career
- Country: Sweden
- Discipline: Men's singles
- Coach: Tamara Kuchiki
- Skating club: Trelleborg Figure Skating Club
- Began skating: 2007

Medal record
Swedish Championships
Gold medal – first place	2024 Norrköping	Singles
Silver medal – second place	2022 Borlänge Falun	Singles
Bronze medal – third place	2023 Borås	Singles
Bronze medal – third place	2025 Västerås	Singles

Gabriel Folkesson (born 19 February 2002) is a Swedish figure skater. He is the 2024 Swedish National champion and a two-time Nordic Championship silver medalist.

== Personal life ==
Folkesson was born on 19 February 2002 in Trelleborg, Sweden. He began skating in 2007 and is a member of the Trelleborg Figure Skating Club.

== Career ==
=== 2023–24 season ===
As part of the 2023–24 ISU Challenger Series, Folkesson competed at the 2023 Warsaw Cup, where he finished in 7th place. He made his international championship debut at the 2024 European Championships, where he finished in 21st place.

== Competitive highlights ==
- JGP – Event of the ISU Junior Grand Prix Series
- CS – Event of the ISU Challenger Series

Competition placements at senior level
Season	2021–22	2022–23	2023–24	2024–25
European Championships			21st	
Swedish Championships	2nd	3rd	1st	3rd
CS Budapest Trophy		14th	16th	
CS Warsaw Cup		22nd	7th	
Challenge Cup			6th	
Nordic Championships		2nd	2nd	
Tallink Hotels Cup	3rd			
Winter University Games		16th		21st

Competition placements at junior level
Season	2016–17	2017–18	2018–19
World Junior Championships		22nd	
Swedish Championships	1st	1st	
JGP Belarus		8th	
JGP Italy		11th	
JGP Slovakia			15th
Cup of Nice	3rd		
Dragon Trophy		1st	
Ice Star	2nd		
Tallinn Trophy		4th	

== Detailed results ==
ISU personal best scores in the +5/-5 GOE System
Segment	Type	Score	Event
Total	TSS	205.79	2023 CS Warsaw Cup
Short program	TSS	78.44	2023 CS Warsaw Cup
Short program	TES	42.04	2023 CS Warsaw Cup
Short program	PCS	36.40	2023 CS Warsaw Cup
Free skating	TSS	127.35	2023 CS Warsaw Cup
Free skating	TES	58.58	2023 CS Warsaw Cup
Free skating	PCS	68.77	2023 CS Warsaw Cup

ISU personal best scores in the +3/-3 GOE System
Segment	Type	Score	Event
Total	TSS	166.39	2018 World Junior Championships
Short program	TSS	57.11	2018 World Junior Championships
Short program	TES	31.62	2018 World Junior Championships
Short program	PCS	25.49	2018 World Junior Championships
Free skating	TSS	110.01	2017 JGP Belarus
Free skating	TES	58.86	2017 JGP Italy
Free skating	PCS	54.08	2017 JGP Belarus

=== Senior level ===
Results in the 2021–22 season
Date	Event	SP		FS		Total	
Date	Event	P	Score	P	Score	P	Score
4–6 Mar 2022	(Estonia) 2022 Tallink Hotels Cup	3	65.39	3	121.28	3	186.67
7–10 Apr 2022	(Sweden) 2022 Swedish Championships	2	61.79	2	116.35	2	178.14

Results in the 2022–23 season
Date	Event	SP		FS		Total	
Date	Event	P	Score	P	Score	P	Score
13–16 Oct 2022	(Hungary) 2022 CS Budapest Trophy	14	54.74	15	106.56	14	161.30
17–20 Nov 2022	(Poland) 2022 CS Warsaw Cup	25	48.73	19	113.50	22	162.23
15–18 Dec 2022	(Sweden) 2023 Swedish Championships	4	59.67	3	124.58	3	184.25
12–16 Jan 2023	(United States) 2023 Winter World University Games	13	61.99	15	112.12	16	174.11
1–5 Feb 2023	(Iceland) 2023 Nordic Championships	3	62.77	2	128.00	2	190.77

Results in the 2023–24 season
Date	Event	SP		FS		Total	
Date	Event	P	Score	P	Score	P	Score
13–15 Oct 2023	(Hungary) 2023 CS Budapest Trophy	13	62.08	17	113.14	16	175.22
16–19 Nov 2023	(Poland) 2023 CS Warsaw Cup	5	78.44	13	127.35	7	205.79
14–16 Dec 2023	(Sweden) 2024 Swedish Championships	1	71.41	1	125.78	1	197.19
8–14 Jan 2024	(Lithuania) 2024 European Championships	17	70.71	21	120.96	21	191.67
1–4 Feb 2024	(Sweden) 2024 Nordic Championships	2	71.98	3	119.61	2	191.59
22–25 Feb 2024	(Netherlands) 2024 International Challenge Cup	5	75.34	6	130.37	6	205.71

Results in the 2024–25 season
Date	Event	SP		FS		Total	
Date	Event	P	Score	P	Score	P	Score
12–15 Dec 2024	(Sweden) 2025 Swedish Championships	3	61.09	2	130.16	3	191.25
16–18 Jan 2025	(Italy) 2025 Winter World University Games	14	64.24	21	105.13	21	169.37
