= Brazilian Figure Skating Championships =

- Status: Active
- Genre: National championships
- Frequency: Annual
- Country: Brazil
- Inaugurated: 2015
- Organizer: Brazilian Ice Sports Federation

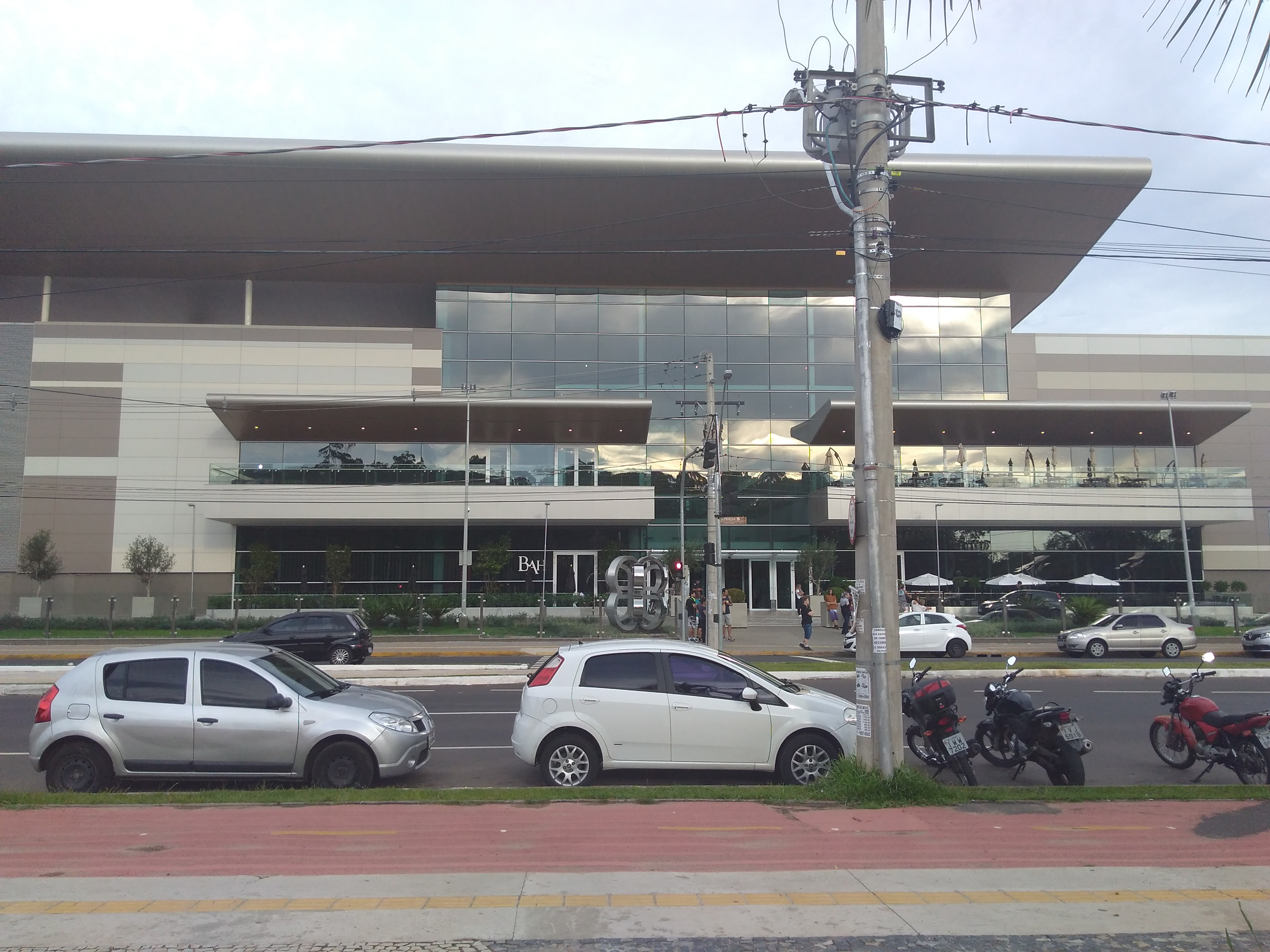
The 2019 Brazilian Championships were held at the ParkShopping Canoas, a shopping mall in Canoas.

The Brazilian Figure Skating Championships (Portuguese: Campeonato Brasileiro de Patinação Artística no Gelo) are an annual figure skating competition organized by the Brazilian Ice Sports Federation (Portuguese: Confederação Brasileira de Desportos no Gelo) to crown the national champions of Brazil. Competitive figure skating is relatively new to Brazil. The Brazilian Ice Sports Federation became a member of the International Skating Union (ISU) in 2006, making Brazil the first nation from South America to join the ISU. The first national championships – the Rio Open of Figure Skating – were held in 2015 in Rio de Janeiro.

In 2009, Kevin Alves became the first man to represent Brazil in international competition, at the 2009 Four Continents Figure Skating Championships. In 2014, Isadora Williams became the first skater from Brazil to qualify for the Winter Olympics, and in 2018, she became the first skater from Brazil – and all of South America – to reach the free skate at the Winter Olympics. The first time that Williams actually competed in Brazil was at the 2019 Brazilian Championships, held at the ice rink of the ParkShopping Canoas, an indoor shopping mall in Canoas. Matheus Figueiredo, president of the Brazilian Ice Sports Federation, stated: "The specific intention behind bringing the event to the shopping mall was to promote the sport, fostering interaction with the public and giving them the opportunity to watch an Olympian, who, for the first time in her career, was competing in Brazil." When Williams announced her retirement from competitive skating in 2021, she stated that she wanted to finish her career by competing at the 2021 Brazilian Championships, but injury prevented her from doing so.

Medals are awarded in men's and women's singles at the senior and junior levels, although each discipline may not necessarily be held every year due to a lack of participants. In 2017, the Brazilian Ice Sports Federation reorganized the structure of their national championships to align with that of the ISU. This included dividing skaters into separate competitions based on their age and technical level, as well as adopting the ISU Judging System. The Brazilian Championships were cancelled in 2020 owing to the COVID-19 pandemic.

== Senior medalists ==
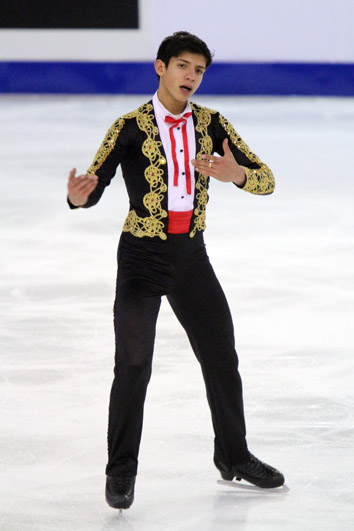
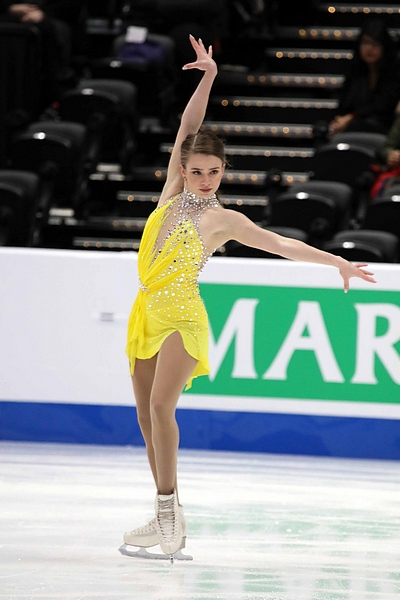
Kevin Alves and Isadora Williams were the first man and the first woman to represent Brazil in international competition.

=== Men's singles ===
Men's event medalists
Season	Location	Gold	Silver	Bronze	Ref.
2015–16	Rio de Janeiro	Rafael Barga	Leonardo Araújo	No other competitors	
2016–17	Rio de Janeiro	Rafael Barga	Leonardo Araújo	Valmir Belangieri Jr.	
2017–18	Gramado	Rafael Barga	Leonardo Araújo	No other competitors	
2018–19	Gramado	Felipe Kubo	Rafael Barga	Arthur Casado	
2019–20	Canoas	No men's competitors			
2020–21	Competition cancelled due to the COVID-19 pandemic				
2021–22	São Paulo	Laerte Oliveira	Arthur Casado	Leonardo Araújo	
2022–23	São Paulo	Leonardo Araújo	Arthur Casado	Derrick Camargo	
2023–24	São Paulo	Arthur Alcorte	Guilherme Ferrazzi	No other competitors	
2024–25	São Paulo	Arthur Alcorte	No other competitors		
2025–26	São Paulo	Arthur Alcorte	Diogo da Costa	No other competitors	

=== Women's singles ===
Women's event medalists
Season	Location	Gold	Silver	Bronze	Ref.
2015–16	Rio de Janeiro	Simone Pastusiak	Jaqueline Pastusiak	No other competitors	
2016–17	Rio de Janeiro	Simone Pastusiak	Marcele Cataldo	Thalita Gomes	
2017–18	Gramado	Deborah Bell	Simone Pastusiak	No other competitors	
2018–19	Gramado	Deborah Bell	Sophia Duchemin	Marcele Cataldo	
2019–20	Canoas	Isadora Williams	Deborah Bell	No other competitors	
2020–21	Competition cancelled due to the COVID-19 pandemic				
2021–22	São Paulo	Deborah Bell	Ana Decottignies	No other competitors	
2022–23	São Paulo	Ana Decottignies	No other competitors		
2023–24	São Paulo	No women's competitors			
2024–25	São Paulo	Deborah Bell	No other competitors		
2025–26	São Paulo	No women's competitors			

== Junior medalists ==
While junior-level championships were held in Brazil prior to 2019, this is earliest for which full results have been documented.

=== Men's singles ===
Junior men's event medalists
Season	Location	Gold	Silver	Bronze	Ref.
2019–20	Canoas	No junior men's competitors			
2020–21	Competition cancelled due to the COVID-19 pandemic				
2021–22	São Paulo	Felipe Kubo	No other competitors		
2022–23	São Paulo	No junior men's competitors			
2023–24	São Paulo	Lucaz Candria	No other competitors		
2024–25	São Paulo	Lucaz Candria	Diogo da Costa	No other competitors	
2025–26	São Paulo	João Vitor Cavalcanti	Lucaz Candria	No other competitors	

=== Women's singles ===
Junior women's event medalists
Season	Location	Gold	Silver	Bronze	Ref.
2019–20	Canoas	Sophia Duchemin	Ana Decottignies	No other competitors	
2020–21	Competition cancelled due to the COVID-19 pandemic				
2021–22	São Paulo	Maria Reikdal	Daniella Totzke	No other competitors	
2022–23	São Paulo	Maria Reikdal	Beatriz Dolbeth	No other competitors	
2023–24	São Paulo	Maria Reikdal	No other competitors		
2024–25	São Paulo	Maria Reikdal	Beatriz Dolbeth	No other competitors	
2025–26	São Paulo	Elena Mills	Beatriz Dolbeth	No other competitors	
