= João Vitor Cavalcanti =

Brazilian figure skater

Personal information
- Full name: João Vitor Cavalcanti Reikdal
- Born: 29 March 2008 (age 18)
- Home town: Curitiba, Brazil
- Height: 154 cm (5 ft 1 in)

Figure skating career
- Country: Brazil
- Coach: Gustavo Cavalcanti
- Skating club: Footwork Patinação e Dança
- Began skating: 2017
Medal record
Representing Brazil
Artistic inline skating
Artistic Skating World Championships
Gold medal – first place	Ibagué 2023	Junior Women
Silver medal – second place	Assunción 2021	Junior Women

João Vitor Cavalcanti Reikdal (born March 29, 2008) is a Brazilian figure skater and artistic roller skater. He is the 2025 national champion in the junior men’s singles category for figure skating, the 2026 national runner-up in artistic roller skating (freestyle), and the 2026 national champion in artistic inline skating.

Previously competing as Maria Joaquina Cavalcanti Reikdal (pronounced [maɾ'ia ʒoak'ina kavawkɐ̃ntʃi ɾeykdaw]), he was known as the first transgender woman to compete in an ISU sanctioned figure skating event, before announcing his detransition in 2025 and following switch from ladies' singles to men's singles.

Prior to detransition, he was the 2023 World Artistic Inline Skating junior champion and 2021 silver medalist, the 2023 South American Inline Artistic Skating champion, and three-time Brazilian artistic inline skating junior national champion (2021-2023). In figure skating, he was a four-time Brazilian junior national champion (2021-2024).

== Personal life ==
Cavalcanti was put in foster care at the age of six after neglectful and abusive behavior from his biological family towards him and his siblings. At the orphanage, he suffered bullying from the other kids, as well as physical and verbal abuse from the carers for behaving in a feminine way despite being assigned male at birth. He was adopted, along with his two siblings, by Cleber Reikdal and Gustavo Uchoa Cavalcanti on December 4, 2016. A few months before his ninth birthday, he came out as a transgender girl to his family and, shortly after, began receiving psychological support at the Hospital das Clínicas de São Paulo's Research Institute's Transdisciplinary Ambulatory of Gender Identity and Sexual Orientation (AMTIGOS).

In 2020, Cavalcanti managed to legally change his name and his legal sex marker on his birth certificate after a three-year legal battle. That way, he satisfied the skating federations' requirements to skate in the women's category for pre-pubescent transgender girls at the time.

His journey gained national attention after experiencing discrimination in 2019 during the national and South American artistic roller skating championships. Cavalcanti became a symbol of the fight against prejudice and was invited to appear in a music video for singer Pabllo Vittar.

In 2025 (the year before reaching the age of majority) João announced publicly on his social media that he had begun the process of detransitioning, discontinuing the use of puberty blockers and returning to the use of his legal birth name and male gender. Cleber Reikdal, his adoptive father and choreographer, passed away in November 2025.

== Skating career ==
=== Early career ===
Cavalcanti began skating at eight, influenced by his parents, both artistic roller skating coaches. He placed second in his age category in the girls' segment at the Brazilian Artistic Skating Championships in 2019, which secured him a spot at the 2019 South American Artistic Skating Championships. However, he was not called up for the competition due to his legal documents not being updated to reflect his name and gender. In Brazil, minors can only get their name changed through a judge's decision and thus, his family had to go to court to get authorization for him to compete. Although granted permission, he faced discrimination at the championship such as not being allowed to wear the official team outfit or use the bathroom at the event. he finished 13th in the competition after falling four times during his performance.

Encouraged by his father and coach, Cavalcanti decided to focus on figure skating, training on inline skates when ice was unavailable and aiming for the 2026 Winter Olympics. he won gold in the advanced novice category at the 2019 Brazilian Figure Skating Championships with a score of 50.70, a higher score than all the junior ladies' at that year.

=== 2021-2022 season: International artistic inline skating debut ===
At 13, he moved to the junior category and won both the 2020 (which took place a year later) and 2021 artistic inline skating national championships, earning a spot on the national team for the 2021 World Championships. he became the youngest skater on the national team and finished as the junior silver medalist with a total score of 102.99 points. This achievement made him the first medalist from Curitiba in a World Artistic Skating Championship, which earned him a special sports merit medal from the city mayor.

In December 2021, he won the junior title at the Brazilian Figure Skating Championships, landing his first triple jump, a triple Salchow, in a figure skating competition.

=== 2022-2023 season: International figure skating debut ===
Cavalcanti began 2022 with another Junior national championship win in artistic inline skating, earning a spot in the South American Roller Sports Game. he declined the spot after being invited to attend an ISU training camp in Italy for figure skating, in order to improve his technique and compete at the 2022-23 ISU Junior Grand Prix series.

In July 2022, Cavalcanti won his second junior title at the Brazilian Figure Skating Championships. In September, he became the first Brazilian-born athlete to compete in the junior women's category in an ISU sanctioned event and the first transgender skater to compete internationally in junior ice skating. In his first competition in September at the 2022 JGP Latvia, he finished 33rd out of 34 skaters. The following month he competed at the 2022 JGP Italy, where he placed 39th out of 44 skaters.

After facing harassment and discrimination from an official of the Brazilian Ice Sports Federation, Cavalcanti spent four months away from skating before returning in January 2023.

=== 2023-2024 season: World Junior artistic inline champion ===
In February 2023, Cavalcanti returned to artistic inline skating competition, winning the 2023 Brazilian Artistic Roller Skating Championship at the junior artistic inline category and earning another spot in the South American Roller Sports Games. In April, he won his first South American title in junior inline artistic skating.

In July, he won his third consecutive junior title at the Brazilian Figure Skating Championships, qualifying for the Junior Grand Prix stages in Linz and Osaka. he went on to compete at the 2023 JGP Austria, finishing 31st. He withdrew from his second JGP event in Japan in order to compete at the Artistic Skating World Championships.

In September 2023, Cavalcanti became the junior inline world champion at the 2023 World Artistic Skating Championship in Ibagué, Colombia, with a total score of 106.66 points. In the mixed zone, he expressed gratitude for the support he received and discussed his future plans, emphasizing the ongoing challenges of dealing with prejudice in sports.

=== 2024-25 season ===
In July 2024, Cavalcanti competed in the Brazilian Figure Skating Championships, winning his fourth consecutive junior title.

=== 2025-26 season ===
In 2025, after years of competing in the women’s category, the athlete publicly announced his gender detransition and began using the name João Vitor Cavalcanti Reikdal. In a video posted on his social media, he stated that he had decided to return to identifying as male and to stop using puberty blockers.. The change occurred before his majority. After announcing the detransition, João Vitor also began to use his male name again in sports records, in which he began to appear as João Vitor Cavalcanti Reikdal and compete in the junior men's category.

At the 2025 Brazilian Figure Skating Championship, João Vitor competed in the junior men's category and won the national title, with a total of 119.32 points.. The result marked his first Brazilian title in the men's category after the period in which he had competed in the women's category.

=== 2026-27 season ===
The athlete was part of the Brazilian delegation at the fourth edition of the Latin American Regional Interclub Championship, held at Arena Ice Brasil in São Paulo. João placed second in both segments of the junior men’s individual competition, finishing behind fellow Brazilian Lucaz Filipe Candria..

== Programs ==
Season	Short program	Free skating	Exhibition
2026-2027	Lacrimosa; by Wolfgang Amadeus Mozart	Exit Music (For a Film); by Radiohead	
2025-2026	Lacrimosa; by Wolfgang Amadeus Mozart	Stars (from Les Miserables); by Claude-Michel Schönberg performed by Russell Crowe	
2024-2025	What Was I Made For? (from Barbie); by Billie Eilish performed by Lauren Babic	I Dreamed a Dream (from Les Misérables); by Claude-Michel Schönberg performed by Anne Hathaway	
2023-2024	The Puss Suite (from Puss in Boots); by Henry Jackman choreographed by Luca Demattè: You're the One That I Want; by John Farrar performed by Lo-Fang: A Queda; by Gloria Groove	Queen Orchestral Medley: Flash's Theme; You're My Best Friend; Bohemian Rhapsody; Crazy Little Thing Called Love; We Are The Champions; by Brian May, John Deacon and Freddie Mercury performed by Louis Clark, Royal Philharmonic Orchestra and The Royal Choral Society: L'Amore Sei Tu; by Dolly Parton and Nick Patrick performed by Katherine Jenkins, The Prague Symphonia and Anthony Ingliss: Eleanor Rigby (Slowed + Reverb); by John Lennon e Paul McCartney performed by Cody Fry and The Lonely People Orchestra	
2022-2023	The Puss Suite (from Puss in Boots); by Henry Jackman choreo. by Luca Demattè: Parte do Seu Mundo (from A Pequena Sereia); by Alan Menken performed by Kiara Sasso	Rio: Mamooth (from Ice Age: The Meltdown); Morning Routine (from Rio); Flying (from Rio); by John Powell: Market Forro (from Rio); by Carlinhos Brown and Mikael Mutti choreo. by Luca Demattè: Libertango; by Astor Piazzolla por Bond: Libertango; by Astor Piazzolla performed by Octeto Erica di Salvo: Tango de Los Exilados; by Vanessa-Mae: Mi Buenos Aires Querido; by Carlos Garcia: Victory; performed by Bond: La Cumparsita; by Gerardo Matos Rodríguez	Parte do Seu Mundo (from A Pequena Sereia); by Alan Menken performed by Kiara Sasso
2021–2022	Never Enough (from The Greatest Showman); performed by Boyce Avenue	Caruso; performed by Lara Fabian: Nessun Dorma (de Turandot); by Giacomo Puccini performed by Katherine Jenkins	Caruso; performed by Lara Fabian: Nessun Dorma (de Turandot); de Giacomo Puccini performed by Katherine Jenkins: Colors Of The Wind (from Pocahontas); performed by Tori Kelly
2019–2020	A Whole New World (from Aladdin); by Lea Salonga and Brad Kane: Finale Ultimo (from Alladin); performed by Aladdin's Original Broadway Cast	I Am What I Am; by Gloria Gaynor	Rajadão; performed by Pabllo Vittar: I'm Still Standing (from Rocketman); by Elton John performed by Taron Egerton
2018-2019		I Will Follow Him (from Sister Act); performed by Deloris & The Sisters	

== Competitive highlights ==
=== Figure skating for Brazil ===
International: Junior
Event	21–22 (ladies')	22–23 (ladies')	23–24 (ladies')	24–25 (ladies')	25-26 (men's)
JGP Austria			31st		
JGP Italy		39th			
JGP Latvia		33rd			
Open Sul-Americano			1st		
Open América Latina		1st			
Latino Americano Interclubes					2nd
National
Brazilian Championships	1st J	1st J	1st J	1st J	1st J
J = Junior level					

=== Artistic inline skating for Brazil ===
International: Junior
Event	2020	2021	2022	2023
World Championships	C	2nd J		1st J
South American Championships			WD	1st J
National
Brazilian Championships	1st E	1st J	1st J	1st J
Levels: E = Espoire; J = Junior; C = Cancelled
