= Mai Asada =

Japanese figure skater (born 1988)

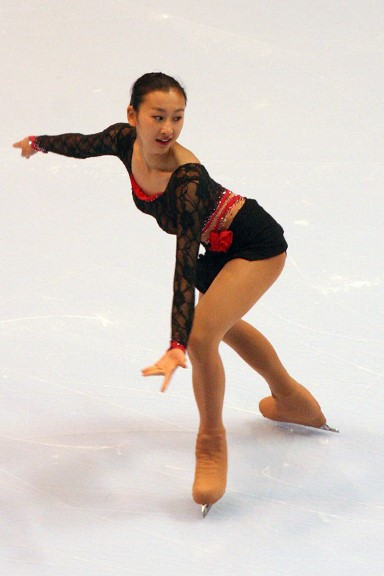
- Mai Asada in 2006

Personal information
- Born: 17 July 1988 (age 38) Meitō-ku, Nagoya, Japan
- Height: 1.63 m (5 ft 4 in)

Figure skating career
- Country: Japan
- Skating club: Grand Prix Tokai FSC; Chukyo University Nagoya
- Began skating: 1996

Mai Asada (浅田 舞, Asada Mai; born 17 July 1988) is a Japanese former competitive figure skater. She won two gold medals on the ISU Junior Grand Prix series and placed fourth at the 2003 and 2004 World Junior Championships. She made her senior international debut at the 2006 Four Continents Championships, where she placed sixth.

Asada studied ballet before taking up skating at the age of eight or nine. She is the elder sister of Mao Asada, a three-time World champion and the 2010 Olympic silver medalist.

Asada has worked as a model and TV presenter.

== Programs ==
Season	Short program	Free skating	Exhibition
2007–2008	Romeo and Juliet by Pyotr I. Tchaikovsky choreo. by Tatiana Tarasova	Swan Lake by Pyotr I. Tchaikovsky choreo. by Lori Nichol	
2003–2004	Spanish Dance No. 1 by Manuel de Falla	Romance by Ludwig van Beethoven	What I Am To You
2002–2003	Gabriel's Oboe (from The Mission) by David Agnew	Rondo Adagio Espressivo	

== Competitive highlights ==
International
Event	02–03	03–04	04–05	05–06	06–07	07–08	08–09
Four Continents				6th			
GP Cup of China					6th		
GP Skate America					6th	8th	
International: Junior
Junior Worlds	4th	4th					
JGP Final		4th		5th			
JGP Andorra				1st			
JGP Japan		2nd		4th			
JGP Serbia			5th				
JGP Slovakia		1st					
National
Japan Champ.	8th	6th	8th	8th	8th	12th	15th
Japan Junior	2nd	2nd	2nd	7th			
