= Meitō-ku =

Meitō 名東区
- Ward
- Meitō Ward
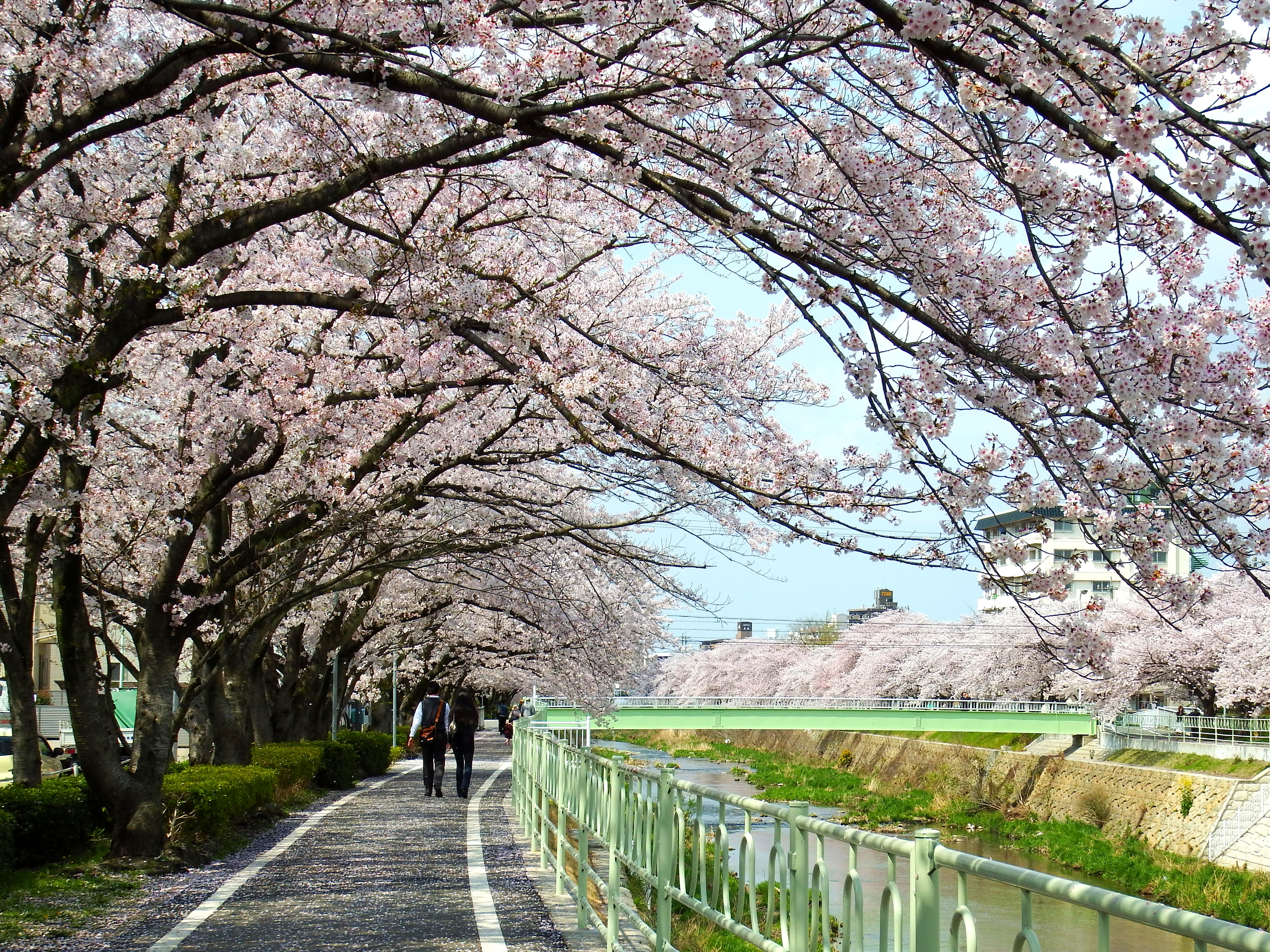
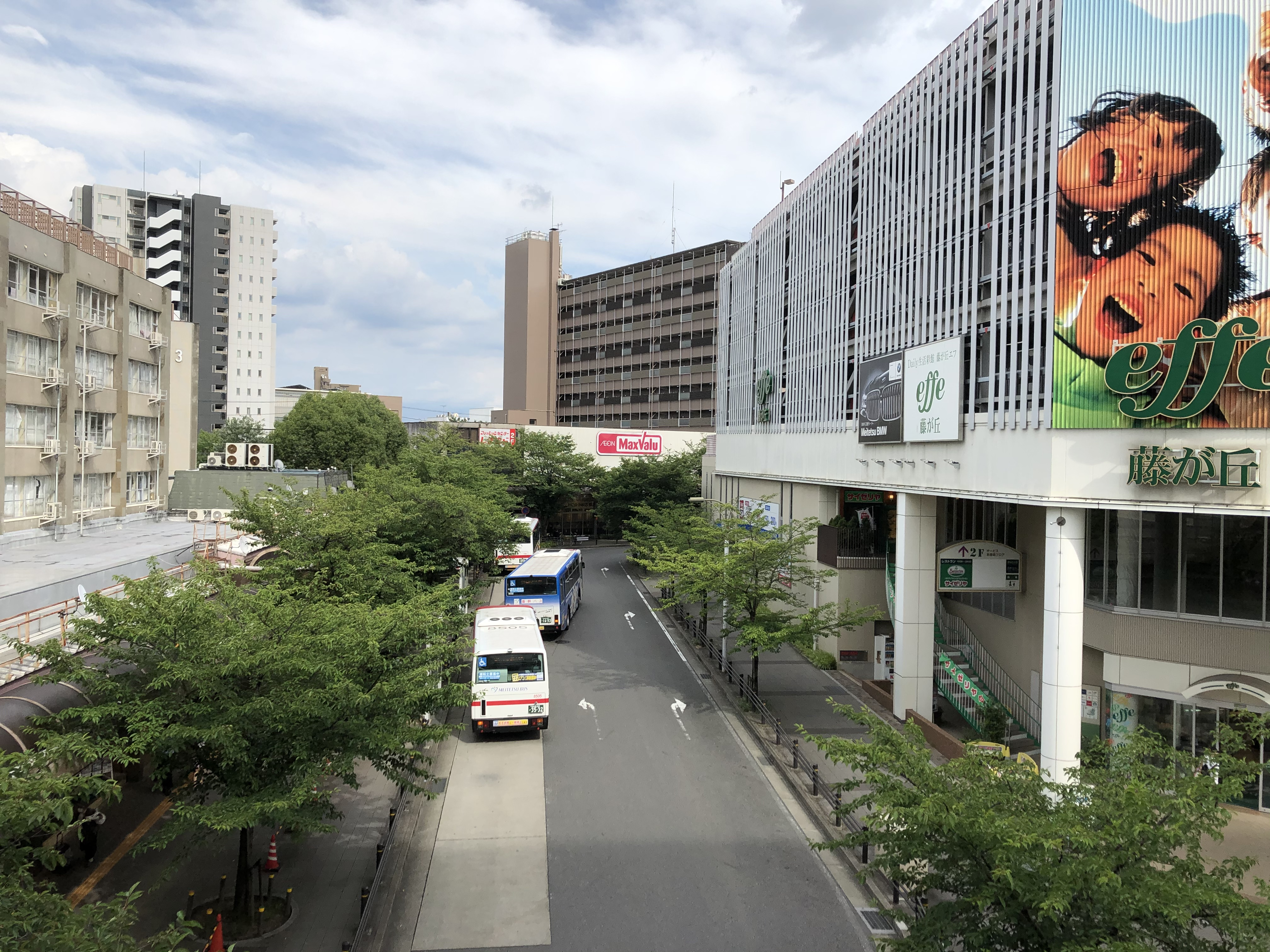
- Kanare River; Fujigaoka

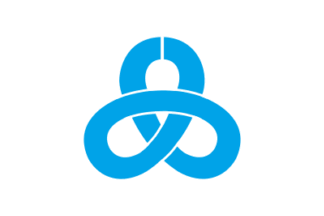
- Flag

- Location of Meitō-ku in Nagoya

- Coordinates: 35°10′33″N 137°0′37″E
- Country: Japan
- Region: Tōkai region Chūbu region
- Prefecture: Aichi
- City: Nagoya

Area
  - Total: 19.45 km^{2} (7.51 sq mi)

Population (October 1, 2019)
  - Total: 165,287
  - Density: 8,498/km^{2} (22,010/sq mi)
- Time zone: UTC+9 (Japan Standard Time)
- Tree: Zelkova serrata
- Flower: Dianthus
- Phone number: 052-773-1111
- Address: 2-15 Kamisha, Meitō-ku, Nagoya-shi, Aichi-ken 464-8644
- Website: www.city.nagoya.jp/meito/ (in Japanese)

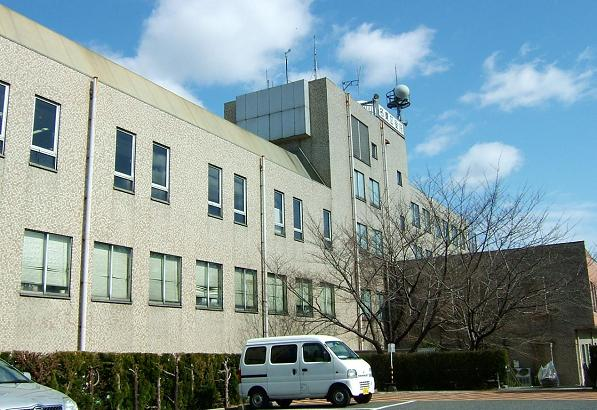
Meitō-ku Ward Office

Meitō-ku (名東区, Meitō-ku) is one of the 16 wards of the city of Nagoya in Aichi Prefecture, Japan. As of 1 October 2019, the ward had an estimated population of 165,287 and a population density of 8,498 persons per km^{2}. The total area was 19.45 km^{2}.

== Geography ==
Meitō Ward is located in eastern Nagoya city.

=== Surrounding municipalities ===
- Moriyama Ward
- Chikusa Ward
- Tenpaku Ward
- Nisshin
- Nagakute

=== Towns and villages ===
- Fujigaoka

== History ==
The area of present Meitō-ku was formerly part of Aichi District and Higashikasugai District. Incorporated into the city of Nagoya by 1955 and divided between Chikusa Ward and Showa Ward, it became a separate ward on February 1, 1975.

== Education ==
- Aichi Toho University

== Transportation ==
=== Railroads ===
- Aichi Rapid Transit Company - Linimo
  - Fujigaoka
- Nagoya Municipal Subway – Higashiyama Line
  - Issha - Kamiyashiro - Hongō - Fujigaoka

=== Highways ===
- Tōmei Expressway
- Nagoya Dai-ni Kanjo Expressway
- Route 2 (Nagoya Expressway)
- Japan National Route 302
- Japan National Route 363

== Noted people from Meitō-ku, Nagoya ==
- Shibata Katsuie – Samurai during the Sengoku period
- Mao Asada – professional figure skater
- Mai Asada – professional figure skater, model, actress
- Tetsuo Nakanishi – professional soccer player
- Kayo Satoh – model, actress
