= 2005 Cup of China =

- Type: Grand Prix
- Date: November 2 – 6
- Season: 2005–06
- Location: Beijing
- Host: Chinese Skating Association
- Venue: Capital Gymnasium

Champions
- Men's singles: (Canada) Emanuel Sandhu
- Ladies' singles: (Russia) Irina Slutskaya
- Pairs: (Russia) Maria Petrova / Alexei Tikhonov
- Ice dance: (Russia) Tatiana Navka / Roman Kostomarov
- Previous: 2004 Cup of China
- Next: 2006 Cup of China
- Previous Grand Prix: 2005 Skate Canada International
- Next Grand Prix: 2005 Trophée Éric Bompard

The 2005 Cup of China was the third event of six in the 2005–06 ISU Grand Prix of Figure Skating, a senior-level international invitational competition series. It was held at the Capital Gymnasium in Beijing on November 2–6. Medals were awarded in the disciplines of men's singles, ladies' singles, pair skating, and ice dancing. Skaters earned points toward qualifying for the 2005–06 Grand Prix Final. The compulsory dance was the Tango Romantica.

== Results ==
=== Men ===
Rank	Name	Nation	Total points	SP		FS	
1	Emanuel Sandhu	Canada	212.66	4	65.10	1	147.56
2	Stéphane Lambiel	Switzerland	203.60	3	70.20	2	133.40
3	Andrei Griazev	Russia	200.60	1	71.00	3	129.60
4	Ben Ferreira	Canada	185.33	6	62.83	4	122.50
5	Zhang Min	China	178.31	8	58.09	5	120.22
6	Ryan Jahnke	United States	177.02	5	64.80	8	112.22
7	Matthew Savoie	United States	174.37	9	57.07	6	117.30
8	Li Chengjiang	China	173.69	2	70.25	10	103.44
9	Alban Préaubert	France	166.77	12	50.93	7	115.84
10	Wu Jialiang	China	158.86	7	58.16	12	100.70
11	Kazumi Kishimoto	Japan	157.74	10	53.14	9	104.60
12	Roman Serov	Israel	155.90	11	52.74	11	103.16

=== Ladies ===
Rank	Name	Nation	Total points	SP		FS	
1	Irina Slutskaya	Russia	196.12	1	70.22	1	125.90
2	Mao Asada	Japan	176.60	2	62.92	3	113.68
3	Shizuka Arakawa	Japan	173.60	3	57.56	2	116.04
4	Elena Liashenko	Ukraine	160.70	4	57.52	4	103.18
5	Liu Yan	China	145.92	5	47.72	5	98.20
6	Viktória Pavuk	Hungary	129.84	8	42.00	6	87.84
7	Fang Dan	China	122.54	7	44.22	7	78.32
8	Hou Na	China	106.34	6	44.88	10	61.46
9	Idora Hegel	Croatia	104.78	9	41.42	8	63.36
10	Amber Corwin	United States	91.06	10	28.28	9	62.78

=== Pairs ===
Rank	Name	Nation	Total points	SP		FS	
1	Maria Petrova / Alexei Tikhonov	Russia	185.38	1	62.76	1	122.62
2	Pang Qing / Tong Jian	China	176.46	2	58.64	2	117.82
3	Dorota Zagorska / Mariusz Siudek	Poland	162.48	3	56.06	3	106.42
4	Jessica Dubé / Bryce Davison	Canada	157.48	4	53.16	4	104.32
5	Natalia Shestakova / Pavel Lebedev	Russia	142.12	6	45.88	5	96.24
6	Katie Orscher / Garrett Lucash	United States	129.98	5	49.02	6	80.96
7	Marina Aganina / Artem Knyazev	Uzbekistan	114.46	8	36.72	7	77.74
8	Rumiana Spassova / Stanimir Todorov	Bulgaria	109.74	7	36.76	8	72.98

=== Ice dancing ===
Rank	Name	Nation	Total points	CD		OD		FD	
1	Tatiana Navka / Roman Kostomarov	Russia	197.07	1	36.83	1	58.50	1	101.74
2	Galit Chait / Sergei Sakhnovski	Israel	186.13	2	34.23	2	55.81	2	96.09
3	Megan Wing / Aaron Lowe	Canada	163.36	4	31.58	3	50.61	4	81.17
4	Kristin Fraser / Igor Lukanin	Azerbaijan	161.58	5	29.15	6	47.62	3	84.81
5	Morgan Matthews / Maxim Zavozin	United States	157.72	6	28.51	5	48.89	5	80.32
6	Federica Faiella / Massimo Scali	Italy	156.35	3	32.03	4	49.32	6	75.00
7	Alexandra Kauc / Michał Zych	Poland	142.57	7	26.41	7	43.48	7	72.68
8	Julia Golovina / Oleg Voiko	Ukraine	134.21	8	26.03	8	41.71	8	66.47
9	Alexandra Zaretski / Roman Zaretski	Israel	129.87	9	24.36	9	39.37	9	66.14
10	Yu Xiaoyang / Wang Chen	China	127.37	10	22.98	10	38.67	10	65.72
