= Mao Asada =

Japanese figure skater (born 1990)

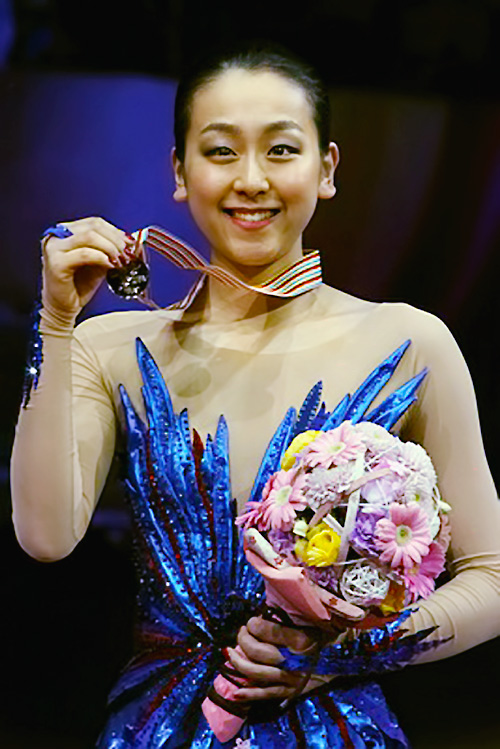
- Mao Asada at the 2014 World Championships.

Personal information
- Native name: 浅田 真央
- Born: 25 September 1990 (age 36) Meitō-ku, Nagoya, Aichi, Japan
- Height: 1.63 m (5 ft 4 in)

Figure skating career
- Country: Japan
- Discipline: Women's singles
- Skating club: Chukyo University
- Began skating: 1995
- Competitive: 1999–2017
- Professional: 2017–present
- Highest WS: 1st (2007, 2008, 2014)

Medal record
Event	Gold medal – first place	Silver medal – second place	Bronze medal – third place
Olympic Games	0	1	0
World Championships	3	1	1
Four Continents Championships	3	2	1
Grand Prix Final	4	2	0
Japanese Championships	6	3	2
World Team Trophy	0	0	2
World Junior Championships	1	1	0
Junior Grand Prix Final	1	0	0
Medal list
Olympic Games
Silver medal – second place	2010 Vancouver	Singles
World Championships
Gold medal – first place	2008 Gothenburg	Singles
Gold medal – first place	2010 Turin	Singles
Gold medal – first place	2014 Saitama	Singles
Silver medal – second place	2007 Tokyo	Singles
Bronze medal – third place	2013 London	Singles
Four Continents Championships
Gold medal – first place	2008 Goyang	Singles
Gold medal – first place	2010 Jeonju	Singles
Gold medal – first place	2013 Osaka	Singles
Silver medal – second place	2011 Taipei	Singles
Silver medal – second place	2012 Colorado Springs	Singles
Bronze medal – third place	2009 Vancouver	Singles
Grand Prix Final
Gold medal – first place	2005–06 Tokyo	Singles
Gold medal – first place	2008–09 Goyang	Singles
Gold medal – first place	2012–13 Sochi	Singles
Gold medal – first place	2013–14 Fukuoka	Singles
Silver medal – second place	2006–07 St. Petersburg	Singles
Silver medal – second place	2007–08 Turin	Singles
Japanese Championships
Gold medal – first place	2006–07 Nagoya	Singles
Gold medal – first place	2007–08 Osaka	Singles
Gold medal – first place	2008–09 Nagano	Singles
Gold medal – first place	2009–10 Osaka	Singles
Gold medal – first place	2011–12 Osaka	Singles
Gold medal – first place	2012–13 Sapporo	Singles
Silver medal – second place	2004–05 Yokohama	Singles
Silver medal – second place	2005–06 Tokyo	Singles
Silver medal – second place	2010–11 Nagano	Singles
Bronze medal – third place	2013–14 Saitama	Singles
Bronze medal – third place	2015–16 Sapporo	Singles
World Team Trophy
Bronze medal – third place	2009 Tokyo	Team
Bronze medal – third place	2013 Tokyo	Team
World Junior Championships
Gold medal – first place	2005 Kitchener	Singles
Silver medal – second place	2006 Ljubljana	Singles
Junior Grand Prix Final
Gold medal – first place	2004–05 Helsinki	Singles

Mao Asada (浅田 真央, Asada Mao; born 25 September 1990) is a Japanese former competitive figure skater. She is the 2010 Olympic silver medalist, a three-time World champion (2008, 2010, 2014), a three-time Four Continents champion (2008, 2010, 2013), and a four-time Grand Prix Final champion (2005–06, 2008–09, 2012–13, 2013–14). She is the first female figure skater who has landed three triple Axel jumps in one competition, which she achieved at the 2010 Winter Olympics.

Asada is also the 2005 World Junior champion, the 2004–05 Junior Grand Prix Final champion, and a six-time Japanese national champion (2006–2009, 2011–2012).

She is the former world record holder for the ladies' short program score, which she set at the 2014 World Championships and held until it was broken by Evgenia Medvedeva in 2016. A former prodigy, Asada is the fifth woman and the first junior girl to land the triple Axel, accomplishing this at the 2004–05 Junior Grand Prix Final. She won her first Grand Prix Final at the age of 15. Considered by many to be the best figure skater in the world at that time, Asada was 87 days too young to compete at the 2006 Winter Olympics. She is the first figure skater in a singles discipline from Asia to win multiple world championships. At the 2013 Skate America, she became the first singles skater, male or female, to win all seven of the current events on the Grand Prix series. She holds 15 Grand Prix series titles, the second-highest total among ladies and the sixth-highest total among skaters of all four disciplines.

Due to her success in ISU competitions, she became one of the most highly recognized and prominent athletes in Japan and is widely considered to be one of the greatest women's figure skaters of all time. She has been credited with helping to popularize the style of figure skating that combined athleticism and artistry. Several notable athletes, including Yuzuru Hanyu and Shoma Uno have regarded Asada as a role model.

== Personal life ==
Mao Asada was born on 25 September 1990, in Meitō-ku, Nagoya, Aichi, Japan. She was named after the Japanese actress Mao Daichi. She attended Nagoya International School until the middle of 1st grade. After transferring, she graduated from Takabari Elementary School and Takabaridai Junior High. She received her high school diploma from Chukyo High School on 15 March 2009. After that, she enrolled in Chukyo University and graduated in March 2015. While growing up, she idolized Midori Ito. She learned to skate after school almost every day.

Her sister Mai Asada (two years older) is also a figure skater. She won two gold medals on the ISU Junior Grand Prix series and finished 6th at the 2006 Four Continents Championships. Now she works as a TV presenter and skates in ice shows.

Asada owned a miniature poodle named Aero, who is named after the chocolate confection made by Nestlé. She has included Aero in exhibition programs. She also acquired two other dogs named Tiara and Komachi.

On 11 November 2024, Asada opened a figure skating rink in Tachikawa, Tokyo called, "MAO RINK." During the opening ceremony commemorating it opening, she said, "I think this is the best rink in the world. My next goal is to produce skaters who can become world number one."

== Career ==
=== Early career ===
Mao Asada studied classical ballet from the age of three to nine, but followed her sister in switching to figure skating.

She won the Japanese novice national championships in the 2002–03 season, earning an invitation to compete at the junior championships, where she placed 4th. She also competed in the senior national championships and placed 7th.

In the 2003–04 season, Asada repeated the same placements at the novice and junior level and placed 8th at the senior nationals. She won the Mladost Trophy, her first international event.

=== 2004–05 season ===
In the 2004–05 season, Asada was age-eligible for junior international competitions. She competed in the ISU Junior Grand Prix series, winning both of her events. At the Junior Grand Prix Final, she won gold with an overall score 35.08 points ahead of the silver medalist, Yuna Kim. She became the first junior ladies skater to land a triple axel in competition, and the fifth woman overall. Asada won the Japanese Junior National championships, ahead of her sister who took the silver medal, and qualified for the 2005 Junior Worlds.

Asada's win earned her an invitation to the senior national championships, where she won the silver medal. Asada was not age-eligible for the 2005 World Championships. At the Junior World Championships, she won with a 20.31 lead over the silver medalist Kim Yuna. She also set the junior-level ladies' record for the combined total (179.24 points) and the free skating (119.13 points). Both records lasted until October 2011 when they were broken by Yulia Lipnitskaya.

=== 2005–06 season ===
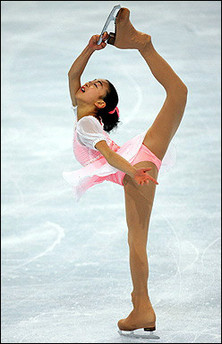
Asada does a one-handed Biellmann spin during her free skating The Nutcracker (2005–06 season).

After winning all major competitions at the junior level, Asada moved to the senior level during the 2005–06 season and competed on the Senior Grand Prix circuit. During the Grand Prix Circuit, Asada defeated future medalists of 2006 Torino Winter Olympics – gold medalist Shizuka Arakawa, silver medalist Sasha Cohen, and bronze medalist Irina Slutskaya. At the 2005 Cup of China, she placed second in the short program and third in the free skating and won the silver medal. Asada won her second event, the 2005 Trophée Eric Bompard, after placing first in both the short and free skating. She earned a total score of 182.42 points, 7.30 points ahead over silver medalist Sasha Cohen and 9.12 points ahead of bronze medalist Shizuka Arakawa. Her medals qualified Asada for the 2005–06 Grand Prix Final. At her first Senior Grand Prix Final appearance, Asada won the event at the age of 15 years. She got a total score of 189.62 points after placing first in both programs, 8.14 points ahead of silver medalist Irina Slutskaya.

At the 2005–06 Japan Championships, Asada placed third in both programs and won the silver medal behind Fumie Suguri. She was ineligible for the Olympics that year. At the 2006 World Junior Championships, Asada finished 24.19 points behind gold medalist Yuna Kim, and 18.21 points ahead of bronze medalist Christine Zukowski. At this competition, Asada became the first lady to land a triple Axel in the short program at an ISU championship.

=== 2006–07 season ===
Asada moved from Japan to the United States in August 2006 to train with Rafael Arutyunyan in Lake Arrowhead, California. There she was able to escape the overcrowding of Japanese rinks and the pressure of the Japanese media.

At her first event, the 2006 Skate America, Asada won the bronze medal behind Miki Ando and Kimmie Meissner. While she won the short program, she placed fourth in the free skate, with a total score 171.23 points. She was 21.36 points out of first place. Asada won her second event, the 2006 NHK Trophy with 199.52 points, setting the highest combined score in a Ladies' competition under the ISU Judging System and consequently, a world record. Her margin of victory was 20.21 points ahead of silver medalist Fumie Suguri. Asada went into the 2006–07 Grand Prix Final as the reigning champion. She placed second with 172.52 points, 11.68 behind gold medalist Yuna Kim. Asada had won the short program, but placed fourth in the free skating.

Asada won the 2006–07 Japan Championships by 26.11 points ahead of silver medalist Miki Ando. At the 2007 Worlds Championships, Asada was fifth in the short program, 10.03 points behind Yuna Kim, who placed first in that section of the competition with a score of 71.95 points, setting a new world record for the highest short program score. Asada won the free skating with a score of 133.13 points, setting a new world record for the highest free skate score, a record that stood for eight months. During her free skating, she successfully landed a triple Axel, a triple flip-triple loop combination, a double Axel, a triple Lutz, a triple flip, and a triple Lutz-double loop-double loop combination, but under-rotated the second jump of a double Axel-triple toe loop combination. She won the silver medal at her first Senior World Championships appearance, earning an overall of 194.95 points, 0.64 behind gold medalist Miki Ando and 8.31 ahead of Yuna Kim, who won the bronze.

=== 2007–08 season ===
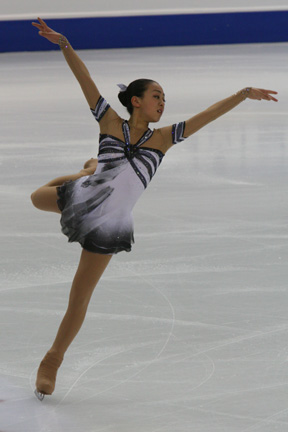
Asada performs her free skate to Fantasie-Impromptu at the 2007–08 Grand Prix Final.

During the summer of 2007, Asada received additional training in Russia from Tatiana Tarasova, while Arutyunyan remained her primary coach. At the 2007 Skate Canada International, Asada was third in the short program and first in the free skate, finishing first ahead of silver medalist Yukari Nakano. Asada won her second gold at the 2007 Trophée Eric Bompard with over 21 points ahead of silver medalist Kimmie Meissner.

Asada advanced to the 2007–08 Grand Prix Final in Turin, Italy. In the short program, Asada failed to complete a required solo jump and placed 6th with a score of 59.04 points. The next day, she won the free skate with 132.55 points. She executed a triple Axel, a triple flip-triple toe loop combination, a triple loop, a triple flip-triple loop, a double Axel-double loop-double loop combination, and a double Axel, but had a change-of-edge error in triple Lutz. She won the silver medal with 191.59 points, 5.24 behind gold medalist Yuna Kim, who defended her title.

As in the previous year, Asada won the 2007–08 Japan Championships. Her final score was 1.15 points ahead of silver medalist and reigning World champion Miki Ando. Asada was placed on the Japanese team for both the World and Four Continents Championships. Before Four Continents, she split with Arutyunyan and returned to Japan to practice on the new Aurora Rink at Chukyo University, where she did not encounter with problems obtaining ice time.

Asada competed at both ISU Championships without a coach, but was accompanied by an official from the Japan Skating Federation. Competing for the first time at Four Continents Championships, Asada won both segments and finished 13.71 points ahead of silver medalist Joannie Rochette. In March 2008, at the Worlds Championships, Asada won her first World title. She was second in the short program, 0.18 behind Carolina Kostner. In the free skate, she was second to bronze medalist Yuna Kim by 1.92 points but 0.88 ahead of silver medalist Carolina Kostner.

=== 2008–09 season ===
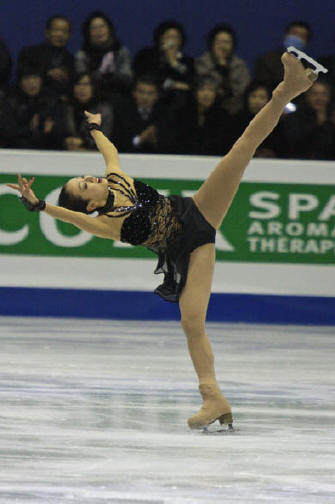
Asada performs a spiral during her free skate to Waltz from Masquerade at the 2008–09 Grand Prix Final.

In the summer of 2008, after leaving Arutyunyan, Asada returned to Russia, and was formally coached by Tarasova.

At the 2008 Trophée Eric Bompard, Asada placed second in both programs and finished second overall with a score of 167.59 points, 12.54 behind Joannie Rochette. Asada won gold at the 2008 NHK Trophy with 191.13 points, 23.49 ahead of the silver medalist Akiko Suzuki. She qualified for the 2008–09 Grand Prix Final. Asada won the free skating with 123.17 points and the competition overall with a total score of 188.55 points, defeating longtime rival Yuna Kim of South Korea. Asada made history in the free skate by becoming the first woman to land two triple Axels in the same program in an ISU competition, one in combination with a double toe loop.

At the 2008–09 Japan Championship, Asada was second behind Yukari Nakano in the short program. Asada landed three beautiful clean triple jumps in her free skate. Three other triple jumps were downgraded, including two triple Axels marked as under-rotated. She received 117.15 points for her free skating for a total of 182.45 points overall. Asada won her third straight national title after placing second in both the short program and the free skate.

Entering the 2009 Four Continents Championships in Vancouver, British Columbia, Canada as the defending champion, Asada placed 6th in the short program but won the free skate. Her first Axel attempt was popped into a single, but gracefully executed the second, garnering 8.80 points for the jump. She also completed a triple flip-double loop-double loop, a triple loop, and a triple flip-double loop. Asada placed third overall in the competition behind Joannie Rochette of Canada who won silver and Yuna Kim who won the gold.

At the 2009 World Championships, Asada placed third in the short program with 66.06 points and 4th in the free skate, where she scored 122.03 points. She finished in fourth place with a combined total score of 188.09 points.

At the inaugural 2009 World Team Trophy, she won both the short and free, finishing first overall in the ladies' event, with personal bests for the short program (75.84 points) and combined total (201.87) The Japanese team finished third overall at that event, behind the United States and Canada.

=== 2009–10 season ===
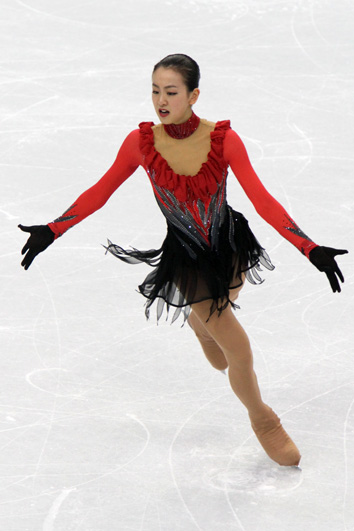
Asada performing her free skating to Bells of Moscow at the 2010 Winter Olympics.

Asada placed third in the short program and second in the free skating, finishing with the silver medal at 2009 Trophée Eric Bompard, 36.04 points behind gold medalist Yuna Kim. At the 2009 Rostelecom Cup, she placed 6th in the short and 5th in the free after landing just two triple jumps in her free skating. She finished 5th overall, 21.65 points behind gold medalist Miki Ando.

At the 2009–10 Japan Championships, Asada was first in both programs and won her fourth Japanese national title, 8.72 points ahead of silver medalist Akiko Suzuki.

At the 2010 Four Continents Championships, Asada placed third in the short program with 57.22 points after under-rotating her triple Axel, popping a triple flip and receiving a timing deduction of 1.00 point. She was first in the free skating with 126.74 points, 11.9 ahead of Akiko Suzuki, and won the gold medal with a total score of 183.96 points, 10.24 points ahead of Suzuki.

Due to Tarasova's health problems, Asada was coached mostly by her assistant, Shanetta Folle, in Nagoya, Japan; on 1 February 2010, Asada said that she had not been personally coached by Tarasova since the 2009 Rostelecom Cup in October. Tarasova was present with Asada at the 2010 Olympics but after the event, Asada chose to be based in her hometown, Nagoya, and parted ways with Tarasova.

From 23 to 25 February, Asada competed at the 2010 Winter Olympics. In the short program on 23 February, she executed a triple Axel-double toe loop, a triple flip and a double Axel and received level fours for all spins and spiral sequence. She scored 73.78 points and placed second in the short program. In her free skate on 25 February, she succeeded in landing two triple Axels, but under-rotated the first jump of a triple flip-double loop-double loop combination and popped a planned triple toe loop into a single. With 131.72 points from the free skating, Asada won the Olympic silver medal with a combined score of 205.50 points, 23.06 behind Yuna Kim of South Korea. She earned a Guinness World Record for the most triple Axels performed by a female skater in a competition – one in the short program and two in the free skating. Asada was Japan's flag-bearer at the closing ceremonies.

At the 2010 World Championships, Asada placed second in the short program with 68.08 points, 2.32 behind Mirai Nagasu of the United States. In her triple Axel-double toe loop combination, the Axel was downgraded to a double, but she executed a triple flip and a double Axel and received level fours on all her spins and spiral sequence. Asada reclaimed the world title with an overall score of 197.58 points. She became the first singles figure skater from Asia to win multiple world championship titles.

On 17 June 2010, Asada announced that her new jump coach was Hiroshi Nagakubo.

=== 2010–11 season ===
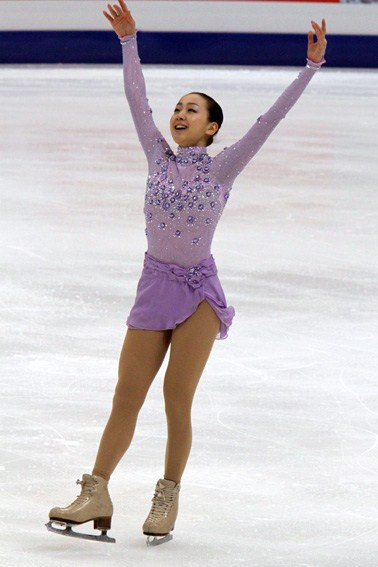
Asada performing her free skate to Liebesträume at the 2011 Four Continents Figure Skating Championships.

In September 2010, Nobuo Sato became Asada's new coach and Asada ended her relationship with coach Nagakubo.

After the Vancouver Olympics, Asada relearned all of her jumps from scratch to improve her technique. This contributed to her slump in the 2010–11 and 2011–12 seasons. Under the guidance of her new coach Nobuo Sato, she relearned all the takeoffs and landings for all her triple jumps, beginning with a single rotation. Despite reworking her jumps, Asada did not skip any competitions in the 2010–11 season.

Asada was assigned to the 2010 NHK Trophy and the 2010 Trophée Eric Bompard ISU Grand Prix events. At the 2010 NHK Trophy, Asada placed 8th in both programs and finished 8th overall with a total of 133.40 points. At the 2010 Trophée Eric Bompard, Asada placed 7th in the short program, 5th in the free skating and 5th overall, scoring a combined 148.02 points.

At the 2010–11 Japan national championships, Asada was first in the short program and second in the free skating. She obtained a total score of 193.69 points and placed second behind Miki Ando. At the 2011 Four Continents Championships, Asada placed second in both programs and won the silver medal with a score of 196.30 points, 5.04 points behind gold medalist Miki Ando. Her triple Axel jump in free skating was ratified for the first time since 2010 Worlds Championship, with +1.29 grade of execution. At the 2011 World Championships, Asada placed 7th in the short program, 6th in the free skating, and finished 6th overall with 172.79 points.

=== 2011–12 season ===
Asada began the 2011–12 season at the 2011 NHK Trophy. She placed third in the short program with 58.32 points and first in the free skating, earning a total of 184.45 points and the silver medal, 1.79 behind Akiko Suzuki. At the 2011 Cup of Russia, Asada placed first in the short program with 64.29 points. She earned a level four on her straight line step sequence with +1.30 GOE. She won the event and qualified for the 2011–12 Grand Prix Final. She withdrew from the Final due to her mother's serious illness. Her mother died of liver cirrhosis in Nagoya Hospital while Asada was flying back to Japan.

Placing second in both programs at the 2011–12 Japan Championships, Asada secured her fifth national title and qualified for the ISU Championships. First in the short program and second in the free, Asada won the silver medal at the 2012 Four Continents Championships behind gold medalist Ashley Wagner of the United States. At the 2012 World Championships, Asada placed fourth in the short program and sixth in the free skating, finishing sixth overall with 164.52 points.

After a disappointing sixth at the 2012 World Championships, her mother's death, and the challenges of reworking her jump technique, Asada considered not competing. Upon visiting her choreographer Lori Nichol in May 2012 for an exhibition number, Asada realized that she still liked skating and would continue competing.

=== 2012–13 season ===
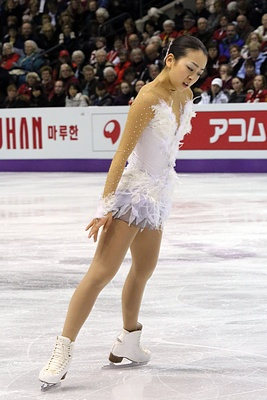
Asada performing her free skate to Swan Lake at the 2013 World Championships.

Asada began the 2012–13 season at the Japan Open, performing to Swan Lake. She won gold at her two Grand Prix events, the 2012 Cup of China and the 2012 NHK Trophy, qualifying her to the 2012–13 Grand Prix Final. Seven years after her triumph in Torino (Italy), and three years after her victory in Goyang City (Korea), Asada won her third title at the Grand Prix Final in Sochi (Russia), placing first in both the short program and free skating. Asada won her sixth national title at the 2012–13 Japan Championships.

At the 2013 Four Continents Championships, Asada placed first in the short program with a score of 74.49 points after landing her first triple Axel this season, together with triple flip–double loop combination and a triple loop. She also won the free skate with a score of 130.96, taking the gold medal with an overall score of 205.45 points, while teammates Akiko Suzuki and Kanako Murakami took the silver and bronze medals respectively. This was the second time that Japan had swept the Four Continents Championships' podium.

Asada returned to the World podium with a bronze medal finish at the 2013 World Championships with a personal best free skating score of 134.37. Asada placed fifth at the World Team Trophy and team Japan placed third.

=== 2013–14 season ===
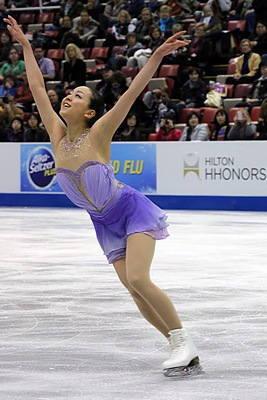
Asada performing her short program to Chopin Nocturne Op. 9, No. 2 at the 2013 Skate America.

Asada began the 2013–14 season at the Japan Open, performing to Rachmaninoff Piano Concerto No. 2. She won gold at her two Grand Prix assignments, the 2013 Skate America and the 2013 NHK Trophy. She became the first singles skater, male or female, to win all seven of the current events on the Grand Prix series. At NHK Trophy, she set personal best scores for the free skating and total score. She advanced to the 2013–14 Grand Prix of Figure Skating Final where she took her fourth Grand Prix Final title and became the first woman to complete two consecutive Grand Prix seasons undefeated. At all three Grand Prix events, she won by a margin of over ten points. In late December, Asada competed in the 2013–14 Japan Championships. She led after a strong short program, but only placed 3rd in the free skating, dropping to 3rd overall.

In the team event at the 2014 Winter Olympic Games, Asada skated the ladies' short program. She fell on the triple Axel and placed third individually; team Japan finished fifth. In the ladies' singles event, she placed 16th in the short program after falling on her triple Axel, underrotating a triple flip, and doubling a triple loop. After the unfortunate short program, many established figures in the figure skating community, including Michelle Kwan and Evgeni Plushenko, reached out to her and provided her with support for the free skate. Despite the overwhelming support from fans and members of the figure skating community, the former Japanese Prime Minister and Olympics chairman Yoshirō Mori criticized Asada for "always falling at the most critical time". During a press conference after Sochi, Asada was interviewed about her feelings regarding Mori's comments; she stated that it was in the past and that she has moved on. She rebounded in the free skating, landing 8 triple jumps (two underrotated) and earning a personal best score of 142.71, making her the third woman to score above the 140 mark after Kim Yuna's 2010 Olympics score and Yulia Lipnitskaya's 2014 Olympics team event score. This placed her third in the free skating and sixth overall. Asada's free skating was the most technically difficult of all the ladies and the only one with a triple Axel. This powerful performance solidified her status not only in Japanese sport, but at the Olympics; it was regarded by many as the single best performance of the ladies competition and the low program component score from Olympic judges was met with criticism.

At the 2014 World Championships, she broke the world record for the short program by scoring 78.66, 0.16 points higher than the former record set by Yuna Kim at the 2010 Winter Olympics. Asada went on to score 138.03 in the free skating, winning her third world title with a total of 216.69, a personal best for her. With this victory, she became the third woman in the last 45 years (along with Katarina Witt and Michelle Kwan) and the tenth woman to have won three world championship titles.

After winning the World Championship title, Asada stated that there was a 50–50 chance she would continue her career. On 19 May 2014, Asada announced she intended to skip the next season. Asada said she was mentally and physically tired and wanted a chance to focus on other aspects of her life, including attending university.

=== 2015–16 season ===
On 18 May 2015, Asada announced her intention to make comeback in competitive skating after having taken a one-year break. She had resumed training with coach Nobuo Sato with the aim of returning to competition. Her first competitive performance of the 2015–16 season was at the 2015 Japan Open, where she successfully landed her first triple Axel in over a year of competition absence, her first-place skate to Madama Butterfly led Team Japan to a first-place finish.

For the 2015–16 season Grand Prix series, Asada was assigned to compete at 2015 Cup of China and 2015 NHK Trophy. In the short program at the Cup of China, she landed her opening triple Axel and three additional triple jumps (one deemed under-rotated), one of the first women to try the maximum number of triple jumps in the short program. The next day during the free skate, she landed her opening triple Axel but had small errors on her remaining jumps. After winning the short program and placing third in the free skate, she won her first international competition upon returning. This victory extended her grand prix winning streak to eight, the longest in ladies single skating history. She went on to the 2015 NHK Trophy and won the bronze after several problems with her jumping passes. Asada's Grand Prix results qualified her to compete at the 2015–16 Grand Prix Final, where she finished sixth.

Asada went on to win bronze at the 2015–16 Japan Championships. She was selected to compete at both the 2016 Four Continents Championships and 2016 World Championships, though she opted to skip the former in order to focus on the latter. In April 2016, Asada stumbled on her opening triple Axel and the triple loop in the short program. The next day she performed a fantastic free skate, landing the triple Axel, triple flip triple loop combination, triple flip and double loop double loop combination in addition to three other jumping passes. Some of the jumps were deemed under-rotated, but the maturity in skating and the polished artistry was received with a standing ovation. She finish seventh at her final worlds event.

=== 2016–17 season ===
Asada began her season with a silver medal at the 2016 CS Finlandia Trophy, having finished second to Canada's Kaetlyn Osmond. Her first Grand Prix assignment was 2016 Skate America where she placed 6th. Her second assignment was the 2016 Trophee de France. She then placed 8th in the short program after underrotating her triple flip in combination with the double loop. She also failed to execute a triple-triple. She failed to execute a clean triple jump in the freeskate, placing 10th in that segment and 9th overall.

On 10 April 2017, Asada declared on her blog that she had retired from competition.

== Skating technique ==
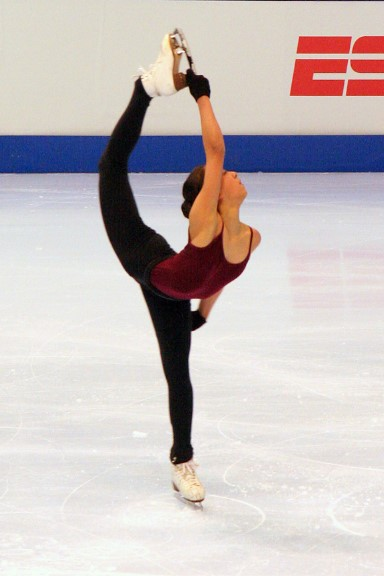
Asada performs a one-handed Biellmann spin at the 2006 Skate America practice.

Asada is known for her flexibility in spins and spirals. During her first two years on the international scene, Asada became known for her signature move, the cross-grab Biellmann position. She is also noted for performing the one-handed Biellmann spin in competition. She has received +2.60 grade of execution for her spiral sequence. Asada is also known for the complexity of her footwork sequence and has earned +2.00 grade of execution.

Asada landed her first 3A at the age of 12, and she became the first lady to perform a triple-triple-triple combination in national competition – she completed a 3F-3Lo-3T combination. At the age of 14, Asada landed a 3A in her free skating at the 2004–05 Junior Grand Prix Final, held in December 2004 in Helsinki, Finland, becoming the first junior girl to do one in an international event. She has since been known for her 3A jumps.

Starting with the 2007–08 season, criteria for judging jump take-off and landing technique became more rigorous, and Asada was penalized for underrotations and change-of-edge errors on her Lutz jump.

Asada did not include salchow jumps in her junior and senior career programs until 2008. She had stated previously that the triple salchow was the first triple jump she had ever landed and that she did not have a problem landing it cleanly, but she was not comfortable using the jump in competition because it is one of her least favorite jumps. Asada added the triple salchow to her free skate at the 2008 NHK Trophy and 2008–09 Grand Prix Final.

Normally, Asada uses a 3Lo as her second jump in a combination, typically after the 3F. However, she added the toe loop to her free skate as the second jump of her first triple-triple combination during the 2004–05 season, a 3F-3T. In the 2006–07 season she used the 2A-3T, while in the 2007–08 season she performed the 3F-3T again.

In the 2008–09 season, she executed the 3A-2T combination in international competition, first getting full credit for it at the 2008–09 Grand Prix Final. At that same competition, Asada became the first female skater to land two 3A in the same program. She became the first lady to land 3 triple Axels in the same competition (1 in the short, 2 in the long). She also has a Guinness World Record for the most triple Axels performed by a female skater in competition.

After finishing second in 2010 Winter Olympics, Asada decided to rework her jumps. The goal was a more fluid jump technique, achieved by adding speed to the approach run to increase the height of the jump and the speed of spins. Asada also corrected her habit of moving her shoulders up and down before jumping. The reworking process set her back for two seasons. Asada found that her jumping began to suffer and she was making mistakes on all her jumps. During the 2012–13 season, her performance improved and she maintained a winning streak. Her component score, which had mostly remained in the 7 range, edged above 8. By the 2013–14 season, Asada said, "every single one of my skating techniques had been changed." In 2014 Winter Olympics Ladies Free Skating event, Asada executed all six triple jumps.

Asada has been known to practice and land quadruple jumps in training. She credits training alongside Takahiko Kozuka for improving her spins. The number of rotations she achieves with one kick increased from 30 to 104.

== Records and achievements ==
Record scores:

- Former world record holder for the ladies' short program score (78.66), set at the 2014 World Championships on 27 March 2014. Record was broken in 2016 during the Grand Prix Final by Evgenia Medvedeva.
- Second woman to score over 200 points for the total score under the ISU Judging System.
- Third woman to score over 140 points for the free skate score under the ISU Judging System.
- Former world record holder for the ladies' free skating score (133.13), set at the 2007 World Championships on 24 March 2007. Record was broken eight months later on 24 November 2007 by Yuna Kim (South Korea).
- Former world record holder for the ladies' combined total score (199.52), set at the 2006 NHK Trophy on 2 December 2006. Record was broken two years later on 28 March 2009 by Yuna Kim (South Korea).
- Former world record holder for the junior ladies' free skating score (119.13), set at the 2005 World Junior Championships on 3 March 2005. Record was broken six and a half years later on 9 October 2011 by Yulia Lipnitskaya (Russia).
- Former world record holder for the junior ladies' combined total score (179.24), set at the 2005 World Junior Championships on 3 March 2005. Record was broken six and a half years later on 9 October 2011 by Yulia Lipnitskaya (Russia).

Triple Axel:

- The oldest (26 years old) woman to land a triple Axel in international competition.
- Fifth woman to land the triple Axel jump in international competition 2004-2005 Junior Grand Prix.
- First junior girl to land the triple Axel jump in international competition 2004-2005 Junior Grand Prix.
- First woman to land the triple Axel jump at the World Junior Championships.
- First woman to land three triple Axel jumps in one competition Figure skating at the 2010 Winter Olympics – Ladies' singles.
- First woman to land a triple Axel in the short program at the Winter Olympics.
- First woman to land the triple Axel in multiple Olympics.
- Second woman to land a triple Axel at the Winter Olympics.
- First woman to land two triple Axel jumps in the same program 2008-2009 Grand Prix Final.
- Currently holds the record for most triple Axels landed in international competition by a woman.

Other:

- First figure skater in a singles discipline from Asia to win multiple world championships.
- First Japanese figure skater in any discipline to win multiple world championships.
- First singles figure skater to win all seven of the current events on the Grand Prix circuit.
- First woman to complete two consecutive Grand Prix seasons undefeated.
- First and currently only female figure skater to achieve triple Career Grand Slams. Tied with Evgeni Plushenko for the most Career Grand Slams achieved by single skaters.
- First non-European woman to receive the Career Grand Slam.
- First non-European woman to receive two Career Grand Slams.
- Youngest non-European woman to receive the Career Grand Slam, age 17.
- Oldest non-European woman to receive the Career Grand Slam, age 23.
- Holds 15 Grand Prix series titles – the third-most titles in history behind Evgeni Plushenko and Irina Slutskaya.
- Holds 8 consecutive Grand Prix circuit victories – longest streak of any woman in history.
- Tied with Irina Slutskaya for the most Grand Prix Final titles won by a woman.
- Tied with Fumie Suguri for the most Four Continents Championships titles won by a woman.
- The only woman to have landed five Axel jumps in the same Olympic competition.

=== List of Asada's world record scores ===
Combined total records
Date	Score	Event	Note
2 December 2006	199.52	2006 NHK Trophy	The record was broken by Yuna Kim on 28 March 2009.
Short program records
Date	Score	Event	Note
27 March 2014	78.66	2014 World Championships	The record was broken by Evgenia Medvedeva on 9 December 2016.
Free skating records
Date	Score	Event	Note
24 March 2007	133.13	2007 World Championships	The record was broken by Yuna Kim on 24 November 2007.
Junior ladies' Combined total records
Date	Score	Event	Note
6 March 2005	179.24	2005 World Junior Championships	The record was broken by Yulia Lipnitskaya on 9 October 2011.
5 December 2004	172.83	2004–05 Junior Grand Prix Final	
Junior ladies' short program records
Date	Score	Event	Note
5 March 2005	60.11	2005 World Junior Championships	The record was broken by Yuna Kim on 11 March 2006.
4 December 2004	57.91	2004–05 Junior Grand Prix Final	
30 September 2004	56.24	2004–05 ISU Junior Grand Prix, Ukraine	
Junior ladies' free skating records
Date	Score	Event	Note
6 March 2005	119.13	2005 World Junior Championships	The record was broken by Yulia Lipnitskaya on 9 October 2011.
5 December 2004	114.92	2004–05 Junior Grand Prix Final	

== Public life and endorsements ==
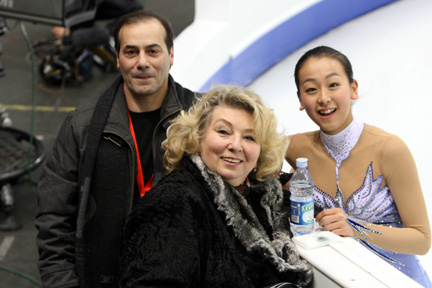
Rafael Arutyunyan, Tatiana Tarasova, and Mao Asada at the 2007–08 Grand Prix Final

Asada is very popular in Japan and is credited with increasing the popularity of figure skating in Japan. Since gaining national attention while still on the junior circuit, she is a household name in Japan, known by the affectionate nickname "Mao-chan". During the 2014 Winter Olympics, Asada became the most discussed and mentioned athlete of the Olympics on the social networking website Twitter, ahead of Yuna Kim, ice hockey player T. J. Oshie, and snowboarder Shaun White.

Asada headlines her own exhibition show called "The Ice", which began in the summer of 2008, with her sister Mai Asada. Her skating music was compiled on two albums by EMI Music Japan: Mai & Mao Asada Skating Music and Mai & Mao Asada Skating Music 2008–09. The Asada sisters have also been named as goodwill ambassadors to Canada.

In 2011, Asada launched her own kimono brand named MaoMao. In January 2012, Asada cancelled the release of a book on her skating career; she stated, "The way the book was advertised was different from what I had in mind."

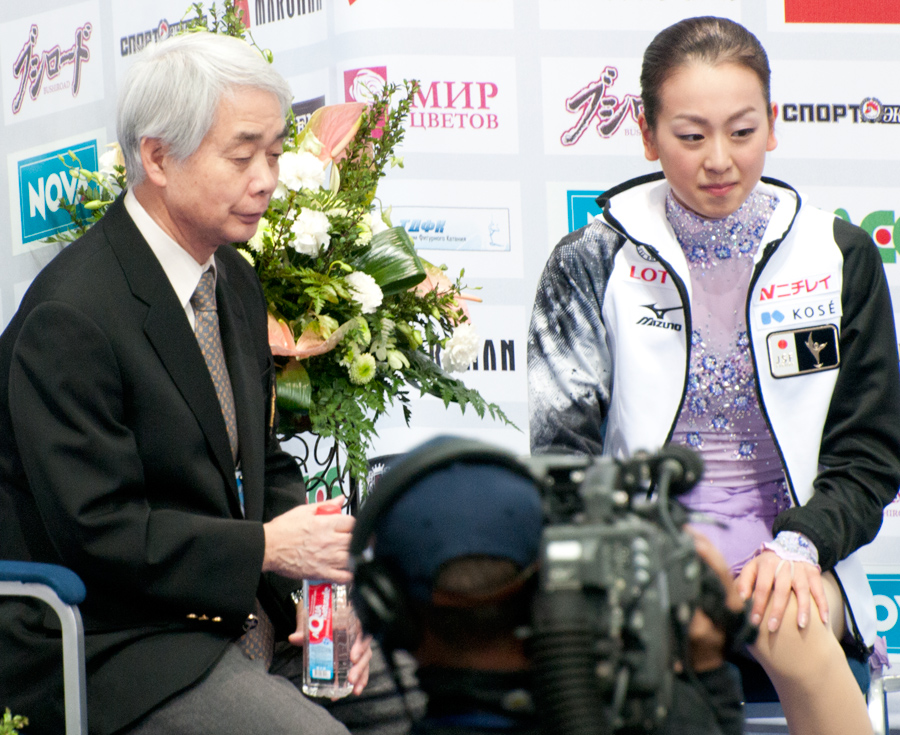
Coach Nobuo Sato (left) and Mao Asada (right) at the 2011 Cup of Russia

Asada has appeared in many variety television shows and in commercials. She and her dog Aero, named after Aero chocolates, have been featured in chocolate commercials in Japan. Asada has been sponsored by Coca-Cola, Itoham Foods, Kao ("Asience"), Lotte, Nestlé, Oji Paper Company ("Nepia"), Olympus Corporation, Omron, and Weider. Her current sponsors include Airweave, Arsoa, Japan Airlines, Kuriyama Holdings, MiO, Morinaga & Company, Sato Pharmaceutical, Sumitomo Life, Toho Gas, and Triple Yogurt. On 25 December 2013, Japan Airlines unveiled a new Boeing 777–300 (JA8942) with a special Mao Asada livery to promote Japan's participation in the 2014 Winter Olympics in Sochi, Russia.

During the 2010 Winter Olympics, a popular Vancouver Japanese street food vendor, Japadog, named a hot dog after Asada called the Mao Dog. Similarly, a local sushi store created a sushi roll and named it the Mao Roll after Asada. After Asada's silver medal win, Japanese dollmaker Kyugetsu created a Mao Asada hina doll in celebration of her efforts. In December 2013, chrysanthemum farmers in the Ryukyu Islands named a new crop of chrysanthemums "Mao Orange" after the colour of Asada's short program dress from the 2012–13 season.

On 8 April 2014, Asada's exhibition named "Smile" opened at Takashimaya department store in Tokyo's Nihonbashi district. This drew more than 10,000 visitors on its first day, outperforming every other event opening at the establishment for the past 10 years. In just nine days, it hit more than 100,000 visitors, the shortest period to reach the milestone in Takashimaya's history. The exhibition includes a collection of 30 costumes that were worn by Asada and a display of medals she has won over the years, among them the silver she scooped up at the 2010 Vancouver Winter Olympics.

On 5 July 2014, Asada debuted as a reporter for the long-running travel program "Sekai Fushigi Hakken!" by TBS. For this documentary, she traveled to Austria, Slovakia and Hungary for eight days to find the origin of figure skating. In March 2015, Asada made her debut as DJ host for her weekly radio show program "Mao Asada's Nippon Smile". This program was sponsored by Sumitomo Life Insurance Ltd. Co. and aired in TBS radio from March 2015 to June 2015.

She is a fan of Japanese pop star Ayumi Hamasaki, and was seen congratulating her on her 10th Anniversary.

French Olympic Medalist figure skater Philippe Candeloro calls himself Mao Asada's godfather.

== Mao Asada Thanks Tour ==
"Mao Thanks Tour" (浅田真央サンクスツアー) was founded by Mao Asada in 2018, soon after her retirement, to express gratitude to the fans for their love and support. She became the producer, the director and the main star of the project. In her column for Number, Asada named it "the second stage of my skating life".

It was a special 80-minute ice show centered around Asada and her memorable programs. The choreography was updated in many of them, and the music was rearranged. Some programs were recreated from scratch but kept the original atmosphere with recognizable details.

There were 10 members on cast including Mao, her sister Mai Asada (in 2018), Takahito Mura, Sei Kawahara, and Haruka Imai (she joined the tour in 2019 to replace Mai who could not stay with them because of her TV work). Six skaters came to the auditions and were hired by Asada in spite of being nowhere near to an elite status. Two had retired years ago, unknown to the general public. Four were students, one from Mongolia, one from Spain, with zero experience in shows. Discussing her choice, Asada explained that she wanted to give a chance to those who loved figure skating but had to quit early, due to injuries and unlucky circumstances.

Her approach was the opposite to a typical ice show concept of attracting the audience by famous names. It also meant a larger amount of work for everyone. Asada herself skated 10 programs out of 18. Mura and Imai had their own solo parts too, and each performer appeared on ice at least 6–7 times in group numbers. That was a challenge but, as Mura stated, it made them all really involved and willing to do their bests.

Another challenge was to lower prices for tickets (usually way too expensive) so that more people could afford them. Asada and her team managed to do it performing at small arenas with permanent ice, a strategy that helped to reduce the set-up time and costs. Visiting small towns as well as big cities made the show available all around the country. On the other hand, they were not saving on the visual side so the lighting and costumes were of high quality.

The tour began on 3 May 2018 in Niigata, and ended on 27 April 2021 in Yokohama. At the start it was planned to hold 10 performances nationwide. However, the response of the audience was so strong that they continued to add more and more locations, taking new invitations that followed. The official website of the tour had a special map showing their journey in progress. As a result, within 4 years Mao Thanks Tour visited all the 47 prefectures of Japan and held 202 performances.

== Programs ==
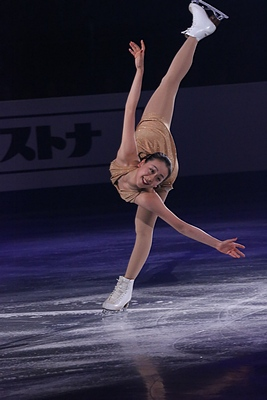
Asada does an arabesque spiral during her exhibition program "Smile" at the 2013–14 Grand Prix Final.

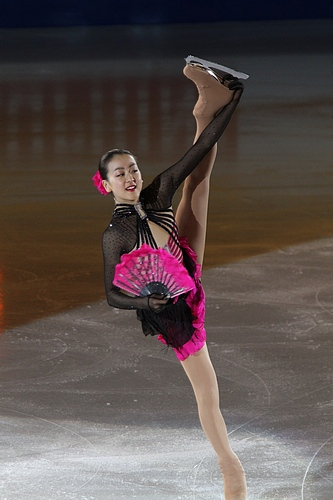
Asada does a Y spiral during her exhibition program Caprice No. 24 at the 2010 World Championships.

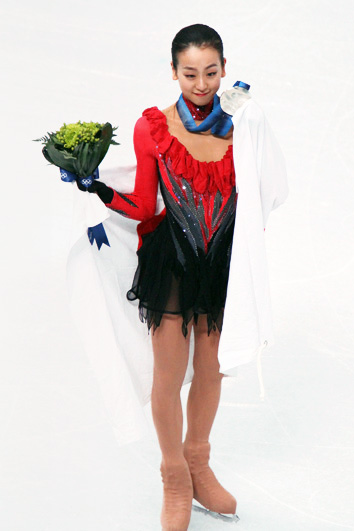
Asada at the 2010 Winter Olympics medal ceremony

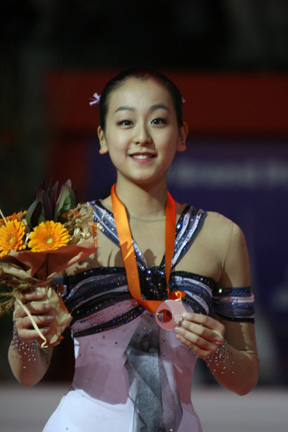
Asada at the 2007–08 Grand Prix Final medal ceremony.

Season	Short program	Free skating	Exhibition
2016–17	Ritual Fire Dance by Arthur Rubinstein choreo. by Lori Nichol	En la cueva – La noche; Pantomime; El aparecido (from El amor brujo) by Manuel de Falla; Ritual Fire Dance by Arthur Rubinstein choreo. by Lori Nichol	Cello Suites by Johann Sebastian Bach choreo. by Lori Nichol
2015–16	Bei Mir Bistu Shein by Sholom Secunda performed by Janis Siegel choreo. by Lori Nichol	Madama Butterfly by Giacomo Puccini choreo. by Lori Nichol	Puttin' On the Ritz by Irving Berlin performed by Fred Astaire choreo. by Lori Nichol
2014–15	Did not compete this season		This Little Light of Mine by Harry Dixon Loes performed by Yo-Yo Ma and Amelia Zirin-Brown choreo. by Lori Nichol
2013–14	Nocturne Op. 9, No. 2 in E-flat major by Frédéric Chopin choreo. by Lori Nichol	Piano Concerto No. 2 by Sergei Rachmaninoff choreo. by Tatiana Tarasova	Smile; What a Wonderful World performed by Ima choreo. by Lori Nichol
2012–13	I Got Rhythm by George Gershwin choreo. by Lori Nichol	Swan Lake by Pyotr Ilyich Tchaikovsky choreo. by Tatiana Tarasova	Mary Poppins choreo. by Lori Nichol
2011–12	Scheherazade by Nikolai Rimsky-Korsakov choreo. by Tatiana Tarasova	Liebesträume by Franz Liszt choreo. by Lori Nichol	I Vow to Thee, My Country by Libera choreo. by Lori Nichol; Waltz in C-sharp minor, Op. 64, No. 2 by Frédéric Chopin choreo. by Tatiana Tarasova
2010–11	Tango (from Agony) by Alfred Schnittke choreo. by Tatiana Tarasova	Liebesträume by Franz Liszt choreo. by Lori Nichol	Ballade No. 1 in G minor, Op. 23, CT. 2 by Frédéric Chopin choreo. by Tatiana Tarasova
2009–10	Waltz from Masquerade Suite by Aram Khachaturian choreo. by Tatiana Tarasova	Prelude in C-sharp minor by Sergei Rachmaninoff choreo. by Tatiana Tarasova	Caprice No. 24 by Niccolò Paganini choreo. by Tatiana Tarasova
2008–09	Claire de Lune by Claude Debussy choreo. by Lori Nichol	Waltz from Masquerade Suite by Aram Khachaturian choreo. by Tatiana Tarasova	Por una cabeza (from Scent of a Woman) by Carlos Gardel, Alfredo Le Pera; Payadora by Julián Plaza choreo. by Tatiana Tarasova; Sing, Sing, Sing by Louis Prima choreo. by Lori Nichol
2007–08	Fantasia for Violin and Orchestra (from Ladies in Lavender) by Nigel Hess performed by Joshua Bell choreo. by Tatiana Tarasova	Fantaisie-Impromptu by Frédéric Chopin choreo. by Lori Nichol	So Deep Is The Night Étude Op. 10, No. 3 by Frédéric Chopin vocals by Lesley Garrett choreo. by Lori Nichol
2006–07	Nocturne Op. 9, No. 2 in E-flat major by Frédéric Chopin choreo. by Lori Nichol	Csárdás by Vittorio Monti choreo. by Lori Nichol	Habanera (from Carmen) by Georges Bizet vocal by Filippa Giordano choreo. by Lori Nichol
2005–06	Carmen by Georges Bizet choreo. by Machiko Yamada, Mihoko Higuchi	The Nutcracker by Pyotr Ilyich Tchaikovsky choreo. by Lori Nichol	Over the Rainbow by Harold Arlen vocal by Eva Cassidy choreo. by Lori Nichol
2004–05	Over the Rainbow by Harold Arlen choreo. by Lea Ann Miller	La Boutique Fantastique by Gioachino Rossini, Ottorino Respighi choreo. by Lea Ann Miller	Pick Yourself Up by Natalie Cole choreo. by Machiko Yamada, Mihoko Higuchi
2003–04	Orchestral Suite (from My Girl 2) by Cliff Eidelman choreo. by Machiko Yamada, Mihoko Higuchi	Waltz-Scherzo in C major, Op. 34 by Pyotr Ilyich Tchaikovsky choreo. by Machiko Yamada, Mihoko Higuchi	Habanera (from Carmen) by Georges Bizet choreo. by Machiko Yamada, Mihoko Higuchi
2002–03	Say Hey Kids choreo. by Machiko Yamada, Mihoko Higuchi	Inca Dance and Andes by Cusco choreo. by Machiko Yamada, Mihoko Higuchi	

== Competitive highlights ==
- GP: Grand Prix; CS: Challenger Series; JGP: Junior Grand Prix

International
Event	01–02	02–03	03–04	04–05	05–06	06–07	07–08	08–09	09–10	10–11	11–12	12–13	13–14	14–15	15–16	16–17
Olympics									2nd				6th			
Worlds						2nd	1st	4th	1st	6th	6th	3rd	1st		7th	
Four Continents							1st	3rd	1st	2nd	2nd	1st				
GP Final					1st	2nd	2nd	1st			WD	1st	1st		6th	
GP France					1st		1st	2nd	2nd	5th						9th
GP Cup of China					2nd							1st			1st	
GP NHK Trophy						1st		1st		8th	2nd	1st	1st		3rd	
GP Rostelecom Cup									5th		1st					
GP Skate Canada							1st									
GP Skate America						3rd							1st			6th
CS Finlandia																2nd
International: Junior
Junior Worlds				1st	2nd											
JGP Final				1st												
JGP Ukraine				1st												
JGP U.S.				1st												
National
Japan Champs.		7th	8th	2nd	2nd	1st	1st	1st	1st	2nd	1st	1st	3rd		3rd	12th
Japan Junior Champs.	6th	4th	4th	1st												
Team events
Olympics													5th T 3rd P			
World Team; Trophy								3rd T 1st P				3rd T 5th P				
Japan Open					1st T 1st P	1st T 4th P	1st T 1st P		3rd T 3rd P	1st T 5th P		1st T 2nd P	1st T 1st P		1st T 1st P	
WD = Withdrew; T = Team result; P = Personal result. Medals awarded for team result only.

== Detailed results ==
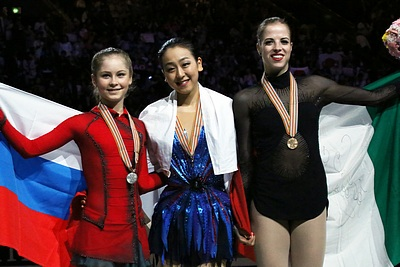
Asada (center) on the podium at the 2014 World Championships

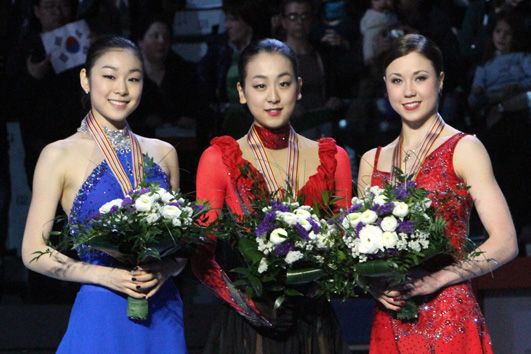
Asada (center) on the podium at the 2010 World Championships

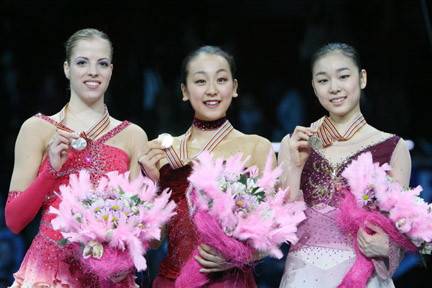
Asada (center) on the podium at the 2008 World Championships

Small medals for short program and free skating awarded only at ISU Championships. At team events, medals awarded for team results only.

- **^team event** – This is a team event; medals are awarded for the team results only.
  - **^T** – team result
  - **^P** – personal/individual result
- World records highlighted in **bold and italic**
- Personal bests highlighted in **bold**
- ISU seasons' bests highlighted in italic

=== 2006–present ===
2016–17 season
Date	Event	SP	FS	Total
22–25 December 2016	2016–17 Japan Championships	8; 60.32	12; 114.10	12; 174.42
11–13 November 2016	2016 Trophée de France	8; 61.29	10; 100.10	9; 161.39
21–23 October 2016	2016 Skate America	5; 64.47	6; 112.31	6; 176.78
6–10 October 2016	2016 CS Finlandia Trophy	2; 64.87	2; 121.29	2; 186.16
2015–16 season
Date	Event	SP	FS	Total
28 March – 3 April 2016	2016 World Championships	9; 65.87	7; 134.43	7; 200.30
24–27 December 2015	2015–16 Japan Championships	5; 62.03	2; 131.72	3; 193.75
10–13 December 2015	2015–16 Grand Prix Final	3; 69.13	6; 125.19	6; 194.32
27–29 November 2015	2015 NHK Trophy	4; 62.50	2; 120.49	3; 182.99
6–8 November 2015	2015 Cup of China	1; 71.73	3; 125.75	1; 197.48
3 October 2015	2015 Japan Open ^{team event}	–	1; 141.70	1^{T}
2013–14 season
Date	Event	SP	FS	Total
24–30 March 2014	2014 World Championships	1; **78.66**	1; 138.03	1; **216.69**
19–20 February 2014	2014 Winter Olympics	16; 55.51	3; **142.71**	6; 198.22
6–9 February 2014	2014 Winter Olympics ^{team event}	3; 64.07	–	5^{T}
20–23 December 2013	2013–14 Japan Championships	1; 73.01	3; 126.49	3; 199.50
5–8 December 2013	2013–14 Grand Prix Final	1; 72.36	1; 131.66	1; 204.02
8–10 November 2013	2013 NHK Trophy	1; 71.26	1; 136.33	1; 207.59
18–20 October 2013	2013 Skate America	1; 73.18	1; 131.37	1; 204.55
5 October 2013	2013 Japan Open ^{team event}	–	1; 135.16	1^{T}
2012–13 season
Date	Event	SP	FS	Total
11–14 April 2013	2013 ISU World Team Trophy ^{team event}	5; 59.39	5; 117.97	3^{T} / 5^{P} 177.36
10–17 March 2013	2013 World Championships	6; 62.10	2; 134.37	3; 196.47
6–11 February 2013	2013 Four Continents Championships	1; 74.49	1; 130.96	1; 205.45
20–24 December 2012	2012–13 Japan Championships	2; 62.81	1; 130.75	1; 193.56
6–9 December 2012	2012–13 Grand Prix Final	1; 66.96	1; 129.84	1; 196.80
23–25 November 2012	2012 NHK Trophy	1; 67.95	2; 117.32	1; 185.27
2–4 November 2012	2012 Cup of China	2; 62.89	1; 118.87	1; 181.76
6 October 2012	2012 Japan Open ^{team event}	–	2; 122.04	1^{T}
2011–12 season
Date	Event	SP	FS	Total
26–31 March 2012	2012 World Championships	4; 59.49	6; 105.03	6; 164.52
7–12 February 2012	2012 Four Continents Championships	1; 64.25	2; 124.37	2; 188.62
22–26 December 2011	2011–12 Japan Championships	2; 65.40	2; 118.67	1; 184.07
24–27 November 2011	2011 Rostelecom Cup	1; 64.29	1; 118.96	1; 183.25
11–13 November 2011	2011 NHK Trophy	3; 58.42	1; 125.77	2; 184.19
2010–11 season
Date	Event	SP	FS	Total
24 April – 1 May 2011	2011 World Championships	7; 58.66	6; 114.13	6; 172.79
15–20 February 2011	2011 Four Continents Championships	2; 63.41	2; 132.89	2; 196.30
23–26 December 2010	2010–11 Japan Championships	1; 66.22	2; 127.47	2; 193.69
26–28 November 2010	2010 Trophée Éric Bompard	7; 50.10	5; 97.92	5; 148.02
22–24 October 2010	2010 NHK Trophy	8; 47.95	8; 85.45	8; 133.40
2 October 2010	2010 Japan Open ^{team event}	–	5; 92.44	1^{T}
2009–10 season
Date	Event	SP	FS	Total
22–28 March 2010	2010 World Championships	2; 68.08	2; 129.50	1; 197.58
14–27 February 2010	2010 Winter Olympics	2; 73.78	2; 131.72	2; 205.50
25–31 January 2010	2010 Four Continents Championships	3; 57.22	1; 126.74	1; 183.96
25–27 December 2009	2009–10 Japan Championships	1; 69.12	1; 135.50	1; 204.62
22–25 October 2009	2009 Rostelecom Cup	6; 51.94	5; 98.34	5; 150.28
15–18 October 2009	2009 Trophée Éric Bompard	3; 58.96	2; 115.03	2; 173.99
3 October 2009	2009 Japan Open ^{team event}	–	3; 102.94	3^{T}
2008–09 season
Date	Event	SP	FS	Total
15–19 April 2009	2009 ISU World Team Trophy ^{team event}	1; 75.84	1; 126.03	3^{T} / 1^{P} 201.87
23–29 March 2009	2009 World Championships	3; 66.06	4; 122.03	4; 188.09
4–8 February 2009	2009 Four Continents Championships	6; 57.86	1; 118.66	3; 176.52
25–27 December 2008	2008–09 Japan Championships	2; 65.30	2; 117.15	1; 182.45
11–14 December 2008	2008–09 Grand Prix Final	2; 65.38	1; 123.17	1; 188.55
27–30 November 2008	2008 NHK Trophy	1; 64.64	1; 126.49	1; 191.13
13–16 November 2008	2008 Trophée Éric Bompard	2; 58.12	2; 109.47	2; 167.59
2007–08 season
Date	Event	SP	FS	Total
20 April 2008	2008 Japan Open ^{team event}	–	1; 128.03	1^{T}
17–23 March 2008	2008 World Championships	2; 64.10	2; 121.46	1; 185.56
13–17 February 2008	2008 Four Continents Championships	1; 60.94	1; 132.31	1; 193.25
26–28 December 2007	2007–08 Japan Championships	1; 72.92	2; 132.41	1; 205.33
13–16 December 2007	2007–08 Grand Prix Final	6; 59.04	1; 132.55	2; 191.59
15–18 November 2007	2007 Trophée Éric Bompard	1; 56.90	1; 122.90	1; 179.80
1–4 November 2007	2007 Skate Canada International	3; 58.08	1; 119.58	1; 177.66
2006–07 season
Date	Event	SP	FS	Total
29 April 2007	2007 Japan Open ^{team event}	–	4; 101.47	1^{T}
19–25 March 2007	2007 World Championships	5; 61.32	1; **133.13**	2; 194.45
27–29 December 2006	2006–07 Japan Championships	1; 71.14	1; 140.62	1; 211.76
14–17 December 2006	2006–07 Grand Prix Final	1; 69.34	4; 103.18	2; 172.52
30 November – 3 December 2006	2006 NHK Trophy	1; 69.50	1; 130.02	1; **199.52**
26–29 October 2006	2006 Skate America	1; 68.84	4; 102.39	3; 171.23

=== 2003–2006 ===
2005–06 season
Date	Event	Level	QR	SP	FS	Total
14 March 2006	2006 Japan Open ^{team event}	Senior	–	–	1; 125.72	1^{T}
6–12 March 2006	2006 World Junior Championships	Junior	1; 113.58	2; 56.10	2; 97.25	2; 153.35
23–25 December 2005	2005–06 Japan Championships	Senior	–	3; 66.64	3; 121.46	2; 188.10
16–18 December 2005	2005–06 Grand Prix Final	Senior	–	1; 64.38	1; 125.24	1; 189.62
17–20 November 2005	2005 Trophée Éric Bompard	Senior	–	1; 63.96	1; 118.46	1; 182.42
2–6 November 2005	2005 Cup of China	Senior	–	2; 62.92	3; 113.68	2; 176.60
2004–05 season
Date	Event	Level	QR	SP	FS	Total
26 February – 3 March 2005	2005 World Junior Championships	Junior	1; 112.32	1; 60.11	1; 119.13	1; 179.24
24–26 December 2004	2004–05 Japan Championships	Senior	–	4; 60.46	2; 106.36	2; 166.82
2–5 December 2004	2004–05 ISU Junior Grand Prix Final	Junior	–	1; 57.91	1; 114.92	1; 172.83
29 September – 3 October 2004	2004–05 ISU Junior Grand Prix, Ukraine	Junior	–	1; 56.24	1; 86.75	1; 142.99
9–12 September 2004	2004–05 ISU Junior Grand Prix, USA	Junior	–	1; 50.14	1; 87.88	1; 138.02
2003–04 season
Date	Event	Level	TFP	SP	FS	Total
10–13 March 2004	2004 Mladost Trophy	Novice	1.5	1	1	1
2–5 December 2003	2003 Helena Pajovic Cup	Novice	2.0	2	1	1
