= Aichi Toho University =

University in Japan

- 愛知東邦大学
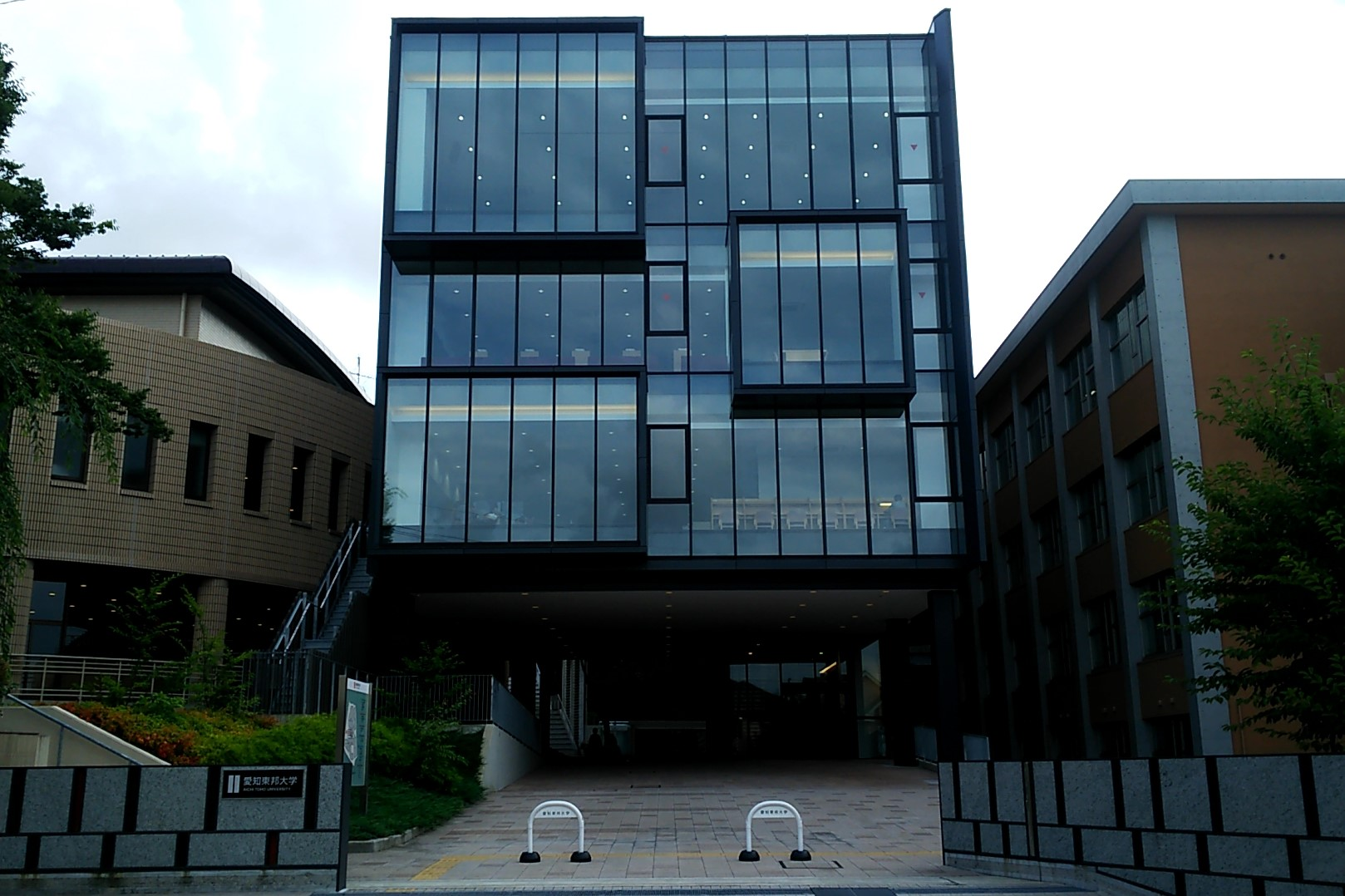
- L building of Aichi Toho University
- Type: Private
- Established: 2001
- Location: Meitō-ku, Nagoya, Japan; 35.1701°N 136.9869°E
- Website: www.aichi-toho.ac.jp

Aichi Toho University (愛知東邦大学, Aichi tōhō daigaku) is a private university in Meitō-ku, Nagoya, Aichi Prefecture, Japan. The predecessor of the school was founded in 2001. The present name was adopted in 2007. In 1990, the school signed an agreement for a "sister college relationship" with Everett Community College in Washington State.
