= Fujigaoka, Nagoya =

Coordinates: 35.1822°N 137.022°E

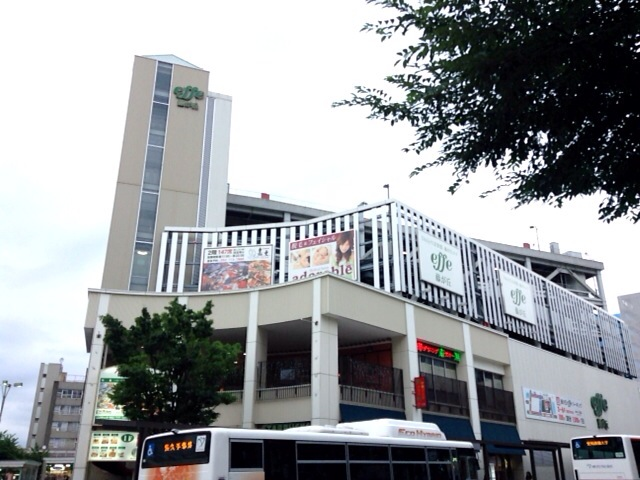
Fujigaoka effe 20130907

Fujigaoka (藤が丘) is a new town in Meito-Ku ward, Nagoya, Japan. Fujigaoka means literally Wisteria Hill. The town has 400 Cherry Blossom trees lining the streets and is famous for its Blossoms and Festival in April. The town is relatively new, having been largely populated in the last 30 years. For this reason, the inhabitants include a large number of people from outside Nagoya, leading to a local accent that is less colloquial than the more traditional Nagoya dialect.

It benefits from a major hospital, schools and is the location of the Fujigaoka Station on the Higashiyama Line of the Nagoya Subway. The area around the station is known for its convenience. There are four supermarkets within walking distance and "izakaya"/restaurants near the station area. Subway passengers can transfer to the Linimo line, which is another modern rail system that was originally built for the 2005 World Expo. The rail is not part of the Nagoya subway system and travels further east.

The town celebrates its festival every year on the first Saturday and Sunday of April, with public displays of dancing and street entertainment, and a street market amongst other things.
