= Cup of China =

International figure skating competition

- Status: Active
- Genre: Grand Prix competition
- Frequency: Annual
- Country: China
- Inaugurated: 2003
- Previous event: 2026 Cup of China
- Next event: 2027 Cup of China
- Organizer: Chinese Skating Association

The Cup of China is an annual figure skating competition sanctioned by the International Skating Union (ISU), organized and hosted by the Chinese Skating Association (simplified Chinese: 中国滑冰协会; traditional Chinese: 中國滑冰協會), and part of the ISU Grand Prix Series. The first competition was held in 2003 in Beijing as a replacement for the Bofrost Cup on Ice. The Cup of China has been interrupted three times in its history: in 2018 when the Chinese Skating Association elected to forgo hosting any international skating events in order to prepare its venues for the 2022 Winter Olympics, and then in 2021 and 2022 due to the COVID-19 pandemic.

Medals are awarded in men's singles, women's singles, pair skating, and ice dance. Skaters earn points based on their results at the qualifying competitions each season, and the top skaters or teams in each discipline are invited to then compete at the Grand Prix of Figure Skating Final. Three skaters are tied for winning the most titles in men's singles (with two each): Jeremy Abbott of the United States, Jin Boyang of China, and Shun Sato of Japan. Four skaters are tied for winning the most titles in women's singles (also with two each): Mao Asada of Japan, Amber Glenn of the United States, Irina Slutskaya of Russia, and Yuna Kim of South Korea. Shen Xue and Zhao Hongbo hold the record for winning the most titles in pair skating (with four); while Nathalie Péchalat and Fabian Bourzat of France, and Tanith Belbin and Benjamin Agosto of the United States, are tied for winning the most titles in ice dance (with three each).

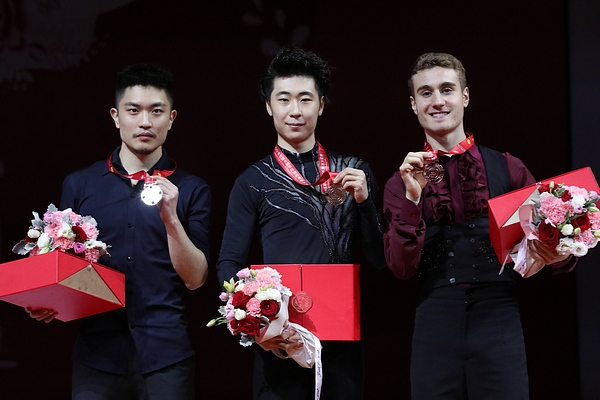
The gold, silver, and bronze medalists in the men's event in 2019: Jin Boyang of China (center), Yan Han of China (left), and Matteo Rizzo of Italy (right)

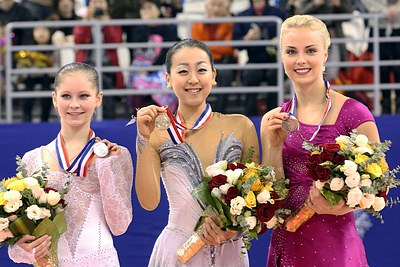
The gold, silver, and bronze medalists in the women's event in 2012: Mao Asada of Japan (center), Yulia Lipnitskaya of Russia (left), and Kiira Korpi of Finland (right)

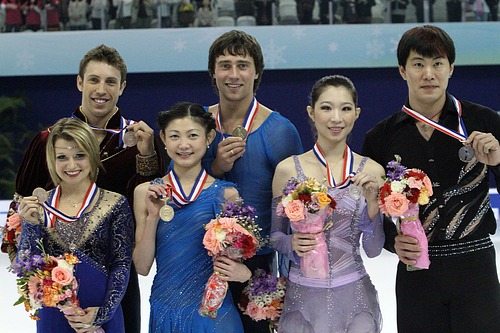
The gold, silver, and bronze medalists in the pairs event in 2011: Yuko Kavaguti and Alexander Smirnov of Russia (center), Zhang Dan and Zhang Hao of China (right), and Kirsten Moore-Towers and Dylan Moscovitch of Canada (left)

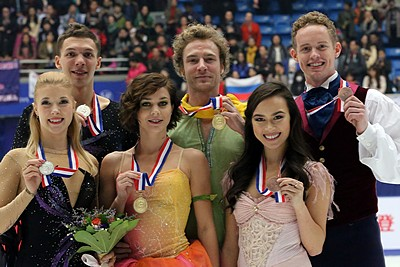
The gold, silver, and bronze medalists in the ice dance event in 2013: Nathalie Péchalat and Fabian Bourzat of France (center), Ekaterina Bobrova and Dmitri Soloviev of Russia (left), and Madison Chock and Evan Bates of the United States (right)

== History ==
Beginning with the 1995–96 season, the International Skating Union (ISU) launched the Champions Series – later renamed the Grand Prix Series – which, at its inception, consisted of five qualifying competitions and the Champions Series Final. This allowed skaters to perfect their programs earlier in the season, as well as compete against the same skaters whom they would later encounter at the World Figure Skating Championships. This series also provided the viewing public with additional televised skating, which had been in demand. Skaters earned points based on their results in their respective competitions and the top skaters or teams in each discipline were then invited to compete at the Champions Series Final.

The first edition of the Cup of China was held in 2003 in Beijing. It replaced the Bofrost Cup on Ice, which had been one of the founding events of the Grand Prix Series, after the Chinese Skating Association reached a more lucrative television contract with the ISU. Timothy Goebel of the United States won this inaugural men's event, Elena Liashenko of Ukraine won the women's event, Shen Xue and Zhao Hongbo of China won the pairs event, and Tatiana Navka and Roman Kostomarov of Russia won the ice dance event.

In 2018, the Chinese Skating Association declined to host any international skating events so as to prepare its venues for the 2022 Winter Olympics. Finland hosted a replacement event, the Grand Prix of Helsinki, instead. Due to the ongoing COVID-19 pandemic, a number of modifications were made to the structure of the 2020 Cup of China, with only skaters from China permitted to compete. On 9 July 2020, the General Administration of Sport of China announced that no international sporting events would be held in China in 2020 except for test events for the 2022 Winter Olympics. The ISU announced on 13 July that the 2020 Cup of China would be held as scheduled due to its connection to the Beijing test event, the Grand Prix of Figure Skating Final. On 29 October 2020, the Chinese Skating Association announced that the Cup of China would be held with no audience presence.

The 2021 Cup of China, originally scheduled to be held in Chongqing, was cancelled because of travel and quarantine restrictions related to the COVID-19 pandemic. The Gran Premio d'Italia in Turin served as its replacement. On 21 July 2022, it was confirmed that the 2022 Cup of China was cancelled due to China's ongoing COVID-19 travel restrictions. The MK John Wilson Trophy in Sheffield, England, in the United Kingdom, served as its replacement.

On 30 June 2026, the ISU announced that figure skaters from Russia and Belarus, who had been banned from attending any international competitions following the 2022 Russian invasion of Ukraine since 1 March 2022, would be allowed to return to competition, but as Individual Neutral Athletes (AINs). Skaters were required to undergo an individual assessment conducted by the ISU to determine whether they met the criteria for neutral status, which included having not previously taken active part in military operations in the war against Ukraine, nor having actively and publicly supported the war. As AINs, Russian and Belarusian skaters were required to compete without items of state recognition such as their national flags or anthems.

== Medalists ==
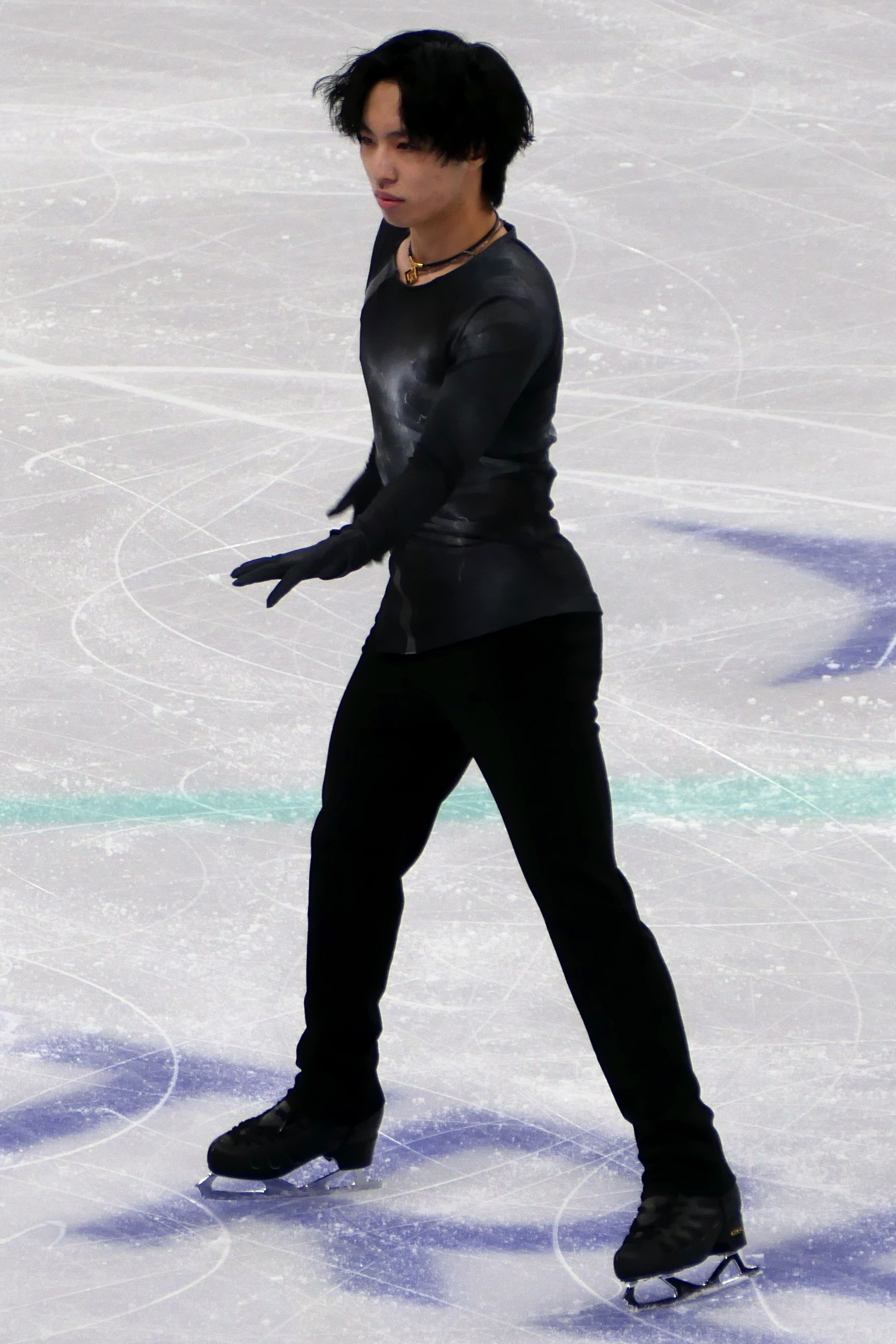
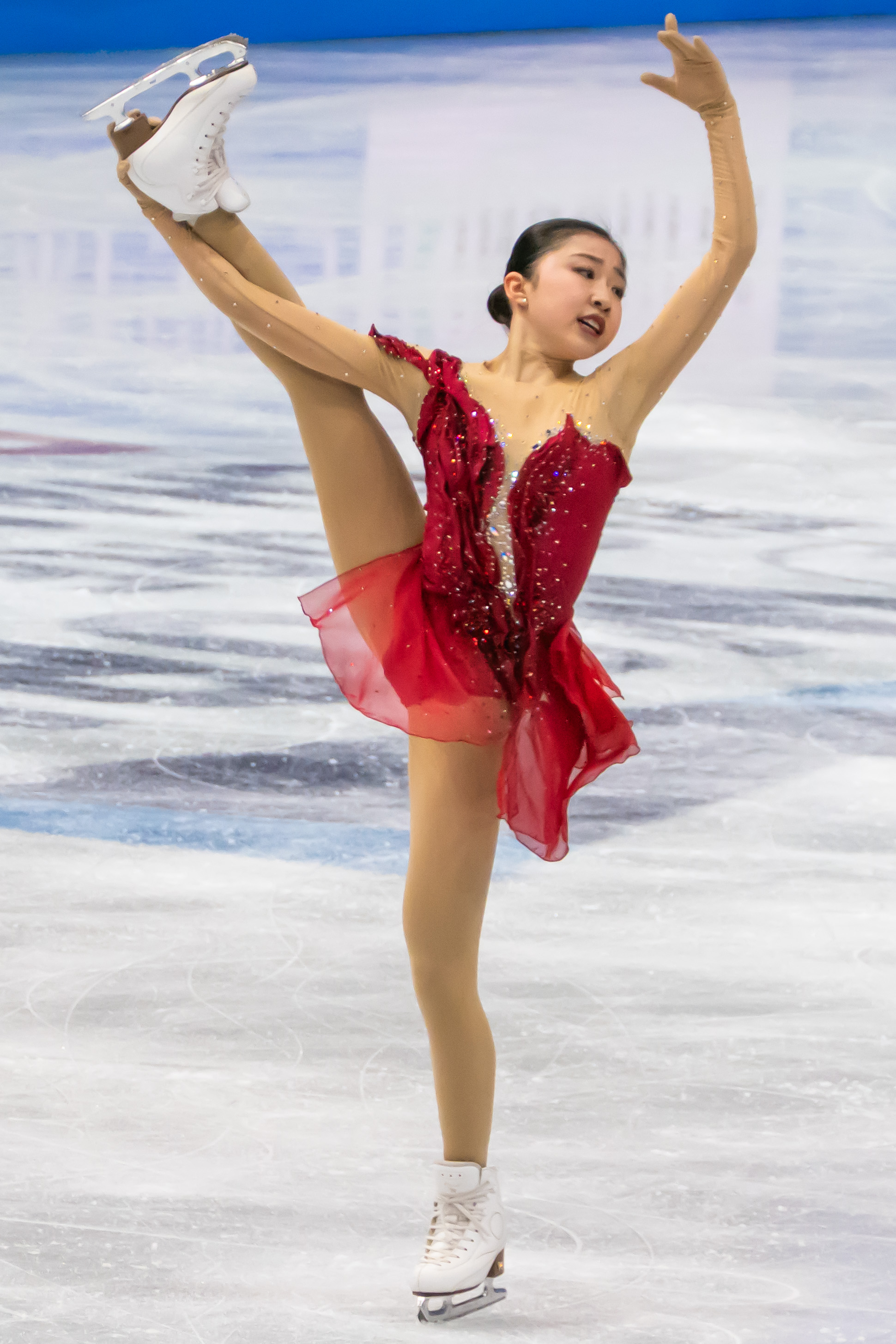
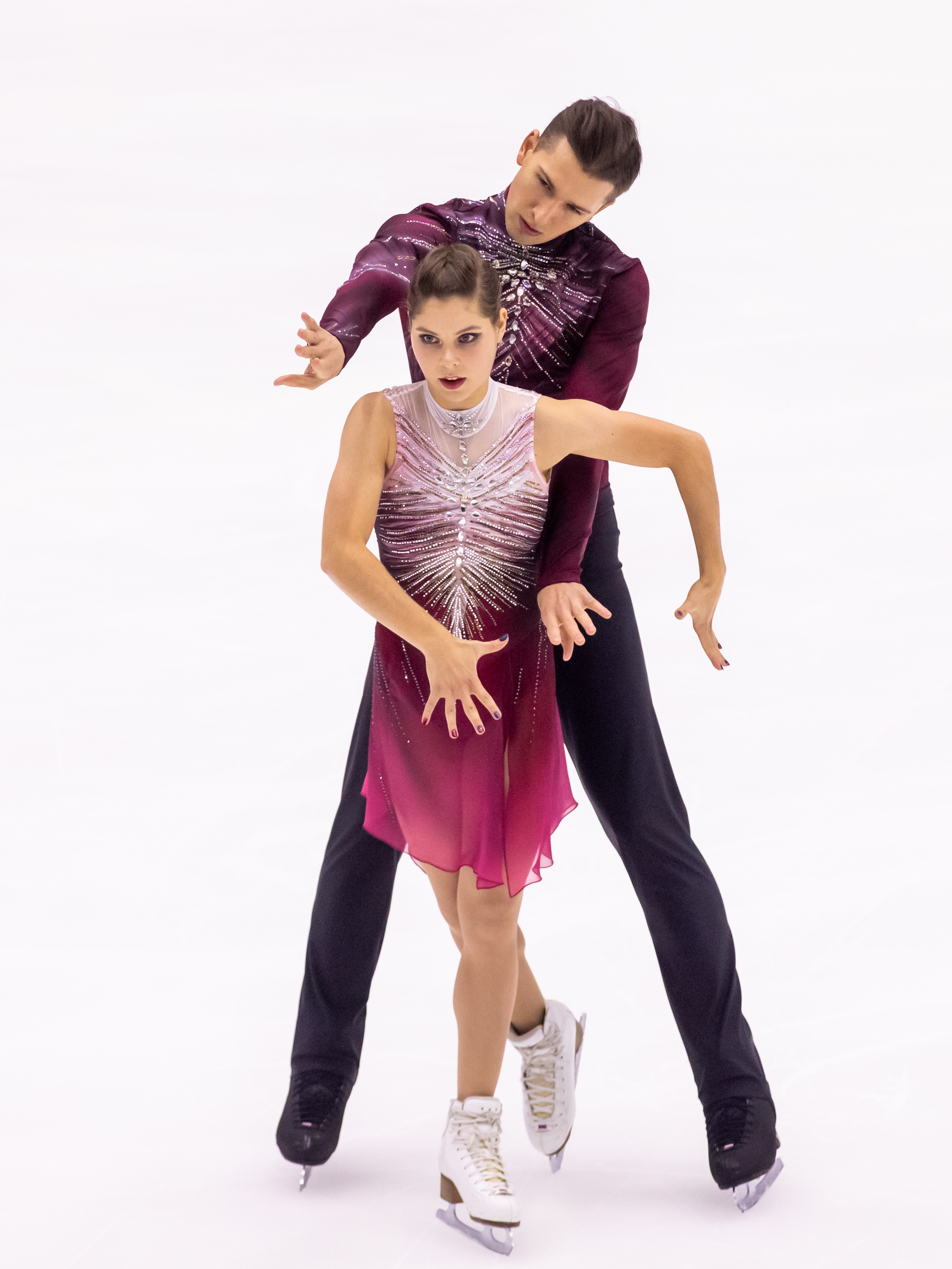
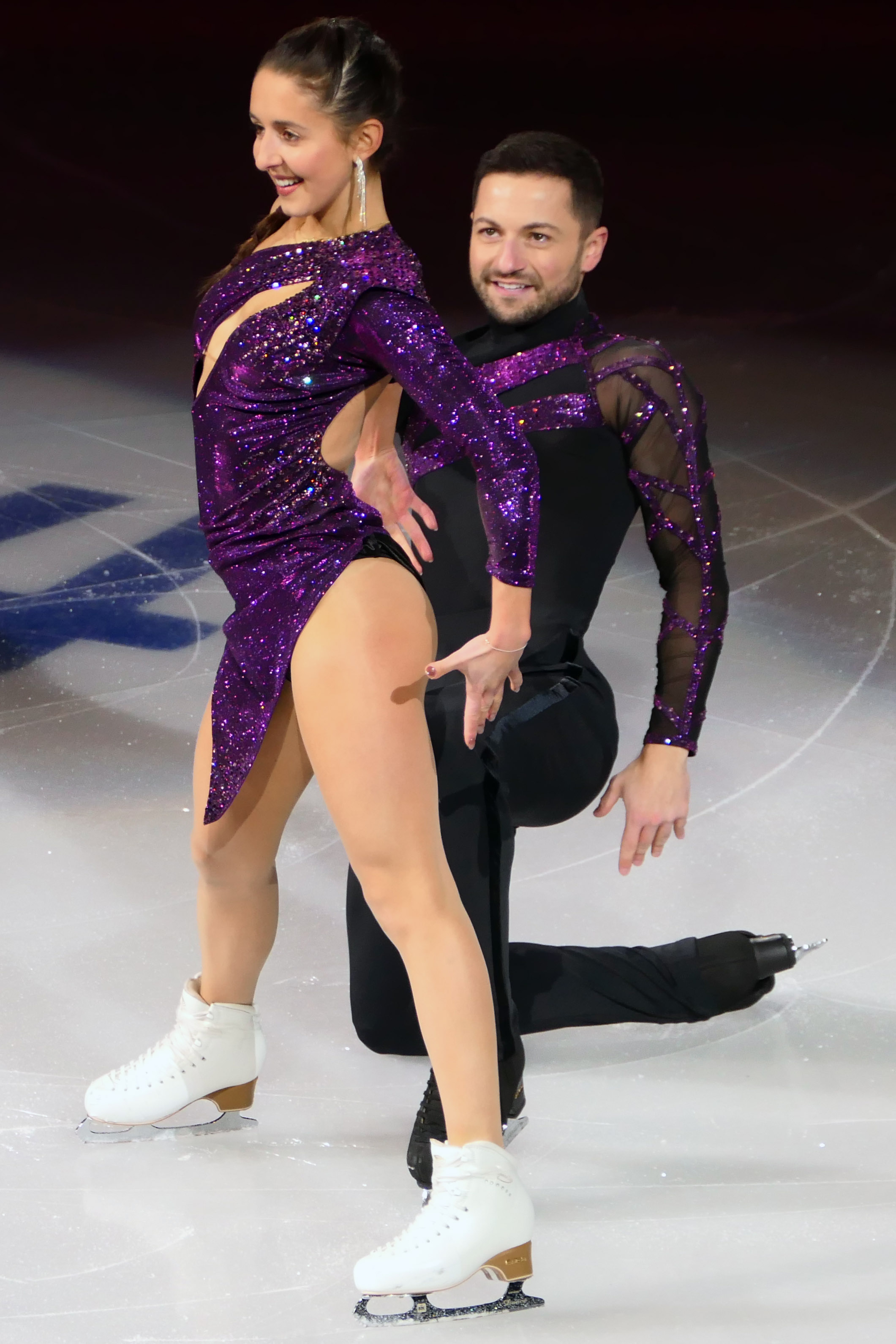
The reigning Cup of China champions (from left to right): Kao Miura of Japan (men's singles); Mone Chiba of Japan (women's singles); Anastasia Mishina and Aleksandr Galliamov of Russia (pair skating); and Lilah Fear and Lewis Gibson of Great Britain (ice dance)

=== Men's singles ===
Men's event medalists
Year	Location	Gold	Silver	Bronze	Ref.
2003	Beijing	(United States) Timothy Goebel	(France) Brian Joubert	(China) Li Chengjiang	
2004	Beijing	(Canada) Jeffrey Buttle	(China) Li Chengjiang	(Germany) Stefan Lindemann	
2005	Beijing	(Canada) Emanuel Sandhu	(Switzerland) Stéphane Lambiel	(Russia) Andrei Griazev	
2006	Nanjing	(United States) Evan Lysacek	(Belarus) Sergei Davydov	(Canada) Emanuel Sandhu	
2007	Harbin	(United States) Johnny Weir	(United States) Evan Lysacek	(Switzerland) Stéphane Lambiel	
2008	Beijing	(United States) Jeremy Abbott	(United States) Stephen Carriere	(Czech Republic) Tomáš Verner	
2009	Beijing	(Japan) Nobunari Oda	(United States) Evan Lysacek	(Russia) Sergei Voronov	
2010	Beijing	(Japan) Takahiko Kozuka	(United States) Brandon Mroz	(Czech Republic) Tomáš Verner	
2011	Shanghai	(United States) Jeremy Abbott	(Japan) Nobunari Oda	(China) Song Nan	
2012	Shanghai	(Japan) Tatsuki Machida	(Japan) Daisuke Takahashi	(Russia) Sergei Voronov	
2013	Beijing	(China) Yan Han	(Russia) Maxim Kovtun	(Japan) Takahiko Kozuka	
2014	Shanghai	(Russia) Maxim Kovtun	(Japan) Yuzuru Hanyu	(United States) Richard Dornbush	
2015	Beijing	(Spain) Javier Fernández	(China) Jin Boyang	(China) Yan Han	
2016	Beijing	(Canada) Patrick Chan	(China) Jin Boyang	(Russia) Sergei Voronov	
2017	Beijing	(Russia) Mikhail Kolyada	(China) Jin Boyang	(United States) Max Aaron	
2018	No competition held				
2019	Chongqing	(China) Jin Boyang	(China) Yan Han	(Italy) Matteo Rizzo	
2020	Chongqing	(China) Jin Boyang	(China) Yan Han	(China) Chen Yudong	
2021	Chongqing	Competitions cancelled due to the COVID-19 pandemic			
2022	Chongqing	Competitions cancelled due to the COVID-19 pandemic			
2023	Chongqing	(France) Adam Siao Him Fa	(Japan) Shoma Uno	(Kazakhstan) Mikhail Shaidorov	
2024	Chongqing	(Japan) Shun Sato	(Kazakhstan) Mikhail Shaidorov	(France) Adam Siao Him Fa	
2025	Chongqing	(Japan) Shun Sato	(Italy) Daniel Grassl	(Kazakhstan) Mikhail Shaidorov	
2026	Shenzhen	(Japan) Kao Miura	(Individual Neutral Athletes) Vladislav Dikidzhi	(Individual Neutral Athletes) Evgeni Semenenko	

=== Women's singles ===
Women's event medalists
Year	Location	Gold	Silver	Bronze	Ref.
2003	Beijing	(Ukraine) Elena Liashenko	(Japan) Yoshie Onda	(Japan) Fumie Suguri	
2004	Beijing	(Russia) Irina Slutskaya	(Russia) Viktoria Volchkova	(Canada) Joannie Rochette	
2005	Beijing	(Russia) Irina Slutskaya	(Japan) Mao Asada	(Japan) Shizuka Arakawa	
2006	Nanjing	(Hungary) Júlia Sebestyén	(Japan) Yukari Nakano	(United States) Emily Hughes	
2007	Harbin	(South Korea) Yuna Kim	(United States) Caroline Zhang	(Italy) Carolina Kostner	
2008	Beijing	(South Korea) Yuna Kim	(Japan) Miki Ando	(Finland) Laura Lepistö	
2009	Beijing	(Japan) Akiko Suzuki	(Finland) Kiira Korpi	(Canada) Joannie Rochette	
2010	Beijing	(Japan) Miki Ando	(Japan) Akiko Suzuki	(Russia) Alena Leonova	
2011	Shanghai	(Italy) Carolina Kostner	(United States) Mirai Nagasu	(Russia) Adelina Sotnikova	
2012	Shanghai	(Japan) Mao Asada	(Russia) Yulia Lipnitskaya	(Finland) Kiira Korpi	
2013	Beijing	(Russia) Anna Pogorilaya	(Russia) Adelina Sotnikova	(Italy) Carolina Kostner	
2014	Shanghai	(Russia) Elizaveta Tuktamysheva	(Russia) Yulia Lipnitskaya	(Japan) Kanako Murakami	
2015	Beijing	(Japan) Mao Asada	(Japan) Rika Hongo	(Russia) Elena Radionova	
2016	Beijing	(Russia) Elena Radionova	(Canada) Kaetlyn Osmond	(Russia) Elizaveta Tuktamysheva	
2017	Beijing	(Russia) Alina Zagitova	(Japan) Wakaba Higuchi	(Russia) Elena Radionova	
2018	No competition held				
2019	Chongqing	(Russia) Anna Shcherbakova	(Japan) Satoko Miyahara	(Russia) Elizaveta Tuktamysheva	
2020	Chongqing	(China) Chen Hongyi	(China) Angel Li	(China) Jin Minzhi	
2021	Chongqing	Competitions cancelled due to the COVID-19 pandemic			
2022	Chongqing	Competitions cancelled due to the COVID-19 pandemic			
2023	Chongqing	(Japan) Hana Yoshida	(Japan) Rinka Watanabe	(Belgium) Loena Hendrickx	
2024	Chongqing	(United States) Amber Glenn	(Japan) Mone Chiba	(South Korea) Kim Chae-yeon	
2025	Chongqing	(United States) Amber Glenn	(United States) Alysa Liu	(Japan) Rinka Watanabe	
2026	Shenzhen	(Japan) Mone Chiba	(Individual Neutral Athletes) Alexandra Ignatova	(South Korea) Lee Hae-in	

=== Pairs ===
Pairs event medalists
Year	Location	Gold	Silver	Bronze	Ref.
2003	Beijing	(China); Shen Xue; Zhao Hongbo	(China); Pang Qing; Tong Jian	(Russia); Maria Petrova; Alexei Tikhonov	
2004	Beijing	(China); Shen Xue; Zhao Hongbo	(China); Zhang Dan; Zhang Hao	(Canada); Valérie Marcoux; Craig Buntin	
2005	Beijing	(Russia); Maria Petrova; Alexei Tikhonov	(China); Pang Qing; Tong Jian	(Poland); Dorota Zagórska; Mariusz Siudek	
2006	Nanjing	(China); Shen Xue; Zhao Hongbo	(China); Pang Qing; Tong Jian	(Germany); Aljona Savchenko; Robin Szolkowy	
2007	Harbin	(China); Pang Qing; Tong Jian	(United States); Keauna McLaughlin; Rockne Brubaker	(Canada); Jessica Miller; Ian Moram	
2008	Beijing	(China); Zhang Dan; Zhang Hao	(Ukraine); Tatiana Volosozhar; Stanislav Morozov	(China); Pang Qing; Tong Jian	
2009	Beijing	(China); Shen Xue; Zhao Hongbo	(China); Zhang Dan; Zhang Hao	(Ukraine); Tatiana Volosozhar; Stanislav Morozov	
2010	Beijing	(China); Pang Qing; Tong Jian	(China); Sui Wenjing; Han Cong	(United States); Caitlin Yankowskas; John Coughlin	
2011	Shanghai	(Russia); Yuko Kavaguti; Alexander Smirnov	(China); Zhang Dan; Zhang Hao	(Canada); Kirsten Moore-Towers; Dylan Moscovitch	
2012	Shanghai	(China); Pang Qing; Tong Jian	(Russia); Yuko Kavaguti; Alexander Smirnov	(Russia); Ksenia Stolbova; Fedor Klimov	
2013	Beijing	(Germany); Aljona Savchenko; Robin Szolkowy	(China); Pang Qing; Tong Jian	(China); Peng Cheng; Zhang Hao	
2014	Shanghai	(China); Peng Cheng; Zhang Hao	(China); Yu Xiaoyu; Jin Yang	(China); Wang Xuehan; Wang Lei	
2015	Beijing	(Russia); Yuko Kavaguti; Alexander Smirnov	(China); Sui Wenjing; Han Cong	(China); Yu Xiaoyu; Jin Yang	
2016	Beijing	(China); Yu Xiaoyu; Zhang Hao	(China); Peng Cheng; Jin Yang	(Canada); Liubov Ilyushechkina; Dylan Moscovitch	
2017	Beijing	(China); Sui Wenjing; Han Cong	(China); Yu Xiaoyu; Zhang Hao	(Canada); Kirsten Moore-Towers; Michael Marinaro	
2018	No competition held				
2019	Chongqing	(China); Sui Wenjing; Han Cong	(China); Peng Cheng; Jin Yang	(Canada); Liubov Ilyushechkina; Charlie Bilodeau	
2020	Chongqing	(China); Peng Cheng; Jin Yang	(China); Wang Yuchen; Huang Yihang	(China); Zhu Daizifei; Liu Yuhang	
2021	Chongqing	Competitions cancelled due to the COVID-19 pandemic			
2022	Chongqing	Competitions cancelled due to the COVID-19 pandemic			
2023	Chongqing	(Canada); Deanna Stellato-Dudek; Maxime Deschamps	(Italy); Rebecca Ghilardi; Filippo Ambrosini	(China); Peng Cheng; Wang Lei	
2024	Chongqing	(Italy); Sara Conti; Niccolò Macii	(Germany); Minerva Fabienne Hase; Nikita Volodin	(Canada); Lia Pereira; Trennt Michaud	
2025	Chongqing	(Georgia (country)); Anastasiia Metelkina; Luka Berulava	(Italy); Sara Conti; Niccolò Macii	(China); Sui Wenjing; Han Cong	
2026	Shenzhen	(Individual Neutral Athletes); Anastasia Mishina; Aleksandr Galliamov	(Georgia (country)); Anastasiia Metelkina; Luka Berulava	(Japan); Yuna Nagaoka; Sumitada Moriguchi	

=== Ice dance ===
Ice dance event medalists
Year	Location	Gold	Silver	Bronze	Ref.
2003	Beijing	(Russia); Tatiana Navka; Roman Kostomarov	(Ukraine); Elena Grushina; Ruslan Goncharov	(France); Isabelle Delobel; Olivier Schoenfelder	
2004	Beijing	(United States); Tanith Belbin; Benjamin Agosto	(Israel); Galit Chait; Sergei Sakhnovski	(Canada); Marie-France Dubreuil; Patrice Lauzon	
2005	Beijing	(Russia); Tatiana Navka; Roman Kostomarov	(Israel); Galit Chait; Sergei Sakhnovski	(Canada); Megan Wing; Aaron Lowe	
2006	Nanjing	(Russia); Oksana Domnina; Maxim Shabalin	(United States); Tanith Belbin; Benjamin Agosto	(Russia); Jana Khokhlova; Sergei Novitski	
2007	Harbin	(United States); Tanith Belbin; Benjamin Agosto	(Russia); Oksana Domnina; Maxim Shabalin	(Italy); Federica Faiella; Massimo Scali	
2008	Beijing	(Russia); Oksana Domnina; Maxim Shabalin	(United States); Tanith Belbin; Benjamin Agosto	(Russia); Jana Khokhlova; Sergei Novitski	
2009	Beijing	(United States); Tanith Belbin; Benjamin Agosto	(Russia); Jana Khokhlova; Sergei Novitski	(Italy); Federica Faiella; Massimo Scali	
2010	Beijing	(France); Nathalie Péchalat; Fabian Bourzat	(Russia); Ekaterina Bobrova; Dmitri Soloviev	(Italy); Federica Faiella; Massimo Scali	
2011	Shanghai	(Russia); Ekaterina Bobrova; Dmitri Soloviev	(United States); Maia Shibutani; Alex Shibutani	(France); Pernelle Carron; Lloyd Jones	
2012	Shanghai	(France); Nathalie Péchalat; Fabian Bourzat	(Russia); Ekaterina Bobrova; Dmitri Soloviev	(Canada); Kaitlyn Weaver; Andrew Poje	
2013	Beijing	(France); Nathalie Péchalat; Fabian Bourzat	(Russia); Ekaterina Bobrova; Dmitri Soloviev	(United States); Madison Chock; Evan Bates	
2014	Shanghai	(France); Gabriella Papadakis; Guillaume Cizeron	(United States); Maia Shibutani; Alex Shibutani	(Italy); Anna Cappellini; Luca Lanotte	
2015	Beijing	(Italy); Anna Cappellini; Luca Lanotte	(United States); Madison Chock; Evan Bates	(Russia); Elena Ilinykh; Ruslan Zhiganshin	
2016	Beijing	(United States); Maia Shibutani; Alex Shibutani	(Canada); Kaitlyn Weaver; Andrew Poje	(Russia); Alexandra Stepanova; Ivan Bukin	
2017	Beijing	(France); Gabriella Papadakis; Guillaume Cizeron	(United States); Madison Chock; Evan Bates	(Russia); Ekaterina Bobrova; Dmitri Soloviev	
2018	No competition held				
2019	Chongqing	(Russia); Victoria Sinitsina; Nikita Katsalapov	(United States); Madison Chock; Evan Bates	(Canada); Laurence Fournier Beaudry; Nikolaj Sørensen	
2020	Chongqing	(China); Wang Shiyue; Liu Xinyu	(China); Chen Hong; Sun Zhuoming	(China); Ning Wanqi; Wang Chao	
2021	Chongqing	Competitions cancelled due to the COVID-19 pandemic			
2022	Chongqing	Competitions cancelled due to the COVID-19 pandemic			
2023	Chongqing	(Canada); Piper Gilles; Paul Poirier	(Canada); Marjorie Lajoie; Zachary Lagha	(United States); Caroline Green; Michael Parsons	
2024	Chongqing	(Italy); Charlène Guignard; Marco Fabbri	(Canada); Marjorie Lajoie; Zachary Lagha	(United States); Christina Carreira; Anthony Ponomarenko	
2025	Chongqing	(United States); Madison Chock; Evan Bates	(United States); Emilea Zingas; Vadym Kolesnik	(France); Evgeniia Lopareva; Geoffrey Brissaud	
2026	Shenzhen	(United Kingdom); Lilah Fear; Lewis Gibson	(Georgia (country)); Diana Davis; Gleb Smolkin	(Spain); Olivia Smart; Tim Dieck	

== Records ==
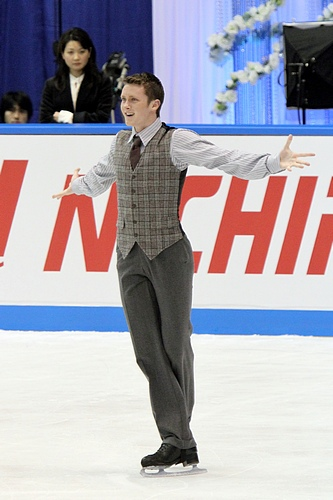
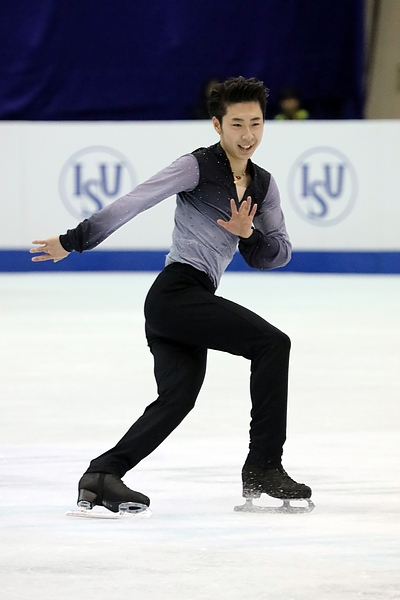
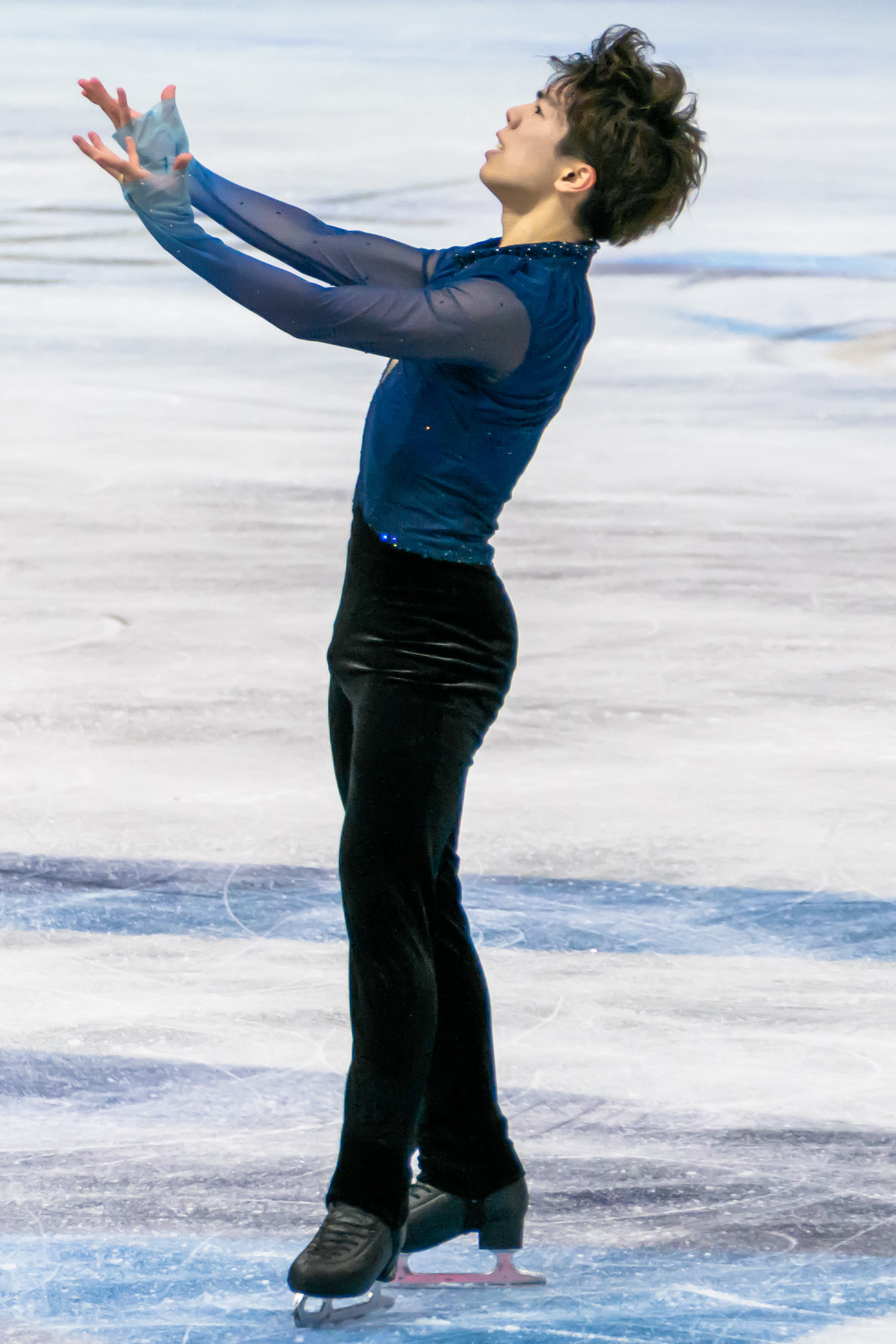
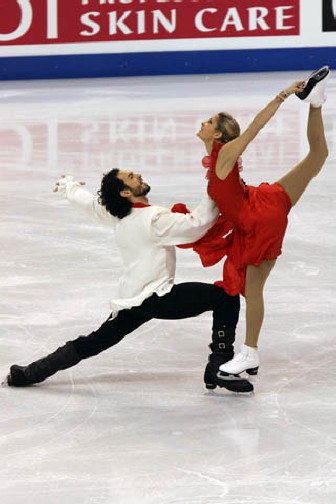
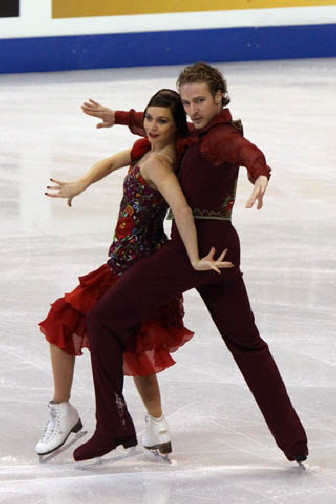
From left to right: Jeremy Abbott of the United States, Jin Boyang of China, and Shun Sato of Japan have each won two Cup of China titles each in men's singles; while Tanith Belbin and Benjamin Agosto of the United States, and Nathalie Péchalat and Fabian Bourzat of France, have each won three Cup of China titles in ice dance.
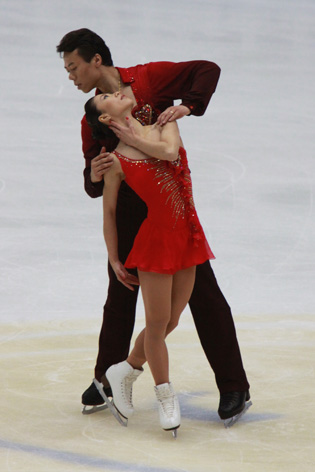
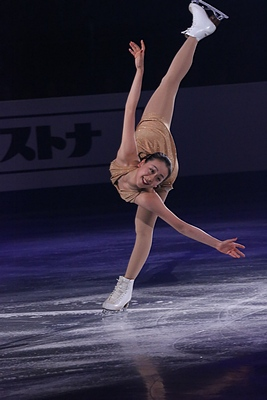
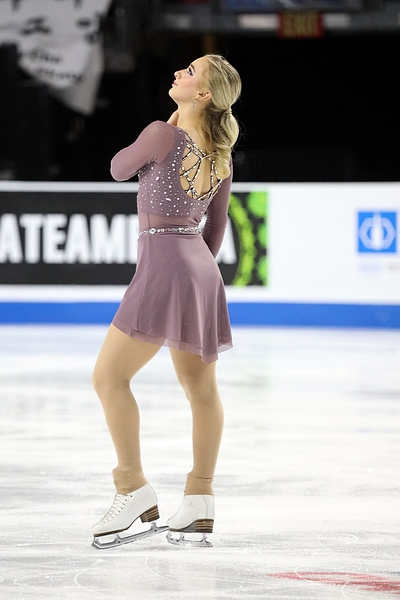
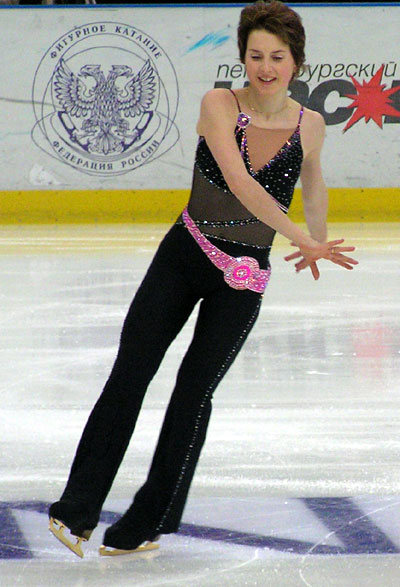
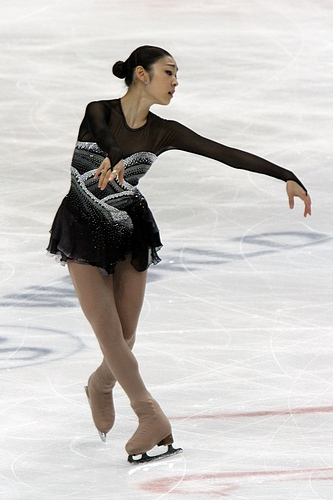
From left to right: Shen Xue and Zhao Hongbo of China have won four Cup of China titles in pair skating; while Mao Asada of Japan, Amber Glenn of the United States, Irina Slutskaya of Russia, and Yuna Kim of South Korea have each won two Cup of China titles in women's singles.

Records
Discipline	Most titles			
Discipline	Skater(s)	No.	Years	Ref.
Men's singles	(United States); Jeremy Abbott	2	2008; 2011	
Men's singles	(China); Jin Boyang	2	2019–20	
Men's singles	(Japan); Shun Sato	2	2024–25	
Women's singles	(Japan); Mao Asada	2	2012; 2015	
Women's singles	(United States); Amber Glenn	2	2024–25	
Women's singles	(Russia); Irina Slutskaya	2	2004–05	
Women's singles	(South Korea); Yuna Kim	2	2007–08	
Pairs	(China); Shen Xue; Zhao Hongbo	4	2003–04; 2006; 2009	
Ice dance	(United States); Tanith Belbin; Benjamin Agosto	3	2004; 2007; 2009	
Ice dance	(France); Nathalie Péchalat; Fabian Bourzat	3	2010; 2012–13	

== Cumulative medal count ==
=== Men's singles ===
Total number of Cup of China medals in men's singles by nation
Rank	Nation	Gold	Silver	Bronze	Total
1	Japan	6	4	1	11
2	United States	5	4	2	11
3	China	3	6	4	13
4	Canada	3	0	1	4
5	Russia	2	1	4	7
6	France	1	1	1	3
7	Spain	1	0	0	1
8	Kazakhstan	0	1	2	3
9	Individual Neutral Athletes	0	1	1	2
9	Italy	0	1	1	2
9	Switzerland	0	1	1	2
12	Belarus	0	1	0	1
13	Czech Republic	0	0	2	2
14	Germany	0	0	1	1
Totals (14 entries)		21	21	21	63

=== Women's singles ===
Total number of Cup of China medals in women's singles by nation
Rank	Nation	Gold	Silver	Bronze	Total
1	Russia	7	4	6	17
2	Japan	6	10	4	20
3	United States	2	3	1	6
4	South Korea	2	0	2	4
5	China	1	1	1	3
6	Italy	1	0	2	3
7	Hungary	1	0	0	1
7	Ukraine	1	0	0	1
9	Canada	0	1	2	3
9	Finland	0	1	2	3
11	Individual Neutral Athletes	0	1	0	1
12	Belgium	0	0	1	1
Totals (12 entries)		21	21	21	63

=== Pairs ===
Total number of Cup of China medals in pairs by nation
Rank	Nation	Gold	Silver	Bronze	Total
1	China	13	14	7	34
2	Russia	3	1	2	6
3	Italy	1	2	0	3
4	Germany	1	1	1	3
5	Georgia	1	1	0	2
6	Canada	1	0	6	7
7	Individual Neutral Athletes	1	0	0	1
8	United States	0	1	2	3
9	Ukraine	0	1	1	2
10	Japan	0	0	1	1
10	Poland	0	0	1	1
Totals (11 entries)		21	21	21	63

=== Ice dance ===
Total number of Cup of China medals in ice dance by nation
Rank	Nation	Gold	Silver	Bronze	Total
1	Russia	6	5	5	16
2	United States	5	8	3	16
3	France	5	0	3	8
4	Italy	2	0	4	6
5	Canada	1	3	4	8
6	China	1	1	1	3
7	Great Britain	1	0	0	1
8	Israel	0	2	0	2
9	Georgia	0	1	0	1
9	Ukraine	0	1	0	1
11	Spain	0	0	1	1
Totals (11 entries)		21	21	21	63

=== Total medals ===
Total number of Cup of China medals by nation
Rank	Nation	Gold	Silver	Bronze	Total
1	China	18	22	13	53
2	Russia	18	11	17	46
3	United States	12	16	8	36
4	Japan	12	14	6	32
5	France	6	1	4	11
6	Canada	5	4	13	22
7	Italy	4	3	7	14
8	South Korea	2	0	2	4
9	Individual Neutral Athletes	1	2	1	4
9	Ukraine	1	2	1	4
11	Georgia	1	2	0	3
12	Germany	1	1	2	4
13	Spain	1	0	1	2
14	Great Britain	1	0	0	1
14	Hungary	1	0	0	1
16	Israel	0	2	0	2
17	Finland	0	1	2	3
17	Kazakhstan	0	1	2	3
19	Switzerland	0	1	1	2
20	Belarus	0	1	0	1
21	Czech Republic	0	0	2	2
22	Belgium	0	0	1	1
22	Poland	0	0	1	1
Totals (23 entries)		84	84	84	252
