= Figure skating at the 2015 Winter Universiade – Pairs =

The pairs competition of the figure skating at the 2015 Winter Universiade was held at the Universiade Igloo in Granada. The short program was held on February 5 and the free skating was held on February 6.

== Results ==
=== Short program ===
Pl.	Name	Nation	TSS	TES	PCS	SS	TR	PE	CH	IN	Ded	StN
1	Yu Xiaoyu / Jin Yang	China	64.75	35.33	29.42	7.42	7.17	7.42	7.42	7.42	0.00	6
2	Kristina Astakhova / Alexei Rogonov	Russia	59.88	32.40	27.48	6.58	6.75	6.92	6.92	7.17	0.00	1
3	Vera Bazarova / Andrei Deputat	Russia	59.07	31.13	27.94	7.25	6.67	7.00	7.08	6.92	0.00	2
4	Vanessa James / Morgan Ciprès	France	57.28	29.80	27.48	7.17	6.75	6.67	7.00	6.75	0.00	3
5	Wang Wenting / Zhang Yan	China	54.59	28.73	25.86	6.58	6.17	6.67	6.58	6.33	0.00	4
6	Maria Paliakova / Nikita Bochkov	Belarus	49.62	26.94	22.68	5.42	5.33	5.67	6.00	5.92	0.00	5

=== Free skating ===
Pl.	Name	Nation	TSS	TES	PCS	SS	TR	PE	CH	IN	Ded	StN
1	Yu Xiaoyu / Jin Yang	China	117.17	59.51	58.66	7.58	7.08	7.42	7.25	7.33	-1.00	5
2	Kristina Astakhova / Alexei Rogonov	Russia	114.99	58.98	56.01	7.00	7.17	6.92	7.00	6.92	0.00	4
3	Vanessa James / Morgan Ciprès	France	110.91	55.24	56.67	7.25	7.08	6.92	7.00	7.17	-1.00	2
4	Vera Bazarova / Andrei Deputat	Russia	104.79	47.32	57.47	7.33	6.92	7.00	7.42	7.25	0.00	6
5	Wang Wenting / Zhang Yan	China	82.81	41.53	42.28	5.67	5.17	5.00	5.42	5.17	-1.00	3
6	Maria Paliakova / Nikita Bochkov	Belarus	81.57	41.57	42.00	5.42	5.00	5.00	5.50	5.33	-2.00	1

=== Overall ===
Rank	Name	Nation	TP	SP		FS	
1st place, gold medalist(s)	Yu Xiaoyu / Jin Yang	China	181.92	1	64.75	1	117.17
2nd place, silver medalist(s)	Kristina Astakhova / Alexei Rogonov	Russia	174.87	2	59.88	2	114.99
3rd place, bronze medalist(s)	Vanessa James / Morgan Ciprès	France	168.19	4	57.28	3	110.91
4	Vera Bazarova / Andrei Deputat	Russia	163.86	3	59.07	4	104.79
5	Wang Wenting / Zhang Yan	China	137.40	5	54.59	5	82.81
6	Maria Paliakova / Nikita Bochkov	Belarus	131.19	6	49.62	6	81.57
