= 2015 NHK Trophy =

- Type: Grand Prix
- Date: November 27 – 29
- Season: 2015–16
- Location: Nagano
- Host: Japan Skating Federation
- Venue: Big Hat

Champions
- Men's singles: (Japan) Yuzuru Hanyu
- Ladies' singles: (Japan) Satoko Miyahara
- Pairs: (Canada) Meagan Duhamel / Eric Radford
- Ice dance: (United States) Maia Shibutani / Alex Shibutani
- Previous: 2014 NHK Trophy
- Next: 2016 NHK Trophy
- Previous Grand Prix: 2015 Rostelecom Cup
- Next Grand Prix: 2015–16 Grand Prix Final

The 2015 NHK Trophy was the final event of six in the 2015–16 ISU Grand Prix of Figure Skating, a senior-level international invitational competition series. It was held at the Big Hat in Nagano on November 27–29. Medals were awarded in the disciplines of men's singles, ladies' singles, pair skating, and ice dancing. Skaters earned points toward qualifying for the 2015–16 Grand Prix Final.

== Entries ==
Country	Men	Ladies	Pairs	Ice dancing
Australia	Brendan Kerry			
Canada	Elladj Baldé	Kaetlyn Osmond	Meagan Duhamel / Eric Radford; Lubov Iliushechkina / Dylan Moscovitch	
China	Jin Boyang	Li Zijun	Yu Xiaoyu / Jin Yang	
Czech Republic	Michal Březina			
France	Chafik Besseghier		Vanessa James / Morgan Ciprès	
United Kingdom			Amani Fancy / Christopher Boyadji	Penny Coomes / Nicholas Buckland
Japan	Yuzuru Hanyu; Takahito Mura; Keiji Tanaka	Mao Asada; Mariko Kihara; Satoko Miyahara		Emi Hirai / Marien de la Asuncion; Kana Muramoto / Chris Reed
Russia	Maxim Kovtun; Konstantin Menshov	Maria Artemieva; Alena Leonova; Anna Pogorilaya	Vera Bazarova / Andrei Deputat	Ekaterina Bobrova / Dmitri Soloviev; Alexandra Stepanova / Ivan Bukin
United States	Richard Dornbush; Grant Hochstein	Courtney Hicks; Mirai Nagasu; Ashley Wagner	Jessica Calalang / Zack Sidhu; Alexa Scimeca / Chris Knierim	Anastasia Cannuscio / Colin McManus; Madison Hubbell / Zachary Donohue; Maia Shibutani / Alex Shibutani

=== Changes to preliminary assignments ===
- On September 9, Kana Muramoto / Chris Reed, Mariko Kihara and Keiji Tanaka were added as host picks.
- On September 24, Joshua Farris was removed from the roster. U.S. Figure Skating announced he had to withdraw due to a concussion. On September 28, his replacement was announced as Grant Hochstein.
- On November 11, Gabriella Papadakis / Guillaume Cizeron withdrew due to Papadakis not having fully recovered from her concussion. On November 17, Penny Coomes / Nicholas Buckland were announced as their replacement.
- On November 20, Tatiana Volosozhar / Maxim Trankov withdrew due to an injury to Volosozhar. They were replaced by Amani Fancy / Christopher Boyadji. Ice dancers Alexandra Paul / Mitchell Islam also withdrew. On November 21, they were replaced by Anastasia Cannuscio / Colin McManus.
- On November 21, Jason Brown withdrew due to a back strain injury. On November 23, he was replaced by Brendan Kerry.
- On November 23, Maé-Bérénice Méité withdrew from the ladies' event.

== Results ==
=== Men ===
Yuzuru Hanyu set a new world record for the short program (106.33), for the free skating (216.07), and for the combined total (322.40). He became the first person to have broken 200-point in the free skating and 300-point in the combined total as well as 100-point in the short program (2014 Winter Olympics).

Rank	Name	Nation	Total points	SP		FS	
1	Yuzuru Hanyu	Japan	322.40	1	106.33	1	216.07
2	Jin Boyang	China	266.43	2	95.64	2	170.79
3	Takahito Mura	Japan	242.21	3	88.29	5	153.92
4	Grant Hochstein	United States	235.63	8	74.30	3	161.33
5	Keiji Tanaka	Japan	234.90	9	73.74	4	161.16
6	Konstantin Menshov	Russia	233.58	6	79.79	6	153.79
7	Michal Březina	Czech Republic	222.49	5	81.64	9	140.85
8	Richard Dornbush	United States	217.50	7	78.20	10	139.30
9	Chafik Besseghier	France	215.82	10	72.51	7	143.31
10	Maxim Kovtun	Russia	212.63	4	82.27	11	130.36
11	Elladj Baldé	Canada	211.09	11	69.47	8	141.62
12	Brendan Kerry	Australia	177.98	12	61.20	12	116.78

=== Ladies ===
Rank	Name	Nation	Total points	SP		FS	
1	Satoko Miyahara	Japan	203.11	1	69.53	1	133.58
2	Courtney Hicks	United States	183.12	2	65.60	3	117.52
3	Mao Asada	Japan	182.99	4	62.50	2	120.49
4	Ashley Wagner	United States	179.33	3	63.71	5	115.62
5	Mirai Nagasu	United States	175.64	5	61.10	6	114.54
6	Kaetlyn Osmond	Canada	168.48	8	57.07	7	111.41
7	Li Zijun	China	166.40	6	60.78	10	105.62
8	Alena Leonova	Russia	165.75	7	59.63	9	106.12
9	Anna Pogorilaya	Russia	164.63	11	47.35	4	117.28
10	Mariko Kihara	Japan	163.19	10	54.96	8	108.23
11	Maria Artemieva	Russia	158.33	9	55.68	11	102.65

=== Pairs ===
Rank	Name	Nation	Total points	SP		FS	
1	Meagan Duhamel / Eric Radford	Canada	202.72	1	71.04	1	131.68
2	Yu Xiaoyu / Jin Yang	China	191.02	3	67.00	2	124.02
3	Alexa Scimeca / Chris Knierim	United States	190.66	2	68.43	3	122.23
4	Vera Bazarova / Andrei Deputat	Russia	181.70	4	64.06	5	117.64
5	Lubov Iliushechkina / Dylan Moscovitch	Canada	180.63	5	63.80	6	116.83
6	Vanessa James / Morgan Ciprès	France	180.20	6	61.91	4	118.29
7	Jessica Calalang / Zack Sidhu	United States	150.26	7	55.19	7	95.07
8	Amani Fancy / Christopher Boyadji	United Kingdom	125.80	8	42.52	8	83.28

=== Ice dancing ===
Rank	Name	Nation	Total points	SP		FS	
1	Maia Shibutani / Alex Shibutani	United States	174.43	1	68.08	1	106.35
2	Ekaterina Bobrova / Dmitri Soloviev	Russia	169.33	3	66.19	2	103.14
3	Madison Hubbell / Zachary Donohue	United States	167.49	2	66.57	3	100.92
4	Alexandra Stepanova / Ivan Bukin	Russia	160.64	4	61.96	4	98.68
5	Penny Coomes / Nicholas Buckland	United Kingdom	155.88	5	61.00	5	94.88
6	Anastasia Cannuscio / Colin McManus	United States	138.41	6	55.21	6	83.2
7	Kana Muramoto / Chris Reed	Japan	134.97	7	53.44	7	81.53
8	Emi Hirai / Marien de la Asuncion	Japan	115.59	8	43.61	8	71.98
