= Alexei Rogonov =

Russian pair skater (born 1988)

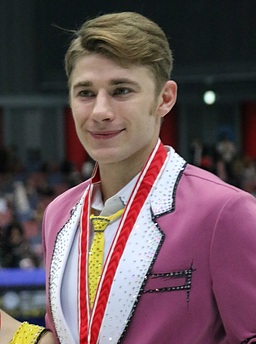
- Rogonov in 2017

Personal information
- Full name: Alexei Alexandrovich Rogonov
- Born: 6 June 1988 (age 38) Salsk, Russian SFSR, Soviet Union
- Height: 1.80 m (5 ft 11 in)

Figure skating career
- Country: Russia
- Partner: Alina Ustimkina
- Coach: Artur Dmitriev
- Skating club: UOR 4 Moscow
- Began skating: 1994
Medal record
Representing Russia
Figure skating: Pairs
Winter Universiade
Silver medal – second place	2015 Granada	Pairs
World Junior Championships
Silver medal – second place	2009 Sofia	Pairs

Alexei Alexandrovich Rogonov (Russian: Алексей Александрович Рогонов; born 6 June 1988) is a Russian former pair skater. With partner Kristina Astakhova, he is the 2015 Winter Universiade silver medalist.

With former skating partner Anastasia Martiusheva, he is the 2009 World Junior silver medalist, 2009 Russian Junior champion, and 2012 Russian national bronze medalist.

== Personal life ==
Rogonov was born on 6 June 1988 in Salsk. He and his wife, Elizaveta, were married in spring 2013.

== Career ==
Rogonov began skating at the age of six at an outdoor rink in Achinsk, Siberia. At the age of 16, he moved to Perm and trained as a pair skater under Ludmila Kalinina.

=== Partnership with Martiusheva ===
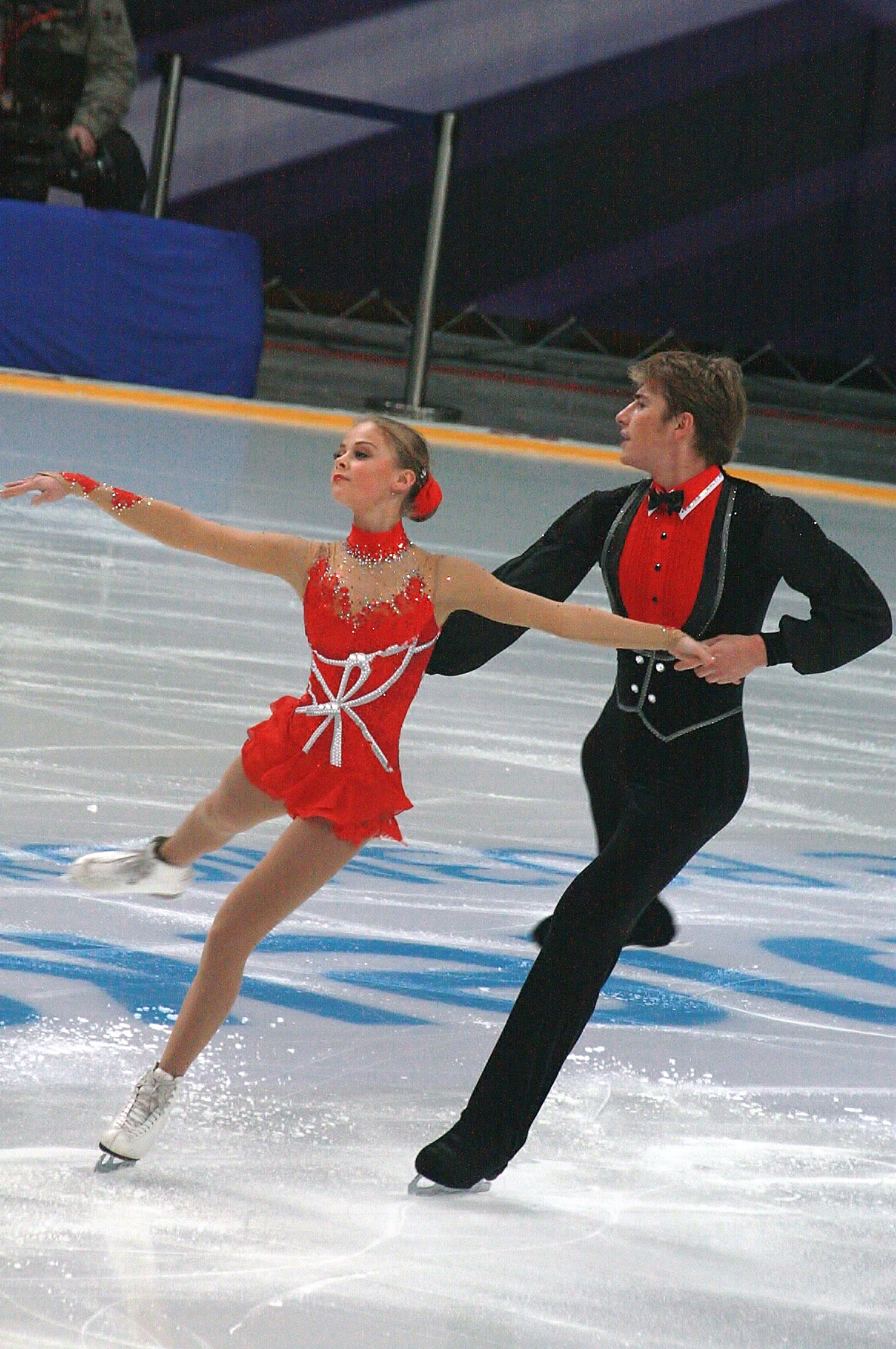
Martiusheva/Rogonov at the 2012 Rostelecom Cup.

Rogonov and Anastasia Martiusheva first met in Perm, skating in the same group but with different partners. After two years, Natalia Pavlova invited Rogonov to Moscow and paired him in 2006 with Martiusheva, who had arrived six months earlier. The pair won the 2009 Russian Junior title. At the 2009 World Junior Championships, they were 11th after the short program but finished first in the long program, ahead of Lubov Iliushechkina / Nodari Maisuradze. They moved up to second overall and took the silver medal.

Martiusheva/Rogonov made their senior Grand Prix debut at the 2009 Cup of Russia, where they finished seventh. They finished 9th at Russian Nationals. During the 2010–11 season, they were assigned to 2010 Skate Canada International but withdrew from the event. They won the 2010 Golden Spin of Zagreb. At the 2011 Russian Nationals, they placed 9th in the short program and 7th in the long, to finish 9th overall.

During the 2011–12 season, Martiusheva/Rogonov won the 2011 Golden Spin of Zagreb and Warsaw Cup. At the 2012 Russian Nationals, they placed second in the short program and third in the free skate and won the bronze medal.

In the 2012–13 season, Martiusheva/Rogonov won gold at the 2012 Ondrej Nepela Memorial. They competed on the Grand Prix series for the first time since 2009, finishing 5th at both of their events, the 2012 Rostelecom Cup and the 2012 NHK Trophy. They set their personal best overall score of 162.25 points. They finished 6th at the 2013 Russian Championships.

In 2013–14, Martiusheva/Rogonov began their season by taking silver at the Lombardia Trophy, followed by another silver at the 2013 Ondrej Nepela Trophy. They were seventh at their first Grand Prix assignment, the 2013 Cup of China. A week later, the pair replaced the injured Yuko Kavaguti / Alexander Smirnov at the 2013 NHK Trophy. Two days before the 2014 Russian Championships, Martiusheva injured a leg muscle in a bad fall and doctors ordered the pair to withdraw.

In January 2014, Rogonov joined a celebrity skating show in Lithuania, LNK's Šokiai ant ledo, as the partner of Lithuanian television host Gintarė Gurevičiūtė. They were named the winners.

=== 2014–15 season: Partnership with Astakhova ===
By June 2014, he formed a partnership with Kristina Astakhova, coached by Artur Dmitriev. Astakhova/Rogonov won both of their 2014–15 ISU Challenger Series (CS) events, the 2014 CS Volvo Open Cup and the 2014 CS Golden Spin of Zagreb. In between their CS events they took bronze at the 2014 Rostelecom Cup, their Grand Prix debut. They came in fourth at the 2015 Russian Championships, won silver at the 2015 Winter Universiade, and placed 10th at the 2015 World Championships, competing in the place of Ksenia Stolbova / Fedor Klimov who had withdrawn.

=== 2015–16 season ===
Astakhova/Rogonov started the 2015–16 season on the Challenger Series, taking silver at the 2015 Ondrej Nepela Trophy behind Stolbova/Klimov. Competing on the Grand Prix series, they placed 7th at the 2015 Skate America and 5th at the 2015 Cup of China. After winning silver at the 2015 Golden Spin of Zagreb, Astakhova/Rogonov finished 4th at the 2016 Russian Championships, ahead of Natalja Zabijako / Alexander Enbert. They were selected to compete at the 2016 European Championships after Stolbova/Klimov withdrew due to injury. At the 2016 Europeans Astakhova/Rogonov placed 7th after placing 7th in both the short program and the free skate.

=== 2016–17 season ===
Astakhova/Rogonov won silver at both of their 2016–17 ISU Challenger Series (CS) events, the 2016 CS Finlandia Trophy and the 2016 CS Golden Spin of Zagreb. In between their CS events they skated two Grand Prix competitions. They placed 6th at the 2016 Skate America but took the bronze medal at the 2016 Rostelecom Cup. Later they came in fourth at the 2017 Russian Championships.

=== 2017–18 season ===
Astakhova/Rogonov started their season by taking silver medal at their first 2017–18 ISU Challenger Series event, the 2017 CS Ondrej Nepela Trophy They then finished 5th at the 2017 CS Finlandia Trophy. Competing on the Grand Prix series, they won two bronze medals, first at the 2017 Rostelecom Cup and then at the 2017 NHK Trophy where they scored their personal best score of 203.64 points. This was the first international event where they scored above 200 points. They then skated their 3rd CS event, the 2017 CS Golden Spin of Zagreb where they won their 2nd CS series silver of the season. In December 2017 they placed 4th at the 2018 Russian Championships. This was the 4th consecutive time that they had placed 4th at the Russian Championships.

it was announced by the Russian Figure Skating Federation on January 23, 2018 that Ksenia Stolbova wasn't invited to the 2018 Olympics. Because of this Astakhova/Rogonov were sent instead. Astakhova/Rogonov placed 12th at the 2018 Winter Olympics. Later they placed 8th at the 2018 World Championships.

== Programs ==
=== With Astakhova ===
Season	Short program	Free skating	Exhibition
2017–18	Adagio for Strings by Samuel Barber; Requiem in D Minor by Wolfgang Amadeus Mozart; O Fortuna (from Carmina Burana) by Carl Orff	La La Land medley; Another Day of Sun; City Of Stars; Epilogue by Justin Hurwitz	Juno and Avos (opera) by Alexey Rybnikov; Shatter Me by Lindsey Stirling ft. Lzzy Hale
2016–17	Eugene Onegin; Io Ti Penso Amore (from Paganini vs Garrett) by David Garrett, Nicole Scherzinger	The Storm by Balázs Havasi; Le Bien qui fait mal (from Mozart, l'opéra rock)	Eugene Onegin
2015–16	The Artist by Ludovic Bource	Shatter Me by Lindsey Stirling ft. Lzzy Hale; The Storm by Balázs Havasi	Romans (Ya Tebya Nikogda Ne Zabudu) by Ariana
2014–15	Be Italian (from Nine) performed by Fergie	The Master and Margarita by Igor Kornelyuk	Romans (Ya Tebya Nikogda Ne Zabudu) by Ariana

=== With Martiusheva ===
Season	Short program	Free skating	Exhibition
2013–14	Sarabande performed by Escala choreo. by Sergei Komolov, Alexei Zhelezniakov	Les Feuilles Mortes (Autumn Leaves) performed by André Rieu choreo. by Sergei Komolov, Alexei Zhelezniakov; Milord by Marguerite Monnot	
2012–13	Cornish Rhapsody by Hubert Bath	The Mission by Ennio Morricone	Hello by Lionel Richie
2011–12	Winter by Antonio Vivaldi	Leningrad by William Joseph; Ange et Démon by Maxime Rodriguez	
2010–11	Flamenco by unknown	The Sleeping Beauty by Pyotr Tchaikovsky	Caruso by Lucio Dalla performed by Luciano Pavarotti
2009–10	Flamenco by unknown	The Sleeping Beauty by Pyotr Tchaikovsky	We Are the Champions by Queen
2008–09	Korobushka (Russian folk music) performed by Bond	The Nutcracker by Pyotr Tchaikovsky	Pájaro Campana by Raúl Di Blasio

== Competitive highlights ==
GP: Grand Prix; CS: Challenger Series; JGP: Junior Grand Prix

=== With Astakhova ===
International
Event	2014–15	2015–16	2016–17	2017–18
Olympics				12th
Worlds	10th			8th
Europeans		7th		
GP Cup of China		5th		
GP NHK Trophy				3rd
GP Rostelecom Cup	3rd		3rd	3rd
GP Skate America		7th	5th	
CS Finlandia Trophy			2nd	5th
CS Golden Spin	1st	2nd	2nd	2nd
CS Nepela Trophy		2nd		2nd
CS Volvo Cup	1st			
Shanghai Trophy				4th
Universiade	2nd			
Volvo Open Cup	1st			
National
Russian Champ.	4th	4th	4th	4th

=== With Martiusheva ===
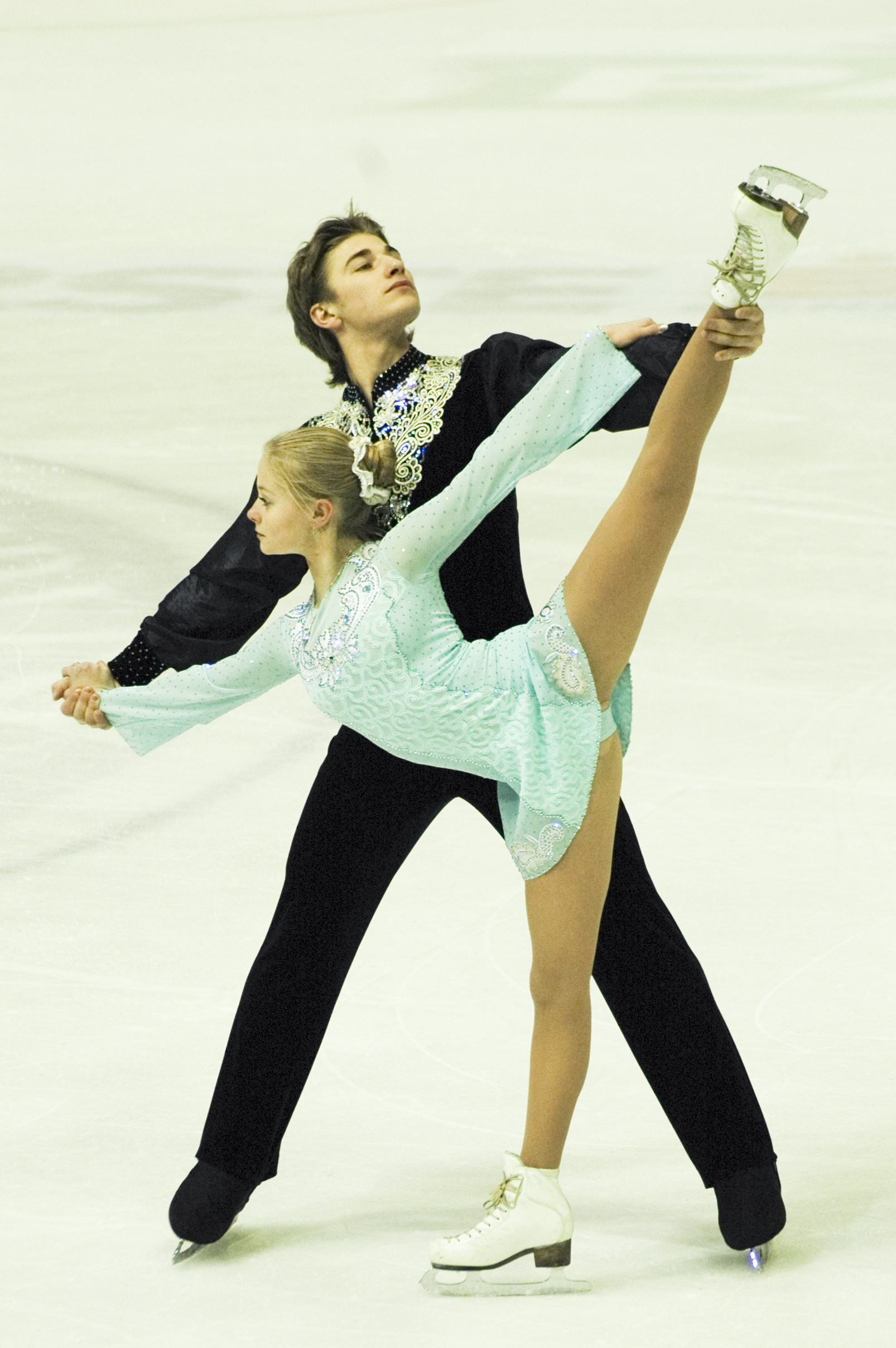
Martiusheva/Rogonov won the 2010 Golden Spin of Zagreb.

International
Event	07–08	08–09	09–10	10–11	11–12	12–13	13–14
GP Cup of China							7th
GP NHK Trophy						5th	7th
GP Rostel. Cup			7th			5th	
GP Skate Canada				WD			
Golden Spin			2nd	1st	1st		
Lombardia Trophy							2nd
Nepela Memorial						1st	2nd
Warsaw Cup					1st		
International: Junior
Junior Worlds		2nd					
JGP Final		4th					
JGP Mexico		3rd					
JGP U.K.		1st					
National
Russian Champ.		6th	9th	9th	3rd	6th	WD
Russian Junior	3rd	1st					

== Detailed results ==
=== With Astakhova ===
2017–18 season
Date	Event	SP	FS	Total
19–25 March 2018	2018 World Championships	7; 71.62	9; 130.54	8; 202.16
14–25 February 2018	2018 Winter Olympics	10; 70.52	13; 123.93	12; 194.45
21–24 December 2017	2018 Russian Championships	4; 69.65	4; 128.76	4; 198.41
6–9 December 2017	2017 CS Golden Spin of Zagreb	2; 66.30	2; 120.32	2; 186.62
24–26 November 2017	2017 Shanghai Trophy	–	4; 125.75	4; 125.75
10–12 November 2017	2017 NHK Trophy	3; 70.47	3; 133.17	3; 203.64
20–22 October 2017	2017 Rostelecom Cup	4; 67.14	3; 131.97	3; 199.11
6–8 October 2017	2017 CS Finlandia Trophy	5; 64.13	5; 112.75	5; 176.88
21–23 September 2017	2017 CS Ondrej Nepela Trophy	1; 67.18	2; 123.94	2; 191.12
2016–17 season
Date	Event	SP	FS	Total
20–26 December 2016	2017 Russian Championships	4; 70.73	4; 128.06	4; 198.79
7–10 December 2016	2016 CS Golden Spin of Zagreb	2; 63.82	1; 116.62	2; 180.44
4–6 November 2016	2016 Rostelecom Cup	4; 65.51	3; 123.23	3; 188.74
21–23 October 2016	2016 Skate America	5; 64.34	6; 110.18	5; 174.52
6–10 October 2016	2016 CS Finlandia Trophy	2; 57.26	2; 111.84	2; 169.10
2015–16 season
Date	Event	SP	FS	Total
26–31 January 2016	2016 European Championships	7; 60.63	7; 114.09	7; 174.72
23–27 December 2015	2016 Russian Championships	4; 71.89	4; 134.50	4; 206.39
2–5 December 2015	2015 CS Golden Spin of Zagreb	2; 65.06	3; 118.82	2; 183.88
6–8 November 2015	2015 Cup of China	6; 59.17	5; 114.19	5; 173.36
23–25 October 2015	2015 Skate America	7; 58.25	8; 99.72	7; 157.97
1–3 October 2015	2015 CS Ondrej Nepela Trophy	3; 60.50	1; 124.50	2; 185.00
2014–15 season
Date	Event	SP	FS	Total
23–29 March 2015	2015 World Championships	13; 55.55	9; 118.03	10; 173.58
4–8 February 2015	2015 Winter Universiade	2; 59.88	2; 114.99	2; 174.87
24–28 December 2014	2015 Russian Championships	6; 57.63	4; 116.89	4; 174.52
4–6 December 2014	2014 CS Golden Spin of Zagreb	1; 56.58	1; 127.66	1; 184.24
14–15 November 2014	2014 Rostelecom Cup	3; 58.34	4; 106.52	3; 164.86
5–9 November 2014	2014 CS Volvo Open Cup	1; 60.28	1; 110.06	1; 170.34
