= Zhang Yan (figure skater) =

Chinese pair skater (born 1988)

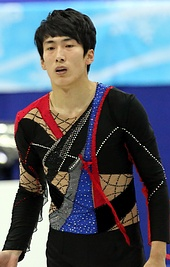

Personal information
- Born: July 8, 1988 (age 38) Qiqihar, China
- Height: 1.85 m (6 ft 1 in)

Figure skating career
- Country: China
- Partner: Wang Wenting
- Coach: Bo Luan
- Skating club: Harbin Training Centre
- Began skating: 1999

Zhang Yan (simplified Chinese: 张岩; traditional Chinese: 張岩; pinyin: Zhāng Yán; born July 8, 1988) is a Chinese pair skater. With partner Wang Wenting, he is the 2013 Chinese national silver medalist.

== Programs ==
(with Wang)

Season	Short program	Free skating
2012–2013	Dracula	Last Samurai

== Competitive highlights ==
(with Wang)

Results
International
Event	2010–11	2011–12	2012–13	2013–14	2014–15
Four Continents			7th	7th	
GP Cup of China			6th		
Universiade					5th
National
Chinese Champ.	5th	4th	2nd	5th	3rd
GP = Grand Prix
