= Andrei Deputat =

Ukrainian-Russian pair skater (born 1992)

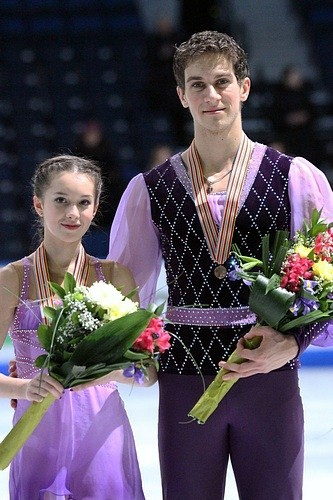
- Deputat at the 2012 World Junior Championships

Personal information
- Full name: Andrei Dmitriyevich Deputat
- Other names: Ukrainian: Andriy Deputat
- Born: 20 December 1992 (age 33) Kyiv, Ukraine
- Height: 1.80 m (5 ft 11 in)

Figure skating career
- Country: Russia
- Coach: Oleg Vasiliev
- Began skating: 1995
Medal record
Representing Russia
Figure skating: Pairs
World Junior Championships
Bronze medal – third place	2012 Minsk	Pairs
Junior Grand Prix Final
Silver medal – second place	2012–13 Sochi	Pairs

Andrei Dmitriyevich Deputat (Russian: Андрей Дмитриевич Депутат; born 20 December 1992) is a Ukrainian-Russian pair skater who has represented Russia internationally since 2012. With former partner Vasilisa Davankova, he is the 2012 World Junior bronze medalist, the 2012–13 JGP Final silver medalist, and the 2012 Russian Junior champion. He later competed with Vera Bazarova.

== Personal life ==
Deputat was born on 20 December 1992 in Kyiv, Ukraine. He moved to Moscow, Russia, in early 2010. He married Russian ice dancer Ekaterina Bobrova on 16 July 2016 in Moscow.

== Early career ==
Deputat's mother, a recreational skater, introduced him to skating at age two years and eight months. He switched from singles to pair skating at age 15 and competed for two seasons with Vladyslava Rybka. They represented Ukraine and were coached by Galina Kukhar in Kyiv. In the summer of 2009, they spent some time training in Ashburn, Virginia with Rashid Kadyrkaev and competed at the Liberty Summer Competition in Aston, Pennsylvania where they won the silver medal. They were ineligible for the 2009–10 ISU Junior Grand Prix series because Rybka turned 12 at the end of July 2009 and they parted ways soon after.

Unable to find him a suitable partner in Ukraine, Kukhar recommended that Deputat move to Moscow. Arriving in Russia in early 2010, Deputat joined Sergei Dobroskokov's group and had a brief partnership with Polina Safronova.

== Partnership with Davankova ==
Deputat and Vasilisa Davankova skated in the same group before teaming up in May 2011.

=== 2011–12 season ===
In December 2011, Davankova/Deputat competed on the senior level at the 2012 Russian Championships. They were seventh in the short program but finished fifth overall, receiving the highest TES in the free skate ahead of the gold medalists Vera Bazarova / Yuri Larionov. In February 2012, they won the gold medal at the 2012 Russian Junior Championships after placing first in both the short and free segments. Deputat was released by Ukraine to represent Russia. Davankova/Deputat won the bronze medal in their international debut at the 2012 World Junior Championships.

=== 2012–13 season ===
Davankova/Deputat won silver at their first JGP event in Lake Placid, New York. At their second event, in Zagreb, Croatia, they took the bronze and qualified for the JGP Final in Sochi, Russia, where they won the silver medal behind Lina Fedorova / Maxim Miroshkin. By that time, Davankova had grown to 1.55 m. Davankova/Deputat finished seventh in their second appearance at the 2013 Russian Championships. In January 2013, Davankova injured her leg at a training session, resulting in the pair withdrawing from the 2013 Russian Junior Championships. She was on crutches for two weeks. In late March, Deputat injured his right leg and decided to undergo a meniscus operation.

=== 2013–14 season ===
Davankova/Deputat began their season by winning bronze at the 2013 JGP Belarus. A silver medal at the 2013 JGP Estonia qualified them to the JGP Final in Fukuoka, Japan. At the final, Davankova/Deputat placed fifth in both segments and overall. At the Russian Championships, the pair finished fifth on the senior level and then won the bronze medal on the junior level. Davankova/Deputat were assigned to the 2014 World Junior Championships in Sofia, Bulgaria, where they finished fourth after placing third in the short program and fifth in the free skate. Their partnership ended because Deputat was struggling with elements as Davankova grew taller.

== Partnership with Bazarova ==
On 9 April 2014, Russian media reported that Deputat and Vera Bazarova would skate together, coached by Oleg Vasiliev. On 16 April, Deputat said their partnership was officially approved by the Russian Figure Skating Federation and they would begin training in Saint Petersburg under Vasiliev. In May, Vasiliev said they would relocate to Moscow and Saransk because of better funding.

=== 2014–15 season ===
Bazarova/Deputat were awarded the bronze medal at the 2014 CS Lombardia Trophy and silver at the International Cup of Nice. They received two Grand Prix assignments, the 2014 Cup of China and 2014 NHK Trophy, and placed 4th at both. The pair finished 5th at the 2015 Russian Championships.

=== 2015–16 season ===
Competing in the 2015–16 Grand Prix series, Bazarova/Deputat finished 5th at the 2015 Skate Canada International finishing 5th and 4th at the 2015 NHK Trophy. In December 2015, the pair placed 6th at the 2016 Russian Championships. In March 2016, they won gold at the inaugural Cup of Tyrol in Innsbruck, Austria.

=== 2016–17 season ===
Bazarova/Deputat withdrew from their 2016–17 Grand Prix assignment, the 2016 Skate Canada International. On 17 November 2016, their coach announced that the partnership had ended and that Deputat was doing tryouts with various skaters, including Alexandra Proklova.

== Programs ==
=== With Bazarova ===
Season	Short program	Free skating	Exhibition
2016–17	Maybe I, Maybe You by the Scorpions	Romeo and Juliet	
2015–16	Nocturne No.2, Op. 9–2 in E flat major by Frédéric Chopin	Medley by The Beatles; Because; Oh! Darling; Come Together; Birthday	
2014–15	My Way by Claude François, Jacques Revaux performed by André Rieu	Adiós Nonino by Astor Piazzolla	Adagio by Lara Fabian

=== With Davankova ===
Season	Short program	Free skating	Exhibition
2013–14	The Godfather by Nino Rota performed by Edvin Marton choreo. by Nikolai Morozov	Notre-Dame de Paris by Riccardo Cocciante	Don't You Remember by Adele
2012–13	The Godfather by Nino Rota performed by Edvin Marton choreo. by Nikolai Morozov	Once Upon a Time in Mexico by Robert Rodriguez choreo. by Irina Zhuk	Something's got a hold on me by Christina Aguilera
2011–12	Flamenco by Didulia	Romeo and Juliet by Nino Rota arranged and performed by Edvin Marton	Ai se eu te pego! performed by Michel Teló

== Competitive highlights ==
GP: Grand Prix; CS: Challenger Series; JGP: Junior Grand Prix

=== With Bazarova ===
International
Event	2014–15	2015–16	2016–17
GP Cup of China	4th		
GP NHK Trophy	4th	4th	
GP Skate Canada		5th	WD
CS Lombardia Trophy	3rd		
Cup of Nice	2nd		
Cup of Tyrol		1st	
Toruń Cup		WD	
Winter Universiade	4th		
National
Russian Champ.	5th	6th	
WD = Withdrew

=== With Davankova ===
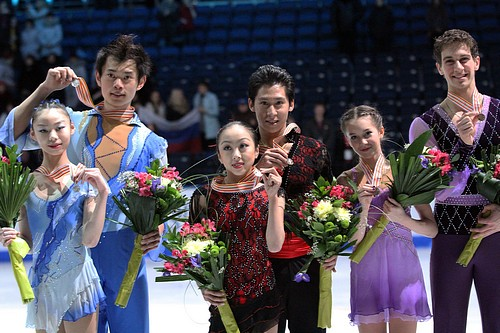
Davankova/Deputat, bronze medalists at the 2012 World Junior Championships

International
Event	2011–12	2012–13	2013–14
Cup of Nice		4th	
International: Junior
World Junior Champ.	3rd		4th
JGP Final		2nd	5th
JGP Belarus			3rd
JGP Croatia		3rd	
JGP Estonia			2nd
JGP United States		2nd	
National
Russian Champ.	5th	7th	5th
Russian Junior Champ.	1st	WD	3rd
WD = Withdrew

== Detailed results ==
Small medals for short and free programs awarded only at ISU Championships.

=== With Bazarova ===
2016–17 season
Date	Event	SP	FS	Total
2015–16 season
Date	Event	SP	FS	Total
9–13 March 2016	2016 Cup of Tyrol	1; 64.91	1; 126.34	1; 191.25
24–27 December 2015	2016 Russian Championships	6; 67.30	6; 126.54	6; 193.84
27–29 November 2015	2015 NHK Trophy	4; 64.06	4; 117.64	4; 181.70
30 October - 1 November 2015	2015 Skate Canada	5; 57.02	6; 99.13	5; 156.15
2014–15 season
Date	Event	SP	FS	Total
4–8 February 2015	2015 Winter Universiade	3; 59.07	4; 104.79	4; 163.86
24–28 December 2014	2015 Russian Championships	4; 60.98	6; 111.75	5; 172.73
28–30 November 2014	2014 NHK Trophy	4; 59.62	4; 106.08	4; 165.70
7–9 November 2014	2014 Cup of China	4; 56.85	4; 109.59	4; 166.44
15–19 October 2014	2014 Cup of Nice	3; 47.46	1; 104.64	2; 152.10
18–21 September 2014	2014 Lombardia Trophy	1; 50.32	3; 80.08	3; 130.40

=== With Davankova ===
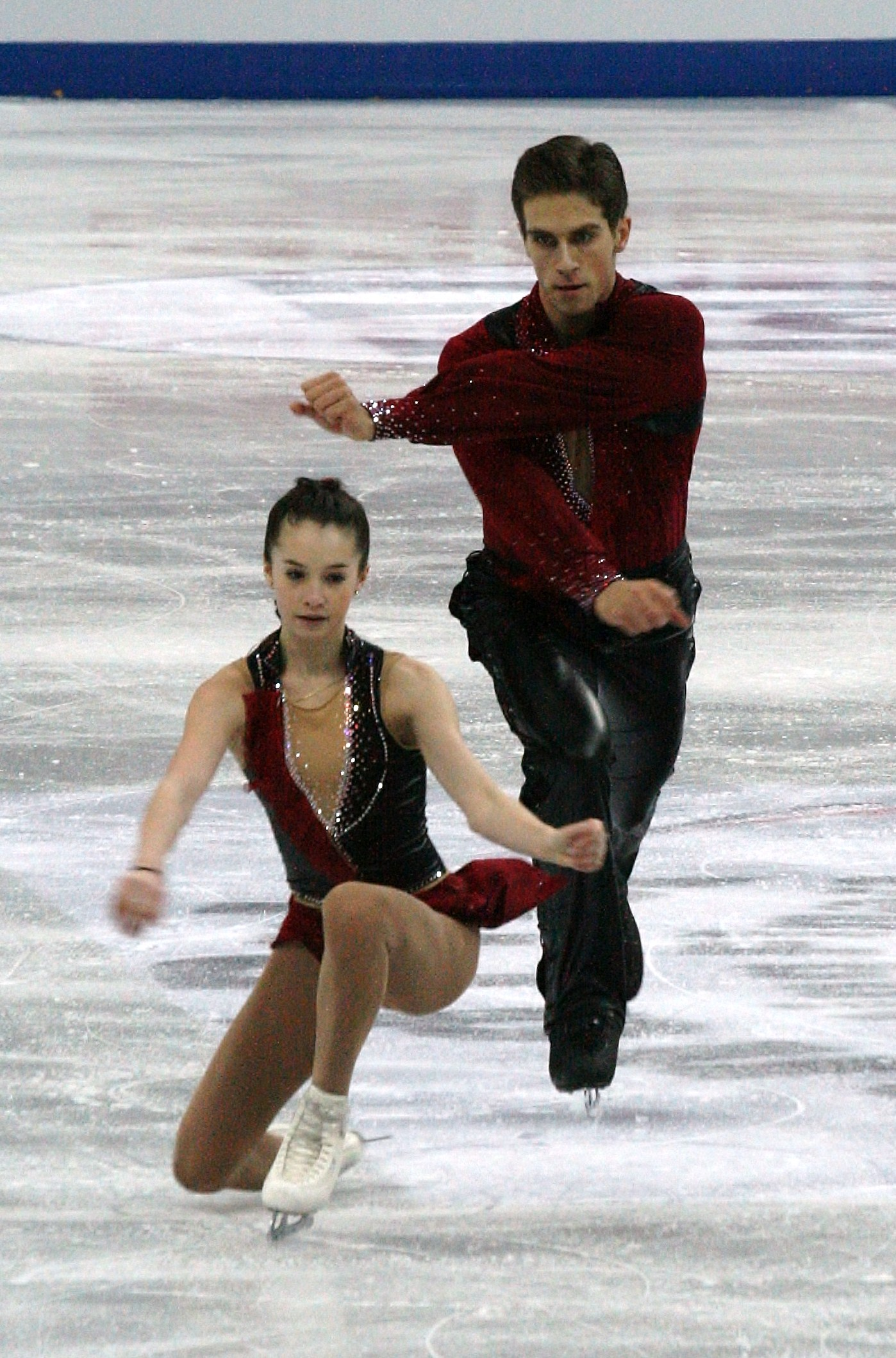
Davankova/Deputat at the 2012–13 JGP Final

2013–14 season
Date	Event	Level	SP	FS	Total
10–16 March 2014	2014 World Junior Championships	Junior	3; 58.35	5; 92.32	4; 150.67
23–25 January 2014	2014 Russian Junior Championships	Junior	2; 63.24	3; 114.30	2; 177.54
24–27 December 2013	2014 Russian Championships	Senior	6; 62.06	6; 111.03	5; 173.09
5–8 December 2013	2013–14 JGP Final	Junior	5; 54.82	5; 96.20	5; 151.02
10–12 October 2013	2013 JGP Estonia	Junior	2; 61.48	2; 99.55	2; 161.03
26–28 September 2013	2013 JGP Belarus	Junior	2; 51.40	5; 79.06	3; 130.46
2012–13 season
Date	Event	Level	SP	FS	Total
25–28 December 2012	2013 Russian Championships	Senior	4; 58.30	9; 103.46	7; 161.76
6–9 December 2012	2012–13 JGP Final	Junior	3; 51.34	2; 104.62	2; 155.96
24–28 October 2012	2012 Coupe de Nice	Senior	2; 50.38	4; 75.16	4; 125.54
4–7 October 2012	2012 JGP Croatia	Junior	2; 50.42	3; 93.20	3; 143.62
30 Aug. – 1 Sept. 2012	2012 JGP USA	Junior	1; 48.97	3; 84.14	2; 133.11
2011–12 season
Date	Event	Level	SP	FS	Total
27 Feb. – 4 March 2012	2012 World Junior Championships	Junior	5; 50.50	3; 103.16	3; 153.66
5–7 February 2012	2012 Russian Junior Championships	Junior	1; 55.06	1; 114.77	1; 169.83
25–29 December 2011	2012 Russian Championships	Senior	7; 53.32	5; 115.47	5; 168.79
