= Vera Bazarova =

Russian pair skater (born 1993)

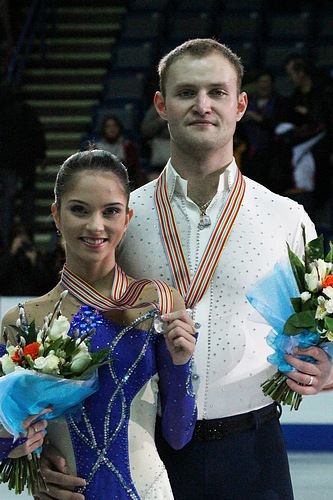
- Bazarova at the 2012 European Championships

Personal information
- Full name: Vera Yevgenyevna Bazarova
- Born: 28 January 1993 (age 33) Yekaterinburg, Russia
- Height: 1.60 m (5 ft 3 in)

Figure skating career
- Country: Russia
- Began skating: 1997
Medal record
Representing Russia
Figure skating: Pairs
European Championships
Silver medal – second place	2012 Sheffield	Pairs
Bronze medal – third place	2011 Bern	Pairs
Bronze medal – third place	2014 Budapest	Pairs
Grand Prix Final
Silver medal – second place	2012–13 Sochi	Pairs
World Junior Championships
Silver medal – second place	2007 Oberstdorf	Pairs

Vera Yevgenyevna Bazarova (Russian: Ве́ра Евге́ньевна База́рова, born 28 January 1993) is a Russian pair skater. With former partner Yuri Larionov, she is the 2012–13 Grand Prix Final silver medalist, a three-time European medalist (silver in 2012; bronze in 2011 and 2014), the 2007 World Junior silver medalist, and the 2012 Russian national champion. They won six senior Grand Prix series medals outside the final, including gold at the 2012 NHK Trophy. After their partnership ended, Bazarova competed with Andrei Deputat.

== Personal life ==
Bazarova was born on 28 January 1993 in Yekaterinburg, Russia. She enrolled at Perm State Pedagogical University, Faculty of Physical Education. She then studied tourism in Yekaterinburg; her father and sister work in tourism.

== Early years on the ice ==
Bazarova began skating in 1997. She trained in Yekaterinburg mostly as a singles skater until the age of 12. At that time, coach Ludmila Kalinina invited her to Perm to train in pair skating.

== Partnership with Larionov ==
=== 2005–09 ===
In spring 2005, Kalinina paired Bazarova with Yuri Larionov. They trained in Perm at the Orlenok Ice Palace until 2011.

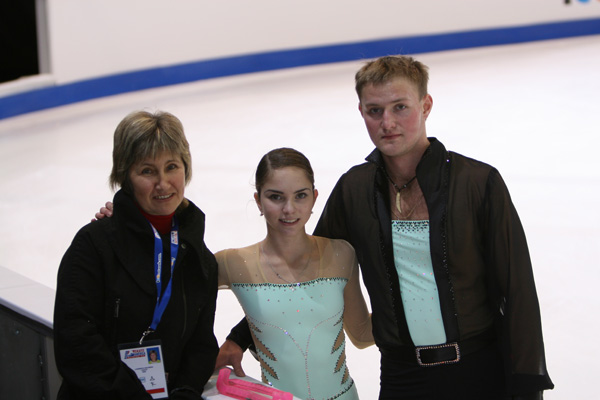
Bazarova/Larionov at the 2007 Skate America with former coach Ludmila Kalinina

Bazarova/Larionov took silver at the 2007 World Junior Championships. In October, they won their first senior international medal when they claimed the bronze at 2007 Skate America. In December of the same year, the pair won gold at the 2007 Junior Grand Prix Final. However, in January 2008, they were disqualified and stripped of the medal due to a doping violation found in a blood sample Larionov gave before the Final. Larionov was also suspended for two years, beginning on 18 January 2008. His sentence was later reduced to 18 months and ended on 17 July 2009. Bazarova decided to wait for Larionov: "There were offers from others, but I said right away that I'm not going to skate with someone else."

=== 2009–10 season ===
Bazarova/Larionov made their return to competition during the 2009–10 season. Their first event was the 2009 Cup of Russia where they placed fourth and they won the bronze medal at Russian Nationals, earning them further assignments. In January 2010, the pair finished 5th at the European Championships. In February, they placed 11th at the Olympics and then completed their season with an 8th-place finish at the World Championships in March. They were named Breakthrough of the Year (pair skating) at the 2010 Crystal Ice Awards held in October 2010 in Moscow.

=== 2010–11 season ===
Bazarova/Larionov began the 2010–11 season with a win at 2010 Nebelhorn Trophy in September. Their first Grand Prix event was the 2010 NHK Trophy in October, where they won the silver medal. At 2010 Trophée Eric Bompard, they won another silver medal, in doing so setting new personal best scores in the short program (64.18) and long program (118.82). Their results qualified them for the Grand Prix Final, their first at the senior level, where they finished fifth. At the Russian Nationals they won their second bronze medal.

At the 2011 European Championships, they won the bronze medal after finishing third in both programs and setting personal best scores in the long program and combined total (188.24). Although many skaters, including those based at other Russian training centers, criticized the freezing conditions at the arena, Bazarova said, "At home in our ice rink in Perm, it can also be very cold so we are kind of used to it." At the 2011 World Championships, they finished 5th.

=== 2011–12 season ===
In June 2011, it was reported that Bazarova/Larionov would move along with their coach, Ludmila Kalinina, from Perm to Saransk. Bazarova said they were comfortable in Saransk, also the host of the 2011 and 2012 Russian national championships. The pair's first event of the 2011–2012 season was Nebelhorn Trophy, where they won silver. They were 5th at 2011 Skate America, their first Grand Prix event of the season. At 2011 Trophée Eric Bompard, they won the silver medal with a new personal best in the free program. Bazarova/Larionov won their first national title at the 2012 Russian Championships. At the 2012 European Championships, they set new personal bests in their short and long programs. They scored a total of 193.79 points overall and won the silver medal. They finished 6th at the 2012 World Championships. Bazarova/Larionov were assigned to represent Team Russia at the 2012 World Team Trophy. They placed first in the pairs event.

=== 2012–13 season ===
Bazarova/Larionov decided to spend more time in Novogorsk (near Moscow) working with former Bolshoi soloist Liudmila Vlasova, who assisted them with interpretation. They withdrew from the 2012 Nebelhorn Trophy after the short program due to a recurring injury to Bazarova's right hip. On November 1, Larionov said the injury did not require an operation. Bazarova said it was not painful but her leg would feel very weak at times and that massage treated the problem effectively.

After taking silver at the 2012 Rostelecom Cup, Bazarova/Larionov won their first Grand Prix title at the 2012 NHK Trophy. They qualified for their second Grand Prix Final. At the final in Sochi, Russia, they won the silver medal with personal best scores in both programs and a total of 201.60 points.

Bazarova/Larionov withdrew from the 2013 Russian Championships. Aleksandr Gorshkov said that Larionov had boot problems and could not endanger his partner. The pair was named in the Russian team to the 2013 European Championships but withdrew due to Larionov's wrist injury which prevented him from doing a number of pairs elements. They were replaced by Ksenia Stolbova / Fedor Klimov. Larionov had an operation in Moscow. On 21 February 2013, Larionov confirmed they were no longer working with Ludmila Kalinina. The pair trained in Novogorsk, Moscow, advised by Viktor Kudriavtsev, in the period leading up to the 2013 World Championships, with a decision on a new main coach likely to be made after the event. Bazarova injured her hip on a fall while training in Detroit before Worlds. They finished 7th at the event.

On 26 March 2013, Bazarova/Larionov announced they would be coached by Nina Mozer. In preparation for the 2013–14 season, the pair began training in Moscow and then travelled with Mozer's group to West Orange, New Jersey in May.

=== 2013–14 season ===
At the start of the season, Bazarova/Larionov considered adding a quadruple twist but decided against it. During the 2013–14 Grand Prix series, they placed fourth at the 2013 Trophee Eric Bompard and then won the silver medal at the 2013 Rostelecom Cup, behind Aliona Savchenko / Robin Szolkowy. After winning the 2013 NRW Trophy, the pair took silver at the 2014 Russian Championships, losing by a margin of 0.45 to Ksenia Stolbova / Fedor Klimov. At the 2014 European Championships, Bazarova/Larionov won the bronze medal, again finishing behind Stolbova/Klimov.

In February 2014, Bazarova/Larionov appeared at their second Olympics, in Sochi. They were not selected for the team event but did compete in the separate pairs event, placing sixth. The next month, they competed at the 2014 World Championships in Saitama, Japan. During the free skate, Larionov stumbled while setting Bazarova down from a lift but they avoided injury and finished seventh overall. Later that day, 27 March 2014, he told Bazarova that he wanted to end their partnership. Nina Mozer made the split public several days later.

== Partnership with Deputat ==
On 9 April 2014, it was reported that Bazarova and Andrei Deputat would skate together, coached by Oleg Vasiliev. On 16 April, Deputat said their partnership was officially approved by the Russian Figure Skating Federation and they would begin training in Saint Petersburg under Vasiliev. In May, Vasiliev said they would relocate to Moscow and Saransk because of better funding.

=== 2014–15 season ===
Bazarova/Deputat were awarded the bronze medal at the 2014 CS Lombardia Trophy and silver at the International Cup of Nice. They received two Grand Prix assignments, the 2014 Cup of China and 2014 NHK Trophy, and placed 4th at both. The pair finished 5th at the 2015 Russian Championships.

=== 2015–16 season ===
Competing in the 2015–16 Grand Prix series, Bazarova/Deputat finished 5th at the 2015 Skate Canada International finishing 5th and 4th at the 2015 NHK Trophy. In December 2015, the pair placed 6th at the 2016 Russian Championships. In March 2016, they won gold at the inaugural Cup of Tyrol in Innsbruck, Austria.

=== 2016–17 season ===
Bazarova/Deputat withdrew from their 2016–17 Grand Prix assignment, the 2016 Skate Canada International. On 17 November 2016, Bazarova confirmed reports that they had parted ways but decided to leave a decision on whether to continue her competitive career until after the New Year.

== Programs ==
=== With Deputat ===
Season	Short program	Free skating	Exhibition
2016–17	Maybe I, Maybe You by the Scorpions	Romeo and Juliet	
2015–16	Nocturne No.2, Op. 9–2 in E flat major by Frédéric Chopin	Medley by The Beatles; Because; Oh! Darling; Come Together; Birthday	
2014–15	My Way by Claude François, Jacques Revaux performed by André Rieu	Adiós Nonino by Astor Piazzolla	Adagio by Lara Fabian

=== With Larionov ===
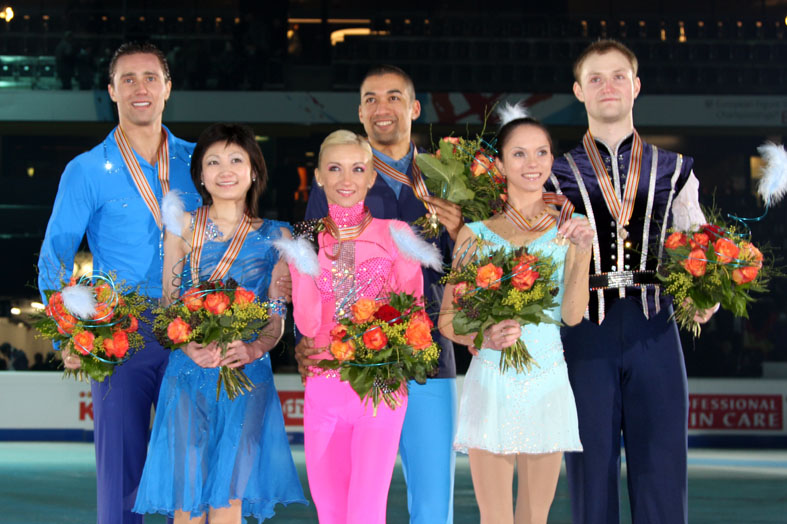
Bazarova/Larionov at the 2011 European Championships

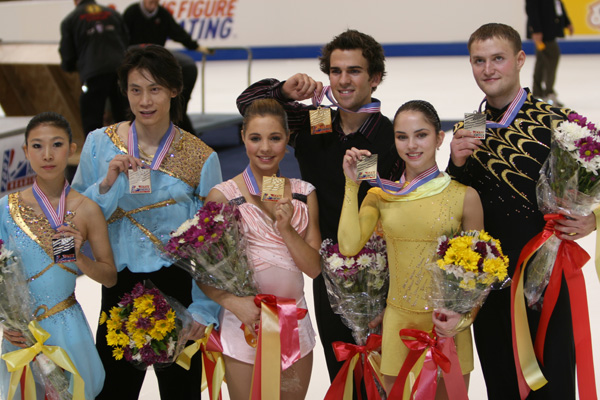
Bazarova/Larionov at the 2007 Skate America

Season	Short program	Free skating	Exhibition
2013–14	Titine (from Modern Times) by Charlie Chaplin performed by Stanley Black; Paris by Night: Je cherche après Titine (modern arrangement) by Bob Sinclar choreo. by Nikolai Morozov	Polovtsian Dances (from Prince Igor) by Alexander Borodin	Tosca by Giacomo Puccini
2012–13	Liebestraum by Franz Liszt choreo. by Tatiana Tarasova	Spartacus by Aram Khachaturian choreo. by Igor Shpilband, Marina Zueva	Remember (from Troy) by Josh Groban, Tanja Carovska
2011–12	Tosca by Giacomo Puccini arranged by Maxime Rodriguez	Doctor Zhivago by Maurice Jarre	Remember (from Troy) by Josh Groban, Tanja Carovska
2010–11	Adagio by Secret Garden	The Man in the Iron Mask by Nick Glennie-Smith	Remember (from Troy) by Josh Groban, Tanja Carovska
2009–10	Sadness (Грусть) (from Satisfaktsiya (Сатисфакция)) by Igor Kamensky	Seven Years in Tibet by John Williams; The Story of Voyages by Alfred Schnittke	Remember (from Troy) by Josh Groban, Tanja Carovska
2007–08	Shadowboxing by Alexei Shelygin	Eragon by Patrick Doyle	
2006–07	Love Story by Francis Lai	Amélie by Yann Tiersen	

== Competitive highlights ==
GP: Grand Prix; CS: Challenger Series; JGP: Junior Grand Prix

=== With Deputat ===
International
Event	2014–15	2015–16	2016–17
GP Cup of China	4th		
GP NHK Trophy	4th	4th	
GP Skate Canada		5th	WD
CS Lombardia Trophy	3rd		
Cup of Nice	2nd		
Cup of Tyrol		1st	
Winter Universiade	4th		
National
Russian Champ.	5th	6th	
WD = Withdrew

=== With Larionov ===
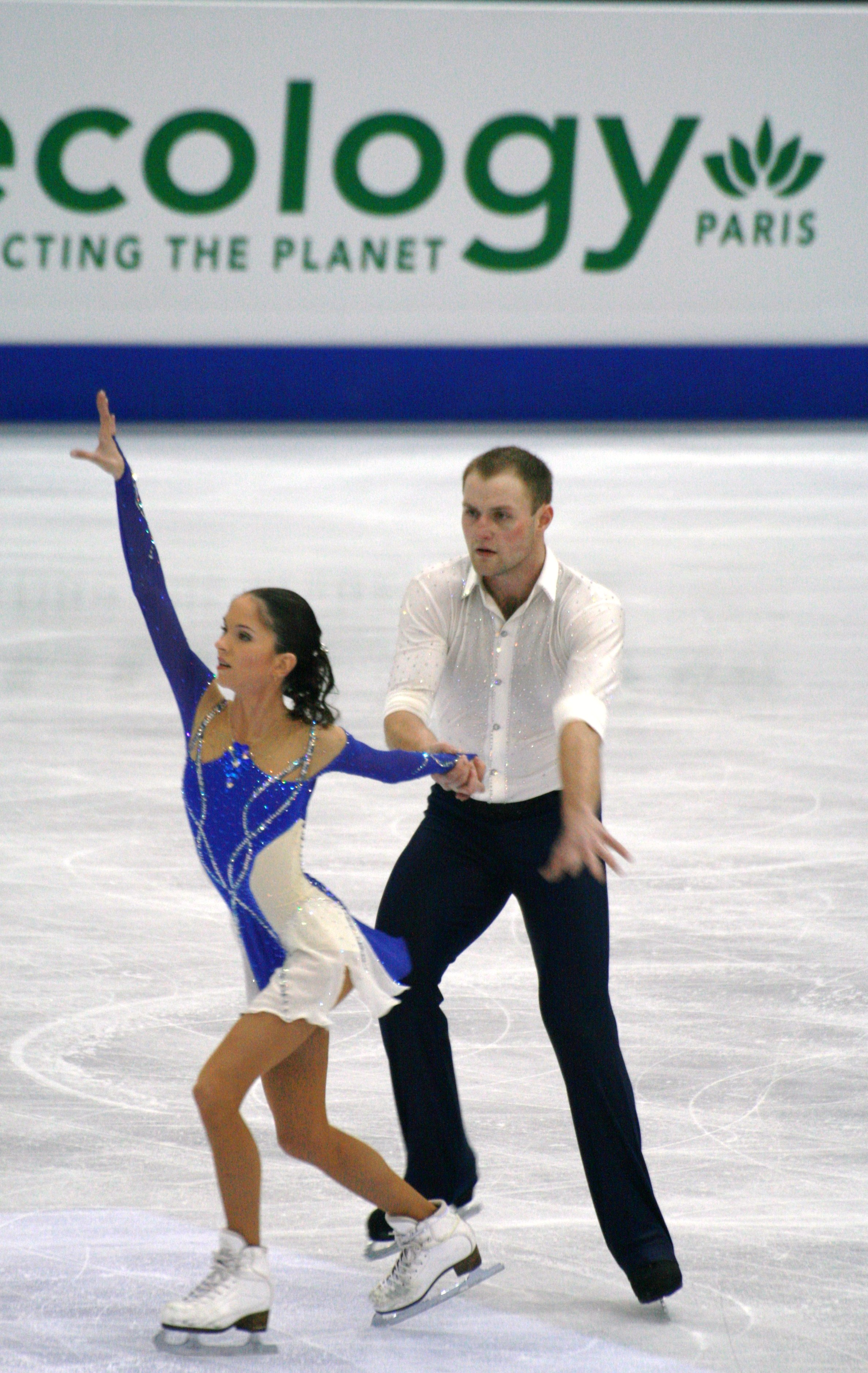
Bazarova/Larionov at the 2012 World Team Trophy

International
Event	06–07	07–08	09–10	10–11	11–12	12–13	13–14
Olympics			11th				6th
World Champ.			8th	5th	6th	7th	7th
European Champ.			5th	3rd	2nd	WD	3rd
GP Final				5th		2nd	
GP Bompard				2nd	2nd		4th
GP NHK Trophy				2nd		1st	
GP Rostelecom Cup			4th			2nd	2nd
GP Skate America		3rd			5th		
Nebelhorn Trophy				1st	2nd	WD	
NRW Trophy							1st
International: Junior
World Junior Champ.	2nd						
JGP Final	7th	DSQ					
JGP Germany		2nd					
JGP Norway	4th						
JGP Taiwan	2nd						
JGP United Kingdom		1st					
National
Russian Champ.	7th	6th	3rd	3rd	1st	WD	2nd
Russian Jr. Champ.	2nd						
Team events
World Team Trophy					5th T 1st P		
DSQ = Disqualified; WD = Withdrew; T = Team result; P = Personal result. Medals awarded for team result only. Bazarova/Larionov did not compete in the 2008–09 season.

== Detailed results ==
Small medals for short and free programs awarded only at ISU Championships. At team events, medals awarded for combined team results only.

=== With Deputat ===
2015–16 season
Date	Event	SP	FS	Total
9–13 March 2016	2016 Cup of Tyrol	1; 64.91	1; 126.34	1; 191.25
24–27 December 2015	2016 Russian Championships	6; 67.30	6; 126.54	6; 193.84
27–29 November 2015	2015 NHK Trophy	4; 64.06	4; 117.64	4; 181.70
30 October - 1 November 2015	2015 Skate Canada	5; 57.02	6; 99.13	5; 156.15
2014-15 season
Date	Event	SP	FS	Total
4–8 February 2015	2015 Winter Universiade	3; 59.07	4; 104.79	4; 163.86
24–28 December 2014	2015 Russian Championships	4; 60.98	6; 111.75	5; 172.73
28–30 November 2014	2014 NHK Trophy	4; 59.62	4; 106.08	4; 165.70
7–9 November 2014	2014 Cup of China	4; 56.85	4; 109.59	4; 166.44
15–19 October 2014	2014 Cup of Nice	3; 47.46	1; 104.64	2; 152.10
18–21 September 2014	2014 Lombardia Trophy	1; 50.32	3; 80.08	3; 130.40

=== With Larionov ===
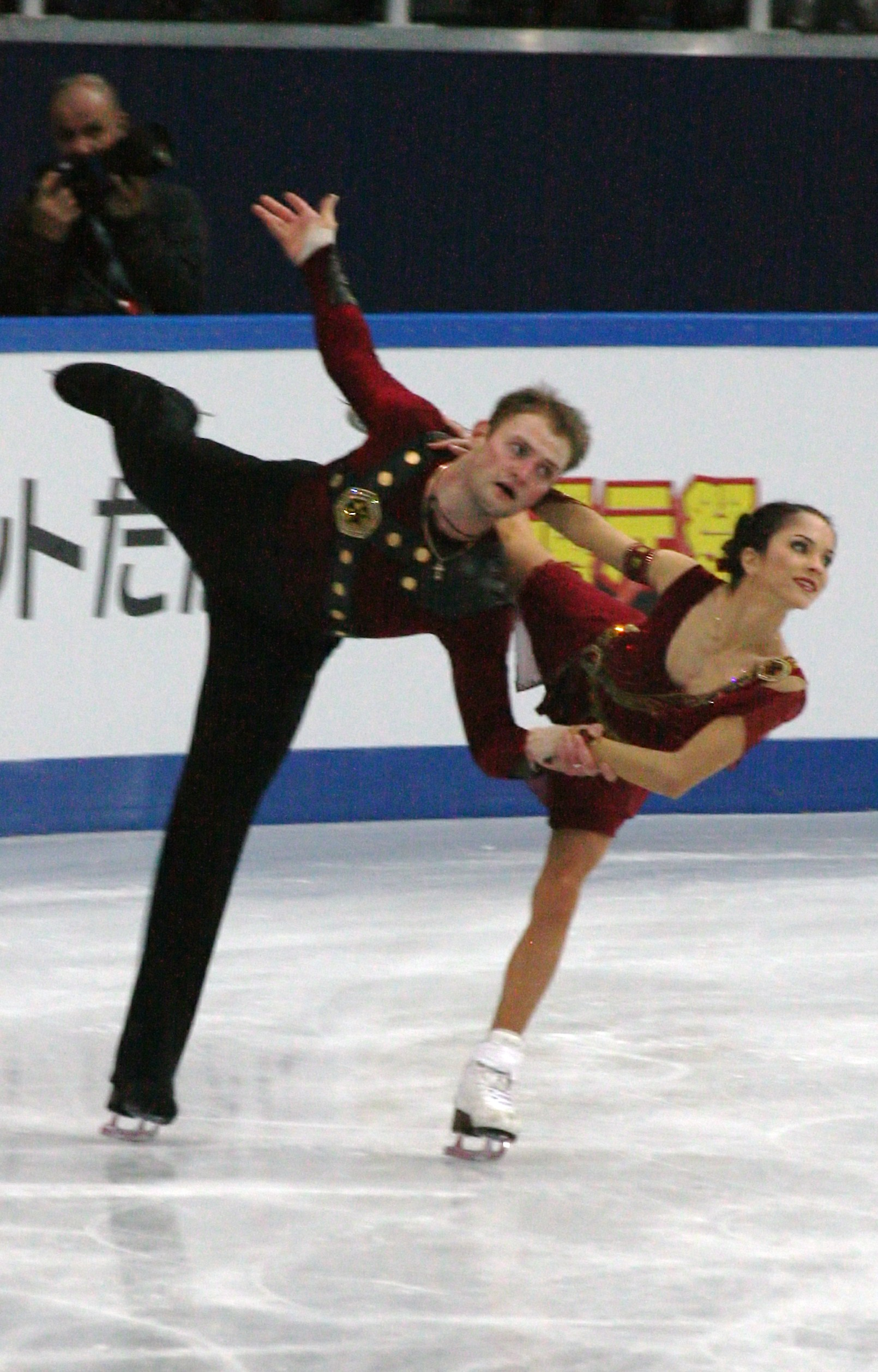
Bazarova/Larionov at the 2012 Grand Prix Final

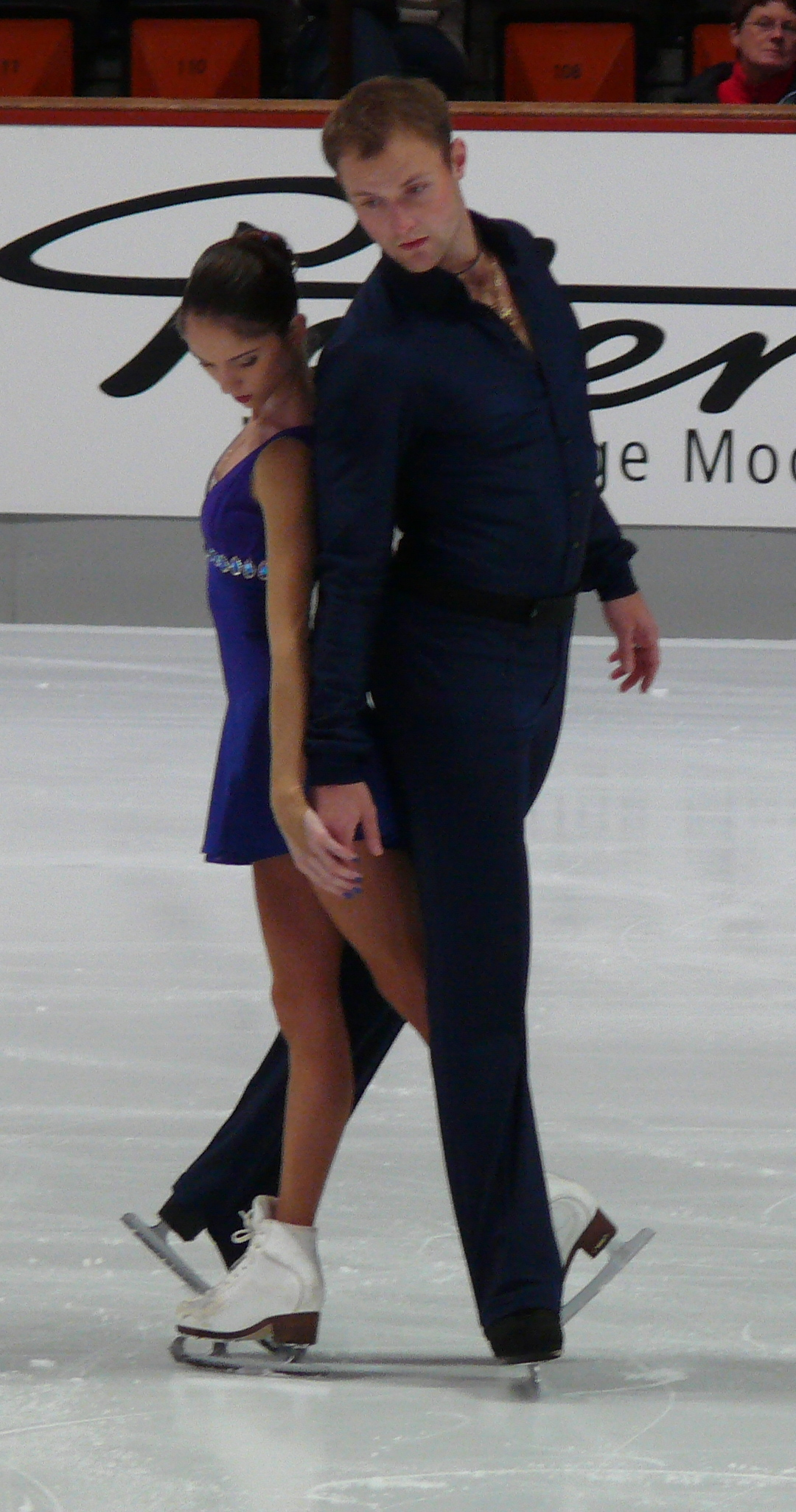
Bazarova/Larionov at the 2012 Nebelhorn Trophy

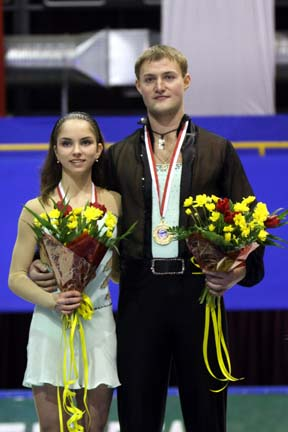
Bazarova/Larionov at the 2007 JGP Final

2013–2014 season
Date	Event	SP	FS	Total
26–27 March 2014	2014 World Championships	7; 67.41	6; 122.03	7; 189.44
11–12 February 2014	2014 Winter Olympics	8; 69.66	6; 129.94	6; 199.60
15–19 January 2014	2014 European Championships	3; 71.70	3; 129.91	3; 201.61
24–26 December 2013	2014 Russian Championships	2; 75.08	1; 138.94	2; 214.02
4–8 December 2013	2013 NRW Trophy	1; 63.05	1; 115.70	1; 178.75
23–24 November 2013	2013 Rostelecom Cup	2; 69.72	2; 131.89	2; 201.61
15–17 November 2013	2013 Trophée Eric Bompard	3; 65.67	5; 114.40	4; 180.07
2012–2013 season
Date	Event	SP	FS	Total
13–15 March 2013	2013 World Championships	7; 61.91	6; 122.81	7; 184.72
6–9 December 2012	2012–13 Grand Prix Final	2; 70.14	1; 131.46	2; 201.60
22–25 November 2012	2012 NHK Trophy	1; 65.61	1; 126.41	1; 192.02
8–11 November 2012	2012 Rostelecom Cup	2; 66.02	2; 125.06	2; 191.08
2011–2012 season
Date	Event	SP	FS	Total
18–22 April 2012	2012 World Team Trophy	2; 62.02	1; 118.68	5T/1P; 180.70
26–30 March 2012	2012 World Championships	4; 65.02	7; 118.66	6; 183.68
25–26 January 2012	2012 European Championships	2; 66.89	2; 126.90	2; 193.79
25–29 December 2011	2012 Russian Championships	1; 68.83	1; 126.03	1; 194.86
18–20 November 2011	2011 Trophée Eric Bompard	3; 59.06	2; 125.85	2; 184.91
21–23 October 2011	2011 Skate America	3; 59.62	5; 114.32	5; 173.94
21–24 September 2011	2011 Nebelhorn Trophy	4; 52.50	2; 112.73	2; 165.23
2010–2011 season
Date	Event	SP	FS	Total
27–28 April 2011	2011 World Championships	4; 64.64	5; 122.49	5; 187.13
26–27 January 2011	2011 European Championships	3; 62.89	3; 125.35	3; 188.24
26–29 December 2010	2011 Russian Championships	3; 67.83	3; 127.94	3; 195.77
9–12 December 2010	2010–11 Grand Prix Final	3; 63.86	5; 112.94	5; 176.80
26–28 November 2010	2010 Trophée Eric Bompard	2; 64.18	2; 118.82	2; 183.00
22–24 October 2010	2010 NHK Trophy	2; 60.16	2; 113.67	2; 173.83
23–26 September 2010	2010 Nebelhorn Trophy	1; 57.30	1; 108.00	1; 165.30
2009–2010 season
Date	Event	SP	FS	Total
23–24 March 2010	2010 World Championships	7; 59.78	7; 112.26	8; 172.04
14–15 February 2010	2010 Winter Olympics	12; 56.54	11; 106.96	11; 163.50
19–20 January 2010	2010 European Championships	5; 55.84	6; 104.00	5; 159.84
23–27 December 2009	2010 Russian Championships	3; 62.26	3; 127.94	3; 195.77
22–25 October 2009	2009 Rostelecom Cup	4; 54.42	3; 101.86	4; 156.28
2007–2008 season
Date	Event	SP	FS	Total
3–7 January 2008	2008 Russian Championships	3; 57.47	6; 91.26	6; 148.73
6–9 December 2007	2007–08 JGP Final	1; 58.45	1; 98.90	DQ; 157.35
25–28 October 2007	2007 Skate America	3; 56.76	3; 102.82	3; 159.58
18–21 October 2007	2007 JGP Great Britain	1; 51.85	1; 87.47	1; 139.32
10–13 October 2007	2007 JGP Germany	1; 51.33	2; 77.46	2; 128.79
2006–2007 season
Date	Event	SP	FS	Total
27 Feb. – 4 March 2007	2007 World Junior Championships	2; 55.06	3; 92.25	2; 147.31
1–4 February 2007	2007 Russian Junior Championships	–	–	2; 143.58
4–7 January 2007	2007 Russian Championships	–	–	7; 137.53
7–10 December 2006	2006–07 JGP Final	4; 47.37	8; 77.79	7; 125.16
11–14 October 2006	2006 JGP Taipei	1; 48.95	2; 86.83	2; 135.78
27 Sept. – 1 Oct. 2006	2006 JGP Norway	6; 40.97	3; 75.49	4; 116.46
