= 2014 NHK Trophy =

- Type: Grand Prix
- Date: November 28 – 30
- Season: 2014–15
- Location: Osaka
- Host: Japan Skating Federation
- Venue: Namihaya Dome

Champions
- Men's singles: (Japan) Daisuke Murakami
- Ladies' singles: (United States) Gracie Gold
- Pairs: (Canada) Meagan Duhamel / Eric Radford
- Ice dance: (Canada) Kaitlyn Weaver / Andrew Poje
- Previous: 2013 NHK Trophy
- Next: 2015 NHK Trophy
- Previous Grand Prix: 2014 Trophée Éric Bompard
- Next Grand Prix: 2014–15 Grand Prix Final

The 2014 NHK Trophy was the final event of six in the 2014–15 ISU Grand Prix of Figure Skating, a senior-level international invitational competition series. It was held at the Namihaya Dome in Osaka on November 28–30. Medals were awarded in the disciplines of men's singles, ladies' singles, pair skating, and ice dancing. Skaters earned points toward qualifying for the 2014–15 Grand Prix Final.

== Entries ==
The entries were as follows:

Country	Men	Ladies	Pairs	Ice dancing
Canada	Elladj Balde; Jeremy Ten	Gabrielle Daleman	Meagan Duhamel / Eric Radford	Kaitlyn Weaver / Andrew Poje
China		Li Zijun	Yu Xiaoyu / Jin Yang	
Georgia		Elene Gedevanishvili		
Germany			Mari Vartmann / Aaron van Cleave	Nelli Zhiganshina / Alexander Gazsi
United Kingdom				Penny Coomes / Nicholas Buckland
Italy	Ivan Righini			
Japan	Yuzuru Hanyu; Takahito Mura; Daisuke Murakami	Riona Kato; Satoko Miyahara; Kanako Murakami	Narumi Takahashi / Ryuichi Kihara	Emi Hirai / Marien de la Asuncion; Cathy Reed / Chris Reed
Norway		Anne Line Gjersem		
South Korea	Kim Jin-seo			
Russia	Sergei Voronov	Alena Leonova	Vera Bazarova / Andrei Deputat; Yuko Kavaguti / Alexander Smirnov	Ksenia Monko / Kirill Khaliavin; Victoria Sinitsina / Nikita Katsalapov
Switzerland		Anna Ovcharova		
United States	Jeremy Abbott; Joshua Farris; Ross Miner	Polina Edmunds; Christina Gao; Gracie Gold	DeeDee Leng / Simon Shnapir	Kaitlin Hawayek / Jean-Luc Baker

=== Changes to preliminary assignments ===
- On July 10, Felicia Zhang and Nathan Bartholomay were removed from the roster. On July 15, it was announced that Mari Vartmann / Aaron van Cleave had been named as replacements. On July 16, it was revealed that Zhang/Bartholomay had split up.
- On August 12, Daisuke Murakami, Riona Kato, and Emi Hirai / Marien de la Asuncion were added as host picks.
- On September 29, Julia Antipova / Nodari Maisuradze were removed from the roster, due to Antipova being hospitalized due to anorexia. On October 8, Arina Cherniavskaia / Antonio Souza-Kordeyru were announced as their replacements.
- On October 9, Guan Jinlin was removed from the roster. No reason has been given. On October 23, Jeremy Ten was announced as his replacement.
- On October 14, Nikol Gosviani was removed from the roster. No reason has been given. On October 30, Elene Gedevanishvili was announced as he replacement.
- On October 27, Kevin Reynolds withdrew due to an injury. On October 30, Jorik Hendrickx was announced as his replacement.
- On October 29, it was reported by the German Skating Union that Peter Liebers was withdrawing. He was officially removed on October 30. On November 11, Elladj Balde was announced as his replacement.
- On November 9, it was reported that Adelina Sotnikova withdrew due to a torn ankle ligament. She was officially removed from the roster on November 11. On November 17, Anne Line Gjersem was announced as her replacement.
- On November 24, Jorik Hendrickx and Arina Cherniavskaia / Antonio Souza-Kordeyru were removed from the roster. No replacements have been announced.

== Results ==
=== Men ===
Rank	Name	Nation	Total points	SP		FS	
1	Daisuke Murakami	Japan	246.07	3	79.68	1	166.39
2	Sergei Voronov	Russia	236.65	4	78.93	2	157.72
3	Takahito Mura	Japan	234.44	1	86.28	4	148.16
4	Yuzuru Hanyu	Japan	229.80	5	78.01	3	151.79
5	Jeremy Abbott	United States	229.65	2	81.51	5	148.14
6	Elladj Baldé	Canada	212.50	7	67.50	6	145.00
7	Ross Miner	United States	205.36	10	63.36	7	142.00
8	Jeremy Ten	Canada	203.27	8	65.81	8	137.46
9	Kim Jin-seo	South Korea	197.20	9	65.69	9	131.51
10	Ivan Righini	Italy	196.22	6	70.27	10	125.95
11	Joshua Farris	United States	169.88	11	58.35	11	111.53

=== Ladies ===
Rank	Name	Nation	Total points	SP		FS	
1	Gracie Gold	United States	191.16	1	68.16	1	123.00
2	Alena Leonova	Russia	186.40	2	68.11	3	118.29
3	Satoko Miyahara	Japan	179.02	4	60.69	2	118.33
4	Kanako Murakami	Japan	173.09	3	64.38	7	108.71
5	Riona Kato	Japan	168.38	8	50.87	4	117.51
6	Gabrielle Daleman	Canada	164.74	7	53.46	6	111.28
7	Li Zijun	China	162.90	5	56.44	8	106.46
8	Polina Edmunds	United States	161.79	11	48.96	5	112.83
9	Christina Gao	United States	147.51	6	54.86	10	92.65
10	Elene Gedevanishvili	Georgia	142.96	9	50.18	9	92.78
11	Anna Ovcharova	Switzerland	132.32	12	45.83	11	86.49
12	Anne Line Gjersem	Norway	125.17	10	49.09	12	76.08

=== Pairs ===
Rank	Name	Nation	Total points	SP		FS	
1	Meagan Duhamel / Eric Radford	Canada	199.78	1	72.70	1	127.08
2	Yuko Kavaguti / Alexander Smirnov	Russia	183.60	2	64.60	3	119.00
3	Yu Xiaoyu / Jin Yang	China	182.00	3	60.15	2	121.85
4	Vera Bazarova / Andrei Deputat	Russia	165.70	4	59.62	4	106.08
5	Mari Vartmann / Aaron Van Cleave	Germany	145.36	5	48.39	5	96.97
6	DeeDee Leng / Simon Shnapir	United States	138.24	6	45.91	6	92.33
7	Narumi Takahashi / Ryuichi Kihara	Japan	131.26	7	45.35	7	85.91

=== Ice dancing ===
Rank	Name	Nation	Total points	SD		FD	
1	Kaitlyn Weaver / Andrew Poje	Canada	169.42	1	67.51	1	101.91
2	Ksenia Monko / Kirill Khaliavin	Russia	152.54	3	59.70	2	92.84
3	Kaitlin Hawayek / Jean-Luc Baker	United States	146.41	4	58.50	3	87.91
4	Nelli Zhiganshina / Alexander Gazsi	Germany	138.41	6	54.13	4	84.28
5	Penny Coomes / Nicholas Buckland	United Kingdom	137.88	2	60.49	6	77.39
6	Cathy Reed / Chris Reed	Japan	130.88	7	50.55	5	80.33
7	Victoria Sinitsina / Nikita Katsalapov	Russia	122.31	5	54.94	8	67.37
8	Emi Hirai / Marien de la Asuncion	Japan	112.04	8	44.38	7	67.66
