= Wang Wenting =

Chinese pair skater

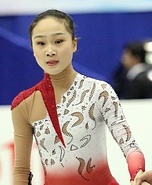
- Wang Wenting at the Four Continents Championships in 2013

Personal information
- Born: February 3, 1997 (age 29) Harbin, China
- Height: 1.60 m (5 ft 3 in)

Figure skating career
- Country: China
- Partner: Zhang Yan
- Coach: Bo Luan
- Skating club: Harbin Training Centre
- Began skating: 2004

Wang Wenting (Chinese: 王文婷; pinyin: Wáng Wéntíng; born February 3, 1997) is a Chinese pair skater. With partner Zhang Yan, she was the 2013 Chinese national silver medalist.

== Programs ==
(with Zhang)

| Season | Short program | Free skating |
|---|---|---|
| 2012–2013 | Dracula choreo. by Zhang Wei | Last Samurai choreo. by Zhang Wei |

== Competitive highlights ==
(with Zhang)

Results
International
| Event | 2010–11 | 2011–12 | 2012–13 | 2013–14 | 2014–15 |
|---|---|---|---|---|---|
| Four Continents | | | 7th | 7th | |
| GP Cup of China | | | 6th | | |
| Universiade | | | | | 5th |
National
| Chinese Champ. | 5th | 4th | 2nd | 5th | 3rd |
GP = Grand Prix
