= 2014–15 figure skating season =

Competitive figure skating year, 2014/7/1 to 2015/6/30

- Date: July 1, 2014 – June 30, 2015
- Previous: 2013–14
- Next: 2015–16

The 2014–15 figure skating season began on July 1, 2014, and ended on June 30, 2015. During this season, elite skaters competed at the 2015 European Championships, Four Continents Championships, World Junior Championships, and World Championships. They also competed at elite events such as the Grand Prix series and Junior Grand Prix series, culminating at the Grand Prix Final, and the inaugural Challenger Series.

Beginning with this season, singles and pairs skaters were allowed to use music with lyrics in competition. Previously, they were restricted to instrumental music, including vocals without words. Additionally, the Challenger Series, a series of senior international competitions below the Grand Prix series, was introduced this season.

== Age eligibility ==
Beginning with this season, the minimum age for senior events increased from 14 to 15 to match the minimum age for International Skating Union (ISU) Championship events. Skaters competing at the junior level were required to be at least 13 years of age before July 1, 2014. Those who turned 15 before that date were also eligible for all senior-level events. These rules may not have applied to non-ISU events such as national championships.

Level	Date of birth
Junior (females in all disciplines; males in singles)	Born between July 1, 1995 & June 30, 2000
Junior (males in pairs & ice dance)	Born between July 1, 1993 & June 30, 2000
Senior (all disciplines)	Born before July 1, 1999

== Changes ==
If skaters of different nationalities formed a team, the ISU required that they choose one country to represent. The date provided is the date when the change occurred or, if not available, the date when the change was announced.

=== Partnership changes ===
Date	Skaters	Disc.	Type	Ref.
July 2, 2014	(Italy) Stefania Berton / Ondrej Hotarek	Pairs	Dissolved	
July 6, 2014	(Israel) Isabella Tobias / Ilia Tkachenko	Ice dance	Formed	
July 16, 2014	(United States) Felicia Zhang / Nathan Bartholomay	Pairs	Dissolved	
July 16, 2014	(France) Daria Popova / Andrei Novoselov	Pairs	Formed	
July 28, 2014	(France) Estelle Elizabeth / Romain Le Gac	Ice dance	Dissolved	
July 28, 2014	(France) Marie-Jade Lauriault / Romain Le Gac	Ice dance	Formed	
July 29, 2014	(France) Lorenza Alessandrini / Pierre Souquet	Ice dance	Formed	
August 7, 2014	(United States) Gretchen Donlan / Andrew Speroff	Pairs	Dissolved	
August 7, 2014	(United States) Gretchen Donlan / Nathan Bartholomay	Pairs	Formed	
October 6, 2014	(Russia) Sofia Biryukova / Aleksandr Stepanov	Pairs	Formed	
February 1, 2014	(United States) Isabella Cannuscio / Michael Bramante	Ice dance	Dissolved	
January 30, 2015	(United States) Alexandra Aldridge / Daniel Eaton	Ice dance	Dissolved	
March 3, 2015	(Canada) Nicole Orford / Thomas Williams	Ice dance	Dissolved	
March 17, 2015	(United States) Danielle Thomas / Daniel Eaton	Ice dance	Formed	
March 25, 2015	(Germany) Nelli Zhiganshina / Alexander Gazsi	Ice dance	Dissolved	
March 31, 2015	(Japan) Narumi Takahashi / Ryuichi Kihara	Pairs	Dissolved	
April 19, 2015	(Japan) Cathy Reed / Chris Reed	Ice dance	Dissolved	
May 28, 2015	(Canada) Hayleigh Bell / Rudi Swiegers	Pairs	Formed	
May 30, 2015	(Russia) Maria Vigalova / Egor Zakroev	Pairs	Dissolved	
June 1, 2015	(Russia) Natalja Zabijako / Yuri Larionov	Pairs	Dissolved	
June 1, 2015	(Russia) Vasilisa Davankova / Alexander Enbert	Pairs	Dissolved	
June 1, 2015	(Russia) Natalja Zabijako / Alexander Enbert	Pairs	Formed	
June 5, 2015	(Russia) Maria Stavitskaia / Anton Shibnev	Ice dance	Formed	
June 17, 2015	(Japan) Kana Muramoto / Chris Reed	Ice dance	Formed	
June 17, 2015	(Japan) Miu Suzaki / Ryuichi Kihara	Pairs	Formed	
June 24, 2015	(Italy) Bianca Manacorda / Niccolò Macii	Pairs	Dissolved	
June 24, 2015	(Israel) Allison Reed / Vasili Rogov	Ice dance	Dissolved	
June 26, 2015	(Canada) Nicole Orford / Asher Hill	Ice dance	Formed	
June 26, 2015	(Canada) Mackenzie Bent / Dmitre Razgulajevs	Ice dance	Formed	
June 30, 2015	(United States) DeeDee Leng / Simon Shnapir	Pairs	Dissolved	

=== Retirements ===
Date	Skater(s)	Disc.	Ref.
July 16, 2014	(United States) Felicia Zhang	Pairs	
August 6, 2014	(Russia) Vladislav Sesganov	Men	
September 16, 2014	(Russia) Polina Shelepen	Ladies	
October 14, 2014	(Japan) Daisuke Takahashi	Men	
November 1, 2014	(France) Yrétha Silété	Ladies	
November 3, 2014	(China) Zhang Kexin	Ladies	
November 13, 2014	(Japan) Fumie Suguri	Ladies	
December 28, 2014	(Japan) Tatsuki Machida	Men	
March 25. 2014	(Germany) Alexander Gazsi	Ice dance	
March 28, 2015	(China) Pang Qing / Tong Jian	Pairs	
April 8, 2015	(Sweden) Viktoria Helgesson	Ladies	
April 9, 2015	(Switzerland) Eveline Brunner	Ladies	
April 14, 2015	(Switzerland) Anna Ovcharova	Ladies	
April 18, 2015	(Denmark) Justus Strid	Men	
April 19, 2015	(Japan) Cathy Reed	Ice dance	
May 11, 2015	(United States) Samantha Cesario	Ladies	
May 13, 2015	(Finland) Henna Lindholm / Ossi Kanervo	Ice dance	
May 18, 2015	(Russia) Polina Agafonova	Ladies	
May 19, 2015	(United States) Douglas Razzano	Men	
June 10, 2015	(United States) Stephen Carriere	Men	
June 12, 2015	(Canada) Jeremy Ten	Men	
June 17, 2015	(United States) Christina Gao	Ladies	
June 30, 2015	(United States) Simon Shnapir	Pairs	

=== Coaching changes ===
Date	Skater(s)	Disc.	From	To	Ref.
July 17, 2014	(United States) Alexandra Aldridge / Daniel Eaton	Ice dance	Anjelika Krylova	Marina Zueva & Massimo Scali	
July 29, 2014	(Italy) Anna Cappellini / Luca Lanotte	Ice dance	Igor Shpilband	Marina Zueva	
August 1, 2014	(Russia) Serafima Sakhanovich	Ladies	Alina Pisarenko	Eteri Tutberidze & Sergei Dudakov	
March 19, 2015	(United States) Haven Denney / Brandon Frazier	Pairs	Silvia Fontana & John Zimmerman	Ingo Steuer	
April 4, 2015	(Canada) Kirsten Moore-Towers / Michael Marinaro	Pairs	Kris Wirtz & Kristy Wirtz	Bruno Marcotte, Richard Gauthier & Sylvie Fullum	
April 8, 2015	(Russia) Serafima Sakhanovich	Ladies	Eteri Tutberidze & Sergei Dudakov	Alina Pisarenko	
April 8, 2015	(United States) Shotaro Omori	Men	Tammy Gambill	Yuka Sato & Jason Dungjen	
April 11, 2015	(United States) Madison Hubbell / Zachary Donohue	Ice dance	Anjelika Krylova, Pasquale Camerlengo & Natalia Annenko	Marie-France Dubreuil & Patrice Lauzon	
April 14, 2015	(Finland) Olesia Karmi / Max Lindholm	Ice dance	Maurizio Margaglio	Marina Zueva	
April 24, 2015	(Canada) Alexandra Paul / Mitchell Islam	Ice dance	Anjelika Krylova & Pasquale Camerlengo	Marie-France Dubreuil, Patrice Lauzon & Romain Haguenauer	
April 29, 2015	(Canada) Gabrielle Daleman	Ladies	Andrei Berezintsev, Inga Zusev & Michael Daleman	Lee Barkell, Brian Orser & Tracy Wilson	
May 8, 2015	(Belarus) Pavel Ignatenko	Men	Marina Selitskaia	Anna Tsareva	
May 10, 2015	(United Kingdom) Penny Coomes / Nicholas Buckland	Ice dance	Evgeni Platov & Philip Askew	Igor Shpilband	
May 30, 2015	(Russia) Egor Zakroev	Pairs	Valentina Tiukova, Valeri Tiukov & Pavel Sliusarenko	Natalia Pavlova	
May 30, 2015	(Russia) Maria Vigalova	Pairs	Valentina Tiukova, Valeri Tiukov & Pavel Sliusarenko	Nina Mozer	
June 1, 2015	(United States) Vincent Zhou	Men	Tammy Gambill	Tom Zakrajsek & Becky Calvin	
June 5, 2015	(Russia) Maria Stavitskaia	Ice dance	Tatiana Mishina & Alexei Mishin	Alexander Zhulin	
June 15, 2015	(United States) Hannah Miller	Ladies	Kirsten Miller-Zisholz	Rafael Arutyunyan	
June 26, 2015	(Canada) Nicole Orford	Ice dance	Megan Wing & Aaron Lowe	Carol Lane, Jon Lane & Juris Razgulajevs	

== Competitions ==
Code key

- S – Senior event
- J – Junior event
- N – Novice event
- M – Men's singles
- L – Ladies' singles
- P – Pair skating
- D – Ice dance

Color key

- ISU Championships
- Grand Prix or Junior Grand Prix
- Challenger Series
- National championships
- Other competition

2014
Dates	Event	Type	Level	Disc.	Location	Results
August 6–10	Asian Open Trophy	Other	All	M/L	Taipei, Taiwan	Details
August 14–16	Skate Down Under	Other	Senior	L	Dunedin, New Zealand	Details
August 14–16	Skate Down Under	Other	J/N	M/L	Dunedin, New Zealand	Details
August 20–24	JGP France	Grand Prix	Junior	M/L/D	Courchevel, France	Details
August 27–31	JGP Slovenia	Grand Prix	Junior	M/L/D	Ljubljana, Slovenia	Details
September 3–7	JGP Czech Republic	Grand Prix	Junior	All	Ostrava, Czech Republic	Details
September 10–14	U.S. International Classic	Challenger	Senior	All	Salt Lake City, Utah, United States	Details
September 10–14	JGP Japan	Grand Prix	Junior	M/L/D	Nagoya, Japan	Details
September 18–21	Lombardia Trophy	Challenger	Senior	M/L/P	Sesto San Giovanni, Italy	Details
September 24–28	JGP Estonia	Grand Prix	Junior	All	Tallinn, Estonia	Details
September 25–27	Nebelhorn Trophy	Challenger	Senior	All	Oberstdorf, Germany	Details
October 1–5	JGP Germany	Grand Prix	Junior	All	Dresden, Germany	Details
October 2–4	Master's de Patinage	Other	S/J	All	Orléans, France	
October 2–5	Ondrej Nepela Trophy	Challenger	Senior	All	Bratislava, Slovakia	Details
October 4	Japan Open	Other	Senior	M/L	Saitama, Japan	Details
October 8–12	JGP Croatia	Grand Prix	Junior	All	Zagreb, Croatia	Details
October 9–12	Finlandia Trophy	Challenger	Senior	M/L/D	Espoo, Finland	Details
October 9–12	New Zealand Championships	Nationals	All	All	Dunedin, New Zealand	Details
October 15–18	Skate Canada Autumn Classic	Challenger	Senior	All	Barrie, Ontario, Canada	Details
October 15–19	International Cup of Nice	Other	S/J	All	Nice, France	Details
October 16–19	Ice Star	Other	Senior	L/D	Minsk, Belarus	Details
October 16–19	Ice Star	Other	J/N	All	Minsk, Belarus	Details
October 23–26	Crystal Skate of Romania	Other	Senior	L	Brașov, Romania	Details
October 23–26	Crystal Skate of Romania	Other	J/N	M/L	Brașov, Romania	Details
October 23–26	Tirnavia Ice Cup	Other	J/N	M/L	Trnava, Slovakia	Details
October 24–26	Skate America	Grand Prix	Senior	All	Chicago, Illinois, United States	Details
October 31 – November 2	Skate Canada International	Grand Prix	Senior	All	Kelowna, British Columbia, Canada	Details
November 5–9	Volvo Open Cup	Challenger	Senior	All	Riga, Latvia	Details 1, 2
November 6–9	Golden Bear of Zagreb	Other	Senior	L	Zagreb, Croatia	Details
November 6–9	Golden Bear of Zagreb	Other	J/N	M/L	Zagreb, Croatia	Details
November 7–9	Cup of China	Grand Prix	Senior	All	Shanghai, China	Details
November 7–9	NRW Trophy	Other	All	D	Dortmund, Germany	Details
November 11–16	Ice Challenge	Challenger	Senior	All	Graz, Austria	Details 1, 2
November 12–16	Skate Celje	Other	J/N	M/L	Celje, Slovenia	Details
November 14–16	Rostelecom Cup	Grand Prix	Senior	All	Moscow, Russia	Details
November 14–16	Merano Cup	Other	All	M/L	Merano, Italy	Details
November 20–23	Open d'Andorra	Other	All	M/L/D	Canillo, Andorra	Details
November 21–23	Trophée Éric Bompard	Grand Prix	Senior	All	Bordeaux, France	Details
November 21–23	Grand Prize SNP	Other	J/N	M/L	Banská Bystrica, Slovakia	Details
November 21–24	Warsaw Cup	Challenger	S/J	All	Warsaw, Poland	Details
November 25–30	NRW Trophy	Other	All	M/L/P	Dortmund, Germany	Details
November 26–30	British Championships	Nationals	Senior	All	Sheffield, England, United Kingdom	Details
November 28–30	Pavel Roman Memorial	Other	All	D	Olomouc, Czech Republic	Details
November 28–30	NHK Trophy	Grand Prix	Senior	All	Osaka, Japan	Details
November 29 – December 5	Australian Championships	Nationals	All	All	Brisbane, Australia	Details
December 1–7	Santa Claus Cup	Other	All	M/L/D	Budapest, Hungary	Details
December 3–7	Tallinn Trophy	Other	All	M/L/D	Tallinn, Estonia	Details
December 3–7	Skate Canada Challenge	Other	All	All	Pierrefonds, Quebec, Canada	Details
December 4–7	Golden Spin of Zagreb	Challenger	Senior	All	Zagreb, Croatia	Details
December 5–7	Danish Championships	Nationals	All	All	Herning, Denmark	Details
December 11–14	Grand Prix Final	Grand Prix	S/J	All	Barcelona, Spain	Details
December 11–14	Swedish Championships	Nationals	All	All	Västerås, Sweden	Details
December 12–13	Swiss Championships	Nationals	Senior	All	Lugano, Switzerland	Details
December 12–14	Denkova-Staviski Cup	Other	All	M/L	Sofia, Bulgaria	Details
December 13–14	Grand Prix of Bratislava	Other	J/N	M/L	Bratislava, Slovakia	Details
December 13–14	German Championships	Nationals	Senior	All	Stuttgart, Germany	Details
December 13–14	Latvian Championships	Nationals	All	M/L	Tukums, Latvia	Details
December 18–20	Austrian Championships	Nationals	S/J	All	Dornbirn, Austria	Details 1, 2
December 18–21	French Championships	Nationals	Senior	All	Megève, France	Details
December 19–20	Ukrainian Championships	Nationals	Senior	All	Kyiv, Ukraine	Details
December 19–21	Four Nationals Championships	Nationals	Senior	All	Budapest, Hungary	Details
December 19–21	Finnish Championships	Nationals	S/J	M/L/D	Vantaa, Finland	Details
December 19–21	Spanish Championships	Nationals	All	All	Granada, Spain	Details
December 20–21	Belarusian Championships	Nationals	Senior	All	Minsk, Belarus	Details
December 20–21	Estonian Championships	Nationals	Senior	M/L/D	Tallinn, Estonia	Details
December 20–21	Italian Championships	Nationals	S/J	All	Turin, Italy	Details
December 25–28	Russian Championships	Nationals	Senior	All	Sochi, Russia	Details 1, 2
December 26–28	Japan Championships	Nationals	Senior	All	Nagano, Japan	Details
December 27–28	Chinese Championships	Nationals	Senior	All	Changchun, China	Details

2015
Dates	Event	Type	Level	Disc.	Location	Results
January 7–10	Mentor Toruń Cup	Other	All	All	Toruń, Poland	Details
January 7–9	South Korean Championships	Nationals	S/J	M/L/D	Seoul, South Korea	Details 1, 2, 3, 4
January 15–18	Reykjavik International Games	Other	All	L	Reykjavík, Iceland	Details
January 16	Medal Winners Open	Other	Senior	M/L	Tokyo, Japan	Details
January 18–25	U.S. Championships	Nationals	All	All	Greensboro, North Carolina, United States	Details
January 19–25	Canadian Championships	Nationals	All	All	Kingston, Ontario, Canada	Details
January 20–24	Skate Helena	Other	All	M/L	Belgrade, Serbia	Details
January 24–25	Dutch Championships	Nationals	All	M/L	Den Bosch, Netherlands	Details
January 26–28	European Youth Olympic Winter Festival	Other	Junior	M/L	Vorarlberg, Austria	Details
January 28 – February 1	European Championships	Championships	Senior	All	Stockholm, Sweden	Details
February 2–8	Jégvirág Cup	Other	Senior	M	Miskolc, Hungary	Details
February 2–8	Jégvirág Cup	Other	J/N	M/L	Miskolc, Hungary	Details
February 4–8	Winter Universiade	Other	Senior	All	Antequera, Spain	Details 1, 2
February 9–15	Four Continents Championships	Championships	Senior	All	Seoul, South Korea	Details
February 11–15	Bavarian Open	Other	All	All	Oberstdorf, Germany	Details
February 11–15	Nordic Championships	Other	All	M/L	Stavanger, Norway	Details
February 12–15	Dragon Trophy	Other	All	M/L	Ljubljana, Slovenia	Details
February 18–22	International Challenge Cup	Other	All	M/L/P	The Hague, Netherlands	Details
February 19–22	Sarajevo Open	Other	All	M/L	Sarajevo, Bosnia and Herzegovina	Details
February 24 – March 1	Hellmut Seibt Memorial	Other	All	M/L	Vienna, Austria	Details
March 2–8	World Junior Championships	Championships	Junior	All	Tallinn, Estonia	Details
March 3–8	Sportland Trophy	Other	J/N	M/L/P	Budapest, Hungary	Details
March 13–15	Coupe du Printemps	Other	All	M/L/P	Kockelscheuer, Luxembourg	Details
March 22–24	Gardena Spring Trophy	Other	All	M/L	Sëlva, Italy	Details
March 23–29	World Championships	Championships	Senior	All	Shanghai, China	Details
March 27–29	Avas Cup	Other	All	M/L	Miskolc, Hungary	Details
April 6–11	World Development Trophy	Other	J/N	M/L	Putrajaya, Malaysia	Details
April 10–12	Hamar Trophy	Other	All	M/L	Hamar, Norway	Details
April 16–19	Triglav Trophy	Other	All	M/L	Jesenice, Slovenia	Details
April 16–19	World Team Trophy	Other	Senior	All	Tokyo, Japan	Details
April 28–29	World Development Trophy	Other	J/N	M/L	Gdańsk, Poland	Details

== International medalists ==
=== Men's singles ===
Championships
Competition	Gold	Silver	Bronze	Results
(Sweden) European Championships	(Spain) Javier Fernández	(Russia) Maxim Kovtun	(Russia) Sergei Voronov	Details
(South Korea) Four Continents Championships	(Kazakhstan) Denis Ten	(United States) Joshua Farris	(China) Yan Han	Details
(Estonia) World Junior Championships	(Japan) Shoma Uno	(China) Jin Boyang	(Japan) Sota Yamamoto	Details
(China) World Championships	(Spain) Javier Fernández	(Japan) Yuzuru Hanyu	(Kazakhstan) Denis Ten	Details

Grand Prix
Competition	Gold	Silver	Bronze	Results
(United States) Skate America	(Japan) Tatsuki Machida	(United States) Jason Brown	(Canada) Nam Nguyen	Details
Skate Canada International	(Japan) Takahito Mura	(Spain) Javier Fernández	(United States) Max Aaron	Details
Cup of China	(Russia) Maxim Kovtun	(Japan) Yuzuru Hanyu	(United States) Richard Dornbush	Details
(Russia) Rostelecom Cup	(Spain) Javier Fernández	(Russia) Sergei Voronov	(Czech Republic) Michal Březina	Details
(France) Trophée Éric Bompard	(Russia) Maxim Kovtun	(Japan) Tatsuki Machida	(Kazakhstan) Denis Ten	Details
(Japan) NHK Trophy	(Japan) Daisuke Murakami	(Russia) Sergei Voronov	(Japan) Takahito Mura	Details
(Spain) Grand Prix Final	(Japan) Yuzuru Hanyu	(Spain) Javier Fernández	(Russia) Sergei Voronov	Details

Junior Grand Prix
Competition	Gold	Silver	Bronze	Results
JGP France	(South Korea) Lee June-hyoung	(Japan) Sota Yamamoto	(Russia) Alexander Samarin	Details
JGP Slovenia	(China) Jin Boyang	(Russia) Alexander Petrov	(Russia) Dmitri Aliev	Details
JGP Czech Republic	(Canada) Roman Sadovsky	(Russia) Alexander Samarin	(Japan) Sei Kawahara	Details
JGP Japan	(China) Jin Boyang	(Japan) Shoma Uno	(Russia) Dmitri Aliev	Details
JGP Estonia	(Russia) Alexander Petrov	(Japan) Sota Yamamoto	(China) Zhang He	Details
JGP Germany	(Russia) Andrei Lazukin	(China) Zhang He	(Ukraine) Yaroslav Paniot	Details
JGP Croatia	(Japan) Shoma Uno	(United States) Nathan Chen	(South Korea) Lee June-hyoung	Details
(Spain) JGP Final	(Japan) Shoma Uno	(Japan) Sota Yamamoto	(Russia) Alexander Petrov	Details

Challenger Series
Competition	Gold	Silver	Bronze	Results
(United States) U.S. International Classic	(United States) Max Aaron	(United States) Ross Miner	(Japan) Daisuke Murakami	Details
(Italy) Lombardia Trophy	(United States) Richard Dornbush	(Japan) Takahito Mura	(Russia) Adian Pitkeev	Details
(Germany) Nebelhorn Trophy	(United States) Jason Brown	(Czech Republic) Michal Březina	(Russia) Konstantin Menshov	Details
(Slovakia) Ondrej Nepela Trophy	(United States) Stephen Carriere	(South Korea) Kim Jin-seo	(Russia) Gordei Gorshkov	Details
(Finland) Finlandia Trophy	(Russia) Sergei Voronov	(United States) Adam Rippon	(Russia) Alexander Petrov	Details
Skate Canada Autumn Classic	(United States) Ross Miner	(Canada) Nam Nguyen	(Canada) Jeremy Ten	
(Latvia) Volvo Open Cup	(Russia) Alexander Petrov	(Russia) Gordei Gorshkov	(Russia) Artur Dmitriev Jr.	Details
(Austria) Ice Challenge	(United States) Douglas Razzano	(Russia) Alexander Samarin	(Germany) Martin Rappe	Details
(Poland) Warsaw Cup	(Russia) Alexander Petrov	(Philippines) Michael Christian Martinez	(Italy) Matteo Rizzo	Details
(Croatia) Golden Spin of Zagreb	(Kazakhstan) Denis Ten	(Czech Republic) Michal Březina	(Russia) Konstantin Menshov	Details

Other international competitions
Competition	Gold	Silver	Bronze	Results
(France) International Cup of Nice	(Russia) Alexander Petrov	(Russia) Artur Dmitriev Jr.	(Japan) Keiji Tanaka	Details
(Italy) Merano Cup	(Japan) Ryuju Hino	(Italy) Matteo Rizzo	(Germany) Christopher Berneck	
Open d'Andorra	(Spain) Javier Raya	(Spain) Felipe Montoya	(Sweden) Trevor Bergqvist	
(Germany) NRW Trophy	(Germany) Franz Streubel	(Ukraine) Ivan Pavlov	(Germany) Martin Rappe	Details
(Hungary) Santa Claus Cup	(Spain) Javier Raya	(Spain) Felipe Montoya	(Austria) Manuel Koll	
(Estonia) Tallinn Trophy	(Israel) Oleksii Bychenko	(Israel) Daniel Samohin	(Armenia) Slavik Hayrapetyan	
(Bulgaria) Denkova-Staviski Cup	(Italy) Matteo Rizzo	(Denmark) Justus Strid	(Italy) Adrien Bannister	
(Poland) Mentor Toruń Cup	(France) Romain Ponsart	(France) Chafik Besseghier	(Germany) Peter Liebers	Details
(Serbia) Skate Helena	(Philippines) Michael Christian Martinez	No other competitors		
(Hungary) Jégvirág Cup	(United Kingdom) Jack Newberry	(United Kingdom) Graham Newberry	No other competitors	
(Spain) Winter Universiade	(Germany) Peter Liebers	(Japan) Takahiko Kozuka	(Russia) Artur Gachinski	Details
(Germany) Bavarian Open	(Russia) Andrei Lazukin	(Germany) Franz Streubel	(Finland) Valtter Virtanen	Details
(Norway) Nordic Championships	(Spain) Javier Raya	(Norway) Sondre Oddvoll Bøe	(Sweden) Ondrej Spiegl	
(Slovenia) Dragon Trophy	(Italy) Mattia Dalla Torre	No other competitors		
(Netherlands) International Challenge Cup	(Italy) Ivan Righini	(Spain) Javier Raya	(Japan) Ryuju Hino	Details
(Austria) Hellmut Seibt Memorial	(Czech Republic) Michal Březina	(Sweden) Alexander Majorov	(Czech Republic) Petr Coufal	Details
(Luxembourg) Coupe du Printemps	(Japan) Daisuke Murakami	(France) Kévin Aymoz	(Germany) Alexander Bjelde	
(Italy) Gardena Spring Trophy	(Russia) Mikhail Kolyada	(Japan) Keiji Tanaka	(Japan) Hiroaki Sato	Details
(Hungary) Avas Cup	(United Kingdom) Jack Newberry	(Mexico) Adrian Alvarado	No other competitors	Details
(Norway) Hamar Trophy	(Switzerland) Stéphane Walker	(United Kingdom) Lewis Gibson	No other competitors	Details
(Slovenia) Triglav Trophy	(Philippines) Michael Christian Martinez	(South Korea) Lee June-hyoung	(Italy) Maurizio Zandron	Details

=== Ladies' singles ===
Championships
Competition	Gold	Silver	Bronze	Results
(Sweden) European Championships	(Russia) Elizaveta Tuktamysheva	(Russia) Elena Radionova	(Russia) Anna Pogorilaya	Details
(South Korea) Four Continents Championships	(United States) Polina Edmunds	(Japan) Satoko Miyahara	(Japan) Rika Hongo	Details
(Estonia) World Junior Championships	(Russia) Evgenia Medvedeva	(Russia) Serafima Sakhanovich	(Japan) Wakaba Higuchi	Details
(China) World Championships	(Russia) Elizaveta Tuktamysheva	(Japan) Satoko Miyahara	(Russia) Elena Radionova	Details

Grand Prix
Competition	Gold	Silver	Bronze	Results
(United States) Skate America	(Russia) Elena Radionova	(Russia) Elizaveta Tuktamysheva	(United States) Gracie Gold	Details
Skate Canada International	(Russia) Anna Pogorilaya	(United States) Ashley Wagner	(Japan) Satoko Miyahara	Details
Cup of China	(Russia) Elizaveta Tuktamysheva	(Russia) Yulia Lipnitskaya	(Japan) Kanako Murakami	Details
(Russia) Rostelecom Cup	(Japan) Rika Hongo	(Russia) Anna Pogorilaya	(Canada) Alaine Chartrand	Details
(France) Trophée Éric Bompard	(Russia) Elena Radionova	(Russia) Yulia Lipnitskaya	(United States) Ashley Wagner	Details
(Japan) NHK Trophy	(United States) Gracie Gold	(Russia) Alena Leonova	(Japan) Satoko Miyahara	Details
(Spain) Grand Prix Final	(Russia) Elizaveta Tuktamysheva	(Russia) Elena Radionova	(United States) Ashley Wagner	Details

Junior Grand Prix
Competition	Gold	Silver	Bronze	Results
JGP France	(Russia) Evgenia Medvedeva	(Japan) Rin Nitaya	(United States) Amber Glenn	Details
JGP Slovenia	(Russia) Serafima Sakhanovich	(Japan) Yuka Nagai	(United States) Leah Keiser	Details
JGP Czech Republic	(Russia) Evgenia Medvedeva	(Japan) Wakaba Higuchi	(United States) Karen Chen	Details
JGP Japan	(Russia) Serafima Sakhanovich	(Japan) Yuka Nagai	(Kazakhstan) Elizabet Tursynbayeva	Details
JGP Estonia	(Japan) Miyu Nakashio	(Russia) Maria Sotskova	(Russia) Alsu Kaiumova	Details
JGP Germany	(Japan) Wakaba Higuchi	(Kazakhstan) Elizabet Tursynbayeva	(Russia) Alexandra Proklova	Details
JGP Croatia	(Russia) Maria Sotskova	(United States) Karen Chen	(Russia) Alexandra Proklova	Details
(Spain) JGP Final	(Russia) Evgenia Medvedeva	(Russia) Serafima Sakhanovich	(Japan) Wakaba Higuchi	Details

Challenger Series
Competition	Gold	Silver	Bronze	Results
(United States) U.S. International Classic	(United States) Polina Edmunds	(United States) Courtney Hicks	(Japan) Riona Kato	Details
(Italy) Lombardia Trophy	(Japan) Satoko Miyahara	(United States) Hannah Miller	(United States) Angela Wang	Details
(Germany) Nebelhorn Trophy	(Russia) Elizaveta Tuktamysheva	(Russia) Alena Leonova	(United States) Gracie Gold	Details
(Slovakia) Ondrej Nepela Trophy	(Italy) Roberta Rodeghiero	(Sweden) Joshi Helgesson	(United States) Ashley Cain	Details
(Finland) Finlandia Trophy	(Russia) Elizaveta Tuktamysheva	(United States) Samantha Cesario	(Japan) Rika Hongo	Details
Skate Canada Autumn Classic	(Canada) Gabrielle Daleman	(United States) Angela Wang	(Canada) Julianne Séguin	
(Latvia) Volvo Open Cup	(Latvia) Angelīna Kučvaļska	(Germany) Lutricia Bock	(Finland) Jenni Saarinen	Details
(Austria) Ice Challenge	(United States) Hannah Miller	(Sweden) Isabelle Olsson	(Hungary) Ivett Tóth	Details
(Poland) Warsaw Cup	(Russia) Elizaveta Tuktamysheva	(Armenia) Anastasia Galustyan	(Lithuania) Aleksandra Golovkina	Details
(Croatia) Golden Spin of Zagreb	(Finland) Kiira Korpi	(Russia) Maria Artemieva	(Slovakia) Nicole Rajičová	Details

Other international competitions
Competition	Gold	Silver	Bronze	Results
(New Zealand) Skate Down Under	(Australia) Jaimee Nobbs	(Hong Kong) Chelsea Chiyan Yim	(Hong Kong) Tiffany Yong Yeu Lau	
(France) International Cup of Nice	(Russia) Elizaveta Tuktamysheva	(Japan) Miyabi Oba	(Sweden) Isabelle Olsson	Details
(Belarus) Ice Star	(Belarus) Janina Makeenka	(Lithuania) Aleksandra Golovkina	(Estonia) Helery Hälvin	
Crystal Skate of Romania	(Romania) Julia Sauter	(Italy) Carol Bressanutti	(South Korea) Kwak Min-jeong	
(Croatia) Golden Bear of Zagreb	(Italy) Carol Bressanutti	(Slovenia) Daša Grm	(Austria) Sophie Almassy	
(Italy) Merano Cup	(Italy) Roberta Rodeghiero	(Italy) Giada Russo	(Switzerland) Eveline Brunner	
Open d'Andorra	(Italy) Sara Falotico	(Sweden) Elin Hallberg	(Spain) Sonia Lafuente	
(Germany) NRW Trophy	(Germany) Nicole Schott	(Austria) Kerstin Frank	(Luxembourg) Fleur Maxwell	Details
(Hungary) Santa Claus Cup	(Hungary) Ivett Tóth	(Italy) Giada Russo	(Romania) Julia Sauter	
(Estonia) Tallinn Trophy	(Latvia) Angelina Kučvaļska	(Armenia) Anastasia Galustyan	(Finland) Liubov Efimenko	
(Bulgaria) Denkova-Staviski Cup	(Denmark) Pernille Sorensen	(Luxembourg) Fleur Maxwell	(Italy) Micol Cristini	
(Poland) Mentor Toruń Cup	(Latvia) Angelīna Kučvaļska	(Australia) Kailani Craine	(Slovenia) Daša Grm	Details
(Iceland) Reykjavik International Games	(Iceland) Nadía Margrét Jamchi	No other competitors		
(Serbia) Skate Helena	(Finland) Juulia Turkkila	(Finland) Emilia Toikkanen	(Finland) Helena Stenbacka	
(Spain) Winter Universiade	(Russia) Alena Leonova	(France) Maé-Bérénice Méité	(Russia) Maria Artemieva	Details
(Germany) Bavarian Open	(Japan) Mariko Kihara	(Germany) Lutricia Bock	(Netherlands) Niki Wories	Details
(Norway) Nordic Championships	(Finland) Jenni Saarinen	(Norway) Anne Line Gjersem	(Finland) Viveca Lindfors	
(Slovenia) Dragon Trophy	(Czech Republic) Eliška Březinová	(Hungary) Ivett Tóth	(Italy) Ilaria Nogaro	
(Netherlands) International Challenge Cup	(Japan) Kanako Murakami	(Sweden) Joshi Helgesson	(Netherlands) Niki Wories	Details
(Austria) Hellmut Seibt Memorial	(Slovenia) Daša Grm	(Italy) Roberta Rodeghiero	(France) Laurine Lecavelier	Details
(Luxembourg) Coupe du Printemps	(Sweden) Joshi Helgesson	(Japan) Riona Kato	(Germany) Nicole Schott	
(Italy) Gardena Spring Trophy	(Japan) Rin Nitaya	(Italy) Guia Maria Tagliapietra	(Italy) Ilaria Nogaro	Details
(Hungary) Avas Trophy	(Hungary) Júlia Bátori	(Hungary) Eszter Szombathelyi	(United Kingdom) Frances Howell	Details
(Norway) Hamar Trophy	(Slovakia) Ivana Reitmayerová	No other competitors		Details
(Slovenia) Triglav Trophy	(Japan) Miyu Nakashio	(Japan) Yura Matsuda	(Italy) Ilaria Nogaro	Details

=== Pairs ===
Championships
Competition	Gold	Silver	Bronze	Results
(Sweden) European Championships	(Russia) Yuko Kavaguti / Alexander Smirnov	(Russia) Ksenia Stolbova / Fedor Klimov	(Russia) Evgenia Tarasova / Vladimir Morozov	Details
(South Korea) Four Continents Championships	(Canada) Meagan Duhamel / Eric Radford	(China) Peng Cheng / Zhang Hao	(China) Pang Qing / Tong Jian	Details
(Estonia) World Junior Championships	(China) Yu Xiaoyu / Jin Yang	(Canada) Julianne Séguin / Charlie Bilodeau	(Russia) Lina Fedorova / Maxim Miroshkin	Details
(China) World Championships	(Canada) Meagan Duhamel / Eric Radford	(China) Sui Wenjing / Han Cong	(China) Pang Qing / Tong Jian	Details

Grand Prix
Competition	Gold	Silver	Bronze	Results
(United States) Skate America	(Russia) Yuko Kavaguti / Alexander Smirnov	(United States) Haven Denney / Brandon Frazier	(China) Peng Cheng / Zhang Hao	Details
Skate Canada International	(Canada) Meagan Duhamel / Eric Radford	(China) Sui Wenjing / Han Cong	(Russia) Evgenia Tarasova / Vladimir Morozov	Details
Cup of China	(China) Peng Cheng / Zhang Hao	(China) Yu Xiaoyu / Jin Yang	(China) Wang Xuehan / Wang Lei	Details
(Russia) Rostelecom Cup	(Russia) Ksenia Stolbova / Fedor Klimov	(Russia) Evgenia Tarasova / Vladimir Morozov	(Russia) Kristina Astakhova / Alexei Rogonov	Details
(France) Trophée Éric Bompard	(Russia) Ksenia Stolbova / Fedor Klimov	(China) Sui Wenjing / Han Cong	(China) Wang Xuehan / Wang Lei	Details
(Japan) NHK Trophy	(Canada) Meagan Duhamel / Eric Radford	(Russia) Yuko Kavaguti / Alexander Smirnov	(China) Yu Xiaoyu / Jin Yang	Details
(Spain) Grand Prix Final	(Canada) Meagan Duhamel / Eric Radford	(Russia) Ksenia Stolbova / Fedor Klimov	(China) Sui Wenjing / Han Cong	Details

Junior Grand Prix
Competition	Gold	Silver	Bronze	Results
JGP Czech Republic	(Canada) Julianne Séguin / Charlie Bilodeau	(Russia) Lina Fedorova / Maxim Miroshkin	(Russia) Kamilla Gainetdinova / Sergei Alexeev	Details
JGP Estonia	(Russia) Maria Vigalova / Egor Zakroev	(Russia) Kamilla Gainetdinova / Sergei Alexeev	(Russia) Anastasia A. Gubanova / Alexei Sintsov	Details
JGP Germany	(Canada) Julianne Séguin / Charlie Bilodeau	(Russia) Lina Fedorova / Maxim Miroshkin	(United States) Chelsea Liu / Brian Johnson	Details
JGP Croatia	(Russia) Maria Vigalova / Egor Zakroev	(Russia) Daria Beklemisheva / Maxim Bobrov	(Ukraine) Renata Oganesian / Mark Bardei	Details
(Spain) JGP Final	(Canada) Julianne Séguin / Charlie Bilodeau	(Russia) Lina Fedorova / Maxim Miroshkin	(Russia) Maria Vigalova / Egor Zakroev	Details

Challenger Series
Competition	Gold	Silver	Bronze	Results
(United States) U.S. International Classic	(United States) Alexa Scimeca / Chris Knierim	(United States) Jessica Calalang / Zack Sidhu	(United States) Madeline Aaron / Max Settlage	Details
(Italy) Lombardia Trophy	(United States) Haven Denney / Brandon Frazier	(Italy) Bianca Manacorda / Niccolo Macii	(Russia) Vera Bazarova / Andrei Deputat	Details
(Germany) Nebelhorn Trophy	(Russia) Yuko Kavaguti / Alexander Smirnov	(Russia) Evgenia Tarasova / Vladimir Morozov	(United States) Alexa Scimeca / Chris Knierim	Details
Skate Canada Autumn Classic	(Canada) Meagan Duhamel / Eric Radford	(United States) Haven Denney / Brandon Frazier	(United States) Jessica Calalang / Zack Sidhu	
(Latvia) Volvo Open Cup	(Russia) Kristina Astakhova / Alexei Rogonov	(Russia) Maria Vigalova / Egor Zakroev	(Belarus) Maria Paliakova / Nikita Bochkov	Details
(Austria) Ice Challenge	(Russia) Lina Fedorova / Maxim Miroshkin	(Austria) Miriam Ziegler / Severin Kiefer	(Germany) Mari Vartmann / Aaron Van Cleave	Details
(Poland) Warsaw Cup	(Canada) Lubov Iliushechkina / Dylan Moscovitch	(Russia) Lina Fedorova / Maxim Miroshkin	(Italy) Valentina Marchei / Ondřej Hotárek	Details
(Croatia) Golden Spin of Zagreb	(Russia) Kristina Astakhova / Alexei Rogonov	(Italy) Valentina Marchei / Ondřej Hotárek	(United States) Tarah Kayne / Daniel O'Shea	Details

Other international competitions
Competition	Gold	Silver	Bronze	Results
(France) International Cup of Nice	(Italy) Nicole Della Monica / Matteo Guarise	(Russia) Vera Bazarova / Andrei Deputat	(Germany) Mari Vartmann / Aaron Van Cleave	Details
(Germany) NRW Trophy	(Hong Kong) Marin Ono / Hon Lam To	(Switzerland) Alexandra Herbríková / Nicolas Roulet	(Germany) Minerva Fabienne Hase / Nolan Seegert	Details
(Poland) Mentor Toruń Cup	(Italy) Nicole Della Monica / Matteo Guarise	(Belarus) Tatiana Danilova / Mikalai Kamianchuk	(Germany) Minerva-Fabienne Hase / Nolan Seegert	Details
(Spain) Winter Universiade	(China) Yu Xiaoyu / Jin Yang	(Russia) Kristina Astakhova / Alexei Rogonov	(France) Vanessa James / Morgan Ciprès	Details
(Germany) Bavarian Open	(United Kingdom) Amani Fancy / Christopher Boyadji	(Italy) Alessandra Cernuschi / Filippo Ambrosini	(Bulgaria) Elizaveta Makarova / Leri Kenchadze	Details
(Netherlands) International Challenge Cup	(United States) Gretchen Donlan / Nathan Bartholomay	(United Kingdom) Caitlin Yankowskas / Hamish Gaman	(Germany) Minerva-Fabienne Hase / Nolan Seegert	Details

=== Ice dance ===
Championships
Competition	Gold	Silver	Bronze	Results
(Sweden) European Championships	(France) Gabriella Papadakis / Guillaume Cizeron	(Italy) Anna Cappellini / Luca Lanotte	(Russia) Alexandra Stepanova / Ivan Bukin	Details
(South Korea) Four Continents Championships	(Canada) Kaitlyn Weaver / Andrew Poje	(United States) Madison Chock / Evan Bates	(United States) Maia Shibutani / Alex Shibutani	Details
(Estonia) World Junior Championships	(Russia) Anna Yanovskaya / Sergey Mozgov	(United States) Lorraine McNamara / Quinn Carpenter	(Ukraine) Oleksandra Nazarova / Maxim Nikitin	Details
(China) World Championships	(France) Gabriella Papadakis / Guillaume Cizeron	(United States) Madison Chock / Evan Bates	(Canada) Kaitlyn Weaver / Andrew Poje	Details

Grand Prix
Competition	Gold	Silver	Bronze	Results
(United States) Skate America	(United States) Madison Chock / Evan Bates	(United States) Maia Shibutani / Alex Shibutani	(Russia) Alexandra Stepanova / Ivan Bukin	Details
Skate Canada International	(Canada) Kaitlyn Weaver / Andrew Poje	(Canada) Piper Gilles / Paul Poirier	(United States) Madison Hubbell / Zachary Donohue	Details
Cup of China	(France) Gabriella Papadakis / Guillaume Cizeron	(United States) Maia Shibutani / Alex Shibutani	(Italy) Anna Cappellini / Luca Lanotte	Details
(Russia) Rostelecom Cup	(United States) Madison Chock / Evan Bates	(Russia) Elena Ilinykh / Ruslan Zhiganshin	(United Kingdom) Penny Coomes / Nicholas Buckland	Details
(France) Trophée Éric Bompard	(France) Gabriella Papadakis / Guillaume Cizeron	(Canada) Piper Gilles / Paul Poirier	(United States) Madison Hubbell / Zachary Donohue	Details
(Japan) NHK Trophy	(Canada) Kaitlyn Weaver / Andrew Poje	(Russia) Ksenia Monko / Kirill Khaliavin	(United States) Kaitlin Hawayek / Jean-Luc Baker	Details
(Spain) Grand Prix Final	(Canada) Kaitlyn Weaver / Andrew Poje	(United States) Madison Chock / Evan Bates	(France) Gabriella Papadakis / Guillaume Cizeron	Details

Junior Grand Prix
Competition	Gold	Silver	Bronze	Results
JGP France	(Russia) Alla Loboda / Pavel Drozd	(Canada) Madeline Edwards / Zhao Kai Pang	(Russia) Anastasia Shpilevaya / Grigory Smirnov	Details
JGP Slovenia	(Russia) Daria Morozova / Mikhail Zhirnov	(Canada) Brianna Delmaestro / Timothy Lum	(United States) Holly Moore / Daniel Klaber	Details
JGP Czech Republic	(Canada) Mackenzie Bent / Garrett MacKeen	(Russia) Betina Popova / Yuri Vlasenko	(United States) Lorraine McNamara / Quinn Carpenter	Details
JGP Japan	(Canada) Madeline Edwards / Zhao Kai Pang	(Russia) Alla Loboda / Pavel Drozd	(United States) Rachel Parsons / Michael Parsons	Details
JGP Estonia	(Russia) Anna Yanovskaya / Sergey Mozgov	(Canada) Mackenzie Bent / Garrett MacKeen	(Ukraine) Oleksandra Nazarova / Maxim Nikitin	Details
JGP Germany	(Russia) Betina Popova / Yuri Vlasenko	(United States) Lorraine McNamara / Quinn Carpenter	(Canada) Brianna Delmaestro / Timothy Lum	Details
JGP Croatia	(Russia) Anna Yanovskaya / Sergey Mozgov	(United States) Rachel Parsons / Michael Parsons	(Hungary) Carolina Moscheni / Ádám Lukács	Details
(Spain) JGP Final	(Russia) Anna Yanovskaya / Sergey Mozgov	(Russia) Alla Loboda / Pavel Drozd	(Russia) Betina Popova / Yuri Vlasenko	Details

Challenger Series
Competition	Gold	Silver	Bronze	Results
(United States) U.S. International Classic	(United States) Alexandra Aldridge / Daniel Eaton	(Canada) Nicole Orford / Thomas Williams	(United States) Anastasia Cannuscio / Colin McManus	Details
(Germany) Nebelhorn Trophy	(Canada) Kaitlyn Weaver / Andrew Poje	(United States) Madison Chock / Evan Bates	(Germany) Nelli Zhiganshina / Alexander Gazsi	Details
(Slovakia) Ondrej Nepela Trophy	(United States) Maia Shibutani / Alex Shibutani	(Italy) Charlène Guignard / Marco Fabbri	(Slovakia) Federica Testa / Lukáš Csölley	Details
(Finland) Finlandia Trophy	(Russia) Alexandra Stepanova / Ivan Bukin	(Germany) Nelli Zhiganshina / Alexander Gazsi	(United States) Anastasia Cannuscio / Colin McManus	Details
Skate Canada Autumn Classic	(France) Gabriella Papadakis / Guillaume Cizeron	(Canada) Piper Gilles / Paul Poirier	(Denmark) Laurence Fournier Beaudry / Nikolaj Sørensen	
(Latvia) Volvo Open Cup	(Slovakia) Federica Testa / Lukáš Csölley	(Belarus) Viktoria Kavaliova / Yurii Bieliaiev	(South Korea) Rebeka Kim / Kirill Minov	Details
(Austria) Ice Challenge	(United States) Maia Shibutani / Alex Shibutani	(Denmark) Laurence Fournier Beaudry / Nikolaj Sørensen	(Austria) Barbora Silná / Juri Kurakin	Details
(Poland) Warsaw Cup	(Slovakia) Federica Testa / Lukáš Csölley	(Ukraine) Oleksandra Nazarova / Maxim Nikitin	(China) Wang Shiyue / Liu Xinyu	Details
(Croatia) Golden Spin of Zagreb	(United States) Madison Hubbell / Zachary Donohue	(Italy) Charlene Guignard / Marco Fabbri	(Spain) Sara Hurtado / Adrián Díaz	Details

Other international competitions
Competition	Gold	Silver	Bronze	Results
(France) International Cup of Nice	(United Kingdom) Penny Coomes / Nicholas Buckland	(United Kingdom) Olivia Smart / Joseph Buckland	(Ukraine) Lolita Yermak / Alexei Shumski	Details
(Belarus) Ice Star	(Russia) Ksenia Monko / Kirill Khaliavin	(Russia) Evgenia Kosigina / Nikolai Moroshkin	(Belarus) Viktoria Kavaliova / Yurii Bieliaiev	
Open d'Andorra	(Spain) Celia Robledo / Luis Fenero	(France) Marie-Jade Lauriault / Romain Le Gac	No other competitors	
(Germany) NRW Trophy	(United Kingdom) Penny Coomes / Nicholas Buckland	(United Kingdom) Olivia Smart / Joseph Buckland	(Finland) Olesia Karmi / Max Lindholm	Details
(Czech Republic) Pavel Roman Memorial	(Austria) Barbora Silná / Juri Kurakin	(Czech Republic) Cortney Mansour / Michal Češka	(France) Laureline Aubry / Kevin Bellingard	
(Hungary) Santa Claus Cup	(Poland) Natalia Kaliszek / Maksym Spodyriev	(Turkey) Alisa Agafonova / Alper Ucar	(Italy) Misato Komatsubara / Andrea Fabbri	
(Estonia) Tallinn Trophy	(Israel) Allison Reed / Vasili Rogov	(Georgia (country)) Tatiana Kozmava / Aleksandr Zolotarev	(Latvia) Olga Jakušina / Andrey Nevskiy	
(Poland) Mentor Toruń Cup	(China) Wang Shiyue / Liu Xinyu	(Turkey) Alisa Agafonova / Alper Uçar	(Poland) Natalia Kaliszek / Maksym Spodyriev	Details
(Spain) Winter Universiade	(Italy) Charlène Guignard / Marco Fabbri	(Spain) Sara Hurtado / Adrián Díaz	(Slovakia) Federica Testa / Lukáš Csölley	Details
(Germany) Bavarian Open	(Italy) Misato Komatsubara / Andrea Fabbri	(Israel) Allison Reed / Vasili Rogov	(Czech Republic) Cortney Mansour / Michal Češka	Details

== Season's best scores ==
=== Men's singles ===
Top 10 season's best scores in the men's combined total
No.	Skater	Nation	Score	Event
1	Denis Ten	Kazakhstan	289.46	2015 Four Continents Championships
2	Yuzuru Hanyu	Japan	288.58	2015 World Team Trophy
3	Javier Fernández	Spain	273.90	2015 World Championships
4	Tatsuki Machida	Japan	269.09	2014 Skate America
5	Jason Brown	United States	263.17	2015 World Team Trophy
6	Joshua Farris	United States	260.01	2015 Four Continents Championships
7	Yan Han	China	259.47	2015 Four Continents Championships
8	Daisuke Murakami	Japan	256.47	2015 Four Continents Championships
9	Shoma Uno	Japan	256.45	2015 Four Continents Championships
10	Takahito Mura	Japan	255.81	2014 Skate Canada International

Top 10 season's best scores in the men's short program
No.	Skater	Nation	Score	Event
1	Denis Ten	Kazakhstan	97.61	2015 Four Continents Championships
2	Yuzuru Hanyu	Japan	96.27	2015 World Team Trophy
3	Javier Fernández	Spain	93.92	2014 Rostelecom Cup
4	Tatsuki Machida	Japan	93.39	2014 Skate America
5	Sergei Voronov	Russia	90.33	2014 Rostelecom Cup
6	Shoma Uno	Japan	88.90	2015 Four Continents Championships
7	Konstantin Menshov	Russia	87.47	2014 Trophée Éric Bompard
8	Yan Han	China	87.34	2015 Four Continents Championships
9	Maxim Kovtun	Russia	87.02	2014–15 Grand Prix Final
10	Jason Brown	United States	86.48	2015 World Team Trophy

Top 10 season's best scores in the men's free skating
No.	Skater	Nation	Score	Event
1	Yuzuru Hanyu	Japan	194.08	2014–15 Grand Prix Final
2	Denis Ten	Kazakhstan	191.85	2015 Four Continents Championships
3	Javier Fernández	Spain	181.16	2015 World Championships
4	Jason Brown	United States	176.69	2015 World Team Trophy
5	Joshua Farris	United States	175.72	2015 Four Continents Championships
6	Tatsuki Machida	Japan	175.70	2014 Skate America
7	Daisuke Murakami	Japan	173.61	2015 Four Continents Championships
8	Takahito Mura	Japan	173.24	2014 Skate Canada International
9	Yan Han	China	172.13	2015 Four Continents Championships
10	Shoma Uno	Japan	167.55	2015 Four Continents Championships

=== Ladies' singles ===
Top 10 season's best scores in the ladies' combined total
No.	Skater	Nation	Score	Event
1	Elizaveta Tuktamysheva	Russia	210.40	2015 European Championships
2	Elena Radionova	Russia	209.54	2015 European Championships
3	Gracie Gold	United States	195.55	2015 World Team Trophy
4	Satoko Miyahara	Japan	193.60	2015 World Championships
5	Evgenia Medvedeva	Russia	192.97	2015 World Junior Championships
6	Serafima Sakhanovich	Russia	191.96	2014 JGP Slovenia
7	Anna Pogorilaya	Russia	191.81	2014 Skate Canada International
8	Ashley Wagner	United States	191.51	2015 World Team Trophy
9	Alena Leonova	Russia	186.71	2014 Nebelhorn Trophy
10	Wakaba Higuchi	Japan	185.57	2015 World Junior Championships

Top 10 season's best scores in the ladies' short program
No.	Skater	Nation	Score	Event
1	Elizaveta Tuktamysheva	Russia	77.62	2015 World Championships
2	Gracie Gold	United States	71.26	2015 World Team Trophy
3	Elena Radionova	Russia	70.46	2015 European Championships
4	Yulia Lipnitskaya	Russia	69.56	2014 Cup of China
5	Evgenia Medvedeva	Russia	68.48	2015 World Junior Championships
6	Alena Leonova	Russia	68.11	2014 NHK Trophy
7	Satoko Miyahara	Japan	67.02	2015 World Championships
8	Serafima Sakhanovich	Russia	66.58	2014 JGP Slovenia
9	Anna Pogorilaya	Russia	66.10	2015 European Championships
10	Kanako Murakami	Japan	65.48	2015 World Championships

Top 10 season's best scores in the ladies' free skating
No.	Skater	Nation	Score	Event
1	Elizaveta Tuktamysheva	Russia	141.38	2015 European Championships
2	Elena Radionova	Russia	139.08	2015 European Championships
3	Ashley Wagner	United States	129.26	2014–15 Grand Prix Final
4	Satoko Miyahara	Japan	129.12	2015 World Team Trophy
5	Gracie Gold	United States	128.23	2015 World Championships
6	Anna Pogorilaya	Russia	126.53	2014 Skate Canada International
7	Serafima Sakhanovich	Russia	125.38	2014 JGP Slovenia
8	Evgenia Medvedeva	Russia	124.49	2015 World Junior Championships
9	Wakaba Higuchi	Japan	124.30	2015 World Junior Championships
10	Polina Edmunds	United States	122.99	2015 Four Continents Championships

=== Pairs ===
Top 10 season's best scores in the pairs' combined total
No.	Team	Nation	Score	Event
1	Meagan Duhamel / Eric Radford	Canada	221.53	2015 World Championships
2	Sui Wenjing / Han Cong	China	214.12	2015 World Championships
3	Ksenia Stolbova / Fedor Klimov	Russia	213.72	2014–15 Grand Prix Final
4	Pang Qing / Tong Jian	China	212.77	2015 World Championships
5	Yuko Kavaguti / Alexander Smirnov	Russia	209.16	2014 Skate America
6	Peng Cheng / Zhang Hao	China	206.63	2015 World Championships
7	Evgenia Tarasova / Vladimir Morozov	Russia	198.46	2015 World Championships
8	Alexa Scimeca / Chris Knierim	United States	192.09	2015 World Team Trophy
9	Yu Xiaoyu / Jin Yang	China	187.79	2014–15 Grand Prix Final
10	Kristina Astakhova / Alexei Rogonov	Russia	184.24	2014 Golden Spin of Zagreb

Top 10 season's best scores in the pairs' short program
No.	Team	Nation	Score	Event
1	Meagan Duhamel / Eric Radford	Canada	76.98	2015 World Championships
2	Pang Qing / Tong Jian	China	72.59	2015 World Championships
3	Ksenia Stolbova / Fedor Klimov	Russia	72.33	2014–15 Grand Prix Final
4	Sui Wenjing / Han Cong	China	71.63	2015 World Championships
5	Yuko Kavaguti / Alexander Smirnov	Russia	71.59	2015 World Championships
6	Peng Cheng / Zhang Hao	China	69.81	2015 Four Continents Championships
7	Evgenia Tarasova / Vladimir Morozov	Russia	67.71	2015 World Championships
8	Alexa Scimeca / Chris Knierim	United States	65.56	2015 World Championships
9	Wang Xuehan / Wang Lei	China	63.25	2014 Trophée Éric Bompard
10	Yu Xiaoyu / Jin Yang	China	62.71	2014–15 Grand Prix Final

Top 10 season's best scores in the pairs' free skating
No.	Team	Nation	Score	Event
1	Meagan Duhamel / Eric Radford	Canada	146.22	2014–15 Grand Prix Final
2	Ksenia Stolbova / Fedor Klimov	Russia	142.88	2014 Rostelecom Cup
3	Sui Wenjing / Han Cong	China	142.49	2015 World Championships
4	Pang Qing / Tong Jian	China	140.18	2015 World Championships
5	Yuko Kavaguti / Alexander Smirnov	Russia	140.00	2014 Skate America
6	Peng Cheng / Zhang Hao	China	136.96	2015 World Championships
7	Evgenia Tarasova / Vladimir Morozov	Russia	130.75	2015 World Championships
8	Alexa Scimeca / Chris Knierim	United States	127.87	2015 World Team Trophy
9	Kristina Astakhova / Alexei Rogonov	Russia	127.66	2014 Golden Spin of Zagreb
10	Yu Xiaoyu / Jin Yang	China	125.08	2014–15 Grand Prix Final

=== Ice dance ===
Top 10 season's best scores in the combined total (ice dance)
No.	Team	Nation	Score	Event
1	Gabriella Papadakis / Guillaume Cizeron	France	184.28	2015 World Championships
2	Kaitlyn Weaver / Andrew Poje	Canada	182.93	2015 World Team Trophy
3	Madison Chock / Evan Bates	United States	181.34	2015 World Championships
4	Anna Cappellini / Luca Lanotte	Italy	177.50	2015 World Championships
5	Maia Shibutani / Alex Shibutani	United States	172.03	2015 World Championships
6	Madison Hubbell / Zachary Donohue	United States	166.74	2014 Golden Spin of Zagreb
7	Charlène Guignard / Marco Fabbri	Italy	166.46	2014 Golden Spin of Zagreb
8	Piper Gilles / Paul Poirier	Canada	165.22	2015 World Championships
9	Elena Ilinykh / Ruslan Zhiganshin	Russia	164.84	2015 World Championships
10	Alexandra Stepanova / Ivan Bukin	Russia	160.95	2015 European Championships

Top 10 season's best scores in the short dance
No.	Team	Nation	Score	Event
1	Madison Chock / Evan Bates	United States	74.47	2015 World Championships
2	Kaitlyn Weaver / Andrew Poje	Canada	73.14	2015 World Team Trophy
3	Anna Cappellini / Luca Lanotte	Italy	72.39	2015 World Championships
4	Gabriella Papadakis / Guillaume Cizeron	France	71.94	2015 World Championships
5	Elena Ilinykh / Ruslan Zhiganshin	Russia	69.94	2015 European Championships
6	Maia Shibutani / Alex Shibutani	United States	69.65	2015 Four Continents Championships
7	Charlène Guignard / Marco Fabbri	Italy	66.40	2014 Golden Spin of Zagreb
7	Madison Hubbell / Zachary Donohue	United States	66.40	2014 Golden Spin of Zagreb
9	Piper Gilles / Paul Poirier	Canada	65.90	2015 World Championships
10	Alexandra Stepanova / Ivan Bukin	Russia	64.95	2015 European Championships

Top 10 season's best scores in the free dance
No.	Team	Nation	Score	Event
1	Gabriella Papadakis / Guillaume Cizeron	France	112.34	2015 World Championships
2	Kaitlyn Weaver / Andrew Poje	Canada	109.80	2014–15 Grand Prix Final
3	Madison Chock / Evan Bates	United States	106.87	2015 World Championships
4	Anna Cappellini / Luca Lanotte	Italy	105.11	2015 World Championships
5	Maia Shibutani / Alex Shibutani	United States	102.71	2015 World Championships
6	Madison Hubbell / Zachary Donohue	United States	100.34	2014 Golden Spin of Zagreb
7	Charlène Guignard / Marco Fabbri	Italy	100.06	2014 Golden Spin of Zagreb
8	Piper Gilles / Paul Poirier	Canada	99.32	2015 World Championships
9	Penny Coomes / Nicholas Buckland	Great Britain	98.47	2014 Rostelecom Cup
10	Alexandra Stepanova / Ivan Bukin	Russia	97.33	2015 World Championships

== World standings ==
=== Men's singles ===
As of March 28, 2015

No.	Skater	Nation
1	Yuzuru Hanyu	Japan
2	Javier Fernandez	Spain
3	Denis Ten	Kazakhstan
4	Sergei Voronov	Russia
5	Patrick Chan	Canada
6	Tatsuki Machida	Japan
7	Maxim Kovtun	Russia
8	Takahito Mura	Japan
9	Jason Brown	United States
10	Michal Březina	Czech Republic

=== Ladies' singles ===
As of March 28, 2015

No.	Skater	Nation
1	Elizaveta Tuktamysheva	Russia
2	Mao Asada	Japan
3	Yulia Lipnitskaya	Russia
4	Satoko Miyahara	Japan
5	Elena Radionova	Russia
6	Gracie Gold	United States
7	Ashley Wagner	United States
8	Anna Pogorilaya	Russia
9	Adelina Sotnikova	Russia
10	Kanako Murakami	Japan

=== Pairs ===
As of March 26, 2015

No.	Team	Nation
1	Meagan Duhamel / Eric Radford	Canada
2	Tatiana Volosozhar / Maxim Trankov	Russia
3	Ksenia Stolbova / Fedor Klimov	Russia
4	Pang Qing / Tong Jian	China
5	Sui Wenjing / Han Cong	China
6	Peng Cheng / Zhang Hao	China
7	Alexa Scimeca / Chris Knierim	United States
8	Yuko Kavaguti / Alexander Smirnov	Russia
9	Haven Denney / Brandon Frazier	United States
10	Evgenia Tarasova / Vladimir Morozov	Russia

=== Ice dance ===
As of March 27, 2015

No.	Team	Nation
1	Kaitlyn Weaver / Andrew Poje	Canada
2	Madison Chock / Evan Bates	United States
3	Meryl Davis / Charlie White	United States
4	Tessa Virtue / Scott Moir	Canada
5	Gabriella Papadakis / Guillaume Cizeron	France
6	Anna Cappellini / Luca Lanotte	Italy
7	Maia Shibutani / Alex Shibutani	United States
8	Ekaterina Bobrova / Dmitri Soloviev	Russia
9	Piper Gilles / Paul Poirier	Canada
10	Madison Hubbell / Zachary Donohue	United States

== Current season's world rankings ==
=== Men's singles ===
As of March 28, 2015

No.	Skater	Nation
1	Javier Fernandez	Spain
2	Yuzuru Hanyu	Japan
3	Sergei Voronov	Russia
4	Denis Ten	Kazakhstan
5	Jason Brown	United States
6	Maxim Kovtun	Russia
7	Nam Nguyen	Canada
8	Takahito Mura	Japan
9	Michal Březina	Czech Republic
10	Daisuke Murakami	Japan

=== Ladies' singles ===
As of March 28, 2015

No.	Skater	Nation
1	Elizaveta Tuktamysheva	Russia
2	Elena Radionova	Russia
3	Satoko Miyahara	Japan
4	Gracie Gold	United States
5	Rika Hongo	Japan
6	Ashley Wagner	United States
7	Anna Pogorilaya	Russia
8	Polina Edmunds	United States
9	Kanako Murakami	Japan
10	Angelina Kuchvalska	Latvia

=== Pairs ===
As of March 26, 2015

No.	Team	Nation
1	Meagan Duhamel / Eric Radford	Canada
2	Sui Wenjing / Han Cong	China
3	Yuko Kavaguti / Alexander Smirnov	Russia
4	Ksenia Stolbova / Fedor Klimov	Russia
5	Peng Cheng / Zhang Hao	China
6	Alexa Scimeca / Chris Knierim	United States
7	Haven Denney / Brandon Frazier	United States
8	Evgenia Tarasova / Vladimir Morozov	Russia
9	Nicole Della Monica / Matteo Guarise	Italy
10	Yu Xiaoyu / Jin Yang	China

=== Ice dance ===
As of March 27, 2015

No.	Team	Nation
1	Gabriella Papadakis / Guillaume Cizeron	France
2	Kaitlyn Weaver / Andrew Poje	Canada
3	Madison Chock / Evan Bates	United States
4	Maia Shibutani / Alex Shibutani	United States
5	Piper Gilles / Paul Poirier	Canada
6	Alexandra Stepanova / Ivan Bukin	Russia
7	Charlene Guignard / Marco Fabbri	Italy
8	Nelli Zhiganshina / Alexander Gazsi	Germany
9	Ksenia Monko / Kirill Khaliavin	Russia
10	Sara Hurtado / Adria Diaz	Spain
