= 2012–13 ISU Grand Prix of Figure Skating =

- Type: Grand Prix
- Date: October 19 – December 9, 2012
- Season: 2012–13
- Previous: 2011–12 Grand Prix
- Next: 2013–14 Grand Prix

The 2012–13 ISU Grand Prix of Figure Skating was a series of senior international figure skating competitions in the 2012–13 season. Skaters competed in the disciplines of men's singles, ladies' singles, pair skating, and ice dancing. Skaters earned points based on their placement at each event and the top six in each discipline qualified to compete at the Grand Prix Final, held in Sochi, Russia.

Organized by the International Skating Union, the Grand Prix series ran from October 13 – December 9, 2012. Skaters competed for medals, prize money, and a chance to compete in the Grand Prix Final. The series set the stage for the 2013 European, Four Continents, and World Championships, as well as each country's national championships.

The corresponding series for junior-level skaters was the 2012–13 ISU Junior Grand Prix.

== Schedule ==
The ISU announced the following schedule of events taking place in autumn 2012:

| Date | Event | Location |
|---|---|---|
| October 19–21 | 2012 Skate America | Kent, Washington, United States |
| October 26–28 | 2012 Skate Canada International | Windsor, Ontario, Canada |
| November 2–4 | 2012 Cup of China | Shanghai, China |
| November 9–11 | 2012 Rostelecom Cup | Moscow, Russia |
| November 16–18 | 2012 Trophée Éric Bompard | Paris, France |
| November 23–25 | 2012 NHK Trophy | Miyagi, Japan |
| December 6–9 | 2012–13 Grand Prix Final | Sochi, Russia |

== Rule changes ==
Between seasons, the ISU eliminated the option for seeded skaters to compete at a third GP event and the option for pairs to compete in both the senior Grand Prix and Junior Grand Prix in the same season.

== General requirements ==
Skaters who reached the age of 14 by July 1, 2012 were eligible to compete on the senior Grand Prix circuit.

Prior to competing in a Grand Prix event, skaters were required to have earned the following scores:

| Discipline | Minimum |
|---|---|
| Men | 159.66 |
| Ladies | 113.43 |
| Pairs | 120.90 |
| Ice dance | 109.59 |
Minimums not required for host country skaters. Skaters who need the minimum score may compete at: U.S. International F.S. Classic; 2012 Nebelhorn Trophy; 2012 Ondrej Nepela Memorial; 2012 Finlandia Trophy (no pairs event); 2012 Cup of Nice

== Assignments ==
The International Skating Union released the initial list of Grand Prix assignments on May 21, 2012: Due to the 2012 China anti-Japanese demonstrations, the Japan Skating Federation said it might withdraw its competitors from the Cup of China if the organizers did not provide security guarantees. The event was held without incident.

=== Men ===
| Skater | Assignment(s) |
|---|---|
| Jeremy Abbott | Skate America, Trophée Éric Bompard |
| Florent Amodio | Skate Canada International, Trophée Éric Bompard |
| Michal Březina | Skate America, Rostelecom Cup |
| Zhan Bush | Rostelecom Cup |
| Patrick Chan | Skate Canada International, Rostelecom Cup |
| Artur Dmitriev, Jr. | Cup of China |
| Richard Dornbush | Rostelecom Cup, NHK Trophy |
| Javier Fernández | Skate Canada International, NHK Trophy |
| Liam Firus | Skate Canada International |
| Artur Gachinski | Skate Canada International, Rostelecom Cup |
| Jinlin Guan | Cup of China, Trophée Éric Bompard |
| Yuzuru Hanyu | Skate America, NHK Trophy |
| Jorik Hendrickx | Trophée Éric Bompard |
| Brian Joubert | Cup of China, Trophée Éric Bompard |
| Takahiko Kozuka | Skate America, Rostelecom Cup |
| Tatsuki Machida | Skate America, Cup of China |
| Armin Mahbanoozadeh | Skate America |
| Alexander Majorov | Skate America |
| Konstantin Menshov | Skate America, Rostelecom Cup |
| Ross Miner | Skate Canada International, NHK Trophy |
| Takahito Mura | Skate Canada International, Trophée Éric Bompard |
| Daisuke Murakami | NHK Trophy |
| Nobunari Oda | Skate Canada International, Rostelecom Cup |
| Douglas Razzano | Skate America |
| Kevin Reynolds | Cup of China, NHK Trophy |
| Adam Rippon | Cup of China, NHK Trophy |
| Andrei Rogozine | NHK Trophy |
| Song Nan | Cup of China, Trophée Éric Bompard |
| Daisuke Takahashi | Cup of China, NHK Trophy |
| Denis Ten | Skate Canada International, Rostelecom Cup |
| Tomáš Verner | Skate America, Trophée Éric Bompard |
| Sergei Voronov | Cup of China, NHK Trophy |
| Johnny Weir | Rostelecom Cup, Trophée Éric Bompard |

=== Ladies ===
| Skater | Assignment(s) |
|---|---|
| Mao Asada | Cup of China, NHK Trophy |
| Sofia Biryukova | Cup of China, NHK Trophy |
| Alissa Czisny | NHK Trophy |
| Rachael Flatt | Skate America |
| Christina Gao | Skate America, Trophée Éric Bompard |
| Elene Gedevanishvili | Skate Canada International, NHK Trophy |
| Bingwa Geng | Cup of China |
| Gracie Gold | Skate Canada International, Rostelecom Cup |
| Sarah Hecken | Skate America |
| Joshi Helgesson | Cup of China |
| Viktoria Helgesson | Skate America, Rostelecom Cup |
| Haruka Imai | Skate America, NHK Trophy |
| Polina Korobeynikova | Rostelecom Cup, Trophée Éric Bompard |
| Kiira Korpi | Cup of China, Rostelecom Cup |
| Amelie Lacoste | Skate Canada International |
| Alena Leonova | Skate America, Rostelecom Cup |
| Zijun Li | NHK Trophy |
| Yulia Lipnitskaya | Cup of China, Trophée Éric Bompard |
| Ksenia Makarova | Skate Canada International, NHK Trophy |
| Valentina Marchei | Skate America, Rostelecom Cup |
| Lena Marrocco | Trophée Éric Bompard |
| Maé Bérénice Méité | Skate America |
| Kanako Murakami | Skate Canada International, Rostelecom Cup |
| Mirai Nagasu | Cup of China, NHK Trophy |
| Kaetlyn Osmond | Skate Canada International |
| Polina Shelepen | NHK Trophy, Skate Canada International |
| Adelina Sotnikova | Skate America, Rostelecom Cup |
| Akiko Suzuki | Skate Canada International, NHK Trophy |
| Elizaveta Tuktamysheva | Skate Canada International, Trophée Éric Bompard |
| Ashley Wagner | Skate America, Trophée Éric Bompard |
| Agnes Zawadzki | Rostelecom Cup, NHK Trophy |
| Caroline Zhang | Skate Canada International, Rostelecom Cup |
| Kexin Zhang | Cup of China, Trophée Éric Bompard |

=== Pairs ===
| Skater | Assignment(s) |
|---|---|
| Vera Bazarova / Yuri Larionov | Rostelecom Cup, NHK Trophy |
| Stefania Berton / Ondřej Hotárek | Skate Canada International, Trophée Éric Bompard |
| Marissa Castelli / Simon Shnapir | NHK Trophy |
| Lindsay Davis / Mark Ladwig | NHK Trophy |
| Caydee Denney / John Coughlin | Skate America, Rostelecom Cup |
| Gretchen Donlan / Andrew Speroff | Skate America |
| Jessica Dube / Sebastien Wolfe | Skate America, Rostelecom Cup |
| Meagan Duhamel / Eric Radford | Skate Canada International, Trophée Éric Bompard |
| Maylin Hausch / Daniel Wende | Rostelecom Cup |
| Vanessa James / Morgan Cipres | Skate America |
| Yuko Kawaguchi / Alexander Smirnov | Cup of China, Trophée Éric Bompard |
| Stacey Kemp / David King | Skate America |
| Paige Lawrence / Rudi Swiegers | Skate Canada International, Rostelecom Cup |
| Anastasia Martiusheva / Alexei Rogonov | Rostelecom Cup, NHK Trophy |
| Kirsten Moore-Towers / Dylan Moscovitch | Cup of China, NHK Trophy |
| Qing Pang / Jian Tong | Skate America, Cup of China |
| Peng Cheng / Hao Zhang | Cup of China, Trophée Éric Bompard |
| Daria Popova / Bruno Massot | Trophée Éric Bompard |
| Aliona Savchenko / Robin Szolkowy | Skate Canada International, Trophée Éric Bompard |
| Ksenia Stolbova / Fedor Klimov | Cup of China, Trophée Éric Bompard |
| Mari Vartmann / Aaron Van Cleave | NHK Trophy |
| Tiffany Vise / Don Baldwin | Skate Canada International |
| Tatiana Volosozhar / Maxim Trankov | Skate America, Rostelecom Cup |
| Caitlin Yankowskas / Joshua Reagan | NHK Trophy |

=== Ice dancing ===
| Skater | Assignment(s) |
|---|---|
| Lorenza Alessandrini / Simone Vaturi | Skate America |
| Ekaterina Bobrova / Dmitri Soloviev | Skate America, Cup of China |
| Anna Cappellini / Luca Lanotte | Skate Canada International, Trophée Éric Bompard |
| Pernelle Carron / Lloyd Jones | Skate Canada International, Trophée Éric Bompard |
| Madison Chock / Evan Bates | Cup of China |
| Penny Coomes / Nicholas Buckland | Rostelecom Cup, NHK Trophy |
| Meryl Davis / Charlie White | Skate America, NHK Trophy |
| Piper Gilles / Paul Poirier | Skate Canada International, Trophée Éric Bompard |
| Charlene Guignard / Marco Fabbri | Cup of China |
| Xintong Huang / Xun Zheng | Cup of China, NHK Trophy |
| Madison Hubbell / Zachary Donohue | Skate Canada International, Trophée Éric Bompard |
| Elena Ilinykh / Nikita Katsalapov | Rostelecom Cup, NHK Trophy |
| Lynn Kriengkrairut / Logan Giulietti-Schmitt | Skate America |
| Ksenia Monko / Kirill Khaliavin | Rostelecom Cup |
| Nicole Orford / Thomas Williams | Rostelecom Cup, NHK Trophy |
| Nathalie Péchalat / Fabian Bourzat | Cup of China, Trophée Éric Bompard |
| Kharis Ralph / Asher Hill | Skate Canada International |
| Cathy Reed / Chris Reed | NHK Trophy |
| Ekaterina Riazanova / Ilia Tkachenko | Skate Canada International, Trophée Éric Bompard |
| Maia Shibutani / Alex Shibutani | Rostelecom Cup, NHK Trophy |
| Victoria Sinitsina / Ruslan Zhiganshin | Cup of China, Rostelecom Cup |
| Isabella Tobias / Deividas Stagniunas | Skate America |
| Tessa Virtue / Scott Moir | Skate Canada International, Rostelecom Cup |
| Kaitlyn Weaver / Andrew Poje | Skate America, Cup of China |
| Xiaoyang Yu / Chen Wang | NHK Trophy |
| Nelli Zhiganshina / Alexander Gazsi | Skate America, Rostelecom Cup |
| Julia Zlobina / Alexei Sitnikov | Skate Canada International |

=== Changes to preliminary assignments ===
Changes to the initial assignments:

==== Skate America ====
- Evan Lysacek withdrew due to injury; Armin Mahbanoozadeh replaced him.

==== Skate Canada International ====
- Mary Beth Marley / Rockne Brubaker withdrew due to split.
- Katarina Gerboldt / Alexander Enbert withdrew due to Gerboldt's injury.

==== Cup of China ====
- Samuel Contesti withdrew due to retirement, replaced by Sergei Voronov.
- Carolina Kostner withdrew due to insufficient fitness.
- Miki Ando withdrew because she was unable to find a permanent coach.
- Wenjing Sui / Cong Han withdrew due to Sui's injury.
- Narumi Takahashi / Mervin Tran withdrew because she required surgery on a repeatedly dislocating left shoulder.
- Caitlin Yankowskas / Joshua Reagan withdrew due to Reagan's rib injury.

==== Rostelecom Cup ====
- Alexandra Nazarova / Maxim Nikitin withdrew and were replaced by Nicole Orford / Thomas Williams
- Mari Vartmann / Aaron Van Cleave withdrew after she broke his cheekbone during a twist lift.
- Johnny Weir withdrew in competition due to right hip injury

==== Trophée Éric Bompard ====
- Samuel Contesti withdrew due to retirement, replaced by Jinlin Guan.
- Carolina Kostner withdrew due to insufficient fitness.
- Miki Ando withdrew because she was unable to find a permanent coach.
- Johnny Weir withdrew due to right hip injury
- Aliona Savchenko / Robin Szolkowy withdrew due to Savchenko's severe sinus infection.

==== NHK Trophy ====
- Mary Beth Marley / Rockne Brubaker withdrew due to split.
- Wenjing Sui / Cong Han withdrew due to Sui's injury.
- Narumi Takahashi / Mervin Tran withdrew because she required surgery on a repeatedly dislocating left shoulder.
- Caitlin Yankowskas / Joshua Reagan withdrew due to Reagan's rib injury. Replaced by Alexa Scimeca / Chris Knierim.
- Anastasia Martiusheva / Alexei Rogonov and Nicole Della Monica / Matteo Guarise replaced withdrawals in the pairs event.
- Polina Shelepen withdrew due to worsening of a long-standing ankle injury.
- Alissa Czisny withdrew in order to continue her recovery from surgery and was replaced by Mirai Nagasu.
- Mari Vartmann / Aaron Van Cleave withdrew due to Van Cleave's broken cheekbone.

== Medal summary ==
| Event | Discipline | Gold | Silver | Bronze |
|---|---|---|---|---|
| Skate America | Men | (Japan) Takahiko Kozuka | (Japan) Yuzuru Hanyu | (Japan) Tatsuki Machida |
| Skate America | Ladies | (United States) Ashley Wagner | (United States) Christina Gao | (Russia) Adelina Sotnikova |
| Skate America | Pairs | (Russia) Tatiana Volosozhar / Maxim Trankov | (China) Pang Qing / Tong Jian | (United States) Caydee Denney / John Coughlin |
| Skate America | Ice dancing | (United States) Meryl Davis / Charlie White | (Russia) Ekaterina Bobrova / Dmitri Soloviev | (Canada) Kaitlyn Weaver / Andrew Poje |

| Event | Discipline | Gold | Silver | Bronze |
|---|---|---|---|---|
| Skate Canada | Men | (Spain) Javier Fernández | (Canada) Patrick Chan | (Japan) Nobunari Oda |
| Skate Canada | Ladies | (Canada) Kaetlyn Osmond | (Japan) Akiko Suzuki | (Japan) Kanako Murakami |
| Skate Canada | Pairs | (Germany) Aliona Savchenko / Robin Szolkowy | (Canada) Meagan Duhamel / Eric Radford | (Italy) Stefania Berton / Ondřej Hotárek |
| Skate Canada | Ice dancing | (Canada) Tessa Virtue / Scott Moir | (Italy) Anna Cappelini / Luca Lanotte | (Russia) Ekaterina Riazanova / Ilia Tkachenko |

| Event | Discipline | Gold | Silver | Bronze |
|---|---|---|---|---|
| Cup of China | Men | (Japan) Tatsuki Machida | (Japan) Daisuke Takahashi | (Russia) Sergei Voronov |
| Cup of China | Ladies | (Japan) Mao Asada | (Russia) Yulia Lipnitskaya | (Finland) Kiira Korpi |
| Cup of China | Pairs | (China) Pang Qing / Tong Jian | (Russia) Yuko Kavaguti / Alexander Smirnov | (Russia) Ksenia Stolbova / Fedor Klimov |
| Cup of China | Ice dancing | (France) Nathalie Péchalat / Fabian Bourzat | (Russia) Ekaterina Bobrova / Dmitri Soloviev | (Canada) Kaitlyn Weaver / Andrew Poje |

| Event | Discipline | Gold | Silver | Bronze |
|---|---|---|---|---|
| Rostelecom Cup | Men | (Canada) Patrick Chan | (Japan) Takahiko Kozuka | (Czech Republic) Michal Březina |
| Rostelecom Cup | Ladies | (Finland) Kiira Korpi | (United States) Gracie Gold | (United States) Agnes Zawadzki |
| Rostelecom Cup | Pairs | (Russia) Tatiana Volosozhar / Maxim Trankov | (Russia) Vera Bazarova / Yuri Larionov | (United States) Caydee Denney / John Coughlin |
| Rostelecom Cup | Ice dancing | (Canada) Tessa Virtue / Scott Moir | (Russia) Elena Ilinykh / Nikita Katsalapov | (Russia) Victoria Sinitsina / Ruslan Zhiganshin |

| Event | Discipline | Gold | Silver | Bronze |
|---|---|---|---|---|
| Trophée Eric Bompard | Men | (Japan) Takahito Mura | (United States) Jeremy Abbott | (France) Florent Amodio |
| Trophée Eric Bompard | Ladies | (United States) Ashley Wagner | (Russia) Elizaveta Tuktamysheva | (Russia) Yulia Lipnitskaya |
| Trophée Eric Bompard | Pairs | (Russia) Yuko Kavaguti / Alexander Smirnov | (Canada) Meagan Duhamel / Eric Radford | (Italy) Stefania Berton / Ondřej Hotárek |
| Trophée Eric Bompard | Ice dancing | (France) Nathalie Péchalat / Fabian Bourzat | (Italy) Anna Cappelini / Luca Lanotte | (Russia) Ekaterina Riazanova / Ilia Tkachenko |

| Event | Discipline | Gold | Silver | Bronze |
|---|---|---|---|---|
| NHK Trophy | Men | (Japan) Yuzuru Hanyu | (Japan) Daisuke Takahashi | (United States) Ross Miner |
| NHK Trophy | Ladies | (Japan) Mao Asada | (Japan) Akiko Suzuki | (United States) Mirai Nagasu |
| NHK Trophy | Pairs | (Russia) Vera Bazarova / Yuri Larionov | (Canada) Kirsten Moore-Towers / Dylan Moscovitch | (United States) Marissa Castelli / Simon Shnapir |
| NHK Trophy | Ice dancing | (United States) Meryl Davis / Charlie White | (Russia) Elena Ilinykh / Nikita Katsalapov | (United States) Maia Shibutani / Alex Shibutani |

| Event | Discipline | Gold | Silver | Bronze |
|---|---|---|---|---|
| Grand Prix Final | Men | (Japan) Daisuke Takahashi | (Japan) Yuzuru Hanyu | (Canada) Patrick Chan |
| Grand Prix Final | Ladies | (Japan) Mao Asada | (United States) Ashley Wagner | (Japan) Akiko Suzuki |
| Grand Prix Final | Pairs | (Russia) Tatiana Volosozhar / Maxim Trankov | (Russia) Vera Bazarova / Yuri Larionov | (China) Pang Qing / Tong Jian |
| Grand Prix Final | Ice dancing | (United States) Meryl Davis / Charlie White | (Canada) Tessa Virtue / Scott Moir | (France) Nathalie Péchalat / Fabian Bourzat |

== Top Grand Prix scores ==
Skaters ranked according to total score. The short and free columns break down the total score of a skater's best overall event into the short and free program.

Top senior Grand Prix scores after all 7 events: Skate America, Skate Canada, Cup of China, Rostelecom Cup, Trophée Eric Bompard, NHK Trophy, and Grand Prix Final.

=== Men ===
| Rank | Name | Country | Total | Short | Free | Event | Date |
|---|---|---|---|---|---|---|---|
| 1 | Daisuke Takahashi | Japan | 269.40 | 92.29 | 177.11 | Grand Prix Final | 2012-12-08 |
| 2 | Yuzuru Hanyu | Japan | 264.29 | 87.17 | 177.12 | Grand Prix Final | 2012-12-08 |
| 3 | Patrick Chan | Canada | 262.35 | 85.44 | 176.91 | Rostelecom Cup | 2012-11-10 |
| 4 | Javier Fernández | Spain | 258.62 | 80.19 | 178.43 | Grand Prix Final | 2012-12-08 |
| 5 | Takahiko Kozuka | Japan | 253.27 | 86.39 | 166.88 | Grand Prix Final | 2012-12-08 |
| 6 | Nobunari Oda | Japan | 238.34 | 82.14 | 156.20 | Skate Canada | 2012-10-27 |
| 7 | Tatsuki Machida | Japan | 236.92 | 83.48 | 153.44 | Cup of China | 2012-11-03 |
| 8 | Ross Miner | United States | 235.37 | 73.41 | 161.96 | NHK Trophy | 2012-11-24 |
| 9 | Takahito Mura | Japan | 230.68 | 76.65 | 154.12 | Trophée Eric Bompard | 2012-11-17 |
| 10 | Jeremy Abbott | United States | 227.63 | 81.18 | 146.45 | Trophée Eric Bompard | 2012-11-17 |
| 11 | Michal Březina | Czech Republic | 224.56 | 73.83 | 150.73 | Rostelecom Cup | 2012-11-10 |
| 12 | Konstantin Menshov | Russia | 223.72 | 76.73 | 146.99 | Rostelecom Cup | 2012-11-10 |
| 13 | Florent Amodio | France | 218.72 | 74.61 | 144.11 | Skate Canada | 2012-10-27 |
| 14 | Sergei Voronov | Russia | 217.61 | 73.58 | 144.03 | Cup of China | 2012-11-03 |
| 15 | Richard Dornbush | United States | 217.56 | 70.05 | 147.51 | NHK Trophy | 2012-11-24 |

=== Ladies ===
| Rank | Name | Country | Total | Short | Free | Event | Date |
|---|---|---|---|---|---|---|---|
| 1 | Mao Asada | Japan | 196.80 | 66.96 | 129.84 | Grand Prix Final | 2012-12-08 |
| 2 | Ashley Wagner | United States | 190.63 | 63.09 | 127.54 | Trophée Eric Bompard | 2012-11-17 |
| 3 | Akiko Suzuki | Japan | 185.22 | 58.60 | 126.62 | NHK Trophy | 2012-11-24 |
| 4 | Elizaveta Tuktamysheva | Russia | 179.62 | 58.26 | 121.36 | Trophée Eric Bompard | 2012-11-17 |
| 5 | Yulia Lipnitskaya | Russia | 179.31 | 63.55 | 115.76 | Trophée Eric Bompard | 2012-11-17 |
| 6 | Kiira Korpi | Finland | 177.19 | 61.55 | 115.64 | Rostelecom Cup | 2012-11-10 |
| 7 | Mirai Nagasu | United States | 176.68 | 61.18 | 115.50 | NHK Trophy | 2012-11-24 |
| 8 | Kaetlyn Osmond | Canada | 176.45 | 60.56 | 115.89 | Skate Canada | 2012-10-27 |
| 9 | Gracie Gold | United States | 175.03 | 62.16 | 112.87 | Rostelecom Cup | 2012-11-10 |
| 10 | Christina Gao | United States | 174.25 | 56.63 | 117.62 | Skate America | 2012-10-21 |
| 11 | Li Zijun | China | 174.11 | 59.62 | 114.49 | NHK Trophy | 2012-11-24 |
| 12 | Adelina Sotnikova | Russia | 168.96 | 58.93 | 110.03 | Skate America | 2012-10-21 |
| 13 | Kanako Murakami | Japan | 168.04 | 56.21 | 111.83 | Skate Canada | 2012-10-27 |
| 14 | Agnes Zawadzki | United States | 166.61 | 60.18 | 106.43 | Rostelecom Cup | 2012-11-10 |
| 15 | Elene Gedevanishvili | Georgia | 160.52 | 60.80 | 99.72 | Skate Canada | 2012-10-27 |

=== Pairs ===
| Rank | Name | Country | Total | Short | Free | Event | Date |
|---|---|---|---|---|---|---|---|
| 1 | Tatiana Volosozhar / Maxim Trankov | Russia | 207.53 | 74.74 | 132.79 | Rostelecom Cup | 2012-11-10 |
| 2 | Vera Bazarova / Yuri Larionov | Russia | 201.60 | 70.14 | 131.46 | Grand Prix Final | 2012-12-08 |
| 3 | Aliona Savchenko / Robin Szolkowy | Germany | 201.36 | 72.26 | 129.10 | Skate Canada | 2012-10-27 |
| 4 | Pang Qing / Tong Jian | China | 192.81 | 64.74 | 128.07 | Grand Prix Final | 2012-12-08 |
| 5 | Meagan Duhamel / Eric Radford | Canada | 190.49 | 64.49 | 126.00 | Skate Canada | 2012-10-27 |
| 6 | Yuko Kavaguti / Alexander Smirnov | Russia | 187.99 | 66.78 | 121.21 | Trophée Eric Bompard | 2012-11-17 |
| 7 | Kirsten Moore-Towers / Dylan Moscovitch | Canada | 180.63 | 65.14 | 115.49 | NHK Trophy | 2012-11-25 |
| 8 | Caydee Denney / John Coughlin | United States | 179.21 | 59.02 | 120.19 | Rostelecom Cup | 2012-11-10 |
| 9 | Marissa Castelli / Simon Shnapir | United States | 174.51 | 61.85 | 112.66 | NHK Trophy | 2012-11-25 |
| 10 | Ksenia Stolbova / Fedor Klimov | Russia | 172.55 | 56.66 | 115.89 | Cup of China | 2012-11-03 |
| 11 | Stefania Berton / Ondrej Hotarek | Italy | 172.03 | 59.79 | 112.24 | Skate Canada | 2012-10-27 |
| 12 | Peng Cheng / Zhang Hao | China | 167.76 | 59.92 | 107.84 | Trophee Eric Bompard | 2012-11-17 |
| 13 | Vanessa James / Morgan Cipres | France | 167.66 | 55.76 | 111.90 | Skate America | 2012-10-20 |
| 14 | Alexa Scimeca / Chris Knierim | United States | 163.10 | 54.41 | 108.69 | NHK Trophy | 2012-11-25 |
| 15 | Anastasia Martiusheva / Alexei Rogonov | Russia | 162.25 | 57.07 | 105.18 | NHK Trophy | 2012-11-25 |

=== Ice dancing ===
| Rank | Name | Country | Total | Short | Free | Event | Date |
|---|---|---|---|---|---|---|---|
| 1 | Meryl Davis / Charlie White | United States | 183.39 | 73.20 | 110.19 | Grand Prix Final | 2012-12-08 |
| 2 | Tessa Virtue / Scott Moir | Canada | 179.83 | 71.27 | 108.56 | Grand Prix Final | 2012-12-08 |
| 3 | Nathalie Péchalat / Fabian Bourzat | France | 170.18 | 68.70 | 101.48 | Grand Prix Final | 2012-12-08 |
| 4 | Anna Cappellini / Luca Lanotte | Italy | 165.64 | 66.11 | 99.53 | Grand Prix Final | 2012-12-08 |
| 5 | Ekaterina Bobrova / Dmitri Soloviev | Russia | 159.95 | 62.91 | 97.04 | Skate America | 2012-10-21 |
| 6 | Kaitlyn Weaver / Andrew Poje | Canada | 158.97 | 65.59 | 93.38 | Cup of China | 2012-11-03 |
| 7 | Elena Ilinykh / Nikita Katsalapov | Russia | 158.46 | 65.70 | 92.76 | Rostelecom Cup | 2012-11-10 |
| 8 | Maia Shibutani / Alex Shibutani | United States | 154.56 | 60.84 | 93.72 | NHK Trophy | 2012-11-24 |
| 9 | Madison Chock / Evan Bates | United States | 149.54 | 59.26 | 90.28 | Cup of China | 2012-11-03 |
| 10 | Ekaterina Riazanova / Ilia Tkachenko | Russia | 146.03 | 58.23 | 87.80 | Trophée Eric Bompard | 2012-11-17 |
| 11 | Madison Hubbell / Zachary Donohue | United States | 145.23 | 56.54 | 88.69 | Trophee Eric Bompard | 2012-11-17 |
| 12 | Victoria Sinitsina / Ruslan Zhiganshin | Russia | 145.08 | 60.85 | 84.23 | Rostelecom Cup | 2012-11-10 |
| 13 | Lynn Kriengkrairut / Logan Giulietti-Schmitt | United States | 141.41 | 53.89 | 87.52 | Skate America | 2012-10-21 |
| 14 | Nelli Zhiganshina / Alexander Gazsi | Germany | 140.54 | 55.53 | 85.01 | Rostelecom Cup | 2012-11-10 |
| 15 | Julia Zlobina / Alexei Sitnikov | Azerbaijan | 140.30 | 54.76 | 85.54 | Trophee Eric Bompard | 2012-11-17 |

== Prize money and Grand Prix Final qualification points ==
The top finishers will earn prize money, as well as points toward qualifying for the Grand Prix Final, according to the chart below.

| Placement | Points | Prize money: Pre-final event | Prize money: GP Final |
|---|---|---|---|
| 1st | 15 | US $18,000 | $25,000 |
| 2nd | 13 | US $13,000 | $18,000 |
| 3rd | 11 | US $9,000 | $12,000 |
| 4th | 9 | US $3,000 | $6,000 |
| 5th | 7 | US $2,000 | $4,000 |
| 6th | 5 | - | $3,000 |
| 7th | 4* | - | - |
| 8th | 3* | - | - |
The sign * denotes not applicable to pairs and ice dancing. Pairs and ice dancers split the sum. GP total: US $180,000; GP Final total: US $272,000.

After the final event, the 2012 NHK Trophy, the six skaters/teams with the most points advanced to the Grand Prix Final. If a skater or team competed at three events, their two best results counted toward the standings. There were seven tie-breakers:

1. Highest placement at an event. If a skater placed 1st and 3rd, the tiebreaker was the 1st place, and that beats a skater who placed 2nd in both events.
2. Highest combined total scores in both events. If a skater earned 200 points at one event and 250 at a second, that skater would win in the second tie-break over a skater who earned 200 points at one event and 150 at another.
3. Participated in two events.
4. Highest combined scores in the free skating/free dancing portion of both events.
5. Highest individual score in the free skating/free dancing portion from one event.
6. Highest combined scores in the short program/original dance of both events.
7. Highest number of total participants at the events.

If there is still a tie, the tie is considered unbreakable and the tied skaters would all qualify for the Grand Prix Final.

=== Qualification standings ===
Bold denotes Grand Prix Final qualification.

| Points | Men | Ladies | Pairs | Ice dance |
|---|---|---|---|---|
| 30 | | (United States) **Ashley Wagner** (Japan) **Mao Asada** | (Russia) **Tatiana Volosozhar / Maxim Trankov** | (United States) **Meryl Davis / Charlie White** (Canada) **Tessa Virtue / Scott Moir** (France) **Nathalie Péchalat / Fabian Bourzat** |
| 28 | (Canada) **Patrick Chan** (Japan) **Yuzuru Hanyu** (Japan) **Takahiko Kozuka** | | (Russia) **Vera Bazarova / Yuri Larionov** (China) **Pang Qing / Tong Jian** (Russia) **Yuko Kavaguti / Alexander Smirnov** | |
| 26 | (Japan) **Tatsuki Machida** (Japan) **Daisuke Takahashi** | (Finland) **Kiira Korpi** (Japan) **Akiko Suzuki** | (Canada) **Meagan Duhamel / Eric Radford** | (Russia) **Ekaterina Bobrova / Dmitri Soloviev** (Russia) **Elena Ilinykh / Nikita Katsalapov** (Italy) **Anna Cappelini / Luca Lanotte** |
| 24 | (Spain) **Javier Fernández** | (Russia) Yulia Lipnitskaya (withdrew) | | |
| 22 | | (Russia) **Elizaveta Tuktamysheva** (United States) **Christina Gao** (called up) | (Canada) **Kirsten Moore-Towers / Dylan Moscovitch** (United States) Caydee Denney / John Coughlin (Italy) Stefania Berton / Ondřej Hotárek | (Canada) Kaitlyn Weaver / Andrew Poje (Russia) Ekaterina Riazanova / Ilia Tkachenko |
| 20 | (United States) Jeremy Abbott (France) Florent Amodio | (United States) Mirai Nagasu (Japan) Kanako Murakami | | (United States) Maia Shibutani / Alex Shibutani |
| 19 | | | | |
| 18 | (Japan) Takahito Mura (Japan) Nobunari Oda (United States) Ross Miner (Russia) Konstantin Menshov | (United States) Agnes Zawadzki (Russia) Adelina Sotnikova | (Russia) Ksenia Stolbova / Fedor Klimov (United States) Marissa Castelli / Simon Shnapir (Canada) Paige Lawrence / Rudi Swiegers | |
| 17 | | (United States) Gracie Gold | | |
| 16 | (Czech Republic) Michal Březina | (China) Li Zijun | (China) Peng Cheng / Zhang Hao | (Russia) Victoria Sinitsina / Ruslan Zhiganshin (United States) Madison Hubbell / Zachary Donohue |
| 15 | (Russia) Sergei Voronov | (Canada) Kaetlyn Osmond | (Germany) Aliona Savchenko / Robin Szolkowy | |
| 14 | | | (France) Vanessa James / Morgan Ciprès (Russia) Anastasia Martiusheva / Alexei Rogonov | (Canada) Piper Gilles / Paul Poirer (Germany) Nelli Zhiganshina / Alexander Gazsi |
| 13 | | | | |
| 12 | (United States) Adam Rippon (United States) Richard Dornbush (Canada) Kevin Reynolds | (Georgia (country)) Elene Gedevanishvili (France) Maé Bérénice Méité | | (Azerbaijan) Julia Zlobina / Alexei Sitnikov |
| 11 | | | | |
| 10 | | (Japan) Haruka Imai | (United States) Tiffany Vise / Don Baldwin | |
| 9 | (France) Brian Joubert (China) Guan Jinlin | (Italy) Valentina Marchei (Russia) Alena Leonova (Russia) Ksenia Makarova (Russia) Polina Korobeynikova | (United States) Alexa Scimeca / Chris Knierim | (Canada) Nicole Orford / Thomas Williams (United States) Madison Chock / Evan Bates (United States) Lynn Kriengkrairut / Logan Giulietti-Schmitt |
| 8 | | (Canada) Amélie Lacoste | | |
| 7 | (China) Song Nan | | (France) Daria Popova / Bruno Massot | (Italy) Charlène Guignard / Marco Fabbri (Japan) Cathy Reed / Chris Reed |
| 6 | (Czech Republic) Tomáš Verner | (Sweden) Viktoria Helgesson | | |
| 5 | (Kazakhstan) Denis Ten (China) Wang Yi | | (United States) Lindsay Davis / Mark Ladwig (China) Wang Wenting / Zhang Yan (United States) Gretchen Donlan / Andrew Speroff | (United Kingdom) Penny Coomes / Nicholas Buckland (Russia) Ksenia Monko / Kirill Khaliavin (Italy) Lorenza Alessandrini / Simone Vaturi |
| 4 | (Russia) Artur Gachinski (United States) Armin Mahbanoozadeh (Canada) Elladj Baldé (France) Chafik Besseghier | (Sweden) Joshi Helgesson (Estonia) Jelena Glebova | | |
| 3 | (Russia) Zhan Bush | (United Kingdom) Jenna McCorkell (China) Zhang Ying | | |

== Medal standings ==
| Rank | Nation | Gold | Silver | Bronze | Total |
|---|---|---|---|---|---|
| 1 | Japan (JPN) | 8 | 7 | 4 | 19 |
| 2 | Russia (RUS) | 5 | 9 | 7 | 21 |
| 3 | United States (USA) | 5 | 4 | 7 | 16 |
| 4 | Canada (CAN) | 4 | 5 | 3 | 12 |
| 5 | France (FRA) | 2 | 0 | 2 | 4 |
| 6 | China (CHN) | 1 | 1 | 1 | 3 |
| 7 | Finland (FIN) | 1 | 0 | 1 | 2 |
| 8 | Germany (GER) | 1 | 0 | 0 | 1 |
| 8 | Spain (ESP) | 1 | 0 | 0 | 1 |
| 10 | Italy (ITA) | 0 | 2 | 2 | 4 |
| 11 | Czech Republic (CZE) | 0 | 0 | 1 | 1 |
| Totals (11 entries) | | 28 | 28 | 28 | 84 |
