= 2010 Nebelhorn Trophy =

- Type: Senior International
- Date: September 23 – 26
- Season: 2010–11
- Location: Oberstdorf
- Venue: Eislaufzentrum Oberstdorf

Champions
- Men's singles: (Japan) Tatsuki Machida
- Ladies' singles: (Finland) Kiira Korpi
- Pairs: (Russia) Vera Bazarova / Yuri Larionov
- Ice dance: (France) Nathalie Péchalat / Fabian Bourzat
- Previous: 2009 Nebelhorn Trophy
- Next: 2011 Nebelhorn Trophy

The 2010 Nebelhorn Trophy took place between September 23 and 26, 2010 at the Eislaufzentrum Oberstdorf. The competition is held annually in Oberstdorf, Germany and is named after the Nebelhorn, a nearby mountain.

It is one of the first international senior competitions of the season. Skaters are entered by their respective national federations and compete in four disciplines: men's singles, ladies' singles, pair skating, and ice dance. The Fritz-Geiger-Memorial Trophy was presented to the team with the highest placements across all disciplines.

== Results ==
=== Men ===
Rank	Name	Nation	Total points	SP		FS	
1	Tatsuki Machida	Japan	221.22	1	71.41	1	149.81
2	Konstantin Menshov	Russia	208.80	3	67.93	2	140.87
3	Peter Liebers	Germany	196.97	4	64.97	4	132.00
4	Armin Mahbanoozadeh	United States	196.17	8	55.97	3	140.20
5	Kevin van der Perren	Belgium	194.14	2	69.94	8	124.20
6	Joey Russell	Canada	186.37	6	60.49	6	125.88
7	Michal Březina	Czech Republic	184.31	9	55.40	5	128.91
8	Jason Wong	United States	179.55	11	55.00	7	124.55
9	Ivan Tretiakov	Russia	178.26	5	64.30	9	113.96
10	Maciej Cieplucha	Poland	160.79	13	53.70	10	107.09
11	Maxim Shipov	Israel	157.30	12	54.55	11	102.75
12	Laurent Alvarez	Switzerland	150.30	7	56.39	13	93.91
13	Viktor Pfeifer	Austria	146.62	14	51.08	12	95.54
14	Franz Streubel	Germany	145.92	10	55.15	15	90.77
15	Matthew Parr	United Kingdom	140.12	16	46.47	14	93.65
16	Moris Pfeifhofer	Switzerland	136.49	15	46.73	16	89.76
17	Ali Demirboga	Turkey	125.23	19	41.85	17	83.38
18	Sebastian Iwasaki	Poland	124.06	17	43.40	18	80.66
19	Anton Truvé	Sweden	120.46	18	41.90	19	78.56
20	Mitchell Chapman	Australia	114.32	21	40.46	21	73.86
21	Saulius Ambrulevičius	Lithuania	112.16	23	36.75	20	75.41
22	Severin Kiefer	Austria	111.11	20	41.07	22	70.04
23	Kutay Eryoldas	Turkey	103.30	22	37.64	23	65.66

=== Ladies ===
Rank	Name	Nation	Total points	SP		FS	
1	Kiira Korpi	Finland	162.88	1	58.45	1	104.43
2	Viktoria Helgesson	Sweden	145.92	4	46.51	2	99.41
3	Melissa Bulanhagui	United States	133.72	2	51.20	5	82.52
4	Joshi Helgesson	Sweden	132.08	3	48.16	4	83.92
5	Jenna McCorkell	United Kingdom	130.45	7	41.39	3	89.06
6	Diane Szmiett	Canada	124.87	6	43.12	6	81.75
7	Francesca Rio	Italy	121.07	5	44.23	7	76.84
8	Victoria Muniz	Puerto Rico	99.87	9	38.86	12	61.01
9	Phoebe Di Tommaso	Australia	98.39	11	33.15	10	65.24
10	Karina Johnson	Denmark	95.80	12	29.26	8	66.54
11	Reyna Hamui	Mexico	94.37	14	28.89	9	65.48
12	Myriam Leuenberger	Switzerland	93.66	13	29.00	11	64.66
13	Alexandra Kunova	Slovakia	89.99	10	34.12	13	55.87
WD	Sarah Hecken	Germany		8	40.63		

=== Pairs ===
Rank	Name	Nation	Total points	SP		FS	
1	Vera Bazarova / Yuri Larionov	Russia	165.30	1	57.30	1	108.00
2	Stefania Berton / Ondřej Hotárek	Italy	155.21	2	54.20	2	101.01
3	Meagan Duhamel / Eric Radford	Canada	147.44	3	51.81	3	95.63
4	Gretchen Donlan / Andrew Speroff	United States	135.58	4	46.04	4	89.54
5	Maylin Hausch / Daniel Wende	Germany	129.03	7	41.43	5	87.60
6	Joanna Sulej / Mateusz Chruściński	Poland	126.20	5	42.95	6	83.25
7	Felicia Zhang / Taylor Toth	United States	119.35	6	42.33	7	77.02
8	Lubov Bakirova / Mikalai Kamianchuk	Belarus	99.68	8	36.14	8	63.54
9	Danielle Montalbano / Evgeni Krasnapolski	Israel	93.39	9	29.90	9	63.49

=== Ice dance ===
Rank	Name	Nation	Total points	SD		FD	
1	Nathalie Péchalat / Fabian Bourzat	France	147.18	3	56.39	1	90.79
2	Anna Cappellini / Luca Lanotte	Italy	143.28	1	59.86	4	83.42
3	Ekaterina Riazanova / Ilia Tkachenko	Russia	141.92	2	58.31	3	83.61
4	Nelli Zhiganshina / Alexander Gazsi	Germany	135.42	4	54.02	5	81.40
5	Maia Shibutani / Alex Shibutani	United States	133.00	8	46.90	2	86.10
6	Lynn Kriengkrairut / Logan Giulietti-Schmitt	United States	126.94	5	52.71	8	74.23
7	Lucie Myslivečková / Matěj Novák	Czech Republic	126.27	6	50.97	6	75.30
8	Sarah Arnold / Justin Trojek	Canada	123.92	7	49.31	7	74.61
9	Tarrah Harvey / Keith Gagnon	Canada	110.01	9	44.60	12	65.41
10	Siobhan Heekin-Canedy / Alexander Shakalov	Ukraine	109.70	11	42.19	9	67.51
11	Isabella Tobias / Deividas Stagniūnas	Lithuania	108.12	10	42.26	11	65.86
12	Louise Walden / Owen Edwards	United Kingdom	106.74	12	40.43	10	66.31
13	Brooke Elizabeth Frieling / Lionel Rumi	Israel	97.26	14	37.47	13	59.79
14	Katelyn Good / Nikolaj Sorensen	Denmark	95.86	15	36.45	14	59.41
15	Danielle O'Brien / Gregory Merriman	Australia	88.26	16	34.67	15	53.59
16	Barbora Silná / Juri Kurakin	Austria	86.92	13	39.17	16	47.75
