= 2012–13 Grand Prix of Figure Skating Final =

2012–13 Grand Prix Final
- Type: Grand Prix
- Date: December 6 – 9, 2012
- Season: 2012–13
- Location: Sochi, Russia
- Venue: Iceberg Skating Palace

Champions
- Men's singles: (Japan) Daisuke Takahashi (S) (Russia) Maxim Kovtun (J)
- Ladies' singles: (Japan) Mao Asada (S) (Russia) Elena Radionova (J)
- Pairs: (Russia) Tatiana Volosozhar / Maxim Trankov (S) (Russia) Lina Fedorova / Maxim Miroshkin (J)
- Ice dance: (United States) Meryl Davis / Charlie White (S) (Russia) Alexandra Stepanova / Ivan Bukin (J)
- Previous: 2011–12 Grand Prix Final
- Next: 2013–14 Grand Prix Final
- Previous Grand Prix: 2012 NHK Trophy

The 2012–13 Grand Prix of Figure Skating Final was an international figure skating competition in the 2012–13 season, held together with the ISU Junior Grand Prix Final. The combined event was the culmination of two international series — the 2012–13 ISU Grand Prix of Figure Skating for senior-level skaters and the 2012–13 ISU Junior Grand Prix for juniors.

The event was held at the Iceberg Skating Palace in Sochi, Russia from 6–9 December 2012. It was a test event in anticipation of the 2014 Winter Olympics in Sochi. Medals were awarded in the disciplines of men's singles, ladies' singles, pair skating, and ice dancing on the senior and junior levels.

== Medalists ==
=== Senior ===
Discipline	Gold	Silver	Bronze
Men	(Japan) Daisuke Takahashi	(Japan) Yuzuru Hanyu	(Canada) Patrick Chan
Ladies	(Japan) Mao Asada	(United States) Ashley Wagner	(Japan) Akiko Suzuki
Pairs	(Russia) Tatiana Volosozhar / Maxim Trankov	(Russia) Vera Bazarova / Yuri Larionov	(China) Pang Qing / Tong Jian
Ice dancing	(United States) Meryl Davis / Charlie White	(Canada) Tessa Virtue / Scott Moir	(France) Nathalie Péchalat / Fabian Bourzat

=== Junior ===
Discipline	Gold	Silver	Bronze
Men	(Russia) Maxim Kovtun	(United States) Joshua Farris	(Japan) Ryuju Hino
Ladies	(Russia) Elena Radionova	(United States) Hannah Miller	(Russia) Anna Pogorilaya
Pairs	(Russia) Lina Fedorova / Maxim Miroshkin	(Russia) Vasilisa Davankova / Andrei Deputat	(Russia) Maria Vigalova / Egor Zakroev
Ice dancing	(Russia) Alexandra Stepanova / Ivan Bukin	(France) Gabriella Papadakis / Guillaume Cizeron	(United States) Alexandra Aldridge / Daniel Eaton

== Qualifiers ==
=== Senior-level qualifiers ===
Skaters who reached the age of 14 by July 1, 2012 were eligible to compete at two senior 2012–13 Grand Prix events, including the 2012 Skate America, 2012 Skate Canada International, 2012 Cup of China, 2012 Cup of Russia, 2012 Trophée Eric Bompard, and 2012 NHK Trophy. They earned points at these events and the six highest ranking skaters in each discipline qualified for the senior Grand Prix Final. Yulia Lipnitskaya withdrew due to a concussion and was replaced by first alternate Christina Gao.

	Men	Ladies	Pairs	Ice dancing
1	(Canada) Patrick Chan	(United States) Ashley Wagner	(Russia) Tatiana Volosozhar / Maxim Trankov	(United States) Meryl Davis / Charlie White
2	(Japan) Yuzuru Hanyu	(Japan) Mao Asada	(Russia) Vera Bazarova / Yuri Larionov	(Canada) Tessa Virtue / Scott Moir
3	(Japan) Takahiko Kozuka	(Finland) Kiira Korpi	(China) Pang Qing / Tong Jian	(France) Nathalie Péchalat / Fabian Bourzat
4	(Japan) Tatsuki Machida	(Japan) Akiko Suzuki	(Russia) Yuko Kavaguti / Alexander Smirnov	(Russia) Ekaterina Bobrova / Dmitri Soloviev
5	(Japan) Daisuke Takahashi	(Russia) ~~Yulia Lipnitskaya~~ (withdrew)	(Canada) Meagan Duhamel / Eric Radford	(Russia) Elena Ilinykh / Nikita Katsalapov
6	(Spain) Javier Fernández	(Russia) Elizaveta Tuktamysheva	(Canada) Kirsten Moore-Towers / Dylan Moscovitch	(Italy) Anna Cappellini / Luca Lanotte
Alternates
1st	(United States) Jeremy Abbott	(United States) Christina Gao (called up)	(United States) Caydee Denney / John Coughlin	(Canada) Kaitlyn Weaver / Andrew Poje
2nd	(France) Florent Amodio	(United States) Mirai Nagasu	(Italy) Stefania Berton / Ondrej Hotarek	(Russia) Ekaterina Riazanova / Ilia Tkachenko
3rd	(Japan) Takahito Mura	(Japan) Kanako Murakami	(Russia) Ksenia Stolbova / Fedor Klimov	(United States) Maia Shibutani / Alex Shibutani

=== Junior-level qualifiers ===
Skaters who reached the age of 13 by July 1, 2012 but had not turned 19 (singles and females of the other two disciplines) or 21 (male pair skaters and ice dancers) were eligible to compete at two 2012–13 Junior Grand Prix events. They earned points at these events and the six highest-ranking skaters in each discipline qualified for the Junior Grand Prix Final.

	Men	Ladies	Pairs	Ice dancing
1	(United States) Joshua Farris	(Russia) Elena Radionova	(Canada) Margaret Purdy / Michael Marinaro	(Russia) Alexandra Stepanova / Ivan Bukin
2	(Russia) Maxim Kovtun	(United States) Angela Wang	(Russia) Lina Fedorova / Maxim Miroshkin	(United States) Alexandra Aldridge / Daniel Eaton
3	(United States) Jason Brown	(Russia) Anna Pogorilaya	(Canada) Brittany Jones / Ian Beharry	(France) Gabriella Papadakis / Guillaume Cizeron
4	(China) Boyang Jin	(Japan) Satoko Miyahara	(Russia) Maria Vigalova / Egor Zakroev	(Russia) Valeria Zenkova / Valerie Sinitsin
5	(Japan) Ryuju Hino	(United States) Hannah Miller	(Russia) Vasilisa Davankova / Andrei Deputat	(Russia) Evgenia Kosigina / Nikolai Moroshkin
6	(Japan) Keiji Tanaka	(United States) Leah Keiser	(China) Yu Xiaoyu / Jin Yang	(Russia) Anna Yanovskaya / Sergey Mozgov
Alternates
1st	(Russia) Alexander Samarin	(South Korea) Kim Hae-jin	(United States) Madeline Aaron / Max Settlage	(Germany) Shari Koch / Christian Nuchtern
2nd	(China) Han Yan	(United States) Courtney Hicks	(Germany) Annabelle Prölss / Ruben Blommaert	(Canada) Madeline Edwards / Zhao Kai Pang
3rd	(Russia) Alexander Petrov	(Japan) Miyabi Oba	(United States) Britney Simpson / Matthew Blackmer	(Canada) Andreanne Poulin / Marc-Andre Servant

== Overview ==
T = Toe loop, S = Salchow, A = Axel

=== Senior event ===
Japan's Daisuke Takahashi was first in the men's short program, followed by the reigning World and GPF champion Patrick Chan of Canada, and Yuzuru Hanyu, also of Japan. Spain's Javier Fernández, fourth overall, won the free skate with a program that included a 4T, 4S+3T, 4S, and 3A. Takahashi won the GPF title in his seventh appearance at the event, Hanyu won silver, and Chan took the bronze.

Japan's Mao Asada took the lead in the ladies' short program, with the United States' Ashley Wagner and Japan's Akiko Suzuki in second and third respectively. Asada also placed first in the free skate and won her third GPF title, Wagner injured herself in falls during the free skate but completed the program and took the silver, and Suzuki took the bronze. Russia's Elizaveta Tuktamysheva was second in the free skate but remained in 5th overall.

Russia's Tatiana Volosozhar / Maxim Trankov won the pairs' short program ahead of teammates Vera Bazarova / Yuri Larionov and China's Pang Qing / Tong Jian. Bazarova / Larionov won the free skate but Volosozhar / Trankov finished first overall and took their first GPF title, while silver medalists Bazarova / Larionov won their first medal at the event and Pang / Tong took the bronze.

The defending GPF champions, Meryl Davis / Charlie White of the United States, finished first in the short dance ahead of the reigning World champions, Tessa Virtue / Scott Moir of Canada, and Nathalie Pechalat / Fabian Bourzat of France. Davis / White also placed first in the free dance and won their fourth consecutive GPF title, Virtue / Moir won their third silver at the event, and Pechalat / Bourzat won the bronze.

=== Junior event ===
Russia swept all four gold medals at the Junior Grand Prix Final and the entire pairs' podium.

The United States' Joshua Farris won the men's short program ahead of Russia's Maxim Kovtun and the 2011 JGP Final champion Jason Brown. Kovtun won the free skate with a program that included a 4T-3T, 3A+3T, and 3A. He won the title by 11 points over the silver medalist, Farris, while Japan's Ryuju Hino moved ahead of Brown to take the bronze.

Russia's Elena Radionova was first in the ladies' short program, with the United States' Hannah Miller in second and Russia's Anna Pogorilaya in third. Radionova also placed first in the free skate and won the junior ladies' title by 11 points ahead of silver medalist Miller, who placed fourth in the segment, and bronze medalist Pogorilaya. Angela Wang of the United States was second in the free skate but remained in fourth overall.

Russia's Lina Fedorova / Maxim Miroshkin took the lead in the pairs' short program, followed by Canada's Margaret Purdy / Michael Marinaro and Russia's Vasilisa Davankova / Andrei Deputat. Fedorova / Miroshkin were also first in the free skate and won gold with a total score slightly over five points ahead of the silver medalists, Davankova / Deputat, while Maria Vigalova / Egor Zakroev rose to take the bronze, producing a Russian sweep of the podium. Davankova / Deputat were the only junior pairs' medalists to attempt (and complete) side-by-side triple jumps. Vigalova (born 29 June 1999) was the youngest skater at the JGP Final.

Russia's Alexandra Stepanova / Ivan Bukin won the short dance ahead of France's Gabriella Papadakis / Guillaume Cizeron and 2011 JGP Final silver medalists Anna Yanovskaia / Sergey Mozgov. Stepanova / Bukin also placed first in the free dance and won gold by ten points ahead of Papadakis / Cizeron, while the United States' Alexandra Aldridge / Daniel Eaton moved past Yanovskaia / Mozgov to take the bronze.

== Senior-level results ==
=== Men ===
Rank	Name	Nation	Total points	SP		FS	
1	Daisuke Takahashi	Japan	269.40	1	92.29	3	177.11
2	Yuzuru Hanyu	Japan	264.29	3	87.17	2	177.12
3	Patrick Chan	Canada	258.66	2	89.27	4	169.39
4	Javier Fernández	Spain	258.62	5	80.19	1	178.43
5	Takahiko Kozuka	Japan	253.27	4	86.39	5	166.88
6	Tatsuki Machida	Japan	198.63	6	70.58	6	128.05

=== Ladies ===
Rank	Name	Nation	Total points	SP		FS	
1	Mao Asada	Japan	196.80	1	66.96	1	129.84
2	Ashley Wagner	United States	181.93	2	66.44	4	115.49
3	Akiko Suzuki	Japan	180.77	3	65.00	3	115.77
4	Kiira Korpi	Finland	174.94	4	63.42	5	111.52
5	Elizaveta Tuktamysheva	Russia	173.75	5	56.61	2	117.14
6	Christina Gao	United States	154.54	6	48.56	6	105.98

=== Pairs ===
Rank	Name	Nation	Total points	SP		FS	
1	Tatiana Volosozhar / Maxim Trankov	Russia	204.55	1	73.46	2	131.09
2	Vera Bazarova / Yuri Larionov	Russia	201.60	2	70.14	1	131.46
3	Pang Qing / Tong Jian	China	192.81	3	64.74	3	128.07
4	Meagan Duhamel / Eric Radford	Canada	187.09	4	64.20	4	122.89
5	Kirsten Moore-Towers / Dylan Moscovitch	Canada	180.45	5	60.95	6	119.50
6	Yuko Kavaguti / Alexander Smirnov	Russia	178.72	6	58.02	5	120.70

=== Ice dancing ===
Rank	Name	Nation	Total points	SD		FD	
1	Meryl Davis / Charlie White	United States	183.39	1	73.20	1	110.19
2	Tessa Virtue / Scott Moir	Canada	179.83	2	71.27	2	108.56
3	Nathalie Péchalat / Fabian Bourzat	France	170.18	3	68.70	3	101.48
4	Anna Cappellini / Luca Lanotte	Italy	165.64	5	66.11	4	99.53
5	Ekaterina Bobrova / Dmitri Soloviev	Russia	158.09	4	66.23	6	91.86
6	Elena Ilinykh / Nikita Katsalapov	Russia	156.36	6	63.56	5	92.80

== Junior-level results ==
=== Junior men ===
Rank	Name	Nation	Total points	SP		FS	
1	Maxim Kovtun	Russia	222.31	2	72.53	1	149.78
2	Joshua Farris	United States	211.37	1	74.53	2	136.84
3	Ryuju Hino	Japan	198.92	4	67.55	3	131.37
4	Jason Brown	United States	198.32	3	69.43	4	128.89
5	Jin Boyang	China	187.95	6	60.73	5	127.22
6	Keiji Tanaka	Japan	174.55	5	61.74	6	112.81

=== Junior ladies ===
Rank	Name	Nation	Total points	SP		FS	
1	Elena Radionova	Russia	179.40	1	60.90	1	118.50
2	Hannah Miller	United States	168.41	2	59.18	4	109.23
3	Anna Pogorilaya	Russia	167.40	3	57.94	3	109.46
4	Angela Wang	United States	162.05	4	51.16	2	110.89
5	Satoko Miyahara	Japan	157.74	5	49.60	5	108.14
6	Leah Keiser	United States	137.44	6	47.23	6	90.23

=== Junior pairs ===
Rank	Name	Nation	Total points	SP		FS	
1	Lina Fedorova / Maxim Miroshkin	Russia	161.11	1	54.37	1	106.74
2	Vasilisa Davankova / Andrei Deputat	Russia	155.96	3	51.34	2	104.62
3	Maria Vigalova / Egor Zakroev	Russia	153.56	4	50.76	3	102.80
4	Margaret Purdy / Michael Marinaro	Canada	149.94	2	51.83	5	98.11
5	Xiaoyu Yu / Yang Jin	China	149.20	5	50.34	4	98.86
6	Brittany Jones / Ian Beharry	Canada	145.89	6	48.11	6	97.78

=== Junior ice dancing ===
Rank	Name	Nation	Total points	SD		FD	
1	Alexandra Stepanova / Ivan Bukin	Russia	149.57	1	61.18	1	88.39
2	Gabriella Papadakis / Guillaume Cizeron	France	139.21	2	54.79	2	84.42
3	Alexandra Aldridge / Daniel Eaton	United States	136.19	4	52.60	3	83.59
4	Anna Yanovskaia / Sergey Mozgov	Russia	129.31	3	53.03	4	76.28
5	Valeria Zenkova / Valerie Sinitsin	Russia	124.19	6	50.39	5	73.80
6	Evgenia Kosigina / Nikolai Moroshkin	Russia	120.05	5	50.45	6	69.60
