= Ryuju Hino =

Japanese figure skater

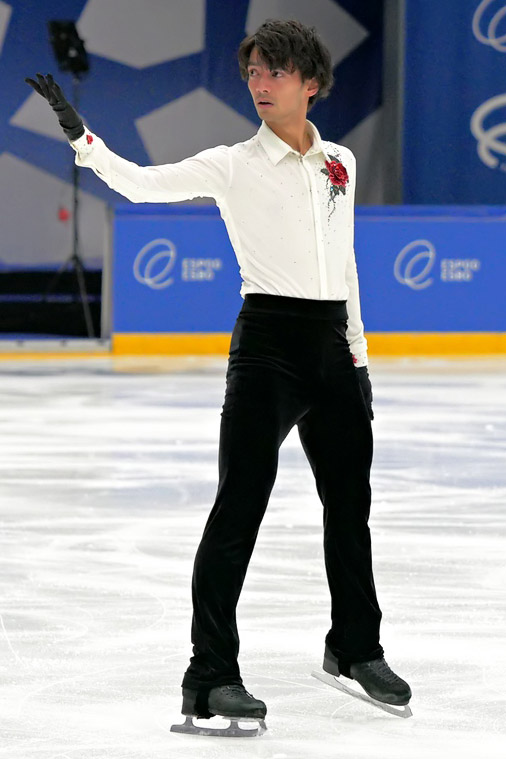
- Hino at the 2018 Finlandia Trophy

Personal information
- Born: 12 February 1995 (age 31) Tokyo, Japan
- Height: 1.73 m (5 ft 8 in)

Figure skating career
- Country: Japan
- Coach: Miho Kawaume; Yoriko Naruse
- Skating club: Chukyo University
- Began skating: 2001
- Retired: December 26, 2020
Medal record
Representing Japan
Figure skating: Men's singles
Junior Grand Prix Final
Bronze medal – third place	2012–13 Sochi	Men's singles

Ryuju Hino (日野 龍樹, Hino Ryūju; born 12 February 1995) is a Japanese former figure skater. He has won five senior international medals, seven ISU Junior Grand Prix medals – including bronze at the 2012–13 JGP Final, and two (2011, 2012) Japanese national junior titles.

== Career ==
Hino won gold and silver medals during the 2011–12 ISU Junior Grand Prix series and qualified for the JGP Final where he finished 5th. He won the Japanese Junior Championships.

During the 2012–13 ISU Junior Grand Prix season, Hino won bronze in France and silver in Austria and qualified for the 2012 JGP Final in Sochi, Russia. At the final, Hino edged out American skater Jason Brown for the bronze medal. Hino won his second junior national title at the 2012 Japanese Junior Championships.

In the 2013–14 JGP season, Hino won two silver medals at his events in Mexico and Belarus. Having qualified for his third JGP Final, he finished sixth in Fukuoka, Japan. He won his first senior international medal, bronze, at the 2014 Triglav Trophy.

He announced his retirement after the 2020–2021 season.

== Programs ==
Season	Short program	Free skating	Exhibition
2020–2021	Symphonie n° 3 ut mineur op.78, avec orgue by Camille Saint-Saëns choreo. by Kohei Yoshino	Second movement, Piano Concerto No. 1 by Philip Glass choreo. by Kohei Yoshino	
2019–2020	Symphonie n° 3 ut mineur op.78, avec orgue by Camille Saint-Saëns choreo. by Kohei Yoshino	Carmen by Georges Bizet choreo. by Kohei Yoshino	
2018–2019	Addicted to Love by Rachel Portman choreo. by Natalia Bestemianova, Igor Bobrin	La Bohème by Giacomo Puccini choreo. by Kenji Miyamoto	
2017–2018	Addicted to Love by Rachel Portman choreo. by Natalia Bestemianova, Igor Bobrin	Quidam (from Cirque du Soleil) by Benoît Jutras choreo. by Natalia Bestemianova, Igor Bobrin	Criminal
2016–2017	Artsakh by Ara Gevorgyan choreo. by Natalia Bestemianova, Igor Bobrin }	Quidam (from Cirque du Soleil) by Benoît Jutras choreo. by Natalia Bestemianova, Igor Bobrin	
2015–2016	Artsakh by Ara Gevorgyan choreo. by Natalia Bestemianova, Igor Bobrin }	King Arthur by Hans Zimmer choreo. by Kenji Miyamoto	
2014–2015	Lunatico by Gotan Project choreo. by Kenji Miyamoto	King Arthur by Hans Zimmer choreo. by Kenji Miyamoto	
2013–2014	TaTaKu (best of Kodo) by Tetsuro Naito, Motofumi Yamaguchi	Romeo and Juliet by Sergei Prokofiev	
2012–2013	TaTaKu (best of Kodo) by Tetsuro Naito, Motofumi Yamaguchi	Robin Hood: Prince of Thieves by Michael Kamen	
2011–2012	Russian Sailors' Dance by Reinhold Glière	The Matrix Revolutions by Don Davis, Ben Watkins	
2010–2011	Russian Sailors' Dance by Reinhold Glière	Don Quixote by Ludwig Minkus	
2007–2008	Sabre Dance (from Gayane) by Aram Khachaturian		

== Competitive highlights ==
GP: Grand Prix; CS: Challenger Series; JGP: Junior Grand Prix

International
Event	04–05	05–06	06–07	07–08	08–09	09–10	10–11	11–12	12–13	13–14	14–15	15–16	16–17	17–18	18–19	19–20	20–21
GP NHK Trophy													9th				
CS Finlandia												6th	11th		10th		
CS Nebelhorn											10th						
CS Ondrej Nepela														11th			
Asian Trophy														2nd			
Bavarian Open												3rd	4th				
Challenge Cup											3rd			5th			
Gardena							6th										
Merano Cup											1st						
Printemps										2nd							
Triglav Trophy										3rd							
Universiade											8th		6th				
International: Junior
Junior Worlds								9th	10th								
JGP Final								5th	3rd	6th							
JGP Austria									2nd								
JGP Belarus										2nd							
JGP France							5th		3rd								
JGP Japan							12th										
JGP Latvia								1st									
JGP Mexico										2nd							
JGP Romania								2nd									
International: Novice
Asian Trophy				1st													
Gardena				1st													
Mladost Trophy			2nd														
National
Japan Champ.						18th	13th	10th	10th	12th	9th	8th	4th	7th	14th	13th	11th
Japan Junior			10th	10th		4th	3rd	1st	1st	3rd							
Japan Novice	6th B	1st B	1st A	3rd A													
Team Events
Japan Open																	2nd T 3rd P
TBD = Assigned; T = Team result; P = Personal result. Medals awarded for team result only.
