= 2012 Skate America =

- Type: Grand Prix
- Date: October 19 – 21
- Season: 2012–13
- Location: Kent, Washington
- Host: U.S. Figure Skating
- Venue: ShoWare Center

Champions
- Men's singles: (Japan) Takahiko Kozuka
- Ladies' singles: (United States) Ashley Wagner
- Pairs: (Russia) Tatiana Volosozhar / Maxim Trankov
- Ice dance: (United States) Meryl Davis / Charlie White
- Previous: 2011 Skate America
- Next: 2013 Skate America
- Next Grand Prix: 2012 Skate Canada International

The 2012 Hilton HHonors Skate America was the first event of six in the 2012–13 ISU Grand Prix of Figure Skating, a senior-level international invitational competition series. It was held at the ShoWare Center in Kent, Washington on October 19–21. Medals were awarded in the disciplines of men's singles, ladies' singles, pair skating, and ice dancing. Skaters earned points toward qualifying for the 2012–13 Grand Prix Final.

== Eligibility ==
Skaters who reached the age of 14 before July 1, 2012, were eligible to compete on the senior Grand Prix circuit.

Prior to competing in a Grand Prix event, skaters were required to have earned the following scores (3/5 of the top scores at the 2012 World Championships):

Discipline	Minimum
Men	159.66
Ladies	113.43
Pairs	120.90
Ice dancing	109.59

== Entries ==
The entries were as follows.

Country	Men	Ladies	Pairs	Ice dancing
Canada				Kaitlyn Weaver / Andrew Poje
China			Pang Qing / Tong Jian	
Czech Republic	Michal Březina; Tomáš Verner			
France		Maé Bérénice Méité	Vanessa James / Morgan Ciprès	
Germany		Sarah Hecken		Nelli Zhiganshina / Alexander Gazsi
Israel			Danielle Montalbano / Evgeni Krasnopolski	
Italy		Valentina Marchei		Lorenza Alessandrini / Simone Vaturi
Japan	Yuzuru Hanyu; Takahiko Kozuka; Tatsuki Machida	Haruka Imai		
Russia	Konstantin Menshov	Alena Leonova; Adelina Sotnikova	Tatiana Volosozhar / Maxim Trankov	Ekaterina Bobrova / Dmitri Soloviev
Sweden	Alexander Majorov	Viktoria Helgesson		
United States	Jeremy Abbott; Armin Mahbanoozadeh; Douglas Razzano	Rachael Flatt; Christina Gao; Ashley Wagner	Marissa Castelli / Simon Shnapir; Caydee Denney / John Coughlin; Gretchen Donlan / Andrew Speroff	Anastasia Cannuscio / Colin McManus; Meryl Davis / Charlie White; Lynn Kriengkrairut / Logan Giulietti-Schmitt

== Overview ==
Yuzuru Hanyu posted a world record score in the men's short program for a ten-point lead over teammate Takahiko Kozuka, with American Jeremy Abbott in third. Kozuka won the gold medal after placing first in the free skating, Hanyu dropped to second overall, and Tatsuki Machida rounded out a Japanese sweep of the podium by winning bronze, his first Grand Prix medal.

American Ashley Wagner led after the ladies' short program, followed by Russia's Adelina Sotnikova and American Christina Gao. Wagner then placed first in the free skating to win her first GP gold, while Gao rose to take the silver, her first GP medal, and Sotnikova slipped to third.

Russia's Tatiana Volosozhar / Maxim Trankov placed first in the pairs' short program ahead of China's Pang Qing / Tong Jian and Americans Caydee Denney / John Coughlin. The pairs maintained their positions in the free skating. Volosozhar / Trankov won their third GP title, Pang / Tong finished second, and Denney / Coughlin took the bronze, their first Grand Prix medal.

Americans Meryl Davis / Charlie White won the short dance, ahead of Canada's Kaitlyn Weaver / Andrew Poje and Russia's Ekaterina Bobrova / Dmitri Soloviev. Davis / White also placed first in the free dance to win their third consecutive Skate America title, while Bobrova and Soloviev moved up to win the silver, their fifth medal on the GP series, and Weaver and Poje took the bronze, their sixth GP medal.

== Results ==
=== Men ===
Rank	Name	Nation	Total points	SP		FS	
1	Takahiko Kozuka	Japan	251.44	2	85.32	1	166.12
2	Yuzuru Hanyu	Japan	243.74	1	95.07	3	148.67
3	Tatsuki Machida	Japan	229.95	4	75.78	2	154.17
4	Konstantin Menshov	Russia	212.53	5	73.32	5	139.21
5	Jeremy Abbott	United States	211.35	3	77.71	8	133.64
6	Michal Březina	Czech Republic	209.67	6	69.26	4	140.41
7	Armin Mahbanoozadeh	United States	203.65	7	68.27	7	135.38
8	Tomáš Verner	Czech Republic	197.36	9	58.79	6	138.57
9	Douglas Razzano	United States	187.83	10	57.06	9	130.67
10	Alexander Majorov	Sweden	182.42	8	60.48	10	121.94

=== Ladies ===
Rank	Name	Nation	Total points	SP		FS	
1	Ashley Wagner	United States	188.37	1	60.61	1	127.76
2	Christina Gao	United States	174.25	3	56.63	2	117.62
3	Adelina Sotnikova	Russia	168.96	2	58.93	3	110.03
4	Valentina Marchei	Italy	158.79	5	54.01	6	104.78
5	Haruka Imai	Japan	157.72	7	49.90	4	107.82
6	Maé Bérénice Méité	France	155.95	4	54.41	7	101.54
7	Alena Leonova	Russia	153.49	9	46.72	5	106.77
8	Viktoria Helgesson	Sweden	144.85	6	50.29	8	94.56
9	Rachael Flatt	United States	136.09	10	43.72	9	92.37
10	Sarah Hecken	Germany	134.09	8	48.11	10	85.98

=== Pairs ===
Rank	Name	Nation	Total points	SP		FS	
1	Tatiana Volosozhar / Maxim Trankov	Russia	195.07	1	65.78	1	129.29
2	Pang Qing / Tong Jian	China	185.16	2	61.96	2	123.20
3	Caydee Denney / John Coughlin	United States	177.43	3	60.75	3	117.47
4	Vanessa James / Morgan Ciprès	France	167.66	4	55.76	4	111.90
5	Marissa Castelli / Simon Shnapir	United States	164.19	5	55.67	5	108.52
6	Gretchen Donlan / Andrew Speroff	United States	131.26	7	40.54	6	90.72
7	Danielle Montalbano / Evgeni Krasnopolski	Israel	119.02	6	40.66	7	78.36

=== Ice dancing ===
Rank	Name	Nation	Total points	SD		FD	
1	Meryl Davis / Charlie White	United States	176.28	1	71.39	1	104.89
2	Ekaterina Bobrova / Dmitri Soloviev	Russia	159.95	3	62.91	2	97.04
3	Kaitlyn Weaver / Andrew Poje	Canada	157.32	2	65.79	3	91.53
4	Lynn Kriengkrairut / Logan Giulietti-Schmitt	United States	141.41	4	53.89	4	87.52
5	Nelli Zhiganshina / Alexander Gazsi	Germany	132.57	5	52.30	5	80.27
6	Lorenza Alessandrini / Simone Vaturi	Italy	125.74	6	50.36	6	75.38
7	Anastasia Cannuscio / Colin McManus	United States	122.37	7	47.98	7	74.39
