= Ekaterina Bobrova =

Russian ice dancer (born 1990)

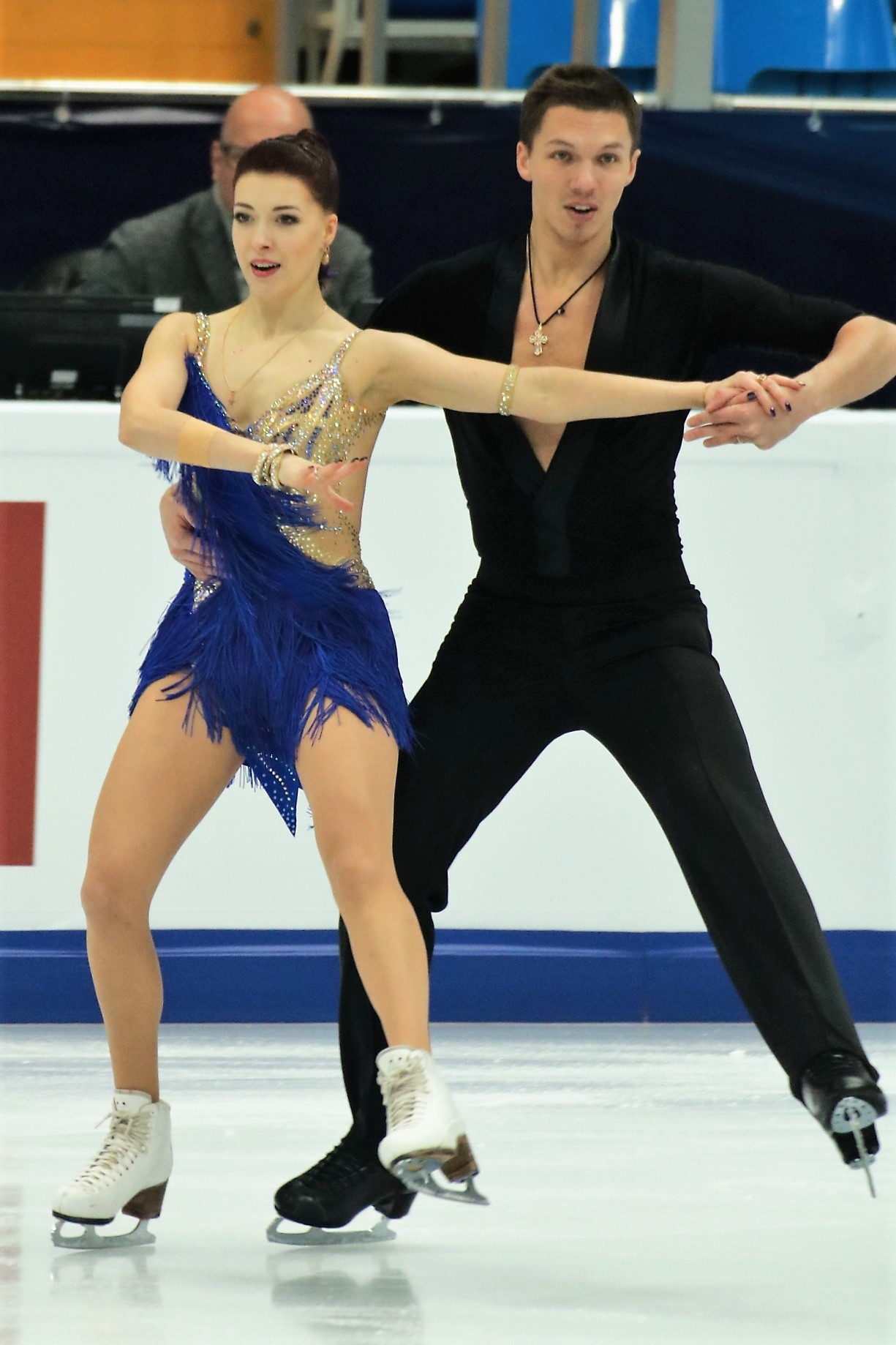
- Bobrova with Soloviev at the 2018 European Championships

Personal information
- Full name: Ekaterina Alexandrovna Bobrova
- Born: 28 March 1990 (age 36) Moscow, Russian SFSR, Soviet Union
- Height: 1.66 m (5 ft 5 in)

Figure skating career
- Country: Russia
- Partner: Dmitri Soloviev
- Coach: Alexander Zhulin, Oleg Volkov
- Skating club: Moskvich
- Began skating: 1994
- Retired: 8 July 2019
Medal record
Figure skating: Ice dancing
Representing Olympic Athletes from Russia
Olympic Games
Silver medal – second place	2018 Pyeongchang	Team
Representing Russia
Olympic Games
Gold medal – first place	2014 Sochi	Team
World Championships
Bronze medal – third place	2013 London	Ice dancing
World Team Trophy
Silver medal – second place	2017 Tokyo	Team
World Junior Championships
Gold medal – first place	2007 Oberstdorf	Ice dancing
Junior Grand Prix Final
Bronze medal – third place	2006–07 Sofia	Ice dancing

Ekaterina Alexandrovna Bobrova (Russian: Екатерина Александровна Боброва; born 28 March 1990) is a Russian retired ice dancer. With partner Dmitri Soloviev, she is the 2014 Olympic champion in the team event, the 2013 World bronze medalist, the 2013 European champion, the 2007 World Junior champion, and a seven-time (2011–2014, 2016–2018) Russian national champion. They are also gold medalists at four Grand Prix events.

== Personal life ==
Ekaterina Alexandrovna Bobrova was born 28 March 1990 in Moscow. She married her fiancé, pair skater Andrei Deputat, on 16 July 2016 in Moscow. On 13 April 2019 she gave birth to her son Alexandr.

== Career ==
=== Early career ===
Bobrova teamed up with Soloviev in 2000. Elena Kustarova and Svetlana Alexeeva were their coaches from the beginning of their partnership. At the 2007 World Junior Championships, Bobrova/Soloviev placed first in the compulsory dance, original dance, and free dance, and won the gold medal.

=== 2007–08 to 2011–12 ===
Bobrova/Soloviev competed at their first senior Worlds in 2008, where they placed 13th. The following season they were not selected for the event.

During the 2009–10 season, Bobrova/Soloviev won the silver medal at 2010 Russian Nationals in December 2009, earning them their first berth to the European Championships in January 2010, where they placed 9th. They also qualified for the Olympics the following month where they finished in 15th. They also competed at their second World Championships and climbed to 8th in the rankings.

During the 2010–11 season, Bobrova/Soloviev won their first medal on the senior Grand Prix series – a silver at Cup of China. At their next event, 2010 Cup of Russia, they won their first senior Grand Prix title. In doing so, they qualified for their first senior Grand Prix Final, where they finished fourth.

At the 2011 Russian Championships, Bobrova/Soloviev finished first in both the short dance and the free dance to win their first national title. Following the event, they decided to drop their Delilah short dance in favor of a new one to Where I Want to Be which they debuted at the 2011 European Championships. They won their first medal at the event, silver. At the 2011 World Championships, they came in 6th.

In 2011–12, Bobrova/Soloviev won the gold medal at their first Grand Prix event of the season, 2011 Cup of China, with a score of 163.52 after placing first in both the short dance and in the free dance. They took the bronze medal at their next event, 2011 Cup of Russia, and then finished sixth at the Grand Prix Final. They repeated as Russian national champions and European silver medalists. Bobrova/Soloviev finished 7th at the 2012 World Championships.

=== 2012–13 season ===
On 25 April 2012, Bobrova/Soloviev changed coaches to Alexander Zhulin and Oleg Volkov. They said they were learning a different technique, as well as changing their style. In their 2012–13 free dance, Soloviev plays the insane lover of Bobrova who herself begins to slip into insanity as he starts to recover. On the short dance, Soloviev said: "The story is that we are at a ball. In the beginning, we meet and have a dance together. The first part, the polka, is very playful, but when the music changes into the waltz, that's when we fall in love with each other and it's getting more serious. In the end, we realize that we can't be together because I'm too old and she is a young girl."

Bobrova/Soloviev started the 2012–13 season with gold at the 2012 Finlandia Trophy. Winning silver at both of their Grand Prix assignments, the 2012 Skate America and 2012 Cup of China, they qualified for the 2012 Grand Prix Final in Sochi, Russia. After a fall from Soloviev in their free dance, they finished 5th overall behind Italian ice dancers Anna Cappellini / Luca Lanotte. At the 2013 Russian Championships, they won their third national title.

Bobrova/Soloviev won the gold medal in their fourth appearance at the European Championships, narrowly edging out their teammates Elena Ilinykh / Nikita Katsalapov. They stepped onto the World podium for the first time at the 2013 World Championships in London, Ontario where they won the bronze medal. Named in the Russian team to the 2013 World Team Trophy, they withdrew after Soloviev aggravated a groin injury on 1 April and was told to rest for at least ten days. During this time, Bobrova decided to assist Volkov in coaching young ice dancers.

=== 2013–14 season ===
Competing on the 2013–14 ISU Grand Prix series, Bobrova/Soloviev won silver at the 2013 Cup of China and gold at the 2013 Rostelecom Cup before finishing fourth at the 2013 Grand Prix Final, behind Nathalie Pechalat / Fabian Bourzat. They won their fourth consecutive national title at the 2014 Russian Championships. Feeling their free dance was not working, they decided to return to the one from the previous season.

In February 2014, Bobrova/Soloviev competed at the Winter Olympics in Sochi. In the team event, they placed third in their assigned segment, the short dance, and Russia went on to win the gold medal. Bobrova decided to sell the car she was awarded and donate the money to a children's charity. Bobrova/Soloviev ranked fifth in the separate ice dancing event. A month later, they traveled to Saitama, Japan for the 2014 World Championships. On 28 March, Soloviev sustained a groin injury during the morning practice before the short dance, causing them to withdraw. He returned to the ice cautiously in the second week of April.

=== 2014–15 season ===
For the 2014–15 Grand Prix season, Bobrova/Soloviev were assigned to the 2014 Skate America and 2014 Trophee Eric Bompard. As a result of Soloviev's knee surgery, they withdrew from both events and decided to sit out the remainder of the season to allow him to recover fully.

=== 2015–16 season ===
During the 2015–16 Grand Prix series, Bobrova/Soloviev won the bronze medal at the 2015 Skate Canada International and then silver at the 2015 NHK Trophy. These placements gave them the last spot at the final, ahead of compatriots Victoria Sinitsina / Nikita Katsalapov. They finished 5th at the 2015–16 Grand Prix Final in Barcelona, Spain. In late December, Bobrova/Soloviev were awarded their fifth national title at the 2016 Russian Championships held in Yekaterinburg.

On 27–30 January, Bobrova/Soloviev won the bronze medal at the 2016 European Championships with a personal best overall score of 176.50 points. On 7 March 2016, Bobrova announced that she had tested positive for meldonium. Expressing "shock" about the test result, she stated that she had been aware of meldonium's addition to the banned list (on 1 January 2016) and had been careful to avoid products containing banned substances. On 13 April, the World Anti-Doping Agency gave amnesty to athletes with the presence of less than one microgram of meldonium in doping samples in tests conducted on athletes before 1 March 2016 due to uncertainties and lack of studies on how long it stays in the body. Bobrova's suspension was subsequently lifted by the ISU, which stated it had decided "to stay the results management process and consequently not to disqualify any results at the present stage."

=== 2016–17 season ===
Bobrova/Soloviev started their season by winning the gold medal at the 2016 CS Ondrej Nepela Memorial. Competing on the Grand Prix series, they won two medals, first the bronze medal at the 2016 Skate America and then the gold medal at the 2017 Rostelecom Cup. These results qualified them to the 2016–17 Grand Prix Final where they placed 4th after placing 5th in the short dance and 4th in the free dance.

In December 2016 they won the gold medal at the 2017 Russian Championships. A month later they won the bronze medal at the 2017 European Championships after winning the short dance and placing 3rd in the free dance. They later competed at the 2017 World Championships where they placed 5th and at the 2017 World Team Trophy where their team won the silver medal.

=== 2017–18 season ===
This was expected to be her last Olympic season. Again Bobrova/Soloviev started their season by winning the gold medal at the CS Ondrej Nepela Trophy. This was their 2nd consecutive victory at the Ondrej Nepela Trophy. Competing on the Grand Prix series, they won two medals, first the silver medal at the 2017 Rostelecom Cup and then the bronze medal at the 2017 Cup of China.

In December 2017 they first won the gold medal the 2017 CS Golden Spin of Zagreb and then they won another gold medal at the 2018 Russian Championships. This was the 7th time that they had won the gold medal at the Russian Championships. A month later they won the silver medal at the 2018 European Championships after placing 4th in the short dance and 2nd in the free dance. At the 2018 Europeans they scored their personal best score of 187.13 points.

In February 2018 Bobrova/Soloviev placed 5th at the 2018 Winter Olympics after placing 6th in the short dance and 4th in the free dance. A week earlier they had won the olympic silver medal at the team event of the 2018 Winter Olympics. They later withdrew from the 2018 World Championships.

=== After 2018 ===
In July 2019, Bobrova stated that she was completing her competition career in her Instagram. In an interview held on 26 December 2019, Bobrova confirmed that she had retired from competition.

== Programs ==
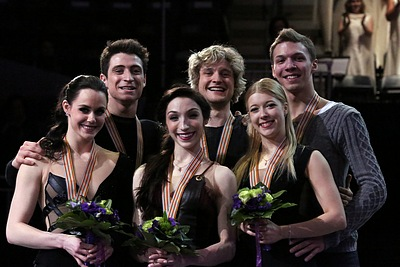
Bobrova/Soloviev at the 2013 World Championships podium.

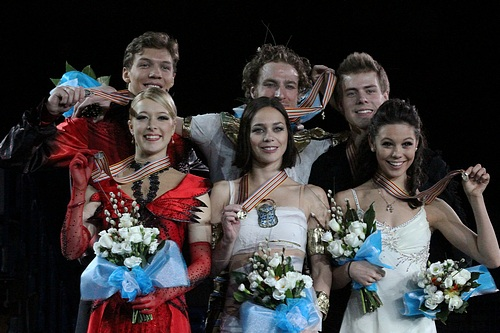
The podium at the 2012 Europeans

(with Soloviev)

Season	Short dance	Free dance	Exhibition
2017–2018	Rhumba: Latin Lover by João Bosco; Samba: Dance by DJ Maksy; Samba: Quand je vois tes yeux by Dany Brillant	Oblivion by Astor Piazzolla performed by 2Cellos; Beethoven's Five Secrets by The Piano Guys	La La Land; Stop! by Sam Brown
2016–2017	Blues: Mercy on Me by Christina Aguilera; Swing: Sing Sing Sing by Louis Prima	Prelude No. 20 by Frédéric Chopin; The Four Seasons by Nigel Kennedy	Cherry Pink (and Apple Blossom White) performed by Pérez Prado; They Beat Us, But We Fly by Alla Pugacheva; The Pink Panther by Henry Mancini
2015–2016	Waltz: Masquerade Waltz by Aram Khachaturian; March: Montagues and Capulets from Romeo and Juliet by Sergei Prokofiev choreo. by Sergei Petukhov	Anna Karenina by Dario Marianelli choreo. by Sergei Petukhov	Blue Canary by Slava Polunin
2014–2015	Paso Doble: Carmen's Entrance and Habanera from Carmen Suite by Rodion Shchedrin; Habanera: Allegretto quasi Andantino (Act I) from Carmen by Georges Bizet choreo. by Sergei Petukhov	Anna Karenina by Dario Marianelli choreo. by Sergei Petukhov	
2013–2014	Quickstep: Diamonds Are a Girl's Best Friend by Jule Styne; Slow Foxtrot: I Will Wait For You by Michel Legrand; Quickstep: Swing, Swing, Swing My Baby	Man with a Harmonica (from Once Upon a Time in the West) by Ennio Morricone remix by Apollo 440; Tosca by Giacomo Puccini (new arrangement); The Four Seasons by Antonio Vivaldi; Lacrimosa by Wolfgang Amadeus Mozart	Talullah; Cosmic Girl by Jamiroquai
2012–2013	Polka: Say a Word About the Poor Hussar (Russian: О бедном гусаре замолвите слово) by Andrei Petrov; Waltz: Air Crew by Alfred Schnittke	Man with a Harmonica (from Once Upon a Time in the West) by Ennio Morricone remix by Apollo 440; Tosca by Giacomo Puccini (new arrangement)	Feeling Good by Nina Simone; Talullah; Cosmic Girl by Jamiroquai
2011–2012	Samba Vocalizado by Luciano Perrone; Eres Todo En Mi by Ana Gabriel; Ooh la la by Chicadee	Walpurgis Night (from Faust) by Charles Gounod	Dicitencello Vuie by R. Falvo
2010–2011	Where I Want to Be (from Chess); Delilah by Tom Jones	Melodies of the White Night Russian: Мелодии белой ночи) by Isaac Schwartz	Dicitencello Vuie by R. Falvo
	Original dance		
2009–2010	Yablochko (Russian Sailor Dance) from "The Red Poppy" by Reinhold Glière	Adagio in G minor by Remo Giazotto performed by Il Divo	Kalinka
2008–2009	Mack the Knife by Kurt Weill	Romeo and Juliet by Nino Rota	
2007–2008	Kalinka	Suite in D Dur; Toccata and Fugue by Johann Sebastian Bach (both modern arrangements)	
2006–2007	La Passion (Tango)	Artsakh (from Armenian Rhapsody) by Ara Gevorgyan	
2005–2006	Rhumba; Samba	Carmina Burana by Carl Orff	

== Competitive highlights ==
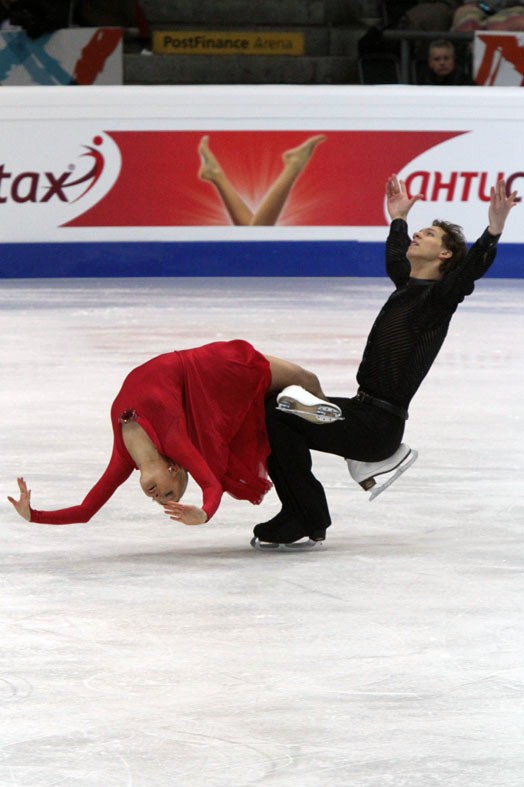
Bobrova and Soloviev perform their free dance at the 2011 Europeans

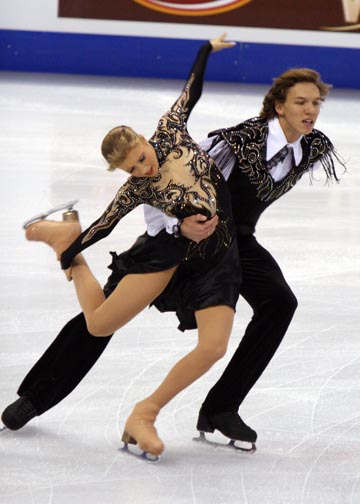
Bobrova and Soloviev at 2008 Skate Canada

(with Soloviev)

International
Event	05–06	06–07	07–08	08–09	09–10	10–11	11–12	12–13	13–14	14–15	15–16	16–17	17–18
Olympics					15th				5th				5th
Worlds			13th		8th	6th	7th	3rd	WD			5th	WD
Europeans					9th	2nd	2nd	1st			3rd	3rd	2nd
GP Final						4th	6th	5th	4th		5th	4th	
GP Cup of China						2nd	1st	2nd	2nd				3rd
GP Bompard										WD			
GP NHK Trophy				4th	4th						2nd		
GP Rostelecom			4th			1st	3rd		1st			1st	2nd
GP Skate America								2nd		WD		3rd	
GP Skate Canada			5th	6th	4th						3rd		
CS Golden Spin													1st
CS Nepela Trophy												1st	1st
CS Warsaw Cup												1st	
Finlandia								1st					
Ice Star									1st				
Shanghai Trophy													1st
Universiade				5th									
International: Junior
Event	05–06	06–07	07–08	08–09	09–10	10–11	11–12	12–13	13–14	14–15	15–16	16–17	17–18
Junior Worlds		1st											
JGP Final	7th	3rd											
JGP Canada	2nd												
JGP France		1st											
JGP Hungary		1st											
JGP Poland	2nd												
National
Russian Champ.			3rd	4th	2nd	1st	1st	1st	1st		1st	1st	1st
Russian Junior	8th	1st											
Team events
Olympics									1st T				2nd T
World Team Trophy								WD				2nd T 3rd P	

== Detailed results ==
Small medals for short and free programs awarded only at ISU Championships. At team events, medals awarded for team results only.

2017–18 season
Date	Event	SD	FD	Total
14–25 February 2018	2018 Winter Olympics	6; 75.47	4; 111.45	5; 186.92
9–12 February 2018	2018 Winter Olympics (Team event)	3; 74.76	3; 110.43	2
15–21 January 2018	2018 European Championships	4; 74.43	2; 112.70	2; 187.13
21–24 December 2017	2018 Russian Championships	1; 77.55	1; 115.53	1; 193.08
6–9 December 2017	2017 CS Golden Spin of Zagreb	1; 75.50	1; 111.16	1; 186.66
24–26 November 2017	2017 Shanghai Trophy	–	1; 113.10	1; 113.10
3–5 November 2017	2017 Cup of China	3; 72.34	3; 110.50	3; 182.84
20–22 October 2017	2017 Rostelecom Cup	2; 76.33	2; 108.41	2; 184.74
21–23 September 2017	2017 CS Ondrej Nepela Trophy	1; 71.08	1; 110.84	1; 181.92
2016–17 season
Date	Event	SD	FD	Total
20–23 April 2017	2017 World Team Trophy	3; 68.94	3; 104.55	2T/3P; 173.49
29 March – 2 April 2017	2017 World Championships	8; 73.54	3; 110.52	5; 184.06
25–29 January 2017	2017 European Championships	1; 76.18	3; 110.38	3; 186.56
22–25 December 2016	2017 Russian Championships	1; 81.40	1; 115.86	1; 197.26
8–11 December 2016	2016–17 Grand Prix Final	4; 74.04	5; 107.91	4; 181.95
17–20 November 2016	2016 CS Warsaw Cup	1; 72.98	1; 110.62	1; 183.60
4–6 November 2016	2016 Rostelecom Cup	2; 74.92	1; 111.76	1; 186.68
21–23 October 2016	2016 Skate America	2; 68.92	3; 105.85	3; 174.77
30 September – 2 October 2016	2016 CS Ondrej Nepela Memorial	2; 71.04	1; 107.80	1; 178.84
2015–16 season
Date	Event	SD	FD	Total
26–31 January 2016	2016 European Championships	3; 68.71	2; 107.79	3; 176.50
24–27 December 2015	2016 Russian Championships	2; 70.21	1; 106.77	1; 176.98
10–13 December 2015	2015–16 Grand Prix Final	6; 65.43	5; 101.30	5; 166.73
27–29 November 2015	2015 NHK Trophy	3; 66.19	2; 103.14	2; 169.33
30 October–1 November 2015	2015 Skate Canada International	3; 64.38	3; 96.73	3; 161.11
2013–14 season
Date	Event	SD	FD	Total
16–17 February 2014	2014 Winter Olympics	5; 69.97	6; 102.95	5; 172.92
6–9 February 2014	2014 Winter Olympics (team event)	3; 70.27		1
24–27 December 2013	2014 Russian Championships	1; 73.27	1; 106.63	1; 179.90
5–8 December 2013	2013–14 Grand Prix Final	3; 68.90	4; 97.82	4; 166.72
21–23 November 2013	2013 Rostelecom Cup	1; 68.42	2; 99.90	1; 168.32
1–2 November 2013	2013 Cup of China	1; 65.70	2; 97.72	2; 163.42
2012–13 season
Date	Event	SD	FD	Total
13–15 March 2013	2013 World Championships	3; 70.05	4; 99.14	3; 169.19
23–27 January 2013	2013 European Championships	1; 69.42	2; 99.83	1; 169.25
25–28 December 2012	2013 Russian Championships	1; 68.05	1; 106.67	1; 174.72
6–9 December 2012	2012–13 Grand Prix Final	4; 66.23	6; 91.86	5; 158.09
2–4 November 2012	2012 ISU Grand Prix Cup of China	3; 64.32	2; 95.14	2; 159.46
19–20 October 2012	2012 Skate America	3; 62.91	2; 97.04	2; 159.95
2011–12 season
Date	Event	SD	FD	Total
26 March – 1 April 2012	2012 World Championships	9; 58.29	7; 92.46	7; 150.75
23–29 January 2012	2012 Europeans Championships	1; 65.06	2; 95.17	2; 160.23
25–29 December 2011	2012 Russian Championships	1; 70.23	1; 101.24	1; 171.47
8–11 December 2011	2011–12 Grand Prix Final	6; 64.05	6; 93.25	6; 157.30
25–27 November 2011	2011 Rostelecom Cup	3; 61.69	3; 95.14	3; 156.83
4–6 November 2011	2011 Cup of China	1; 65.73	1; 97.79	1; 163.52
2010–11 season
Date	Event	SD	FD	Total
25 April – 1 May 2011	2011 World Championships	5; 65.88	5; 94.35	6; 160.23
24–30 January 2011	2011 European Championships	2; 65.46	2; 95.68	2; 161.14
26–29 December 2010	2011 Russian Championships	1; 65.34	1; 99.59	1; 164.93
9–12 December 2010	2010–11 Grand Prix Final	6; 54.33	4; 82.42	4; 136.75
19–22 November 2010	2010 Rostelecom Cup	1; 60.80	1; 93.53	1; 154.33
4–7 November 2010	2010 Cup of China	3; 55.85	2; 89.54	2; 145.39
