= Andrew Speroff =

American former pair skater (born 1988)

Personal information
- Born: May 19, 1988 (age 38) Newark, New Jersey, U.S.
- Home town: Newton, Massachusetts, U.S.
- Height: 5 ft 10 in (1.78 m)

Figure skating career
- Country: United States
- Partner: Kylie Duarte
- Coach: Bobby Martin
- Skating club: Boston SC
- Began skating: 1996

Andrew Speroff (born May 19, 1988) is an American former pair skater. With partner Gretchen Donlan, he is the 2013 Ondrej Nepela Trophy champion, 2013 Ice Challenge champion, and 2012 U.S. national pewter medalist.

== Personal life ==
Born in New Jersey, Speroff was raised in Cleveland until age ten when his family moved to Colorado Springs, Colorado. He moved to Boston in 2009 to train with Donlan. He has a college degree in sports management. He married pair skater Kylie Duarte on October 8, 2018.

== Career ==
Speroff began skating when he was eight. At age thirteen, he began training in the pairs discipline with Rachael Flatt, who would be his partner for over three years. In 2001, Speroff had stress fractures in his lower back. The pair won the 2004 U.S. national title on the intermediate level before parting ways. Speroff had nerve damage in his shoulder in 2004. He later skated with Ariel Avant, Amanda Luchau, and Brittany Chase.

Speroff and Gretchen Donlan were paired together in spring 2009 by coach Bobby Martin. The pair made their international debut at the 2010 Nebelhorn Trophy where they finished 4th. They were 8th at the 2011 U.S. Championships.

Donlan/Speroff won the pewter medal at the 2012 U.S. Championships. The next season, they received a Grand Prix assignment, the 2012 Skate America, and finished 6th. The pair took the silver medal at the 2012 Ice Challenge.

In the 2013–14 season, Donlan/Speroff won gold medals at two international events, the 2013 Ondrej Nepela Trophy and 2013 Ice Challenge.

Speroff retired from competition in 2014. He then began skating on cruise ships in partnership with Kylie Duarte.

== Programs ==
(with Donlan)

Season	Short program	Free skating	Exhibition
2013–2014	Méditation (from Thaïs) by Jules Massenet	Pas de Deux (from The Nutcracker) by Pyotr I. Tchaikovsky	
2012–2013	Nocturne (from La califfa) by Ennio Morricone	The Sleeping Beauty by Pyotr I. Tchaikovsky	
2011–2012	O mio babbino caro (from Gianni Schicchi) by Giacomo Puccini	The Sleeping Beauty by Pyotr I. Tchaikovsky	Time to Say Goodbye by Sarah Brightman, Andrea Bocelli
2009–2011	Moonlight Sonata by Ludwig van Beethoven	Stairway to Heaven by Led Zeppelin performed by the Boston Philharmonic Orchestra	Time to Say Goodbye by Sarah Brightman, Andrea Bocelli; Bohemian Rhapsody by Queen

== Competitive highlights ==
GP: Grand Prix

=== With Donlan ===
International
Event	09–10	10–11	11–12	12–13	13–14
GP Skate America				6th	
Ice Challenge				2nd	1st
Nebelhorn Trophy		4th		4th	
Ondrej Nepela					1st
National
U.S. Championships	8th J	8th	4th	6th	8th
J = Junior level

=== With Chase ===
International : Junior
Event	08–09
JGP Belarus	9th
JGP Mexico	7th
National
U.S. Championships	6th J
J = Junior
