= Armin Mahbanoozadeh =

Iranian American figure skater (born 1991)

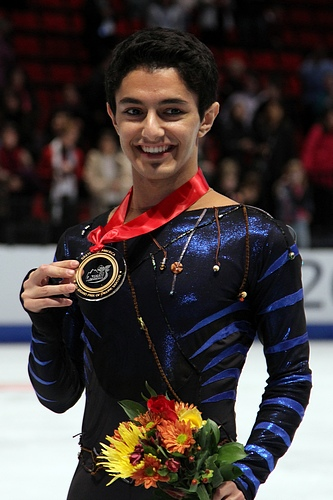
- Mahbanoozadeh at 2010 Skate America

Personal information
- Born: August 15, 1991 (age 35) Alexandria, Virginia, U.S.
- Home town: Great Falls, Virginia, U.S.
- Height: 5 ft 7 in (1.70 m)

Figure skating career
- Country: United States
- Skating club: Washington FSC
- Began skating: 1997
- Retired: June 4, 2013

Armin Mahbanoozadeh (born August 15, 1991) is an Iranian American former competitive figure skater. He is the 2010 Skate America bronze medalist and the 2012 U.S. national pewter medalist. He is also a two-time ISU Junior Grand Prix Final medalist (2008 silver, 2007 bronze) and the 2007 U.S. novice champion.

== Personal life ==
Armin Mahbanoozadeh was born on August 15, 1991, in Alexandria, Virginia. He is a classically trained pianist. His surname means "born from a lady as beautiful as the moon" in Persian. Mahbanoozadeh graduated from Langley High School in 2009 and was accepted to Dartmouth College but ultimately gave up his spot due to his training. He studied at the University of Pennsylvania until his move to Colorado Springs, Colorado. In June 2013, he was re-accepted into Dartmouth.

== Career ==
Mahbanoozadeh won the bronze at the 2007–08 Junior Grand Prix Final and silver at the 2008–09 Final.

Mahbanoozadeh made his senior Grand Prix debut during the 2007–08 season. He finished 9th at 2009 Skate Canada and 11th at 2009 Cup of China. At his first senior U.S. Nationals, he finished 8th.

During the 2010–11 season, Mahbanoozadeh placed 4th at 2010 Nebelhorn Trophy and received one Grand Prix assignment, 2010 Skate America where he won his first medal on the senior circuit. He was fourth after the short program and moved up to claim the bronze, edging out Adam Rippon.

For the 2011–12 season, Mahbanoozadeh began attempting a quad toe loop in competition. He was assigned to Grand Prix events 2011 Skate America and 2011 NHK Trophy, placing 10th and 8th respectively. In December 2011, he moved to Colorado Springs, Colorado, to be coached by Christy Krall, Eddie Shipstad, Catarina Lindgren, and Kathy Casey. Mahbanoozadeh finished 4th at the 2012 U.S. Championships and was awarded the pewter medal. He was named as the second alternate for the 2012 Four Continents behind 13th-place finisher Richard Dornbush, and as a result was not selected when Jeremy Abbott withdrew.

Mahbanoozadeh won the silver medal at the 2012 U.S. International Classic. He replaced the injured Evan Lysacek at the 2012 Skate America.

On June 4, 2013, Mahbanoozadeh said he would not compete the following season.

== Programs ==
Season	Short program	Free skating
2012–2013	Kashmir by Led Zeppelin	Doctor Who by Murray Gold
2011–2012	Kashmir by Led Zeppelin	Kill Bill
2010–2011	Mario Takes A Walk; Prelude by Jesse Cook	Avatar by James Horner
2009–2010	Virtuoso by Edvin Marton	Piano Concerto No. 3 by Sergei Rachmaninoff performed by the Royal Concertgebouw Orchestra
2008–2009	Dark Forest by Ara Gevorgyan	The Mummy by Jerry Goldsmith
2007–2008	Symphonic Dances by Sergei Rachmaninoff	Spartacus by Aram Khachaturian
2006–2007	Beetlejuice by Danny Elfman	Symphony No. 5 by Pyotr Tchaikovsky
2005–2006	Beetlejuice by Danny Elfman	Egmont Overture by Ludwig van Beethoven

== Competitive highlights ==
=== 2007–2013 ===
International
Event	2007–08	2008–09	2009–10	2010–11	2011–12	2012–13
Four Continents				7th		
GP Cup of China			11th			
GP NHK Trophy					8th	
GP Skate America				3rd	10th	7th
GP Skate Canada			9th			
Ice Challenge						3rd
Nebelhorn				4th		
U.S. Classic						2nd
International: Junior
Junior Worlds			10th			
JGP Final	3rd	2nd				
JGP Croatia	3rd					
JGP France		2nd				
JGP Spain		1st				
JGP USA	1st					
National
U.S. Champ.	8th J.	6th J.	8th	6th	4th	13th
