= Gretchen Donlan =

American pair skater

Personal information
- Born: November 18, 1993 (age 32) Boston, Massachusetts, U.S.
- Home town: Hingham, Massachusetts, U.S.
- Height: 4 ft 11 in (1.50 m)

Figure skating career
- Country: United States
- Partner: Nathan Bartholomay
- Coach: Bobby Martin
- Skating club: Boston SC
- Began skating: 1999

Gretchen Donlan (born November 18, 1993) is an American former pair skater. With partner Andrew Speroff, she is the 2013 Ondrej Nepela Trophy champion, 2013 Ice Challenge champion, and 2012 U.S. national pewter medalist. In July 2014, Donlan teamed up with Nathan Bartholomay.

== Career ==
=== Early years ===
Donlan was coached by Mark Mitchell and Peter Johansson from the fourth grade. Until 2009, she competed in singles and won the U.S. national title on the intermediate level in 2007.

=== Partnership with Speroff ===
Donlan and Andrew Speroff were paired together in spring 2009 by coach Bobby Martin. She had two stress fractures in her back for two seasons. The pair made their international debut at the 2010 Nebelhorn Trophy where they finished 4th. They were 8th at the 2011 U.S. Championships.

Donlan/Speroff won the pewter medal at the 2012 U.S. Championships. The next season, they received a Grand Prix assignment, the 2012 Skate America, and finished 6th. The pair took the silver medal at the 2012 Ice Challenge.

In the 2013–14 season, Donlan/Speroff won gold medals at two international events, the 2013 Ondrej Nepela Trophy and 2013 Ice Challenge.

=== Partnership with Bartholomay ===
In July 2014, Donlan teamed up with Nathan Bartholomay. In late October, he underwent surgery to repair a disc and remove bone spurs in his ankle, causing the pair to withdraw from their first assignment, the 2014 CS Ice Challenge. They placed seventh at the 2015 U.S. Championships and concluded their first season with gold at the International Challenge Cup.

In the 2015–16 season, Donlan/Bartholomay appeared at two Challenger Series events, placing fifth at the 2015 U.S. Classic and sixth at the Ondrej Nepela Trophy. They withdrew from their Grand Prix assignment, the 2015 Skate America, after Donlan fell ill with a severe flu. She developed labyrinthitis in her right ear, resulting in vertigo that kept her off the ice for three months and forced the pair to withdraw from the 2016 U.S. Championships. The pair announced the end of their partnership in March 2016. They were coached by Jim Peterson in Ellenton, Florida.

== Personal life ==
Donlan began attending Boston University in autumn 2012. She is a premed student majoring in chemistry.

== Programs ==
=== With Bartholomay ===
Season	Short program	Free skating
2015–2016	All That Jazz by John Kander and Fred Ebb	Medley by Frank Sinatra
2014–2015	Dear Father by Neil Diamond	Clair de lune by Claude Debussy

=== With Speroff ===
Season	Short program	Free skating	Exhibition
2013–2014	Méditation (from Thaïs) by Jules Massenet	Pas de Deux (from The Nutcracker) by Pyotr I. Tchaikovsky	
2012–2013	Nocturne (from Lady Caliph) by Ennio Morricone	The Sleeping Beauty by Pyotr I. Tchaikovsky	
2011–2012	O mio babbino caro (from Gianni Schicchi) by Giacomo Puccini	The Sleeping Beauty by Pyotr I. Tchaikovsky	Time to Say Goodbye by Sarah Brightman, Andrea Bocelli
2009–2011	Moonlight Sonata by Ludwig van Beethoven	Stairway to Heaven by Led Zeppelin performed by the Boston Philharmonic Orchestra	Time to Say Goodbye by Sarah Brightman, Andrea Bocelli; Bohemian Rhapsody by Queen

== Competitive highlights ==
GP: Grand Prix; CS: Challenger Series

=== Pairs career with Bartholomay ===
International
Event	14–15	15–16
CS Ondrej Nepela Trophy		6th
CS U.S. Classic		5th
International Challenge Cup	1st	
National
U.S. Championships	7th	WD
WD = Withdrew

=== Pairs career with Speroff ===
International
Event	09–10	10–11	11–12	12–13	13–14
GP Skate America				6th	
Ice Challenge				2nd	1st
Nebelhorn Trophy		4th		4th	
Ondrej Nepela					1st
National
U.S. Championships	8th J	8th	4th	6th	8th
J = Junior level

=== Singles career ===
National
Event	08–09
U.S. Championships	11th J
