= Fabian Bourzat =

French ice dancer (born 1980)

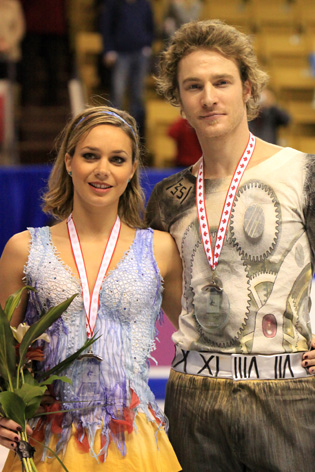
- Péchalat and Bourzat at 2009 Skate Canada

Personal information
- Born: 19 December 1980 (age 45) Nantes, France
- Height: 1.82 m (6 ft 0 in)

Figure skating career
- Country: France
- Partner: Nathalie Péchalat
- Began skating: 1988
- Retired: 2014
Event	Gold medal – first place	Silver medal – second place	Bronze medal – third place
World Championships	0	0	2
European Championships	2	0	0
Grand Prix Final	0	1	4
French Championships	5	3	2
Medal list
World Championships
Bronze medal – third place	2012 Nice	Ice dance
Bronze medal – third place	2014 Saitama	Ice dance
European Championships
Gold medal – first place	2011 Bern	Ice dance
Gold medal – first place	2012 Sheffield	Ice dance
Grand Prix Final
Silver medal – second place	2010–11 Beijing	Ice dance
Bronze medal – third place	2009–10 Tokyo	Ice dance
Bronze medal – third place	2011–12 Quebec City	Ice dance
Bronze medal – third place	2012–13 Sochi	Ice dance
Bronze medal – third place	2013–14 Fukuoka	Ice dance
French Championships
Gold medal – first place	2009 Colmar	Ice dance
Gold medal – first place	2011 Tours	Ice dance
Gold medal – first place	2012 Dammarie-les-Lys	Ice dance
Gold medal – first place	2013 Strasbourg	Ice dance
Gold medal – first place	2014 Vaujany	Ice dance
Silver medal – second place	2005 Rennes	Ice dance
Silver medal – second place	2006 Besançon	Ice dance
Silver medal – second place	2007 Orléans	Ice dance
Bronze medal – third place	2003 Asnières	Ice dance
Bronze medal – third place	2004 Briançon	Ice dance

Fabian Bourzat (French: [fabjɑ̃ buʁza]; born 19 December 1980) is a French retired ice dancer. With partner Nathalie Péchalat, he is a two-time World bronze medalist (2012, 2014), a two-time European champion (2011–2012), and a five-time French national champion (2009, 2011–2014). They have won five medals at the Grand Prix Final (2009, 2010, 2011, 2012, 2013) and thirteen other Grand Prix medals, including three golds at Cup of China and two at Trophée Eric Bompard.

== Personal life ==
Fabian Bourzat was born 19 December 1980 in Nantes, France. He has two older brothers. As a child, he traveled extensively with his family due to his father's work, returning to France when he was seven. Bourzat studied osteopathy at the Higher Institute of Osteopathy of Lyon. In 2023 he married a French single skater Laurine Lecavalier.

== Early years in skating ==
Bourzat began skating at the age of six or seven, from the start in ice dancing. Dominique Kernersson coached him in his early years. His early partners included Caroline Truong, Emeline Leroux and Albane Saillou.

== Partnership with Péchalat ==
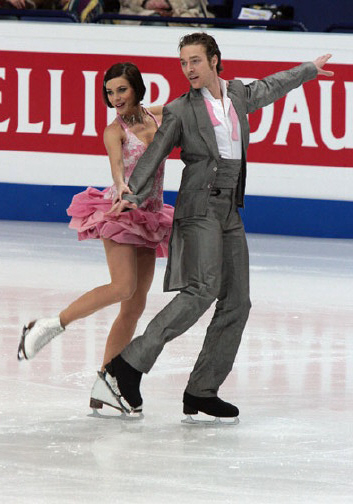
Péchalat and Bourzat at the 2009 Europeans

In 2000, Bourzat was partnered with Nathalie Péchalat by then-coach Muriel Zazoui. The two did not get along well at first but became friends over time. In a 2011 interview, Péchalat said they had different personalities but that he was the ideal skating partner for her: "He is very gifted. He works through feeling and inspiration. As soon as he feels a move, he can reproduce it and interpret it. He does not need to intellectualize." According to Bourzat, "Nathalie is always pulling the couple ahead and pushing us to work. She brings her extraordinary capacity to work. She always wants to do everything perfectly."

Péchalat/Bourzat were coached by Muriel Boucher-Zazoui and Romain Haguenauer from 2000 to mid-2008 in Lyon, France. From 2000 to 2003, they also worked with Pasquale Camerlengo. They skated as juniors for two years, winning two Junior Grand Prix medals.

=== 2003–2006 ===
Péchalat/Bourzat moved up to seniors at the beginning of the 2002–3 season. They won bronze medals at the 2003 and 2005 Winter Universiade. They made their Worlds debut in 2004, finishing 20th, and their Europeans debut in 2005, placing 12th. The duo competed at the 2006 Winter Olympics, where they came in 18th.

=== 2006–2008 ===
In the 2006–07 season, Péchalat/Bourzat won their first senior Grand Prix medal, a bronze at the 2006 Skate America. Péchalat lost around eight weeks of training in the winter due to a broken hand. The two missed the 2007 European Championships but were able to compete at the 2007 World Championships, where they finished in 12th place.

In the 2007–08 season, Pechalat/Bourzat won silver at both Skate America and the Cup of Russia, and qualified for their first Grand Prix Final, where they finished 6th. They were forced to miss the 2008 French National Championships after Bourzat underwent knee surgery for a torn meniscus, but returned to the ice in time for the 2008 Europeans, finishing 5th. They were 7th at the 2008 Worlds.

In July 2008, Péchalat/Bourzat moved to Moscow to train under Alexander Zhulin, with whom they had spent a few weeks in 2007, and his assistant Oleg Volkov. They said the move was difficult at first due to not knowing the Russian language and Moscow being a very expensive city to live in, however, from a skating perspective they felt it was a good move.

=== 2008–2009 season ===
Péchalat/Bourzat's 2008–2009 Grand Prix events were Skate Canada and the NHK Trophy. They made some changes to their programs following their 3rd-place finish at Skate Canada, and finished a close second at the NHK Trophy, winning both the original dance and the free dance. They did not qualify for the 2008–2009 Grand Prix Final. In December 2008, Pechalat/Bourzat won their first national title. At the 2009 Europeans, they were second in the free dance and fourth overall, missing out on a medal by less than half a point. They finished 5th at 2009 Worlds.

=== 2009–2010 season ===
For the 2009–10 season, Péchalat/Bourzat were assigned to the Trophee Eric Bompard and Skate Canada as their Grand Prix events. They finished in second place, behind Canadians Tessa Virtue / Scott Moir, in both events. These results qualified them for their second Grand Prix Final. Prior to the final, Bourzat suffered an ankle injury, but they were able to skate well enough to earn their first GPF medal, a bronze. Following a second consecutive 4th-place finish at Europeans and a 7th place at the Vancouver Olympics, Pechalat/Bourzat elected to return to their Circus free dance from the 2008–9 season. They then finished 4th at 2010 Worlds with new personal best scores in the compulsory dance, the free dance, and overall. They won the small bronze medal for the free dance.

=== 2010–2011 season ===
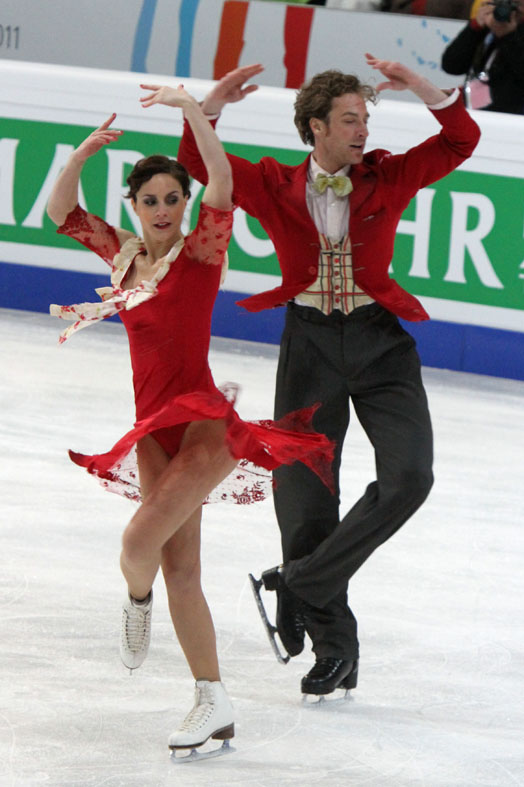
Péchalat and Bourzat compete at the 2011 Europeans.

Péchalat/Bourzat began the 2010–11 season with wins at the Nebelhorn Trophy and the Finlandia Trophy; the former was their first international gold medal at any level. They initially used Amélie for their short dance but replaced it with Doctor Zhivago prior to the 2010 Cup of China. Their programs scored well and they won their first Grand Prix by a large margin. They won their second Grand Prix title at 2010 Trophée Eric Bompard. They also set new personal best scores of 65.48 in the short dance and 96.34 in the free dance. Their results qualified them for the Grand Prix Final, where they won the silver medal. Their went on to French nationals, and won their second national title. At the 2011 European Championships they placed first in both the short dance and the free dance to win the gold medal, setting new personal bests in both segments of the competition. It was their first medal at an ISU Championship. They produced France's fifth ice dancing European title.

In mid-February 2011, Péchalat/Bourzat performed in galas in North Korea along with other international skaters. Bourzat said, "Traveling there was not a political act at all. We came as open-minded people, who wanted to discover and exchange."

At the 2011 Worlds, Péchalat/Bourzat set a new personal best in the short dance and were in bronze medal position going into the free dance. They dropped to fourth overall after Bourzat tripped and both fell during a step sequence. Following the event, reports surfaced that Péchalat / Bourzat would move to Michigan to train with Anjelika Krylova and Pasquale Camerlengo.

=== 2011–2012 season ===
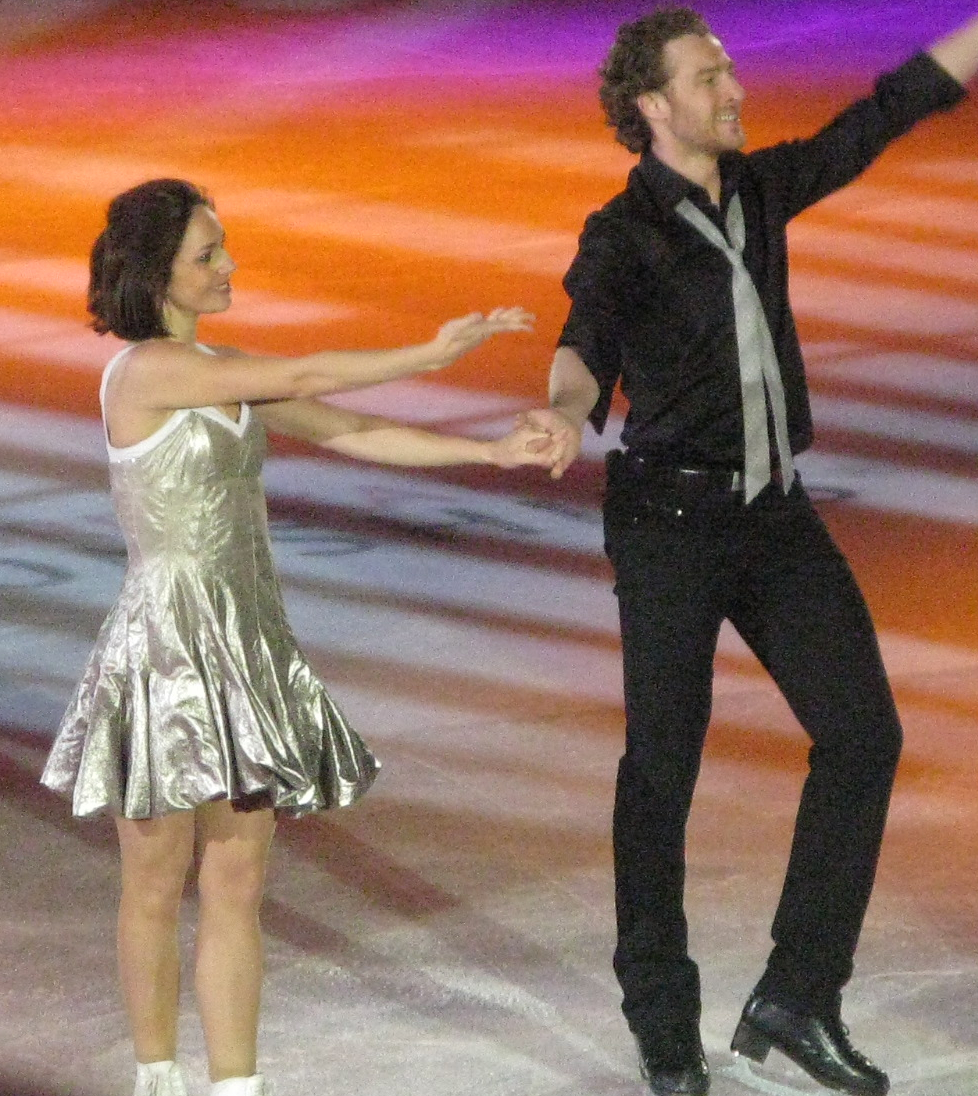
Nathalie and Fabian at 2012 World Championships.

In May 2011, Péchalat/Bourzat confirmed their move to the Detroit Skating Club in Bloomfield Hills, Michigan for the 2011–2012 season. They said that Camerlengo was the only coach they considered, based on their past experience of working with him during their time as juniors at Lyon, as well as wanting to continue the technique they learned under Zhulin: "[Krylova] is exactly in Zhulin's footsteps as she perpetuates the basics and technique he taught us." The French dancers remained on good terms with Zhulin and Volkov. In Michigan, they trained three hours a day on the ice and then did off-ice training. They lived close to the rink. They also spent time during the summer in Lyon to work with choreographer Kader Belmoktar on their Egypt-themed free dance.

Péchalat/Bourzat took up the new option of competing at three Grand Prix events and were assigned to 2011 Skate America, 2011 Skate Canada, and 2011 Trophee Eric Bompard. Although Bourzat was ill with bronchitis, they were able to win the silver medal at Skate America. They withdrew from Skate Canada due to Bourzat's bronchitis. After winning the silver medal at the Trophee Eric Bompard, they qualified for their fourth Grand Prix Final. They set a new personal best in the free dance to win the bronze medal at the Final. Their next competition was the French Championships, where they won their third national title.

At the 2012 European Championships, Péchalat/Bourzat were second after the short dance, but rallied in the free dance to win their second consecutive European title. Péchalat sustained a broken nose in training on 13 March. She said: "We just made a mistake during our twizzles, and I got knocked out." She began wearing a mask but decided to delay an operation until after the 2012 World Championships. On March 25, Péchalat/Bourzat confirmed they would compete at the event and said surgery would not be necessary. At the World Championships, they recorded a season's best score in the short dance and a personal best score in the free dance on their way to winning the bronze, their first World medal.

=== 2012–2013 season ===
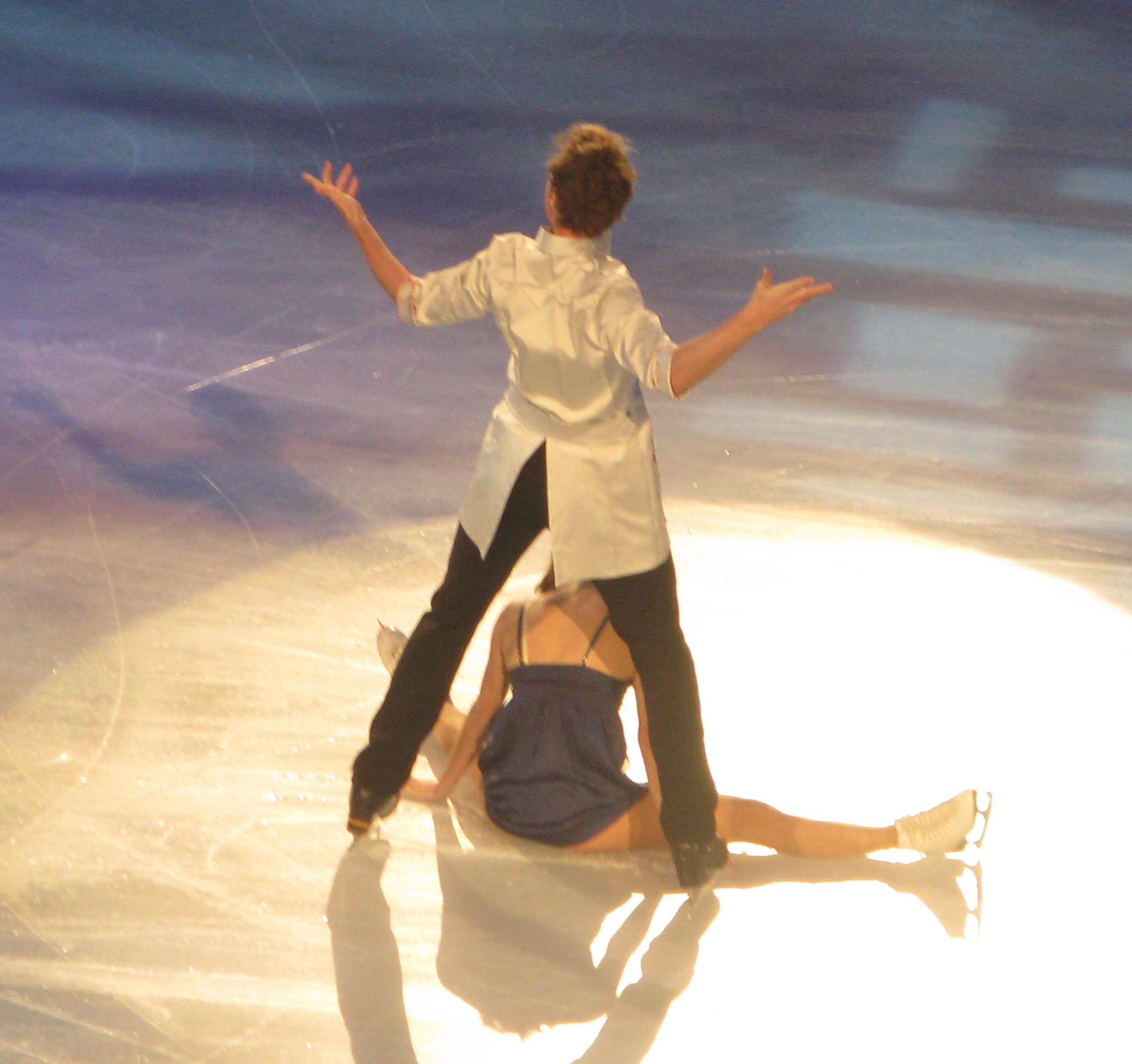
Bourzat at Bompard 2013.

Péchalat/Bourzat won gold at both of their events, the 2012 Cup of China and 2012 Trophee Eric Bompard, and qualified for their fourth Grand Prix Final, where they won bronze. On 9 January 2013, Bourzat sustained a partial tear of the adductor muscle of his right leg, resulting in the team's withdrawal from the 2013 European Championships. The duo decided to compete at the 2013 World Championships, motivated in part by the desire to obtain two spots for French ice dancers at the 2014 Olympics. They finished 6th at the event.

On 20 May 2013, at the French skating federation's suggestion, Péchalat/Bourzat announced a coaching change to Igor Shpilband in Novi, Michigan.

=== 2013–2014 season ===
Péchalat/Bourzat won gold at the 2013 Cup of China ahead of Bobrova/Soloviev. They were bronze medalists at the 2013 Trophée Eric Bompard behind Virtue/Moir and Ilinykh/Katsalapov. At the Grand Prix Final in Fukuoka, Japan, the French won the bronze medal, their fifth medal at the event, and then ended 2013 with their fifth national title. They withdrew from the 2014 European Championships to focus on the Olympics.

Péchalat/Bourzat placed fourth at the 2014 Winter Olympics in Sochi, Russia. Although they initially planned to retire right after the Olympics, they ultimately decided to end their competitive career at the 2014 World Championships in Saitama, Japan. Ranked third in the short dance and second in the free dance, Péchalat/Bourzat ended the competition in third overall, 0.06 of a point behind Italy's Anna Cappellini / Luca Lanotte and 0.04 behind Canada's Kaitlyn Weaver / Andrew Poje. They came away with their second World bronze medal. They then retired from competition but said they would continue performing together in shows for one or two years. Bourzat also intended to pursue coaching in collaboration with Shpilband.

== Programs ==
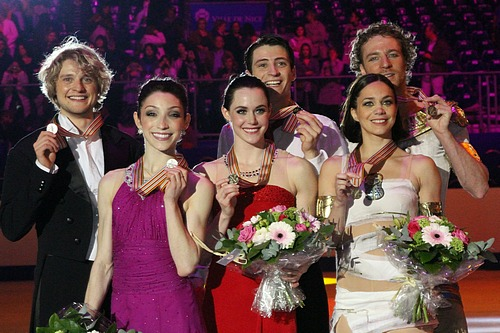
Péchalat/Bourzat during the medal ceremony at the 2012 Worlds.

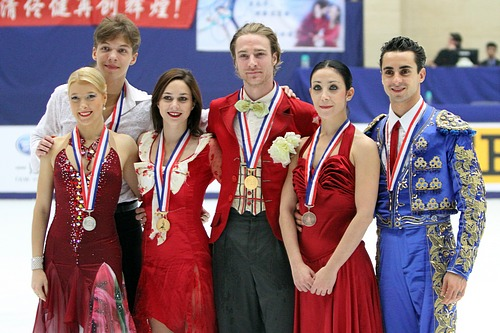
Péchalat/Bourzat after winning their first Grand Prix, the 2010 Cup of China.

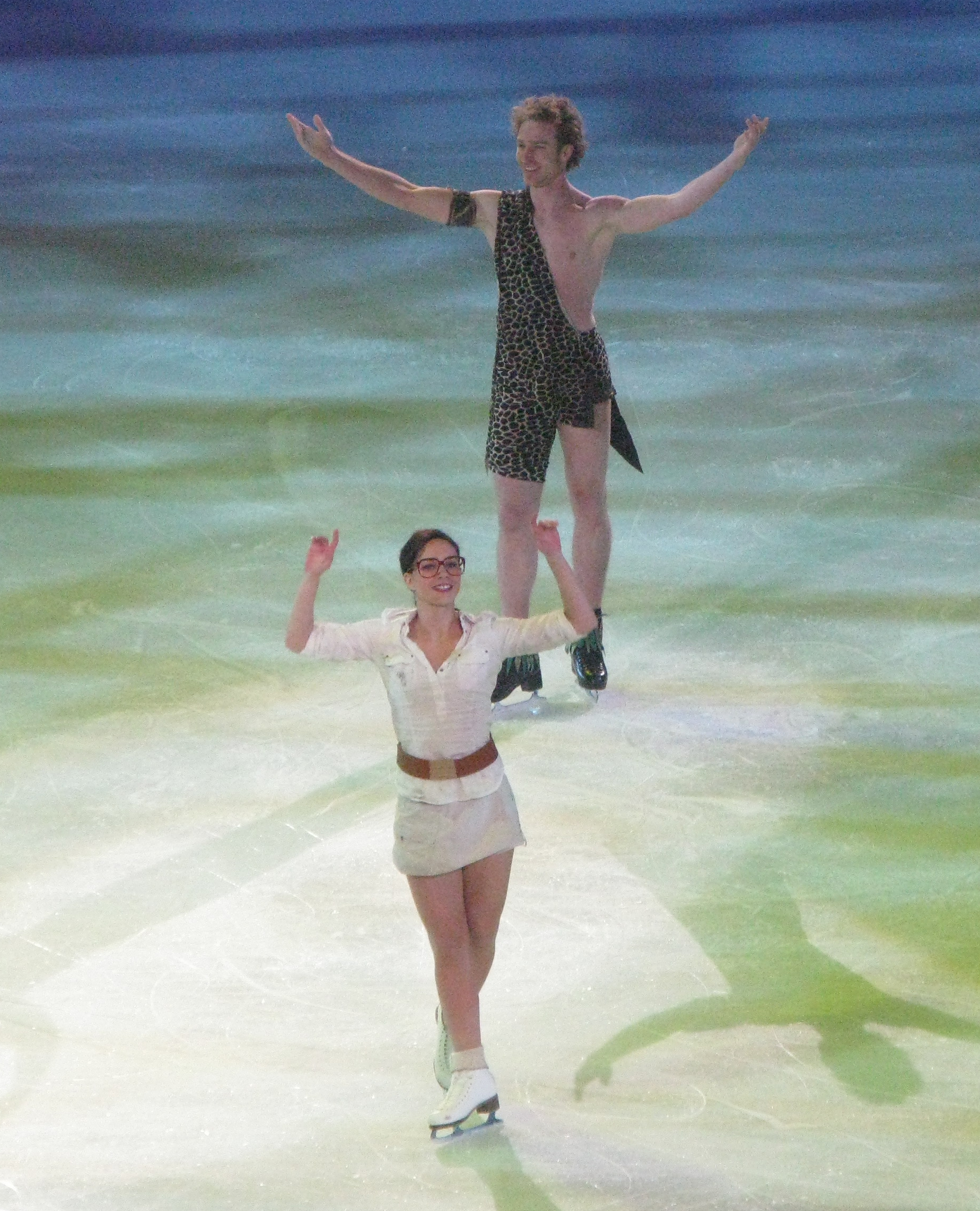
Péchalat/Bourzat at the 2010 Trophée Eric Bompard gala.

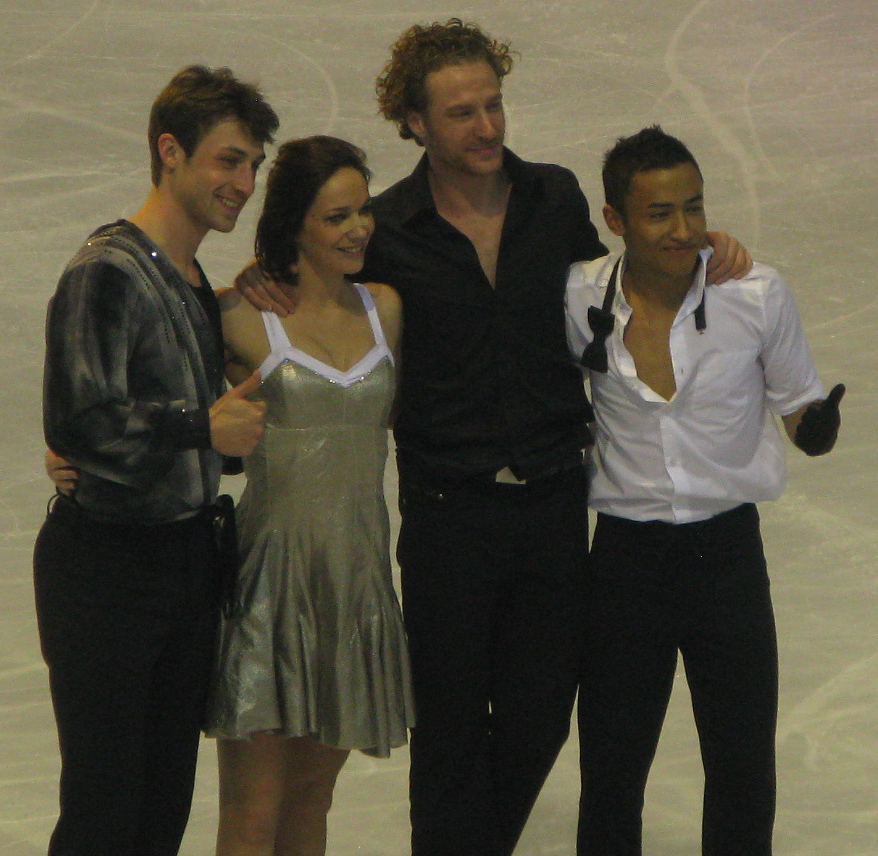
Péchalat/Bourzat with Brian Joubert and Florent Amodio at the 2012 World Figure Skating Championships

(with Pechalat)

Season	Short dance	Free dance	Exhibition
2013–2014	Final version: Slow foxtrot: Roxie (from Chicago) performed by Renée Zellweger; Quickstep: Sing, Sing, Sing by Louis Prima; Charleston: Mein Herr by John Kander choreo. by Laurie M. Ayivigan; Initial version: Slow foxtrot: Big Spender by Cy Coleman, Dorothy Fields; Quickstep: Sing, Sing, Sing by Louis Prima; Charleston: Mein Herr by John Kander choreo. by Laurie M. Ayivigan	"The Little Prince and his rose": Carrousel (from Quidam) by Benoît Jutras; Droit de Cite by Raphael Beaun and Max Steiner; Jeux Interdits by Fernando Sor; Le Petit Prince et sa Rose by Maxime Rodriguez choreo. by Julien Cottereau	Talk to Me; The Time of My Life (from Dirty Dancing); People Are Strange by The Doors; Tous les mêmes by Stromae
2012–2013	Polka: Gaîté Parisienne by Jacques Offenbach; Waltz: Sous le ciel de Paris performed by Yves Montand; Polka: Gaîté Parisienne by Jacques Offenbach	The Rolling Stones medley: Miss You; Angie; Sympathy for the Devil; Start Me Up	People Are Strange by The Doors; Charlie Chaplin medley
2011–2012	"Carnival in Rio": Mas que nada composed by Jorge Ben performed by Sérgio Mendes; Batucada by Abacaxi; Real in Rio by Sérgio Mendes choreo. by Ilia Ifraimov, Pasquale Camerlengo, Anjelika Krylova	"Mummy and Pharaoh": Passion by Peter Gabriel; In The Garden by Narada World; Le retour de Punt by Bernard Becker; Alf Layla Wa Layla by Ahmad Sidqi choreo. by Kader Belmoktar, Pasquale Camerlengo, Anjelika Krylova	The Time of My Life (from Dirty Dancing)
2010–2011	Lara's Theme (from Doctor Zhivago) by Maurice Jarre; Amélie by Yann Tiersen; Fuga y Misterio by Astor Piazzolla choreo. by Antonio Najarro	City Lights medley performed by London Symphony Orchestra choreo. by Alexander Zhulin	George of the Jungle; Chacun pour soi Tenue de soirée by Didier Barbelivien
	Original dance		
2009–2010	American country: Thank God, I'm a Country Boy by Roy Rivers, Dolly Parton; It's not over now by Dale Watson choreo. by Laurie May Ayvignan, P. Narboux	Kika by Ezekiel; Requiem for a Dream by Clint Mansell; Time by Maxime Rodriguez choreo. by Kader Belmoktar; Circus theme: La Notte di Favola by Nicola Piovani; La Marche des Gladiateurs; Jonglage by Maxime Rodriguez choreo. by Julien Cottereau	Circus theme: La Notte di Favola by Nicola Piovani; La Marche des Gladiateurs; Jonglage by Maxime Rodriguez; Andy by Les Rita Mitsouko
2008–2009	Lindy hop: It Don't Mean a Thing by The Puppini Sisters choreo. by Laurie May Ayvignan, S. Olive	Circus theme: La Notte di Favola by Nicola Piovani; La Marche des Gladiateurs; Jonglage by Maxime Rodriguez choreo. by Julien Cottereau	Mummy by Claude Challe; Andy by Les Rita Mitsouko
2007–2008	Spanish flamenco: Le Gitare al viento by Guadiana; Imagen del recuerdo by José Mercé; Blanca de Plata by Guadiana choreo. by Antonio Najarro	Organ Donor by DJ Shadow; Marla; Space Monkeys by Michael Simpson, John King choreo. by Laurie May Ayvignan, Kader Belmoktar	Mummy by Claude Challe
2006–2007	Mi Buenos Aires Querido by Carlos Libendinsky; Escualo by Astor Piazzolla choreo. by Laurie May Ayvignan	Four Seasons by Assen Merzouki choreo. by Mourad Merzouki	La Majorette by Bénabar; Four Seasons by Assen Merzouki choreo. by Mourad Merzouki
2005–2006	Samba: San-A-Samba by René Aubry; Rhumba: And I love Her by Jose Alberto; Salsa: From Chano	Les Misérables (musical) by Claude-Michel Schönberg choreo. by Laurie May Ayvignan	Mon cinema by Claude Nougaro
2004–2005	Slow foxtrot; Charleston; Quickstep	Cats (musical) by Andrew Lloyd Webber choreo. by Romain Haguenauer	Mon cinema by Claude Nougaro
2003–2004	Swing, Brother, Swing by Casey MacGill; If Can't Have You by Etta James; Swing, Brother, Swing by Casey MacGill choreo. by Pasquale Camerlengo	Babalu by Chano; Dance of the Soldiers by Red Army Choir; Hasta Siempre by Soledad Brave; Demasiado Corazon by Willy DeVille choreo. by Romain Haguenauer	
2002–2003	Masquerade by Aram Khachaturian; Tritsch Tratsch Polka by Johann Strauss II	Buddha Bar by Claude Challe; Elveda by Metin Arolat; Asla Vazgecemem by Tarkan version performed by unknown artist choreo. by Romain Haguenauer	
2001–2002	La Historia di un Amor by Claude Challe; Spanish Waltz; La Historia del' Amour by Claude Challe	Buddha Bar by Claude Challe	
2000–2001	The Sea; Katyusha – Midnight in Moscow	El Condor Pasa	

== Competitive highlights ==
(with Pechalat)

International
Event	00–01	01–02	02–03	03–04	04–05	05–06	06–07	07–08	08–09	09–10	10–11	11–12	12–13	13–14
Olympics						18th				7th				4th
Worlds				20th	19th	15th	12th	7th	5th	4th	4th	3rd	6th	3rd
Europeans					12th	11th		5th	4th	4th	1st	1st	WD	
Grand Prix Final								6th		3rd	2nd	3rd	3rd	3rd
GP Bompard			9th	8th	8th	5th	7th			2nd	1st	2nd	1st	3rd
GP Cup of China				7th	7th						1st		1st	1st
GP Cup of Russia						5th		2nd						
GP NHK Trophy									2nd					
GP Skate America							3rd	2nd				2nd		
GP Skate Canada			11th						3rd	2nd		WD		
Finlandia											1st			
Nebelhorn											1st			
Universiade			3rd		3rd									
International: Junior
Junior Worlds	8th	6th												
JGP Final		7th												
JGP China	2nd													
JGP France	6th													
JGP Japan		2nd												
JGP Netherlands		4th												
National
French Champ.	1st J.	1st J.	3rd	3rd	2nd	2nd	2nd		1st		1st	1st	1st	1st
Masters	1st J.	1st J.	2nd	3rd	1st	2nd		2nd	2nd	1st	1st			
Team events
Olympics														6th T (4th P)
WTT												4th T (3rd P)		
GP = Grand Prix; JGP = Junior Grand Prix; J. = Junior level; WD = Withdrew; T = Team result; P = Personal result; Medals awarded for team result only.
