= Tatsuki Machida =

Japanese figure skater (born 1990)

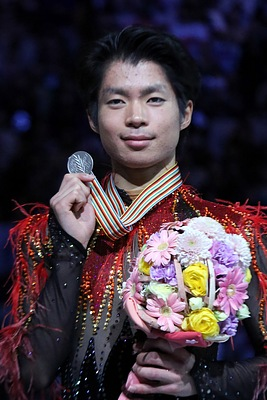
- Machida at the 2014 World Championships

Personal information
- Born: March 9, 1990 (age 36) Kawasaki, Kanagawa, Japan
- Height: 1.62 m (5 ft 4 in)

Figure skating career
- Country: Japan
- Skating club: Kansai University SC
- Began skating: 1993
- Retired: December 28, 2014 (competitive skating), October 6, 2018 (professional skating)

Medal record
World Championships
Silver medal – second place	2014 Saitama	Singles
Four Continents Championships
Silver medal – second place	2010 Jeonju	Singles
Japan Championships
Silver medal – second place	2013–14 Saitama	Singles

Japanese name
- Kanji: 町田 樹
- Kana: まちだ たつき
Transcriptions
- Romanization: Machida Tatsuki

Tatsuki Machida (町田 樹, Machida Tatsuki) (born March 9, 1990) is a Japanese retired figure skater. He is the 2014 World silver medalist, the 2010 Four Continents silver medalist, and the 2013–14 Japanese national silver medalist. Machida is the winner of four Grand Prix events — the 2012 Cup of China, 2013 Skate America, 2013 Rostelecom Cup, and 2014 Skate America.

== Personal life ==
Tatsuki Machida was born in Kawasaki, Kanagawa, Japan. He studied literature at Kansai University in Osaka. In 2015, he began a Master's program in sport management at Waseda University's Graduate School of Sciences.

== Career ==
In 2011, Machida moved to the U.S. to train at Lake Arrowhead, California's Ice Castle, where he was coached mainly by Anthony Liu.

Machida won his first senior Grand Prix medal, bronze, at the 2012 Skate America. He won his first senior GP title at the 2012 Cup of China, where he beat former World champion Daisuke Takahashi. These results qualified him for the Grand Prix Final, where he finished sixth overall.

At the 2013 Skate America, Machida won his second GP title. He placed first in the short and free programs, setting personal bests in both and winning by 25 points over second-place finisher, Adam Rippon of the United States. At 2013 Rostelecom Cup, Machida was second after the short program behind Maxim Kovtun of Russia. However, he won the free skate by over 25 points to win the competition – over 16 points ahead of Kovtun. This meant that he qualified for the Grand Prix Final in second overall, behind Patrick Chan of Canada. At the Grand Prix Final he recovered from a rough short program to skate a very strong long program, and finish 4th. He would finish 2nd at the 2013–14 Japan Figure Skating Championships, securing a spot on the Japanese Olympic and World teams for the first time.

At the 2014 Winter Olympics in Sochi, Machida placed 11th in the short program, fourth in the free skate, and fifth overall. Machida significantly improved his personal best short program score at the 2014 World Championships in Saitama, Japan and ranked first in the segment. He placed second in the free skate and was awarded the silver medal, finishing behind Yuzuru Hanyu by a margin of 0.33 of a point.

For the 2014–15 season, Machida was assigned to the 2014 Skate America and 2014 Trophée Éric Bompard. Skating to his second Skate America title, he placed first in the short and free programs, setting personal bests in both, and won by 30 points over the second-place finisher, Jason Brown of the United States. It was Machida's fourth GP title. At the 2014 Trophée Éric Bompard, he placed second in both the short program and the free program to finish second overall behind Maxim Kovtun. This qualified him for the Grand Prix Final for the third consecutive year. After finishing second in the short program, he struggled in the long program, finishing sixth in that segment and overall. Machida finished fourth at the 2014–15 Japan Championships and was selected for the 2015 World team. However, he announced his retirement from competitive skating to focus on his studies, and Takahito Mura was given his World spot.

In June 2018, Machida announced that his final appearance as a show skater would be Japan Open 2018 and Carnival on Ice 2018 on October 6, 2018. After his retirement, his focus would be on his studies.

== Cultural references ==
It has been reported that Machida was the inspiration for the character of Yuri Katsuki in the 2016 figure-skating anime Yuri on Ice, due to the similarities between Machida's real-life career and Katsuki's fictional career. The series author, Mitsurō Kubo, is a fan of Tatsuki.

== Programs ==
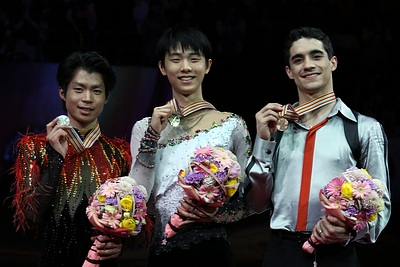
Machida at the 2014 World Championships podium

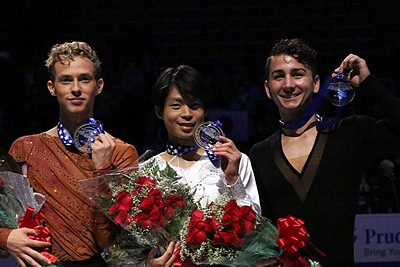
Machida at the 2013 Skate America podium

Season	Short program	Free skating	Exhibition
2014–2015	Fantasia for Violin and Orchestra (from Ladies in Lavender) by Nigel Hess performed by Joshua Bell choreo. by Phillip Mills	Symphony No. 9 by Ludwig van Beethoven choreo. by Phillip Mills	Je te veux by Erik Satie choreo. by Tatsuki Machida
2013–2014	East of Eden by Lee Holdridge choreo. by Phillip Mills	The Firebird by Igor Stravinsky choreo. by Stephane Lambiel	Byakuyakō [Journey Under the Midnight Sun] by Shin Kono choreo. by Tatsuki Machida
2012–2013	F.U.Y.A. by C2C choreo. by Stephane Lambiel	The Firebird by Igor Stravinsky choreo. by Stephane Lambiel	The Young Girls of Rochefort by Michel Legrand
2011–2012	Dark Eyes (Russia folk song) choreo. by Kenji Miyamoto	Don Quixote by Ludwig Minkus choreo. by Stephane Lambiel	Don't Stop Me Now by Queen
2010–2011	Dark Eyes (Russia folk song) choreo. by Kenji Miyamoto	Legends of the Fall by James Horner choreo. by Nanami Abe	Happy Feet choreo. by Kano Ogiyama
2009–2010	Celos (Tango Jalousie) by Jacob Gade performed by Taro Hakase choreo. by Kano Ogiyama	Casablanca by Max Steiner choreo. by Nanami Abe	Happy Feet choreo. by Kano Ogiyama
2008–2009	Peach〜Ashihara Story〜 (ex. 004) by Pe'z choreo. by Kano Ogiyama	Swan Lake by Pyotr Ilyich Tchaikovsky choreo. by Kano Ogiyama	Peach〜Ashihara Story〜 (ex. 004) by Pe'z choreo. by Kano Ogiyama
2007–2008	Boogie Woogie Bugle Boy by The Andrews Sisters choreo. by Noriko Sato	Swan Lake by Pyotr Ilyich Tchaikovsky choreo. by Kano Ogiyama	
2006–2007	Push the Limits by Enigma choreo. by Kano Ogiyama	The Red Violin by Ikuko Kawai choreo. by Kano Ogiyama	Find love by Enigma choreo. by Kano Ogiyama
2005–2006	Push the Limits by Enigma choreo. by Kano Ogiyama	The Red Violin by Ikuko Kawai choreo. by Kano Ogiyama	
2004–2005	Speed by Mark Mancina choreo. by Kano Ogiyama	Zatoichi by Keiichi Suzuki choreo. by Kano Ogiyama	

== Competitive highlights ==
- GP: Grand Prix; JGP: Junior Grand Prix

International
Event	03–04	04–05	05–06	06–07	07–08	08–09	09–10	10–11	11–12	12–13	13–14	14–15
Olympics											5th	
Worlds											2nd	
Four Continents							2nd		7th			
Grand Prix Final										6th	4th	6th
GP Bompard												2nd
GP Cup of China								5th		1st		
GP NHK Trophy									7th			
GP Rostelecom								11th			1st	
GP Skate America										3rd	1st	1st
Asian Games								4th				
Asian Trophy											1st	
Golden Spin									1st			
Nebelhorn								1st	WD			
Nepela Trophy										1st		
NRW Trophy							6th					
Printemps										2nd		
Triglav Trophy								1st				
Universiade						5th						
International: Junior
Junior Worlds				9th								
JGP Austria					9th							
JGP Czech Rep.				2nd								
JGP Estonia			10th									
JGP France		7th										
JGP Mexico				4th								
JGP Poland			7th									
JGP Spain						3rd						
JGP U.K.					1st							
Gardena			5th J.			1st J.						
National
Japan Champ.				13th		7th	4th	6th	4th	9th	2nd	4th
Japan Junior	12th	5th	7th	1st	7th	2nd						
Team events
Olympics											5th T	
