= 2012 Cup of China =

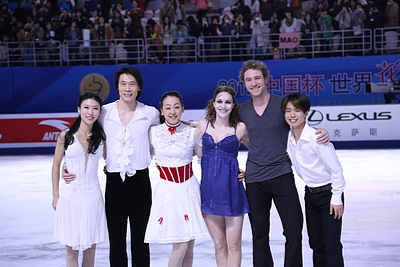
- Exhibition Gold Medalists in the figure skating competition, Cup of China 2012.
- Type: Grand Prix
- Date: November 2 – 4
- Season: 2012–13
- Location: Shanghai
- Host: Chinese Skating Association
- Venue: Shanghai Oriental Sports Center

Champions
- Men's singles: (Japan) Tatsuki Machida
- Ladies' singles: (Japan) Mao Asada
- Pairs: (China) Pang Qing / Tong Jian
- Ice dance: (France) Nathalie Pechalat / Fabian Bourzat
- Previous: 2011 Cup of China
- Next: 2013 Cup of China
- Previous GP: 2012 Skate Canada International
- Next GP: 2012 Cup of Russia

The 2012 Cup of China was the third event of six in the 2012–13 ISU Grand Prix of Figure Skating, a senior-level international invitational competition series. It was held at the Shanghai Oriental Sports Center in Shanghai on November 2–4. Medals were awarded in the disciplines of men's singles, ladies' singles, pair skating, and ice dancing. Skaters earned points toward qualifying for the 2012–13 Grand Prix Final.

== Eligibility ==
Skaters who reached the age of 14 by July 1, 2012 were eligible to compete on the senior Grand Prix circuit.

Prior to competing in a Grand Prix event, skaters were required to have earned the following scores (3/5 of the top scores at the 2012 World Championships):

Discipline	Minimum
Men	159.66
Ladies	113.43
Pairs	120.90
Ice dancing	109.59

== Entries ==
The entries were as follows.

Country	Men	Ladies	Pairs	Ice dancing
Canada	Kevin Reynolds	Amélie Lacoste	Kirsten Moore-Towers / Dylan Moscovitch	Kaitlyn Weaver / Andrew Poje
China	Guan Jinlin; Song Nan; Wang Yi	Li Zijun; Geng Bingwa; Zhang Ying	Pang Qing / Tong Jian; Peng Cheng / Zhang Hao; Wang Wenting / Zhang Yan	Huang Xintong / Zheng Xun; Yu Xiaoyang / Wang Chen
Finland		Kiira Korpi		
France	Brian Joubert			Nathalie Péchalat / Fabian Bourzat
Italy				Charlène Guignard / Marco Fabbri
Japan	Tatsuki Machida; Daisuke Takahashi	Mao Asada		
Russia	Sergei Voronov	Yulia Lipnitskaya; Sofia Biryukova	Yuko Kavaguti / Alexander Smirnov; Ksenia Stolbova / Fedor Klimov	Ekaterina Bobrova / Dmitri Soloviev; Victoria Sinitsina / Ruslan Zhiganshin
Sweden		Joshi Helgesson		
United States	Adam Rippon	Mirai Nagasu		Madison Chock / Evan Bates

== Overview ==
Carolina Kostner withdrew from the ladies' event due to insufficient fitness. Due to the 2012 China anti-Japanese demonstrations, the Japan Skating Federation said it would withdraw its competitors if the organizers did not provide security guarantees. Japan's pair Narumi Takahashi / Mervin Tran withdrew in order to undergo surgery. Satisfied with the security situation, the other Japanese skaters traveled to the event.

Although eight spots were available in the pairs event, only six teams competed due to withdrawals before the start of the competition. China's home team of Pang Qing / Tong Jian won the short program, followed by Russia's Yuko Kavaguti / Alexander Smirnov and Canada's Kirsten Moore-Towers / Dylan Moscovitch. In the free skate, Pang / Tong maintained their lead to win gold while Kavaguti / Smirnov took the silver and fellow Russian pair Ksenia Stolbova / Fedor Klimov rose from fifth to win the bronze, their first senior Grand Prix medal.

In the ice dancing event, World bronze medalists Nathalie Pechalat / Fabian Bourzat of France won the short dance ahead of Canada's Kaitlyn Weaver / Andrew Poje and Russia's Ekaterina Bobrova / Dmitri Soloviev. Pechalat / Bourzat maintained their lead in the free dance and took their third GP gold by over ten points over Bobrova / Soloviev, with Weaver / Poje 0.49 points behind in third.

In the ladies' event, World Junior champion Yulia Lipnitskaya of Russia won the short program ahead of two-time World Champion Mao Asada of Japan. Asada won the title after placing first in the free skate ahead of Lipnitskaia, whose silver was her first senior Grand Prix medal, while Finland's Kiira Korpi won the bronze. China's Geng Bingwa withdrew after the short program due to a sprained ankle.

In the men's event, Japan's Daisuke Takahashi won the short program over countryman Tatsuki Machida, with Russia's Sergei Voronov in third. Machida upset former World champion Takahashi to win his first senior Grand Prix title. Takahashi settled for silver, with Russia's Sergei Voronov winning the bronze, his first Grand Prix medal since 2010. Although ten spots were available in the men's event, the field was reduced to nine before the start of the competition and finished with seven due to withdrawals after the short program. China's Song Nan withdrew after sustaining a concussion in a collision with American Adam Rippon a minute into the final warm up before the free skate. Rippon said, "I kind of turned around to go into a jump and I think when Nan Song and I saw each other we both tried to avoid each other, but we went in the same way and we went head first into each other." Song was kept in the hospital overnight for observation. France's Brian Joubert withdrew due to abdominal pain and fever – his coach said he had passed out three times on the flight to China.

== Results ==
=== Men ===
Rank	Name	Nation	Total points	SP		FS	
1	Tatsuki Machida	Japan	236.92	2	83.48	1	153.44
2	Daisuke Takahashi	Japan	231.75	1	84.79	2	146.96
3	Sergei Voronov	Russia	217.61	3	73.58	3	144.03
4	Adam Rippon	United States	205.48	4	71.81	4	133.67
5	Kevin Reynolds	Canada	202.07	6	69.87	5	132.20
6	Wang Yi	China	188.27	8	57.25	6	131.02
7	Guan Jinlin	China	171.04	9	55.97	7	115.07
WD	Song Nan	China		5	70.86		
WD	Brian Joubert	France		7	63.27		

=== Ladies ===
Rank	Name	Nation	Total points	SP		FS	
1	Mao Asada	Japan	181.76	2	62.89	1	118.87
2	Yulia Lipnitskaya	Russia	177.92	1	63.06	2	114.86
3	Kiira Korpi	Finland	169.86	4	59.69	3	110.17
4	Mirai Nagasu	United States	163.46	3	59.76	4	103.70
5	Li Zijun	China	160.06	5	59.21	5	100.85
6	Amélie Lacoste	Canada	135.46	6	57.43	9	78.03
7	Joshi Helgesson	Sweden	134.43	7	49.67	7	84.76
8	Zhang Ying	China	130.65	9	43.38	6	87.27
9	Sofia Biryukova	Russia	127.36	8	44.39	8	82.97
WD	Geng Bingwa	China		10	36.53		

=== Pairs ===
Rank	Name	Nation	Total points	SP		FS	
1	Pang Qing / Tong Jian	China	188.82	1	68.57	1	120.25
2	Yuko Kavaguti / Alexander Smirnov	Russia	183.53	2	63.70	2	119.83
3	Ksenia Stolbova / Fedor Klimov	Russia	172.55	5	56.66	3	115.89
4	Kirsten Moore-Towers / Dylan Moscovitch	Canada	172.36	3	59.12	4	113.24
5	Peng Cheng / Zhang Hao	China	163.87	4	57.89	5	105.98
6	Wang Wenting / Zhang Yan	China	143.52	6	49.79	6	93.73

=== Ice dancing ===
Rank	Name	Nation	Total points	SD		FD	
1	Nathalie Péchalat / Fabian Bourzat	France	169.73	1	69.15	1	100.58
2	Ekaterina Bobrova / Dmitri Soloviev	Russia	159.46	3	64.32	2	95.14
3	Kaitlyn Weaver / Andrew Poje	Canada	158.97	2	65.59	3	93.38
4	Madison Chock / Evan Bates	United States	149.54	4	59.26	4	90.28
5	Charlène Guignard / Marco Fabbri	Italy	137.58	5	55.57	6	82.01
6	Victoria Sinitsina / Ruslan Zhiganshin	Russia	137.46	6	55.09	5	82.37
7	Huang Xintong / Zheng Xun	China	121.01	7	46.76	7	74.25
8	Yu Xiaoyang / Wang Chen	China	106.42	8	42.97	8	63.45
