= Evan Bates =

American ice dancer (born 1989)

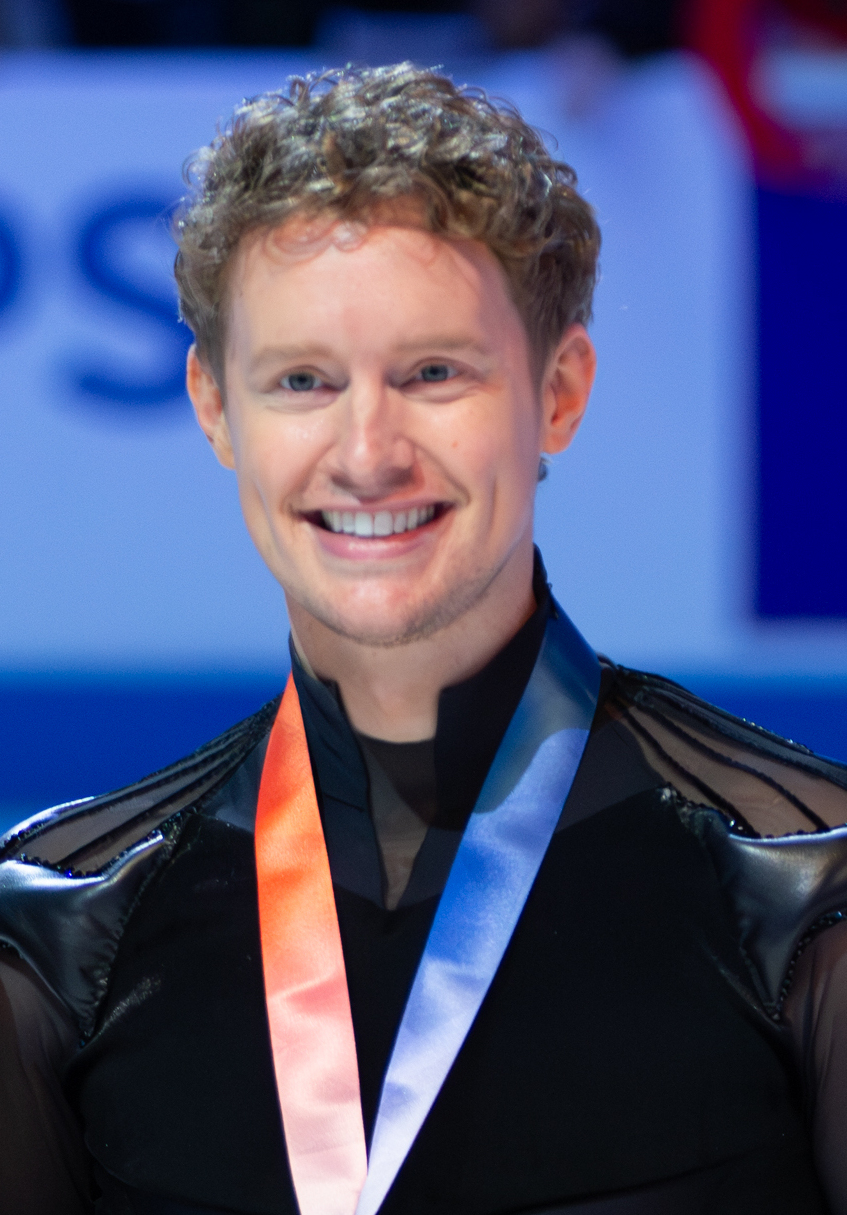
- Evan Bates at the 2026 U.S. Championships

Personal information
- Born: February 23, 1989 (age 37) Ann Arbor, Michigan, U.S.
- Height: 6 ft 2 in (1.87 m)

Figure skating career
- Country: United States
- Discipline: Ice dance
- Partner: Madison Chock (since 2011); Emily Samuelson (2005–10)
- Coach: Patrice Lauzon; Marie-France Dubreuil; Romain Haguenauer
- Skating club: Ann Arbor Figure Skating Club
- Began skating: 1993
- Highest WS: 1st (2015–16, 2016–17 & 2021–22)
| Event | Gold medal – first place | Silver medal – second place | Bronze medal – third place |
| Olympic Games | 2 | 1 | 0 |
| World Championships | 3 | 1 | 2 |
| Four Continents Championships | 3 | 3 | 3 |
| Grand Prix Final | 3 | 4 | 0 |
| U.S. Championships | 7 | 7 | 2 |
| World Team Trophy | 4 | 0 | 1 |
| World Junior Championships | 1 | 0 | 0 |
| Junior Grand Prix Final | 0 | 2 | 0 |
Medal list
Olympic Games
| Gold medal – first place | 2022 Beijing | Team |
| Gold medal – first place | 2026 Milano Cortina | Team |
| Silver medal – second place | 2026 Milano Cortina | Ice dance |
World Championships
| Gold medal – first place | 2023 Saitama | Ice dance |
| Gold medal – first place | 2024 Montreal | Ice dance |
| Gold medal – first place | 2025 Boston | Ice dance |
| Silver medal – second place | 2015 Shanghai | Ice dance |
| Bronze medal – third place | 2016 Boston | Ice dance |
| Bronze medal – third place | 2022 Montpellier | Ice dance |
Four Continents Championships
| Gold medal – first place | 2019 Anaheim | Ice dance |
| Gold medal – first place | 2020 Seoul | Ice dance |
| Gold medal – first place | 2023 Colorado Springs | Ice dance |
| Silver medal – second place | 2015 Seoul | Ice dance |
| Silver medal – second place | 2016 Taipei | Ice dance |
| Silver medal – second place | 2025 Seoul | Ice dance |
| Bronze medal – third place | 2009 Vancouver | Ice dance |
| Bronze medal – third place | 2013 Osaka | Ice dance |
| Bronze medal – third place | 2017 Gangneung | Ice dance |
Grand Prix Final
| Gold medal – first place | 2023–24 Beijing | Ice dance |
| Gold medal – first place | 2024–25 Grenoble | Ice dance |
| Gold medal – first place | 2025–26 Nagoya | Ice dance |
| Silver medal – second place | 2014–15 Barcelona | Ice dance |
| Silver medal – second place | 2015–16 Barcelona | Ice dance |
| Silver medal – second place | 2019–20 Turin | Ice dance |
| Silver medal – second place | 2022–23 Turin | Ice dance |
U.S. Championships
| Gold medal – first place | 2015 Greensboro | Ice dance |
| Gold medal – first place | 2020 Greensboro | Ice dance |
| Gold medal – first place | 2022 Nashville | Ice dance |
| Gold medal – first place | 2023 San Jose | Ice dance |
| Gold medal – first place | 2024 Columbus | Ice dance |
| Gold medal – first place | 2025 Wichita | Ice dance |
| Gold medal – first place | 2026 St. Louis | Ice dance |
| Silver medal – second place | 2009 Cleveland | Ice dance |
| Silver medal – second place | 2013 Omaha | Ice dance |
| Silver medal – second place | 2014 Boston | Ice dance |
| Silver medal – second place | 2016 Saint Paul | Ice dance |
| Silver medal – second place | 2017 Kansas City | Ice dance |
| Silver medal – second place | 2019 Detroit | Ice dance |
| Silver medal – second place | 2021 Las Vegas | Ice dance |
| Bronze medal – third place | 2010 Spokane | Ice dance |
| Bronze medal – third place | 2018 San Jose | Ice dance |
World Team Trophy
| Gold medal – first place | 2013 Tokyo | Team |
| Gold medal – first place | 2015 Tokyo | Team |
| Gold medal – first place | 2023 Tokyo | Team |
| Gold medal – first place | 2025 Tokyo | Team |
| Bronze medal – third place | 2017 Tokyo | Team |
World Junior Championships
| Gold medal – first place | 2008 Sofia | Ice dance |
Junior Grand Prix Final
| Silver medal – second place | 2006–07 Sofia | Ice dance |
| Silver medal – second place | 2007–08 Gdańsk | Ice dance |

Evan Bates (born February 23, 1989) is an American ice dancer. With his wife and skating partner, Madison Chock, he is a two-time Olympic gold medalist in the team event (2022, 2026), the 2026 Winter Olympics silver medalist, a three-time World champion (2023, 2024 and 2025), three-time Grand Prix Final champion (2023–24, 2024–25 and 2025–26), a three-time Four Continents champion (2019, 2020, 2023), a twenty-two-time ISU Grand Prix medalist (nine golds, eleven silvers, two bronzes), ten-time ISU Challenger Series medalist (four golds, five silver, one bronze), and a seven-time U.S. national champion (2015, 2020, 2022, 2023, 2024, 2025 and 2026). The two represented the United States at the 2014, 2018, 2022, and 2026 Winter Olympics. He served as flag bearer for the United States during the closing ceremony for the 2026 Winter Olympics.

With former partner Emily Samuelson, Bates is the 2009 Four Continents bronze medalist, the 2008 World Junior champion, and the 2009 U.S. national silver medalist. They competed at the 2010 Winter Olympics.

== Early life ==
Evan Bates was born in Ann Arbor, Michigan. He graduated from Huron High School in 2007 and from the University of Michigan in December 2013 with a degree in Organizational Studies.

== Early career ==
Evan Bates began skating at age four. He trained as a single skater and tested up to the Junior level in the USFSA testing structure; landing jumps through the double axel. He began training with ice dancing coaches Yuri Chesnichenko and Yaroslava Nechaeva after they moved to the United States.

=== First five seasons with Samuelson ===
Bates teamed up with Emily Samuelson in May 2000 following the suggestion of one of their coaches, Gary Clark. After competing on the juvenile level for one season, they moved up a level and won the U.S. national intermediate title in the 2001–2002 season.

In 2002–2003, Samuelson/Bates moved up another level and competed internationally for the first time through the North American Challenge Skate program, placing 10th in the novice ranks at the event in Thunder Bay, Ontario. They did not qualify to the 2003 U.S. Championships but did qualify to the 2004 U.S. Championships, where they won the novice bronze medal. The duo then took the novice silver medal at the Estonia International Ice Dancing Championships. They would win the national novice title at the 2005 U.S. Championships.

=== 2005–2006 season ===
Samuelson/Bates moved up to the junior level. They debuted on the ISU Junior Grand Prix. At the 2005–06 ISU Junior Grand Prix event in Slovakia, they placed sixth in the compulsory dance, tenth in the original dance, and 6th in the free dance to place eighth overall. At the event in Sofia, Bulgaria, they placed fifth in all three segments of the competition and overall. They won their sectional championship to qualify for the 2006 U.S. Championships, where they won the silver medal on the junior level. This medal qualified them for a trip to the 2006 Junior Worlds, where they placed tenth.

=== 2006–2007 season: Junior Grand Prix Final silver medalists ===
Samuelson/Bates remained on the junior level. They competed on the 2006–07 ISU Junior Grand Prix. At their event in Mexico, they won all three competition segments and the gold medal overall. At their event in Taipei, they placed second in the compulsory dance and won the original and free dances to win the gold medal overall. These medals qualified them for the Junior Grand Prix Final. At the Junior Grand Prix Final, they placed second behind training mates Hubbell/Hubbell. Qualifying for the Junior Grand Prix Final had given them a bye to the 2007 U.S. Championships. Competing again against the Hubbells, Samuelson/Bates won the junior national title. They were placed on the team to the 2007 World Junior Championships. At Junior Worlds, they were in second place going into the free dance. However, they were forced to withdraw from the competition in the middle of their free dance due to injury. Bates stepped on the back of Samuelson's hand after she fell shortly into the free dance, severing a tendon. Their withdrawal, combined with the placement of the other American teams, meant the U.S. would only have two entries to the 2008 Junior Worlds.

=== 2007–2008 season: World Junior champion and second Junior Grand Prix Final silver medalists ===
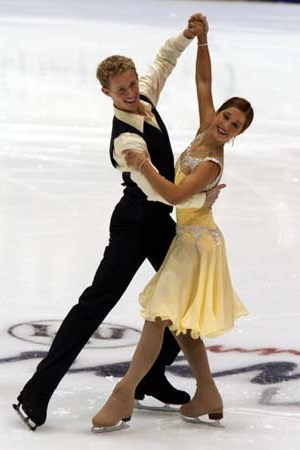
Samuelson and Bates at the 2007–08 Junior Grand Prix event in Lake Placid, New York

Samuelson/Bates remained juniors internationally but moved up to seniors nationally. They began their season on the 2007–08 ISU Junior Grand Prix. Skating with a minor knee injury at their first Junior Grand Prix event in Lake Placid, Samuelson/Bates won all three segments of the competition to win the gold medal overall. At their second event, they won both the compulsory and original dances but placed second in the free dance to win the gold medal overall. These medals qualified them for the 2007–08 Junior Grand Prix Final and also earned them a bye to the 2008 U.S. Championships. At the Junior Grand Prix Final, they placed third in the compulsory dance and second in the original and free dances to win the silver medal overall.

At the U.S. Championships, Samuelson/Bates made their senior national debut. They placed fourth in the compulsory and original dances. In the free dance, Samuelson/Bates fell during a lift that had been inserted into the program for the senior program due to the different requirements between junior and senior-level free dances. They placed 6th in the free dance and won the pewter medal, continuing their medal streak at the U.S. Championships. Their placement at the U.S. Championships earned them a trip to the 2008 World Junior Championships. At Junior Worlds, they won all three competition segments and the title overall.

=== 2008–2009 season: Four Continents bronze ===
Making their senior international debut, Samuelson/Bates won gold at the 2008 Nebelhorn Trophy after placing second in the compulsory dance and first in the next two segments. They finished fourth in their senior Grand Prix debut at the 2008 Skate America. At their next Grand Prix event, the 2008 NHK Trophy, they won the bronze medal after placing third in the compulsory dance, fourth in the original dance, and fourth in the free dance.

At the 2009 U.S. Championships, they placed second in all three segments of the competition and won the silver medal overall. It was their sixth consecutive medal at the U.S. Championships. Due to their result, they were assigned to the 2009 Four Continents and the 2009 World Championships. At the Four Continents, they placed fourth in the compulsory dance and then third in the original and free dances to win the bronze medal overall. At Worlds, they placed thirteenth in the compulsory dance, eleventh in the original dance, and ninth in the free dance for an eleventh-place overall result.

=== 2009–2010 season: First Olympics ===
Samuelson/Bates finished fifth at the 2009 Skate Canada International and fourth at the 2009 Trophee Eric Bompard. After taking the bronze medal at the 2010 U.S. Championships, they were named to the U.S. Olympic team. In February, they placed fourteenth in the compulsory dance, eleventh in the original dance, eleventh in the free dance, and eleventh overall at the 2010 Winter Olympics in Vancouver, Canada.

In March, Samuelson/Bates placed tenth in all segments but ninth overall at the 2010 World Championships in Turin, Italy. On April 28, 2010, they announced their decision to leave their long-time coaches, Yuri Chesnichenko and Yaroslava Nechaeva, to train with Igor Shpilband and Marina Zueva in Canton, Michigan.

=== 2010–2011 season: Injury and end of partnership ===
In September 2010, Bates sustained a complete laceration of his Achilles tendon after Samuelson struck him with her skate blade as she came down from a lift. As a result, they missed the entire 2010–2011 season. In June 2011, it was reported that they had ended their partnership. On June 28, 2011, Samuelson and Bates confirmed their split and said they were both looking for new partners.

== Chock and Bates career ==
=== 2011–2012 season: First season with Chock ===
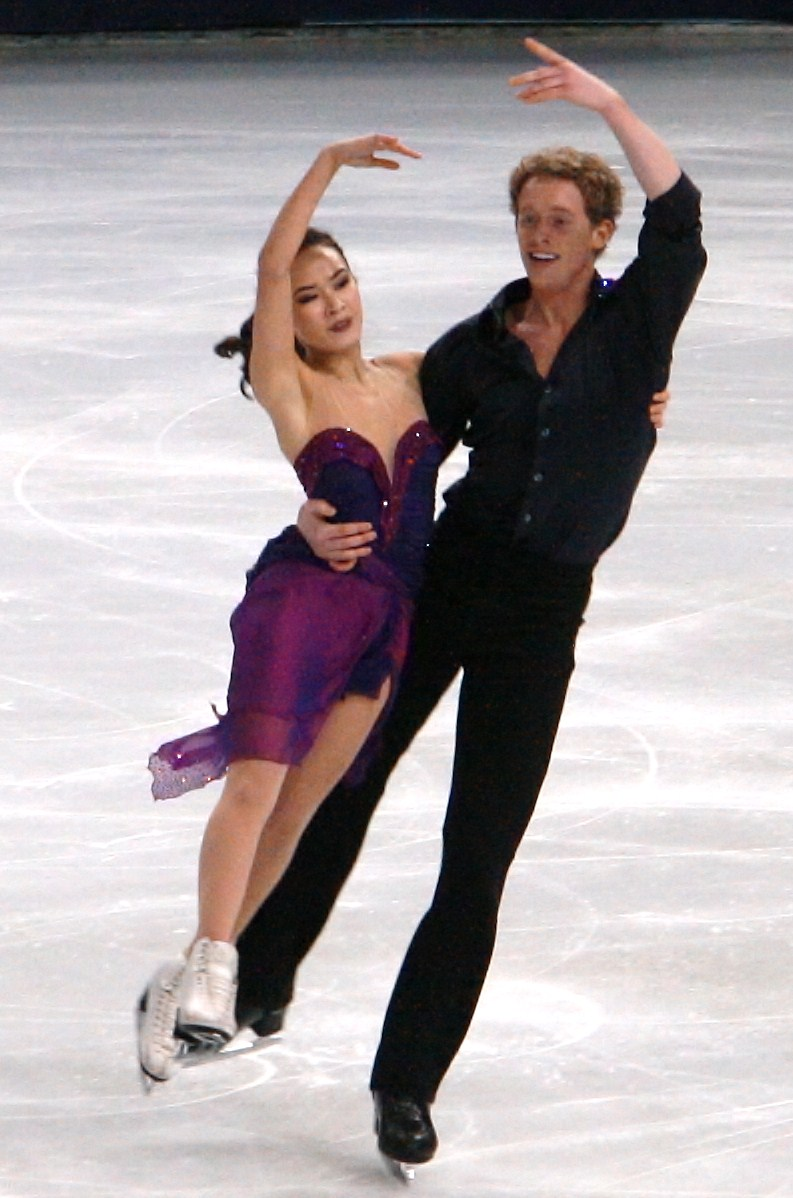
Chock and Bates at the 2011 Trophée Éric Bompard

On July 1, 2011, Bates and Madison Chock announced their partnership and that they would continue to be coached by Shpilband and Zueva. They finished fourth at the 2011 Skate Canada International, fifth at the 2011 Trophée Éric Bompard, and fifth at the 2012 U.S. Championships. After Zueva and Shpilband ended their coaching partnership, Chock/Bates were the first team to announce that they would continue training with Shpilband.

=== 2012–2013 season: Four Continents bronze ===
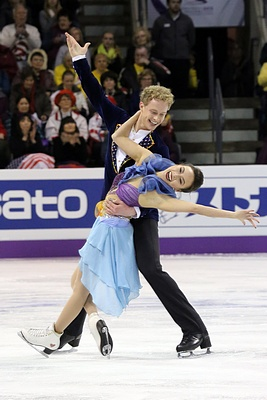
Chock and Bates at the 2013 World Championships

Chock/Bates finished fourth at the 2012 U.S. International Classic and then won gold at the 2012 Nebelhorn Trophy. They then competed at the 2012 Cup of China and finished fourth. At the 2013 U.S. Nationals, Chock/Bates were able to win the silver medal ahead of Shibutani/Shibutani. They were named in the U.S. team to the 2013 Four Continents, where they won the bronze medal. They finished seventh overall at the 2013 World Championships. Chock/Bates competed at the 2013 World Team Trophy and placed first in ice dance, helping Team USA win the team gold for the first time since 2009.

=== 2013–2014 season: Sochi Olympics ===
Chock and Bates were assigned to two Grand Prix events, the 2013 Cup of China and 2013 Rostelecom Cup, and won bronze at both. They won the silver medal at the 2014 U.S. Championships and were named to the U.S. Olympic team. They finished eighth at the 2014 Winter Olympics in Sochi, Russia.

Chock and Bates placed fourth in the short dance, fifth in the free dance, and fifth overall at the 2014 World Championships in Saitama, Japan.

=== 2014–2015 season: World silver, Four Continents silver and first Grand Prix Final medal ===
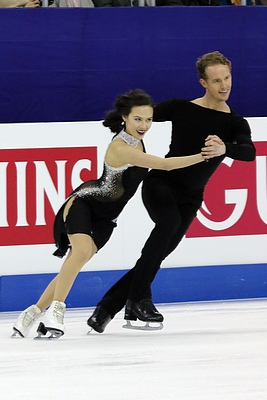
Chock and Bates at the 2015 World Championships

Chock/Bates took silver at the 2014 Nebelhorn Trophy, an ISU Challenger Series event, and then won both their Grand Prix events at the 2014 Skate America and 2014 Rostelecom Cup. The team went on to win the silver at the Grand Prix Final in December and then their first senior national title at the 2015 U.S. Championships in January.

In February, Chock/Bates won silver at the 2015 Four Continents Championships in Seoul, where they finished second to Canada's Weaver/Poje by a margin of 1.28 points. In March, they capped off their season with silver at the 2015 World Championships in Shanghai, China. Ranked first in the short dance and second in the free, they finished with a total score 2.94 points less than the champions, Papadakis/Cizeron of France, and 1.92 more than the bronze medalists, Weaver/Poje.

=== 2015–2016 season: World bronze, second consecutive Four Continents and Grand Prix Final medal ===
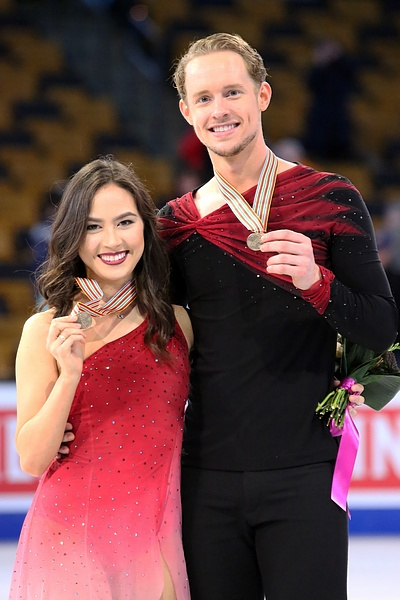
Chock and Bates at the 2016 World Championships

Chock/Bates won gold at the 2015 Nebelhorn Trophy, again an ISU Challenger Series event. At the event, they received comments that "Dark Eyes" was not suitable for a polka rhythm. They changed the short dance music to "More" and "Unchained Melody" to clarify the rhythms, and won the gold at the 2015 Skate America followed by a silver at 2015 Cup of China. They then won the silver medal at the 2015–16 Grand Prix Final in Barcelona, behind Canadians Weaver/Poje.

In March, Chock/Bates won the bronze medal at the 2016 World Championships in Boston, having finished third behind Papadakis/Cizeron and Shibutani/Shibutani in both segments.

=== 2016–2017 season: Four Continents bronze ===
Chock/Bates began their season with silver medals at four international events, the 2016 CS Nebelhorn Trophy, 2016 CS Ondrej Nepela Memorial, 2016 Skate Canada International, and 2016 Rostelecom Cup. In December, they placed sixth in the short dance, fourth in the free, and sixth overall at the Grand Prix Final in Marseille, France. In January, they ranked second in the short dance and first in the free dance at the 2017 U.S. Championships, losing overall to the Shibutanis by 1.01.

Chock/Bates took the bronze medal at the 2017 Four Continents Championships in Gangneung, South Korea, where they finished behind Canada's Virtue/Moir and the Shibutanis. They finished seventh overall (fourth in the short, eighth in the free) at the 2017 World Championships in Helsinki, Finland.

=== 2017–18 season: Pyeongchang Olympics ===
Chock competed with an injury after bone fragments chipped off her right ankle in August 2017, just before Champs Camp. She and Bates won silver medals at the 2017 Cup of China and 2017 Internationaux de France, which meant that they qualified to their fourth consecutive Grand Prix Final. They placed fifth in the short dance, third in the free, and fifth overall at the December event in Nagoya, Japan.

At the 2018 U.S. Championships, Chock/Bates placed third in the short dance, first in the free dance, and third overall, scoring 0.52 less than the champions, Hubbell/Donohue, and 0.33 less than the Shibutanis.

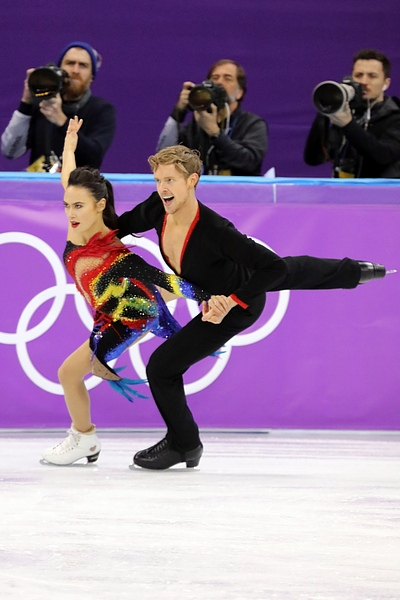
Chock and Bates at the 2018 Winter Olympics

They were not selected for the team competition but competed in the individual ice dancing event at the 2018 Winter Olympics, which took place in February in Gangneung, South Korea. Chock reinjured her ankle in the final moments of the warm-up before the short dance. She stated that it was an "osteochondral lesion" with a loose bone fragment in her joint. The duo placed seventh in the short dance. Skating their "Imagine" program in the free dance, the blades of their skates caught on the entrance of their combination spin, resulting in both falling and invalidating the entire element. They placed twelfth in the free dance and ninth overall. Speaking afterward, Chock said that her previous injury was not responsible for the fall and that at that moment, "I knew it was over. I knew there was no shot. After working so hard all this season and going through so much and trying to stay healthy and then just losing it at a crucial moment, it was really, really heartbreaking."

In March, they finished fifth at the 2018 World Championships in Milan, Italy. On April 6, 2018, Chock underwent surgery to remove the loose bone fragments in her right ankle. In late May, Chock/Bates announced a coaching change, stating that they would begin training in the summer with Marie-France Dubreuil, Patrice Lauzon, and Romain Haguenauer in Montreal, Quebec, Canada.

=== 2018–2019 season: Four Continents gold ===
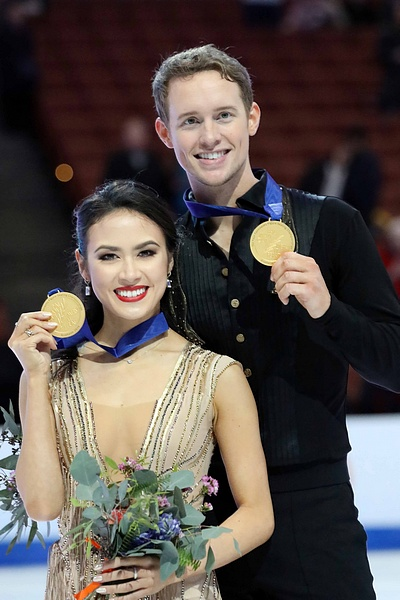
Chock and Bates winning their first Four Continents title (2019)

Chock and Bates were initially assigned to two Grand Prix events, the newly created Helsinki Grand Prix and the Rostelecom Cup. Chock's recovery from her ankle surgery necessitated their withdrawal, and they did not compete in the first half of the season.

In January, they returned to competition at the Toruń Cup in Poland, winning decisively. They then competed at the 2019 U.S. Championships in Detroit, where they placed second in both programs, winning the silver medal behind Hubbell/Donohue. Both praised their new coaches and training environment afterward, with Bates saying they were "really happy with the performance here in Detroit. This self-belief is a belief in each other, our training mates, and coaches, and that is a strength that will carry us back to where we want to go." They were assigned to compete at the Four Continents and World Championships.

At the Four Continents Championships, held in Anaheim, Chock/Bates placed second in the rhythm dance, again behind Hubbell/Donohue. They placed first in the free dance and first overall, following a series of errors by Hubbell/Donohue, principally their planned stationary lift being reduced to base value after traveling too much. This was the team's first gold medal at an ISU Championship, prompting Bates to observe, "we got a lot of medals, none of them are gold. I am surprised. If you had told us that we would win Four Continents when we pulled out of the Grand Prix four months ago, I think we would be very surprised. But we’re very happy now." Chock stated that she considered the placement secondary to "newfound joy and happiness" in their skating.

Chock/Bates concluded their season at the 2019 World Championships, where they finished sixth.

=== 2019–2020 season: Second Four Continents gold and national titles ===
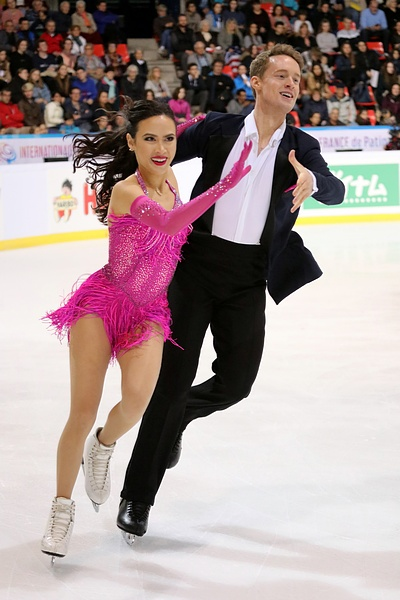
Chock and Bates at the 2019 Internationaux de France

Beginning the season on the Challenger series, Chock/Bates won gold at the 2019 CS U.S. Classic, winning by almost 14 points over silver medalists Carreira/Ponomarenko. At their second Challenger, the 2019 CS Finlandia Trophy, they won a second gold medal, despite the loss of an element in their free dance.

On the Grand Prix, Chock/Bates began at the 2019 Internationaux de France, where they placed second in the rhythm dance despite hitting only one of the four key points in the Finnstep pattern dance. Second in the free dance, they also won the silver medal. The following week at the 2019 Cup of China, they again placed second in the rhythm dance and obtained only one of the four Finnstep key points. Chock/Bates won the free dance decisively, but remained in second place overall. At the Grand Prix Final, Chock/Bates scored a season's best in the rhythm dance, placing third while obtaining three of the four Finnstep key points. They also scored a personal best in the free dance, finishing second in the free dance and second overall, returning to the Grand Prix Final podium for the first time since 2015. Speaking afterward, Chock attributed much of their success to their Egyptian Snake Dance free program, saying, "there’s no other program like this in ice dance."

At the 2020 US Championships in Greensboro, Chock/Bates finished first in the rhythm dance, 1.02 points ahead of Hubbell/Donohue despite a slip in their Finnstep pattern. After the free dance, they were first overall, winning their second US title five years after their first one, which is the longest gap between ice dance titles in US history. They also won with the largest margin of victory in US ice dance since the Davis/White era, 4.67 points.

At the 2020 Four Continents Championships in Seoul, Chock/Bates finished second in the rhythm dance with a personal best score of 85.76, just 0.2 points behind Hubbell/Donohue. In the free dance, Chock/Bates finished first despite falling on a transition. They successfully defended their Four Continents title, becoming the first ice dance couple to do so since Belbin/Agosto from 2004 to 2006. Chock/Bates were assigned to compete at the World Championships in Montreal, but these were canceled as a result of the coronavirus pandemic.

=== 2020–2021 season ===
Chock and Bates remained in Montreal during the pandemic and were off-ice for three months before the rink reopened for training. The duo lost a month of training to an injury to Chock. She suffered a concussion after fainting after a walk on a hot day in July. They spent another two weeks in quarantine due to COVID-19 exposure, though neither tested positive. As a result, they abandoned plans to use a new free dance for the season and withdrew from the 2020 Skate America.

At the 2021 U.S. Championships, Chock/Bates finished first in the rhythm dance, 0.44 points ahead of Hubbell/Donohue despite Chock losing a twizzle level. In the free dance, Bates stepped out of his twizzles, resulting in them finishing second in the free dance and overall. They were named to the US team for the 2021 World Championships in Stockholm where they finished fourth in the competition.

The Stockholm World Championships were held without an audience due to the pandemic, with Chock/Bates' training partners and four-time World Champions Papadakis/Cizeron declining to attend due to their own COVID illness and lost training time. This led to a hotly contested podium, generally seen as being between six teams, them included. Chock/Bates placed third in the rhythm dance, narrowly behind Hubbell/Donohue in second and over two points ahead of Canada's Gilles/Poirier in fourth. Bates lost a twizzle level in the free dance. They placed fourth in that segment, dropping to fourth place overall behind Gilles/Poirier in third. Their fourth place combined with Hubbell/Donohue's second qualified three berths for American dance teams at the 2022 Winter Olympics.

=== 2021–22 season: Beijing Olympic team gold, World bronze, and third national title ===
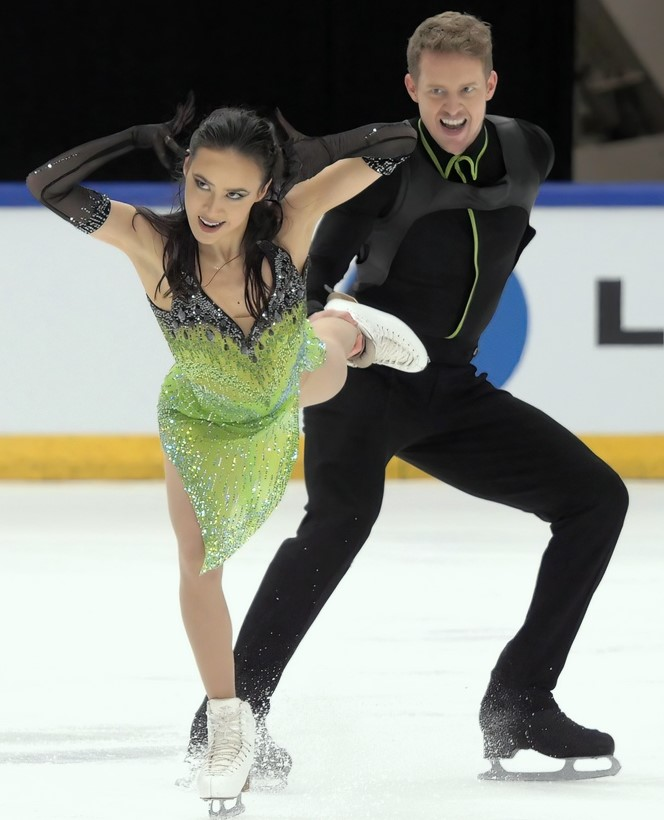
Chock and Bates performing their rhythm dance at the 2021 CS Finlandia Trophy

The team selected a medley of Billie Eilish songs to perform for their rhythm dance while, following the success of their Egyptian Snake Dance program, aimed to replicate that success with a new "Contact" program built around the concept of an astronaut romancing an alien. Making their season debut at the 2021 CS Finlandia Trophy, Chock/Bates won the silver medal behind training mates Papadakis/Cizeron.

On the Grand Prix, Chock/Bates competed first at the 2021 Skate America, also attended by primary domestic rivals Hubbell/Donohue. Placing second in both programs, they won the silver medal after finishing 1.31 points behind Hubbell/Donohue. At their second event, the 2021 NHK Trophy, Chock/Bates placed narrowly second in the rhythm dance, only 0.31 points behind reigning World champions Sinitsina/Katsalapov. Bates fell right at the beginning of the free dance, though not on an element, and they remained in second place. Assessing the error, Bates said afterward, "we responded well and put together a good performance considering the early mishap." Their results qualified them to the Grand Prix Final, but it was subsequently canceled due to restrictions prompted by the Omicron variant.

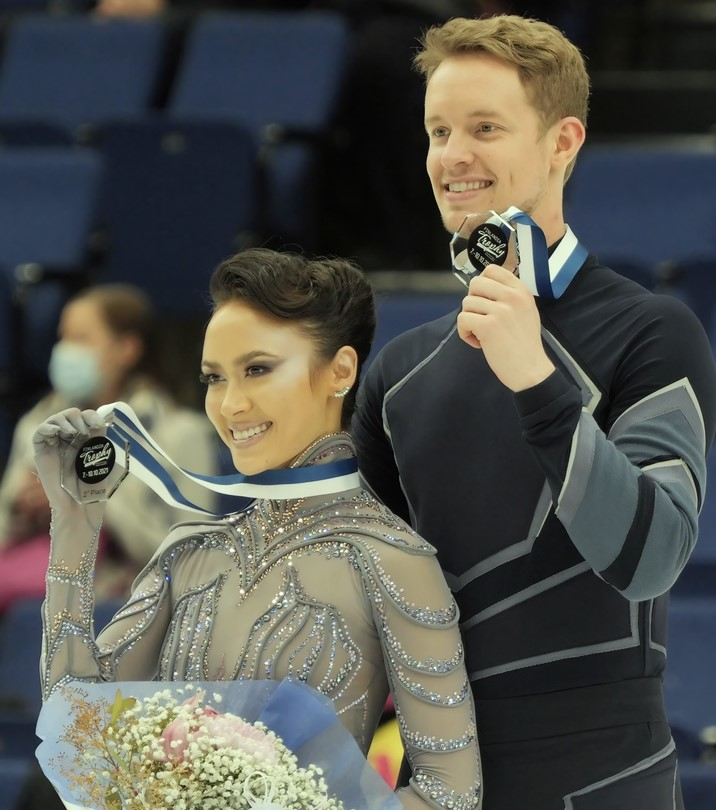
Chock and Bates during the medal ceremony at the 2021 CS Finlandia Trophy

At the 2022 U.S. Championships, Chock/Bates placed first in the rhythm dance, leading by 2.55 points over Hubbell/Donohue. They placed second in the free dance but won overall by 1.78 points due to their lead in the rhythm dance. They were named to the American Olympic team, the third such for Chock and fourth for Bates. Bates became the first U.S. skater of any discipline to compete in four Winter Olympics.

Chock/Bates began the 2022 Winter Olympics as the team captains and American entries in the free dance segment of the Olympic team event. At the time they took the ice, a fifth-place finish in the pairs free segment by Knierim/Frazier had raised the possibility of the second-place American team dropping to third behind Team Japan. However, Chock/Bates would unexpectedly win the segment over Russian entries Sinitsina/Katsalapov, securing America's position over Japan. The American team ultimately won the silver medal, the first Olympic medal for both Chock and Bates. However, following a positive doping test of Russia's gold medalist Kamila Valieva, the team members were not awarded their medals, pending an investigation. In January 2024, the Court of Arbitration for Sport disqualified Valieva, and the gold medal was awarded to the U.S. team. In the dance event days later, Chock stumbled midway through the performance, and they finished fourth in the segment. Bates admitted to having "mixed feelings" about the performance," but said, "it's not over yet." Fourth in the free dance as well, they finished fourth overall. Bates said after: "I think the fourth place sometimes can be one of the hardest places to finish. But the fact that there are only three spots on the podium is what makes this sport so furious and so loved by so many people and the fans at home and the athletes too. We want the competition to be strong and deep, and that’s exactly what it is."

Chock and Bates concluded the season at the 2022 World Championships, held in Montpellier. Chock/Bates were third in the rhythm dance with a personal best 87.51 score. Third as well in the free dance, they took the bronze medal returning to the World podium for the first time in six years. With Papadakis/Cizeron taking the gold medal and Hubbell/Donohue the silver, the entire podium consisted of skaters from the Ice Academy of Montreal. Chock said, "it was a dream to be able to share that podium with our training mates and to be back on the podium after what feels like a very, very long time."

=== 2022–2023 season: World champion and third Four Continents title ===
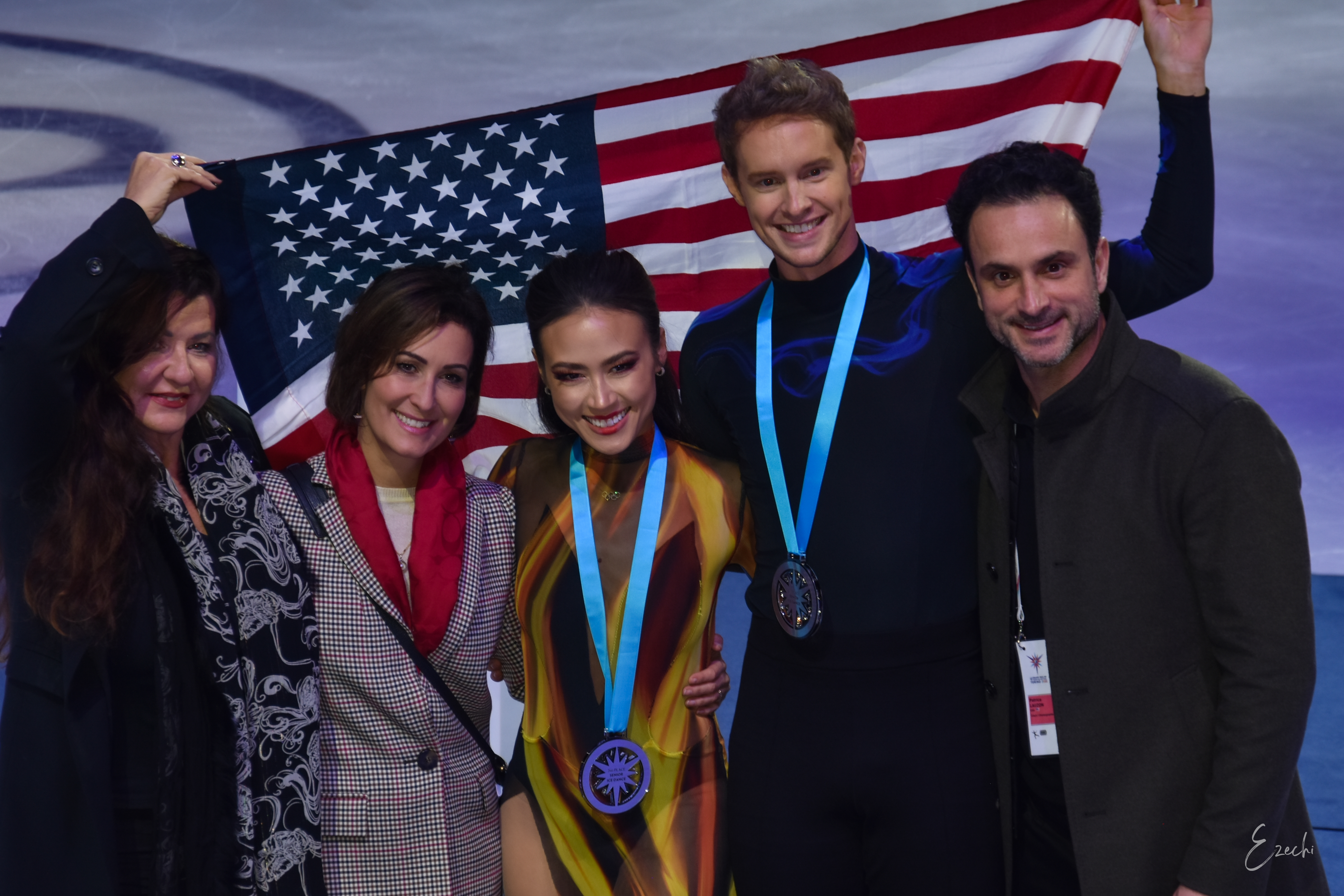
Chock and Bates with coaches, Marie-France Dubreuil and Patrice Lauzon at the 2022–23 Grand Prix Final

With another Olympic cycle, the two faced questions about retirement, to which Bates responded, "these are the most enjoyable years of our career. We're not ready to step away from competitive ice just yet." With Hubbell/Donohue retired and Papadakis/Cizeron sitting out at least the season, the two entered the 2022–23 season perceived as favorites for the World title; Chock called this "a big goal of ours, and it always has been." The two toured for three months following the Montpellier World Championships, performing in forty skating shows, and as a result, were not prepared in time to participate in a Challenger event.

For their free dance for the new season, they opted for a medley of songs by Quebec musician Jorane and a program theme inspired by Chock's vintage 1920 engagement ring, namely, "how love is connected and flows through time and transcends the physical world." In their competitive debut on the Grand Prix at the 2022 Skate America, they won the gold medal, albeit losing the free dance to domestic rivals Hawayek/Baker after their choreographic slide element was invalidated. This was their first Grand Prix gold since 2015. Following Skate America, significant alterations were made to their free dance, incorporating the music "Souffrance" by Orange Blossom while also "evolving" the concept to be "about the relationship of the spirit of fire and spirit of air and how one cannot survive without each other." They were generally considered the favorites to win the 2022 NHK Trophy, their second event, but they unexpectedly finished second behind Canadian training partners Fournier Beaudry/Sørensen, taking the silver medal. Chock acknowledged the expectations, saying, "we discussed what the season will look like for ourselves, and I think each season always offers new adversity and new obstacles. And this season is no different. Our goal remains the same: we want to win Worlds this year."

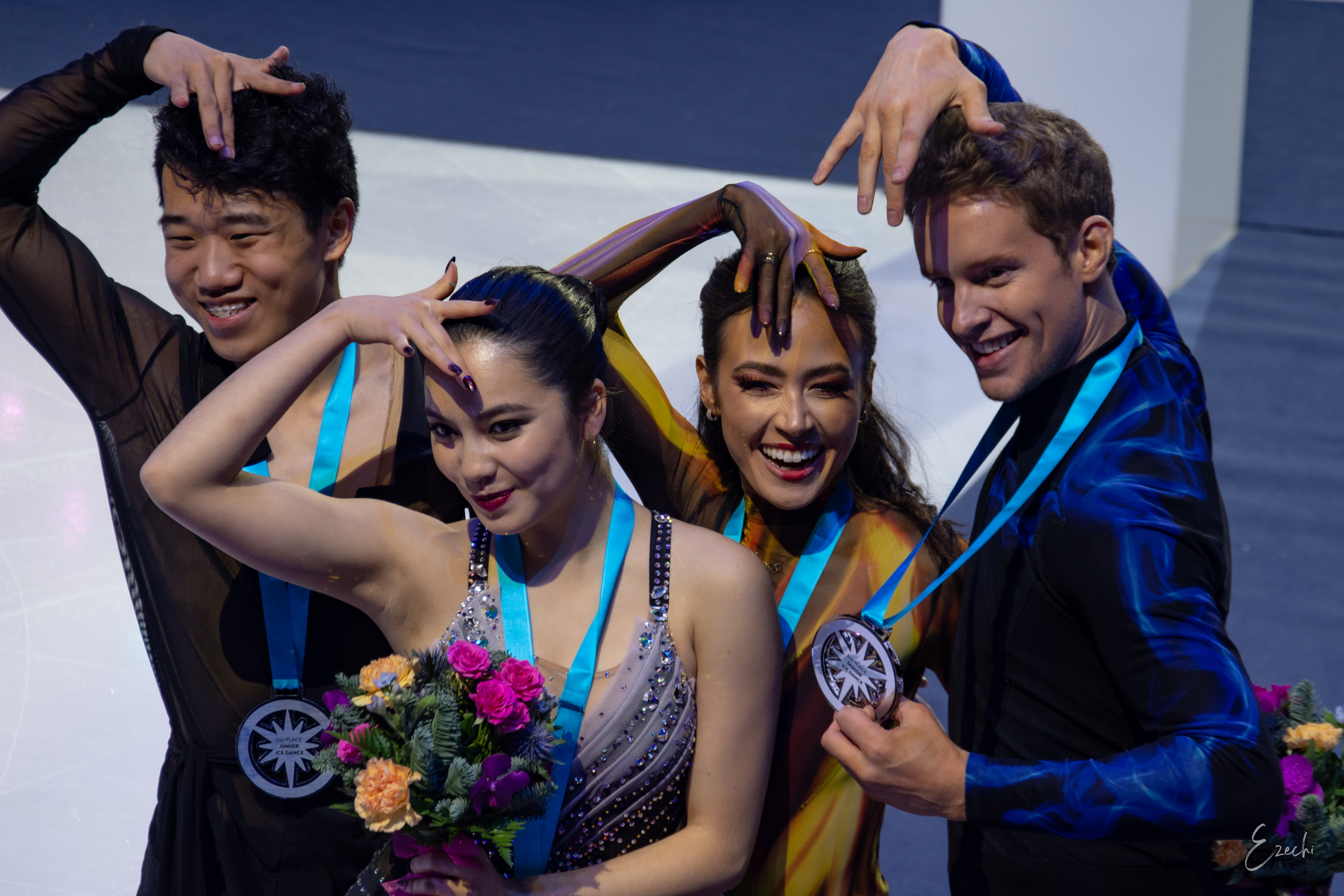
Chock and Bates with South Korean ice dancers Hannah Lim and Ye Quan, 2022

Entering the Grand Prix Final in Turin perceived to be on the back foot against top-seeded Canadians Gilles/Poirier and Italian champions Guignard/Fabbri. However, they performed well in the rhythm dance, finishing in second place and only 0.44 points behind Gilles/Poirier. Chock remarked, "based on how the season has been so far, we are just really proud of how much work we accomplished in such a short amount of time." They were second in the free dance as well, finishing 3.70 points behind Gilles/Poirier and winning their fourth Grand Prix Final silver, which Chock called "everything we hoped it would be for where we have been and the amount of work we’ve put in since Skate America and NHK."

Heavy favourites going into the 2023 U.S. Championships, Chock/Bates successfully defended their title, winning a second consecutive and fourth overall national gold medal together.

With rivals Gilles/Poirier absent from the 2023 Four Continents Championships due to Gilles' requiring an appendectomy, Chock/Bates entered the event as heavy favourites for their third title. They won the rhythm dance with a personal best 87.67, albeit with second-place Fournier Beaudry/Sørensen unexpectedly close behind with 86.28. They won the free dance by a wider margin of over five points, taking the gold medal again and setting new personal bests in the segment and overall. Bates reflected on their victories at Four Continents, saying "the first time we were very surprised we won. The second time we won, we didn't skate our best. And today, I think, was the right mix of feeling really prepared, skating really well, and still being surprised."

Going into the 2023 World Championships, Chock/Bates were perceived to have reestablished themselves as the title frontrunners, with Guignard/Fabbri and a returning Gilles/Poirier their main challengers. In the rhythm dance, they set a new personal best score of 91.94 to finish in first place in the segment, more than three points clear of the Italians in second. Despite Chock falling at the end of their free dance, they won that segment as well, setting a new personal best in that segment and overall in the process. Chock and Bates won their first World title, becoming only the second American team to do so, after Davis and White. With Guignard/Fabbri and Gilles/Poirier joining them on the podium, all the ice dance medalists were aged 30 or over for the first time in the history of the event.

Chock/Bates finished the season at the World Team Trophy, winning the rhythm dance with a new world record score. They set world records in the free dance and total score as well. Chock said she was pleased to have performed so well after the difficulties in the free dance at the World Championships. Team USA won the gold medal.

=== 2023–2024 season: Second World title and Grand Prix Final gold ===
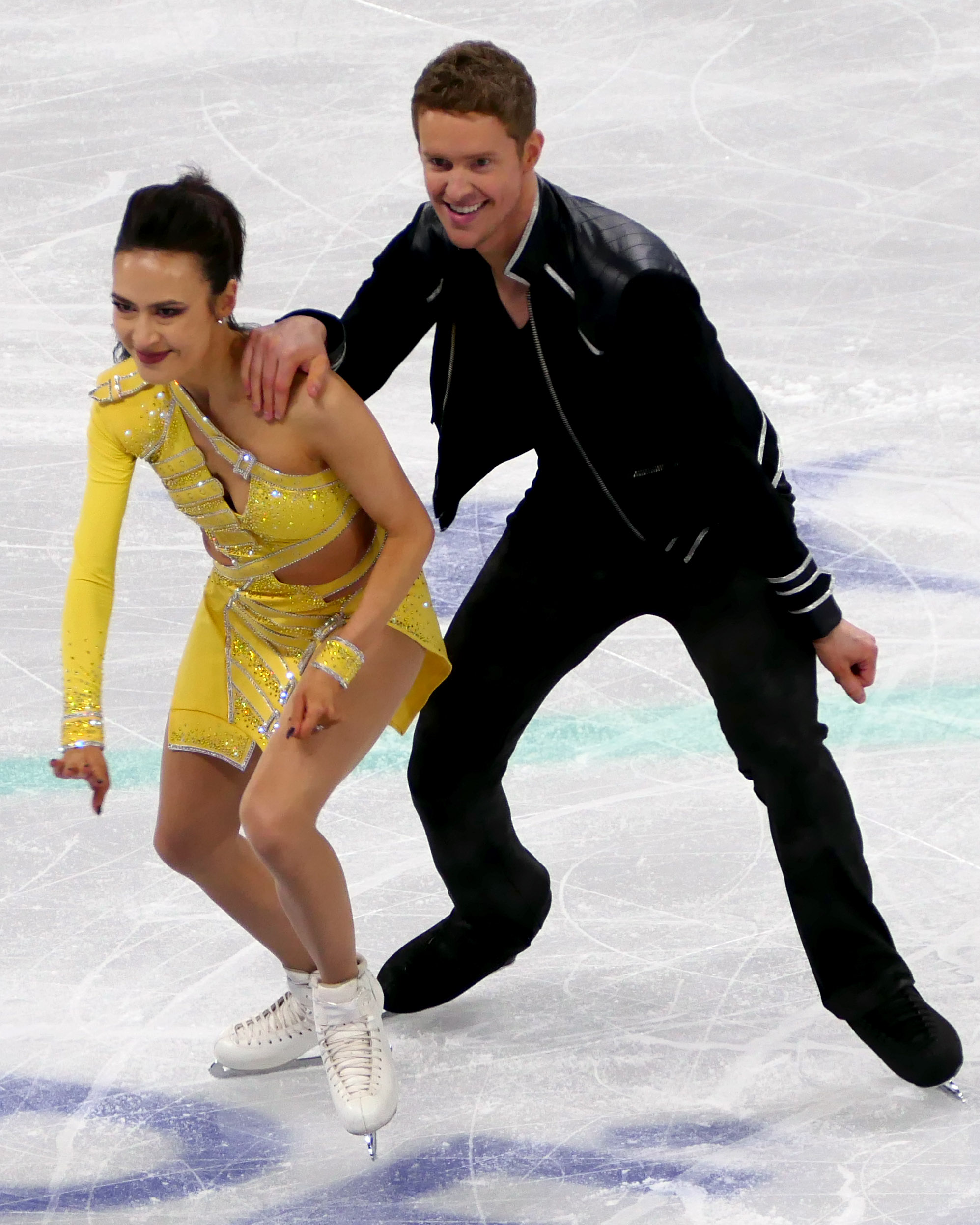
Chock/Bates during their rhythm dance at the 2024 World Championships

Skipping the Challenger circuit for a second consecutive season, Chock and Bates' first competition was a defense of their title at the 2023 Skate America. They finished first in the rhythm dance by seven points in front of Canadian training mates Lajoie/Lagha, despite having had a dangerous fall in practice the morning of the segment. They won the free dance as well, taking their fourth event title by a wide margin. They cite the fiftieth anniversary of The Dark Side of the Moon as the inspiration for their Pink Floyd medley free program. Despite twizzle errors in the free dance at the 2023 Grand Prix of Espoo, they won that event as well.

Chock/Bates qualified to the 2023–24 Grand Prix Final, their seventh appearance at the event, a record for American competitors in any discipline. They scored 89.15 in the rhythm dance, the highest score for any team to that point in the season. Winning the free dance as well, they took their first gold medal, and first Final medal of any color other than silver.

In advance of the 2024 U.S. Championships, Chock/Bates were preemptively named to the American team for the 2024 Four Continents Championships, which were to be held the following week in Shanghai. Chock began to experience flu-like symptoms in the days before the national championships. They won the rhythm dance by an 8.98-point margin over Carreira/Ponomarenko, but Chock's symptoms continued to worsen, and the decision to compete in the free dance was only firmly made shortly before their final warmup. They lost that segment to Carreira/Ponomarenko, finishing second there, but remained in first place overall. Chock/Bates subsequently withdrew from the Four Continents team, and were replaced by Zingas/Kolesnik.

The 2024 World Championships were held in Montreal, home of the team's training base. They won the rhythm dance with a score of 90.08 points, with Chock calling it their best of the season. In the free dance, they lost a level on their opening stationary lift, and ultimately finished second in that segment behind Canada's Gilles/Poirier, but remained first overall and claimed the gold medal. With this result they equaled Davis/White's record for most World titles for an American dance team, and became the first American team to win two World titles consecutively. They said they were pleased to have achieved this in their "adopted hometown."

During the 2024 Summer Olympics in Paris, a medal ceremony was held for Chock/Bates and their teammates from the 2022 Olympic team event, where they were awarded their Olympic gold medals.

=== 2024–25 season: Third consecutive World champion, second Grand Prix Final gold and Four Continents silver ===
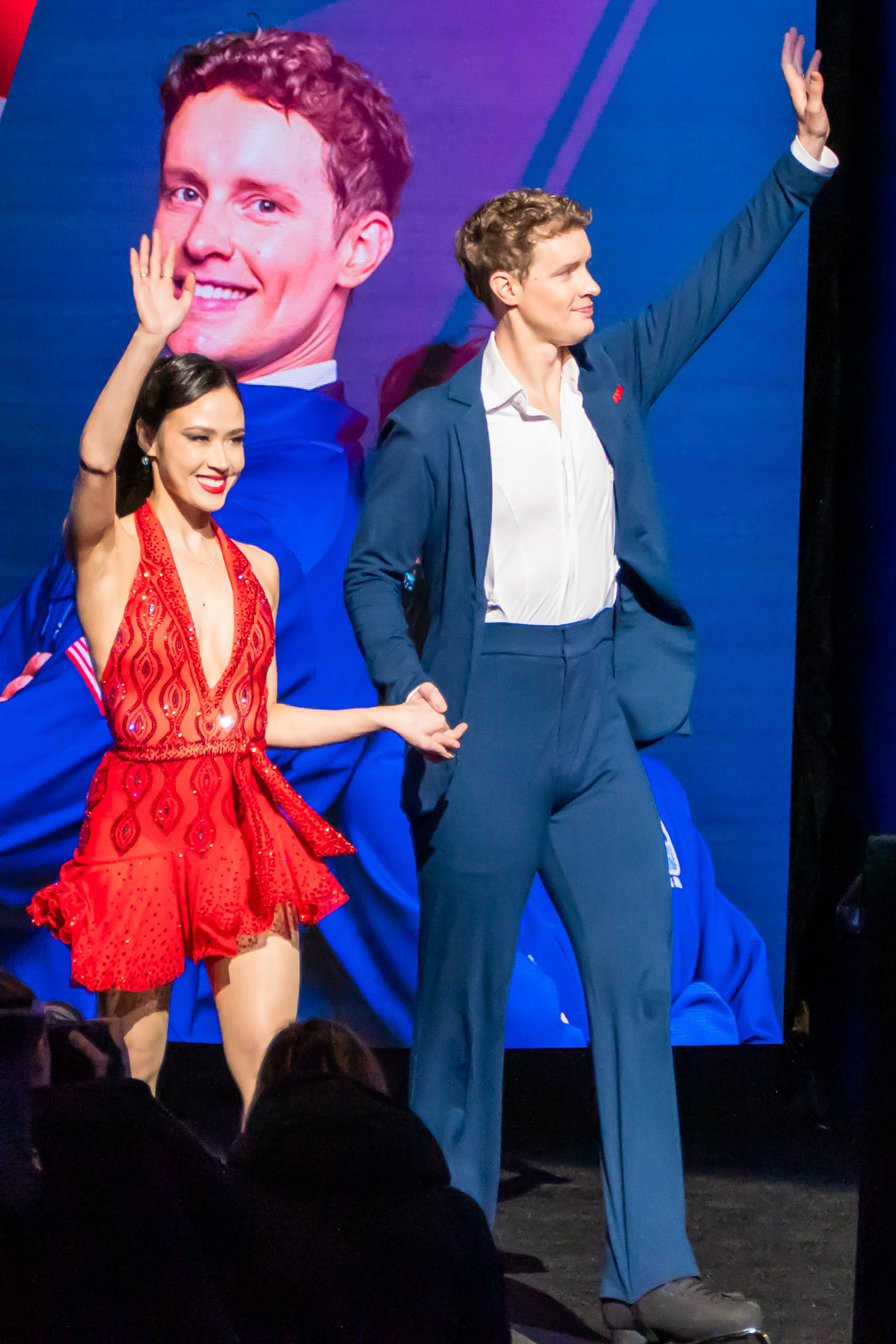
Chock and Bates at the 2025 World Championships

Again eschewing the Challenger circuit, Chock/Bates started their season on the Grand Prix at 2024 Skate America, entering the event as the heavy favourites for the gold. In the rhythm dance, Chock fell during the choreographic rhythm sequence, as a result of which the team placed second in the segment, nearly six points behind British training-mates Fear/Gibson. They went on to win the free dance, but remained in second place overall by 0.75 points. Chock/Bates fared better at their second event, taking gold at the 2024 NHK Trophy and defeating fellow Americans Carreira/Ponomarenko by a wide margin. Bates said: "Anytime the skaters are selected for NHK Trophy, we all do a little celebration because we’re so excited to come to this competition.” Their results qualified them again for the Grand Prix Final, where they won their second consecutive Final title with first-place finishes in both segments. They became the oldest dance team to win gold at the event, prompting Chock to say they were "aging like fine wine! It's truly an honor to have the longevity that we've had and be healthy and passionate about skating."

Chock and Bates defended their national title at the 2025 U.S. Championships in Wichita, despite her suffering from a stomach ailment throughout the week. The result saw them tie Meryl Davis and Charlie White's record of six senior ice dance gold medals. Bates credited his wife's performance through illness, calling her "so tough. She’s never not going to go out there and not give it her best. It took all the little energy that she had." “Winning means the world to us,” said Bates. “The U.S. Championships is always an event that we hold near and dear to our hearts. I think it’s because it’s the competition that we grew up coming to every January, watching every year on TV as kids, and it’s really like what made us fall in love with the sport. So, there’s something incredibly magical about this event, and we hold it in very hard.”

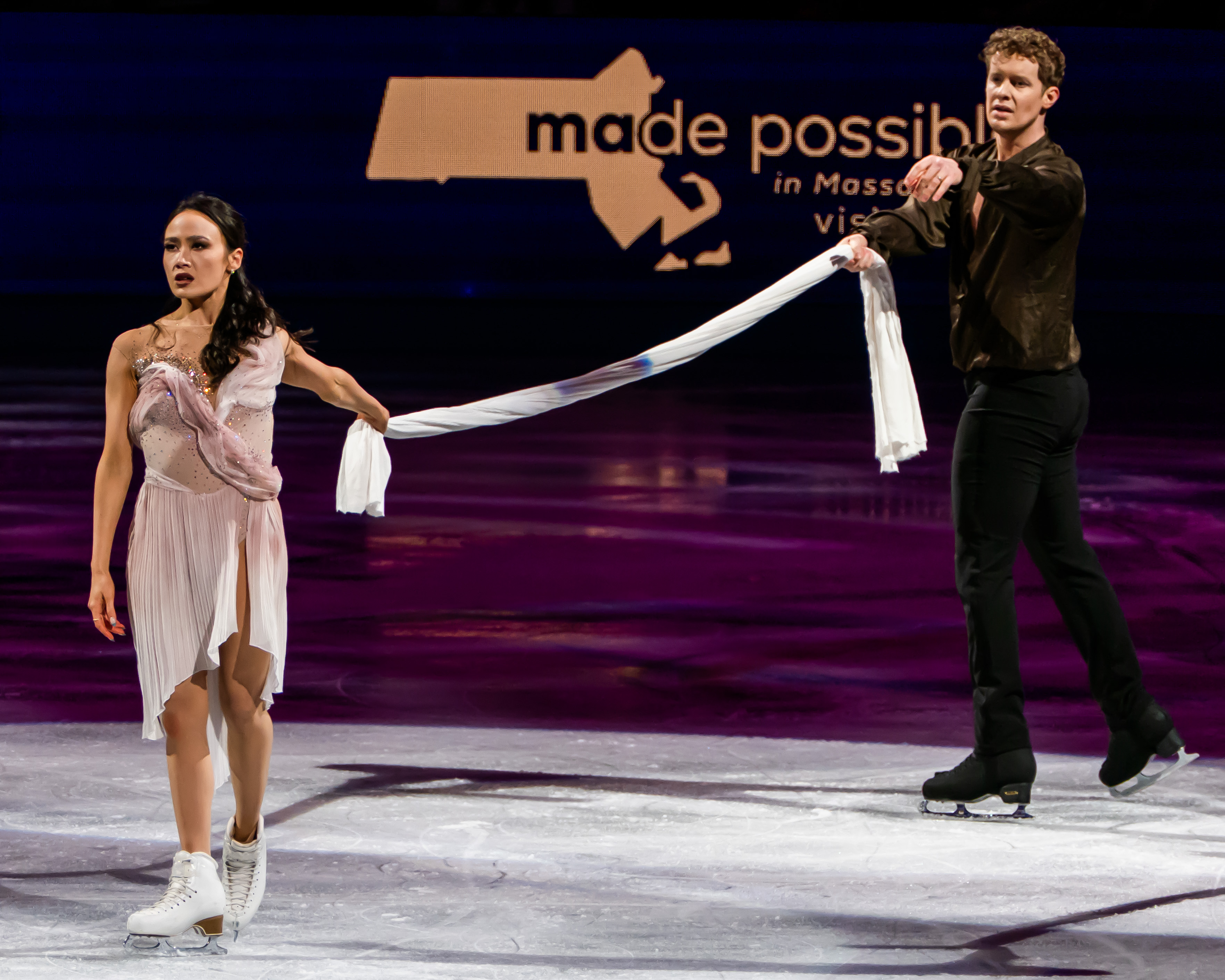
Chock and Bates during their exhibition program at the 2025 World Championships

At the 2025 Four Continents Championships in Seoul, Chock/Bates entered as the title favourites, but unexpectedly placed second in the rhythm dance, 1.01 points behind Canadian rivals Gilles/Poirier. They went on to win the free dance, but remained second overall, finishing 0.53 points behind the Canadians, and winning the silver medal. Commenting on the longevity of the two teams, Bates remarked that they had been competing against each other since they were teenagers, "half a lifetime." He said that "I think we make each other better and that's great for the sport."

Chock/Bates entered the 2025 World Championships, which were held on home soil in Boston, as strong favorites for the title. They won the rhythm dance with a score of 90.18, leading Gilles/Poirier by 3.74 points in the segment, which Poirier acknowledged as "a tough amount of points to catch up on." They went on to win the free dance as well, albeit by a narrower margin, claiming their third consecutive World title. They were the first team to win the World Championships three times in a row since Russians Grishuk/Platov, who won four gold medals from 1994 to 1997. Bates opined afterward that the "last couple of world titles we had didn’t feel as good as that one. This will go right to the top of the list forever." “It means beyond words I can’t really describe,” said Bates of their gold medal, “but I’m just so grateful for the performance and the home crowd and the moment at the end. It feels a 100% better than last time.”

They were selected to compete for Team United States at the 2025 World Team Trophy, Chock/Bates won all segments of the ice dance event, aiding Team United States in securing the gold medal overall. “I think it fosters a lot of confidence in the team," said Chock. "Coming into this event, we were already knowing that we had a lot of very, very talented skaters on the team. And after the World Championships, just seeing how well our Team USA athletes have done and can perform, it’s really impressive and an honor to witness. So, I’m excited to see how everyone will do next season.”

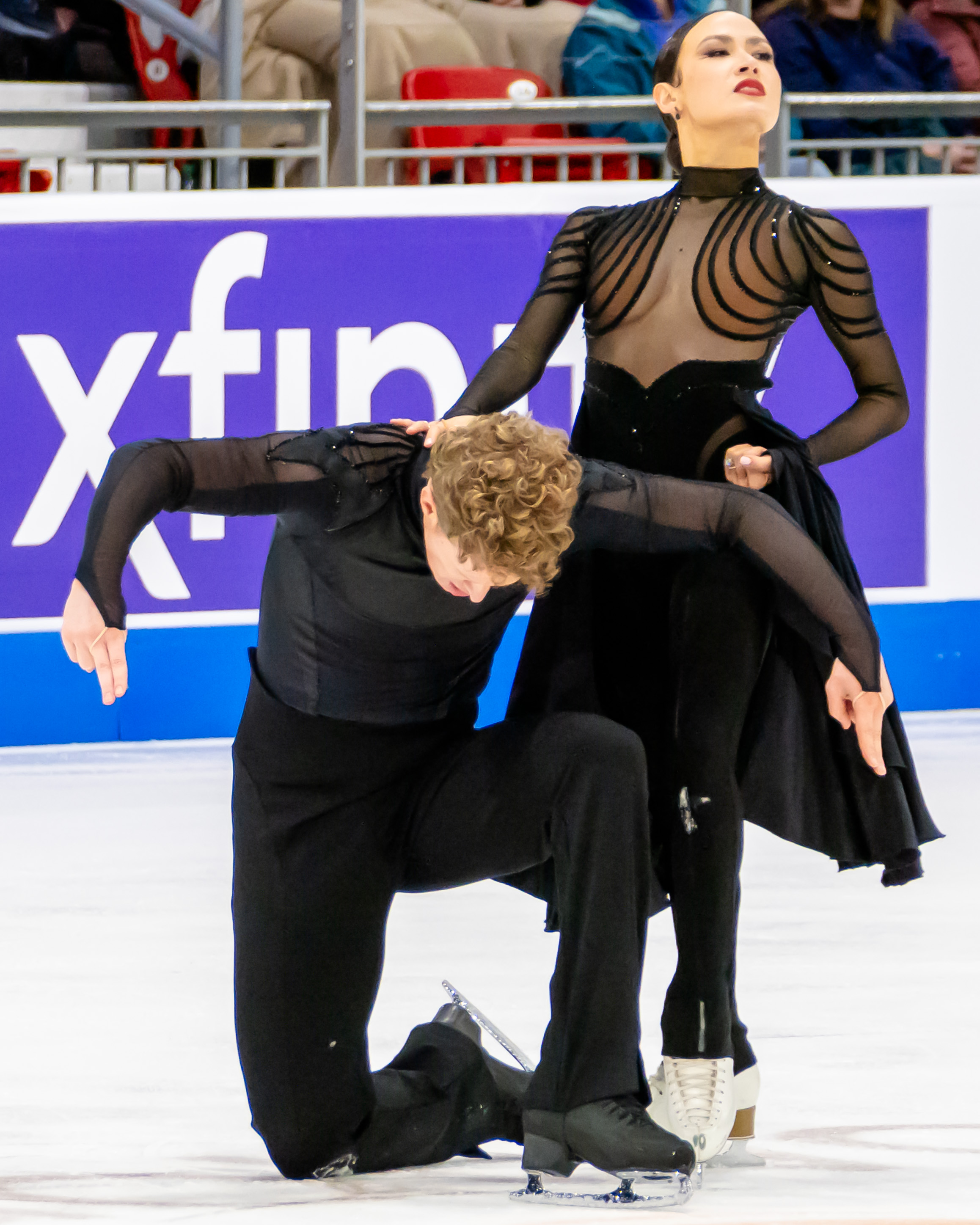
Chock and Bates during their free dance at 2025 Skate America

=== 2025–26 season: Milano Cortina Olympic team gold, Olympic ice dance silver and third consecutive Grand Prix Final gold ===
Chock/Bates opened their season at 2025 Cup of China where they took their eighth individual Grand Prix gold medal. "We feel like this was a great start to our season and we're excited to get back home and bring more work before Skate America," said Chock.

The following month, the won their fifth Skate America title at 2025 Skate America with a new season's best score, and qualified for the 2025-26 Grand Prix Final. “It’s so special for us every time we get to compete on home ice, and Skate America is a very near and dear competition to our hearts,” said Chock. “We’ve been doing it for many years, and I’ve always admired it in my entire career."

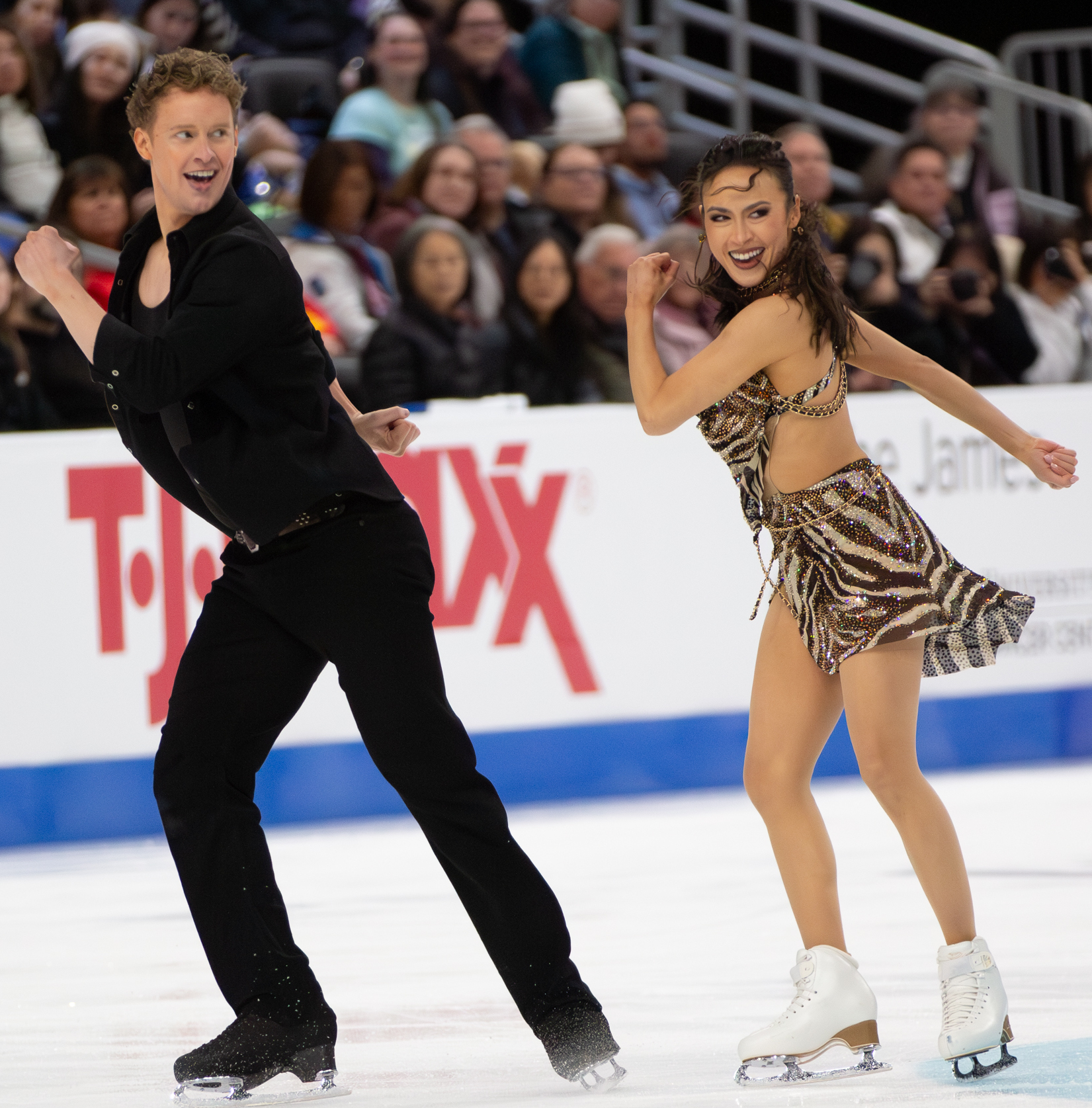
Chock and Bates during their rhythm dance at the 2026 U.S. Championships

In December, Chock/Bates won their third consecutive Grand Prix Final at the 2025–26 Grand Prix Final in Nagoya, Japan. They finished first in both the Rhythm Dance and Free Dance with new season best scores. "This is just a great step forward into the second half of the season, and we're honored to just be here and be a part of it," said Chock after the Free Dance. "And we really look forward to how we can keep progressing through the second half of the season."

The following month, they won their seventh national title at the 2026 U.S. Championships. “Seven-time national champion,” said Chock in awe. “Seems surreal. I remember growing up and looking up to Tanith (Belbin) and Ben (Agosto) and Meryl (Davis) and Charlie (White) and just idolizing them and just what they embodied for ice dance and encompassed." They were subsequently named to the 2026 Winter Olympic team. “It’s going to be a lot more what it has been,” Chock said of the team's approach to training in the short weeks before the Olympic Games. “We know what to do. We have our plan, and we’re executing it, and we don’t plan on deviating from it. We’re going to stick to it, trust ourselves, trust our team, and do what we know how to do, which is prepare and execute.”

On February 6, Chock and Bates competed their Rhythm Dance in the 2026 Winter Olympics Figure Skating Team Event where they placed first with a new season's best score of 91.06. "I'm really happy to be able to put out this performance for them as a team," said Chock. "Overall, every event is different, and it will be judged according to the day. So, today’s today and tomorrow is going to be tomorrow." The following day, they earned another season's best (133.23) for their Free Dance in Day 2 of the 2026 Winter Olympics Figure Skating Team Event. "I think it's a progression," said Bates of their season's best score. "Each time we step out, we are competing with ourselves. It's very cliché, but it is our mindset, it is our approach, and it's how we have stayed focused, and it's how we’ve been training."

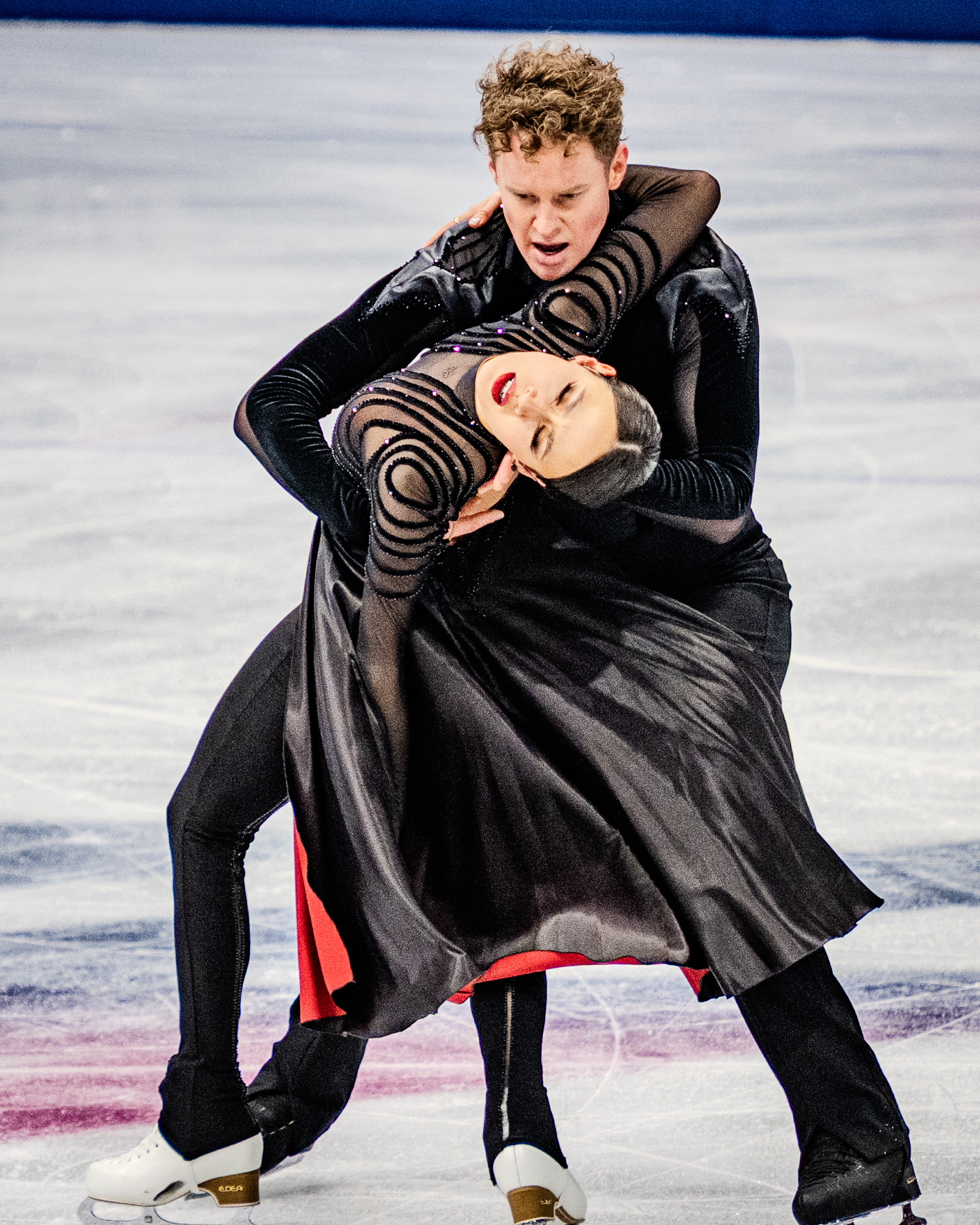
Chock and Bates during a practice session at the 2026 Winter Olympics

Four days later, Chock and Bates took the silver medal in the 2026 Winter Olympics Ice Dance event after placing a close second in both segments, only 1.34 points behind gold medalists, Laurence Fournier Beaudry and Guillaume Cizeron. "It's definitely a bittersweet feeling at the moment," said Chock. "We really gave it our all, and I wouldn't change anything about how we approached each performance, what we delivered in each performance. I'm really proud of how we've handled ourselves and what we've accomplished here." "We just performed four times in six days at the Olympics," added Bates. "We've never done anything like it, and it took so much mental strength and discipline to stay focused over the last six days and to deliver four great performances. At the end of the fourth one, the emotions just came flooding out because it’s just a lot." This final ice dance result sparked widespread controversy with several media outlets expressing outrage. Many noted that the French judge, Jézabel Dabouis, scored Chock and Bates lower than any other evaluator, nearly eight points lower than Fournier Beaudry and Cizeron in the free dance segment. She was also the only evaluator to give Chock and Bates a score lower than 130 points and one that was over 5.20 points below the average score posted by the remaining eight judges. Additionally, it was highlighted that Cizeron made several mistakes, including a noticeable one during his twizzle sequence, while Chock and Bates were nearly perfect. Skating fans also created a petition on Change.org, demanding an immediate and independent investigation by the International Olympic Committee (IOC) and the International Skating Union (ISU) which garnered 6,500 signatures within less than twenty four hours following the event.

In response to the backlash, an ISU spokesperson said, "It is normal for there to be a range of scores given by different judges in any panel and a number of mechanisms are used to mitigate these variations. The ISU has full confidence in the scores given and remains completely committed to fairness."

Several figure skaters expressed their belief that Chock and Bates should have won the Olympic gold including Emilea Zingas, Vadym Kolesnik, Charlène Guignard, Marco Fabbri, Christina Carreira, Anthony Ponomarenko, Amber Glenn, Ellie Kam, Nathan Chen, and Evan Lysacek.

USA Today sports columnist, Christine Brennan, referred to Fournier Beaudry and Cizeron's win as "an awful message [...] to sexual abuse survivors and victims, and parents who want their children to participate in a safe sport," citing that the reason the French ice dance team was formed was because of the investigation and subsequent suspension of Fournier Beaudry's former ice dance partner and boyfriend, Nikolaj Sørensen, for allegedly sexually assaulting another figure skater. Despite this, Fournier Beaudry and Cizeron have consistently and publicly supported Sørensen with him even attending the Olympic ice dance event to support the team.

Bates, along with hockey player Hilary Knight, was selected as flag bearers for the United States during the Olympic closing ceremony.

== Show skating ==
Chock and Bates have participated in shows such as Stars on Ice Japan (2022–2026), Stars On Ice U.S. Tour (2016–2017, 2022–2023, 2025–2026), Stars on Ice Canada (2023), and THE ICE in Japan (2022–2024). Madison Chock and Evan Bates participated in the tribute show "Legacy on Ice" on March 2, 2025, benefitting victims of the Potomac River mid-air collision. In February 2026, Chock/Bates made their first appearance on the show Art on Ice.

== Public life ==
=== Sponsorships, endorsements and partnerships ===
Heading into the 2026 Winter Olympics in Milan Cortina, Chock and Bates partnered with Nulo Pet Food, Coca-Cola, Ralph Lauren, Topps, and Honda.

== Honors and awards ==
- ISU Skating Awards 2020: Best Costume
- ISU Skating Awards 2023: Best Costume
- Four-time winners of the Edi Award from the Professional Skaters Association for outstanding ice dance performance at US Nationals
- ISU Skating Awards 2025: Skaters of the Year

== World record scores ==
Combined total records
| Date | Score | Segment | Event | Ref. |
|---|---|---|---|---|
| April 13, 2023 | 93.91 | Rhythm dance | 2023 ISU World Team Trophy | |
| April 14, 2023 | 138.41 | Free dance | 2023 ISU World Team Trophy | |
| April 14, 2023 | 232.32 | Combined total | 2023 ISU World Team Trophy | |

== Programs ==
=== Ice dance with Madison Chock ===
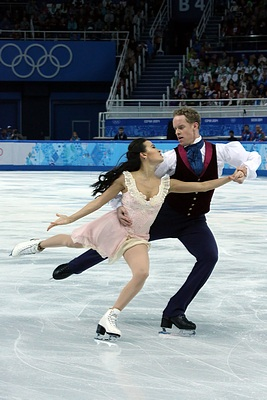
Free dance at 2014 Winter Olympics

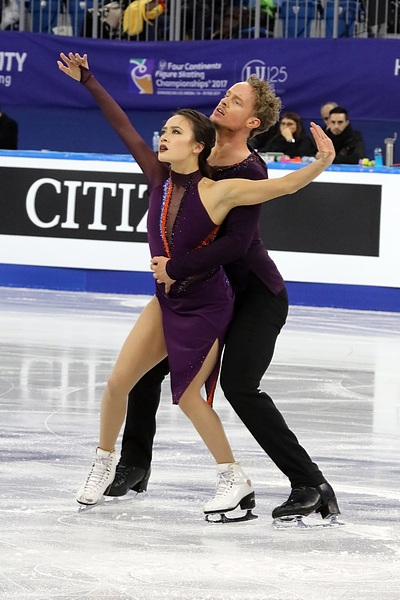
Chock/Bates at the 2017 Four Continents

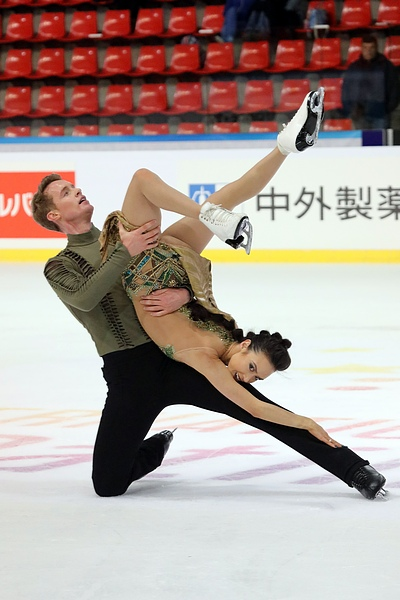
Snake Dance at 2019 Internationaux de France

| Season | Short dance | Free dance | Exhibition |
|---|---|---|---|
| 2011–2012 | Samba: Chick Chick Boom; Rhumba: Boom Diggy Diggy | Prelude in E minor by Frédéric Chopin | Samba: Chick Chick Boom; Rhumba: Boom Diggy Diggy |
| 2012–2013 | Waltz and Polka: Quidam by Cirque du Soleil | Doctor Zhivago by Maurice Jarre | Sorry Seems To Be The Hardest Word by Elton John |
| 2013–2014 | Quickstep: Hollywood by The Puppini Sisters; Foxtrot: There's No Business Like Show Business (from Annie Get Your Gun) by Irving Berlin | Les Misérables by Claude-Michel Schönberg | Young and Beautiful by Lana Del Rey |
| 2014–2015 | Don Quixote by Ludwig Minkus | An American in Paris by George Gershwin | Interrupted Flight by Vladimir Vysotsky; Sorry Seems To Be The Hardest Word by Elton John |
| 2015–2016 | Foxtrot: More from Concerto: One Night in Central Park by Andrea Bocelli; Waltz: Unchained Melody covered by Il Divo; Waltz and Polka: Dark Eyes performed by André Rieu and the Johann Strauss Orchestra | Piano Concerto No. 2 Adagio Allegro by Sergei Rachmaninoff | Everybody's Free (to Wear Sunscreen) by Baz Luhrmann choreo. by Christopher Dean; Haunted by Beyoncé choreo. by Rohene Ward; Rise Up by Andra Day |
| 2016–2017 | Blues: Bad to the Bone by George Thorogood; Hip Hop: Uptown Funk by Mark Ronson featuring Bruno Mars choreo. by Rohene Ward | Under Pressure by David Bowie, Queen choreo. by Christopher Dean | Under Pressure by David Bowie, Queen choreo. by Christopher Dean; Tango (Santa María) by Gotan Project; Everybody's Free (to Wear Sunscreen) by Baz Luhrmann choreo. by Christopher Dean; Haunted by Beyoncé choreo. by Rohene Ward |
| 2017–2018 | Salsa: Aguanile; Rumba: Qué Lío; Samba: Vivir Mi Vida performed by Marc Anthony | Imagine (mix) by John Lennon arranged by Sonia Lee additional performance by Olivia Millerschin choreo. by Christopher Dean | Santa María by Gotan Project |
| | Rhythm dance | Free dance | Exhibition |
| 2018–2019 | Flamenco: Dinner; Tango: Assassin's Tango by John Powell choreo. by Marie-France Dubreuil | Fever performed by Elvis Presley, Michael Bublé; Burning Love performed by Elvis Presley choreo. by Marie-France Dubreuil | Haunted by Beyoncé choreo. by Rohene Ward |
| 2019–2021 | Blues: Too Darn Hot; Quickstep: Too Darn Hot; Swing: Too Darn Hot by Cole Porter choreo. by Marie-France Dubreuil, Sam Chouinard | Egyptian Snake Dance: Yearning by Raul Ferrando; Sahara Nights by DJ Quincy Ortz; Layali Al Sharq performed by Al-Ahram Orchestra choreo. by Marie-France Dubreuil, Sam Chouinard | These Boots Are Made for Walkin' by Nancy Sinatra choreo. by Christopher Dean |
| 2021–2022 | Blues: My Boy; Therefore I Am; Hip Hop: Bad Guy by Billie Eilish choreo. by Marie-France Dubreuil | Contact; Touch; Within by Daft Punk choreo. by Marie-France Dubreuil, Ginette Cournoyer, Samuel Chouinard | I Hear a Symphony by Cody Fry; Contact; Touch; Within by Daft Punk choreo. by Marie-France Dubreuil, Ginette Cournoyer, Samuel Chouinard |
| 2022–2023 | Samba: Let's Dance; Rhumba: Let's Dance; Samba: Let's Dance by David Bowie remix by Ben Liebrand | Souffrance by Orange Blossom; Les Tectoniques by Jorane; Film III; Les Tectoniques; Fem III by Jorane | Nightcall by Kavinsky performed by London Grammar choreo. by Guillaume Cizeron; Let's Dance by David Bowie remix by Ben Liebrand |
| 2023–2024 | Another One Bites the Dust; Who Wants to Live Forever; I Want It All by Queen choreo. by Marie-France Dubreuil | Time; Breathe; Eclipse by Pink Floyd choreo. by Marie-France Dubreuil | Nightcall by Kavinsky performed by London Grammar choreo. by Guillaume Cizeron; Another One Bites the Dust; Who Wants to Live Forever; I Want It All by Queen choreo. by Marie-France Dubreuil; Once I Was Loved by Melody Gardot |
| 2024–2025 | Hawaii Five-O; Let's Twist Again; Rock Around the Clock by Jive Bunny and the Mastermixers; The Madison; Watusi With Lucy by The Dovells; Nitty Gritty by Skeewiff; Stayin' Alive by Bee Gees; Car Wash by Rose Royce; Blame It on the Boogie by The Jacksons; Y.M.C.A. by Village People; Last Dance by Donna Summer choreo. by Marie-France Dubreuil, Samuel Chouinard, Massimo Scali; Hawaii Five-O; Let's Twist Again; Rock Around the Clock by Jive Bunny and the Mastermixers; Stayin' Alive by Bee Gees; Car Wash by Rose Royce; Blame It on the Boogie by The Jacksons; Y.M.C.A. by Village People; Last Dance by Donna Summer choreo. by Marie-France Dubreuil, Samuel Chouinard, Massimo Scali | Take Five by Dave Brubeck performed by Juju choreo. by Marie-France Dubreuil, Samuel Chouinard, Massimo Scali; 'Round About Midnight by Thelonious Monk performed by Miles Davis; Take Five by Dave Brubeck; Take Five performed by Juju choreo. by Marie-France Dubreuil, Samuel Chouinard, Massimo Scali | Once I Was Loved by Melody Gardot; Beautiful Things by Benson Boone |
| 2025–2026 | American Woman by The Guess Who performed by Lenny Kravitz; Fly Away by Lenny Kravitz & Quavo; Always on the Run by Lenny Kravitz; Are You Gonna Go My Way by Lenny Kravitz & PH Electro choreo. by Samuel Chouinard, Marie France Dubreuil | Paint It Black (from Westworld) performed by Ramin Djawadi choreo. by Antonio Najarro, Marie France Dubreuil | Once I Was Loved by Melody Gardot |

=== Ice dance with Emily Samuelson ===
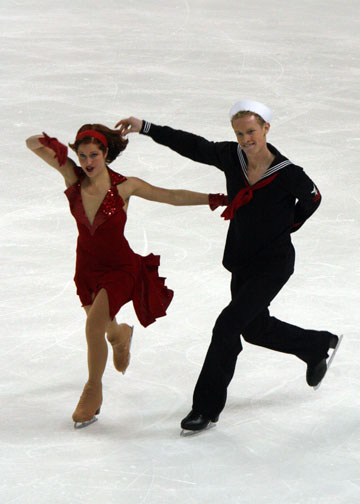
Samuelson and Bates perform their original dance at the 2008 Skate America.

| Season | Original dance | Free dance | Exhibition |
|---|---|---|---|
| 2001–2002 | | Let's Face the Music and Dance | |
| 2002–2003 | | Russian medley | |
| 2003–2004 | | Canned Heat Disco by Jamiroquai | |
| 2004–2005 | | Amore; Maria by Ricky Martin | |
| 2005–2006 | Besame by Andres Ballinas; Perfidia by Alberto Dominguez | Jingi by Toskiaki Tsushima; Battle Without Honor or Humanity (from Kill Bill) by Tomoyasu Hotei | |
| 2006–2007 | Quejas de Bandoneom | Thalia's Hits Remixed | |
| 2007–2008 | Kalinka; Russkie Napievi by Balalaika | Luna by Alessandro Safina | Bittersweet by Apocalyptica |
| 2008–2009 | Let Yourself Go by Irving Berlin | Amazonic by Tonči Huljić performed by Maksim Mrvica | You Should Be Dancing by the Bee Gees; Bittersweet by Apocalyptica |
| 2009–2010 | The Chicks medley | Canto della Terra by Francesco Sartori performed by Sarah Brightman, Andrea Bocelli | |
| 2010–2011 | Desde el Alma | An American in Paris by George Gershwin | |

== Competitive highlights ==
- GP – Event of the ISU Grand Prix Series
- JGP – Event of the ISU Junior Grand Prix Series
- CS – Event of the ISU Challenger Series
- TBD – Assigned
- WD – Withdrew from competition
- C – Event was cancelled
- Medals at team events are awarded for the team results only. Individual placements at team events are listed in parentheses.

=== Ice dance with Madison Chock ===
Competition placements at senior level
| Season | 2011–12 | 2012–13 | 2013–14 | 2014–15 | 2015–16 | 2016–17 | 2017–18 | 2018–19 | 2019–20 | 2020–21 | 2021–22 | 2022–23 | 2023–24 | 2024–25 | 2025–26 |
|---|---|---|---|---|---|---|---|---|---|---|---|---|---|---|---|
| Winter Olympics | | | 8th | | | | 9th | | | | 4th | | | | 2nd |
| Winter Olympics (Team event) | | | | | | | | | | | 1st | | | | 1st |
| World Championships | | 7th | 5th | 2nd | 3rd | 7th | 5th | 6th | C | 4th | 3rd | 1st | 1st | 1st | |
| Four Continents Championships | | 3rd | | 2nd | 2nd | 3rd | | 1st | 1st | | | 1st | | 2nd | |
| Grand Prix Final | | | | 2nd | 2nd | 6th | 5th | | 2nd | | C | 2nd | 1st | 1st | 1st |
| U.S. Championships | 5th | 2nd | 2nd | 1st | 2nd | 2nd | 3rd | 2nd | 1st | 2nd | 1st | 1st | 1st | 1st | 1st |
| World Team Trophy | | 1st (1st) | | 1st (3rd) | | 3rd (2nd) | | | | | | 1st (1st) | | 1st (1st) | |
| GP Cup of China | | 4th | 3rd | | 2nd | | 2nd | | 2nd | | | | | | 1st |
| GP Finland | | | | | | | | | | | | | 1st | | |
| GP France | 5th | | | | | | 2nd | | 2nd | | | | | | |
| GP NHK Trophy | | | | | | | | | | | 2nd | 2nd | | 1st | |
| GP Rostelecom Cup | | | 3rd | 1st | | 2nd | | | | | | | | | |
| GP Skate America | | | | 1st | 1st | | | | | | 2nd | 1st | 1st | 2nd | 1st |
| GP Skate Canada | 4th | | | | | 2nd | | | | | | | | | |
| CS Finlandia Trophy | 3rd | | 2nd | | | | | | 1st | | 2nd | | | | |
| CS Nebelhorn Trophy | | 1st | | 2nd | 1st | 2nd | | | | | | | | | |
| CS Nepela Trophy | | | | | | 2nd | | | | | | | | | |
| CS U.S. Classic | | 4th | | | | | | | 1st | | | | | | |
| Mentor Toruń Cup | | | | | | | | 1st | | | | | | | |
| Team Challenge Cup | | | | | 1st (2nd) | | | | | | | | | | |

=== Ice dance with Emily Samuelson ===
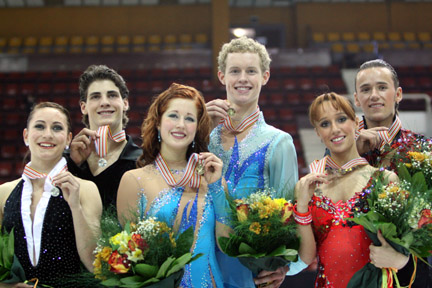
Samuelson and Bates (center) at the 2008 World Junior Championships

Competition placements at junior level
| Season | 2005–06 | 2006–07 | 2007–08 |
|---|---|---|---|
| World Junior Championships | 10th | WD | 1st |
| Junior Grand Prix Final | | 2nd | 2nd |
| U.S. Championships | 2nd | 1st | |
| JGP Austria | | | 1st |
| JGP Bulgaria | 5th | | |
| JGP Chinese Taipei | | 1st | |
| JGP Mexico | | 1st | |
| JGP Slovakia | 8th | | |
| JGP United States | | | 1st |

Competition placements at senior level
| Season | 2007–08 | 2008–09 | 2009–10 |
|---|---|---|---|
| Winter Olympics | | | 11th |
| World Championships | | 11th | 9th |
| Four Continents Championships | | 3rd | |
| U.S. Championships | 4th | 2nd | 3rd |
| GP NHK Trophy | | 3rd | |
| GP Skate America | | 4th | |
| GP Skate Canada | | | 5th |
| GP Trophée Éric Bompard | | | 4th |
| CS Nebelhorn Trophy | | 1st | |

== Detailed results ==
=== Ice dance with Madison Chock ===
ISU personal best scores in the +5/-5 GOE System
| Segment | Type | Score | Event |
|---|---|---|---|
| Total | TSS | 232.32 | 2023 World Team Trophy |
| Rhythm dance | TSS | 93.91 | 2023 World Team Trophy |
| Rhythm dance | TES | 55.16 | 2023 World Team Trophy |
| Rhythm dance | PCS | 38.75 | 2023 World Team Trophy |
| Free dance | TSS | 138.41 | 2023 World Team Trophy |
| Free dance | TES | 79.41 | 2023 World Team Trophy |
| Free dance | PCS | 59.00 | 2023 World Team Trophy |

ISU personal best scores in the +3/-3 GOE System
| Segment | Type | Score | Event |
|---|---|---|---|
| Total | TSS | 189.01 | 2017 World Team Trophy |
| Rhythm dance | TSS | 79.05 | 2017 World Team Trophy |
| Rhythm dance | TES | 41.51 | 2017 World Team Trophy |
| Rhythm dance | PCS | 37.54 | 2017 World Team Trophy |
| Free dance | TSS | 113.31 | 2016 World Championships |
| Free dance | TES | 57.44 | 2016 Skate Canada International |
| Free dance | PCS | 56.09 | 2016 World Championships |

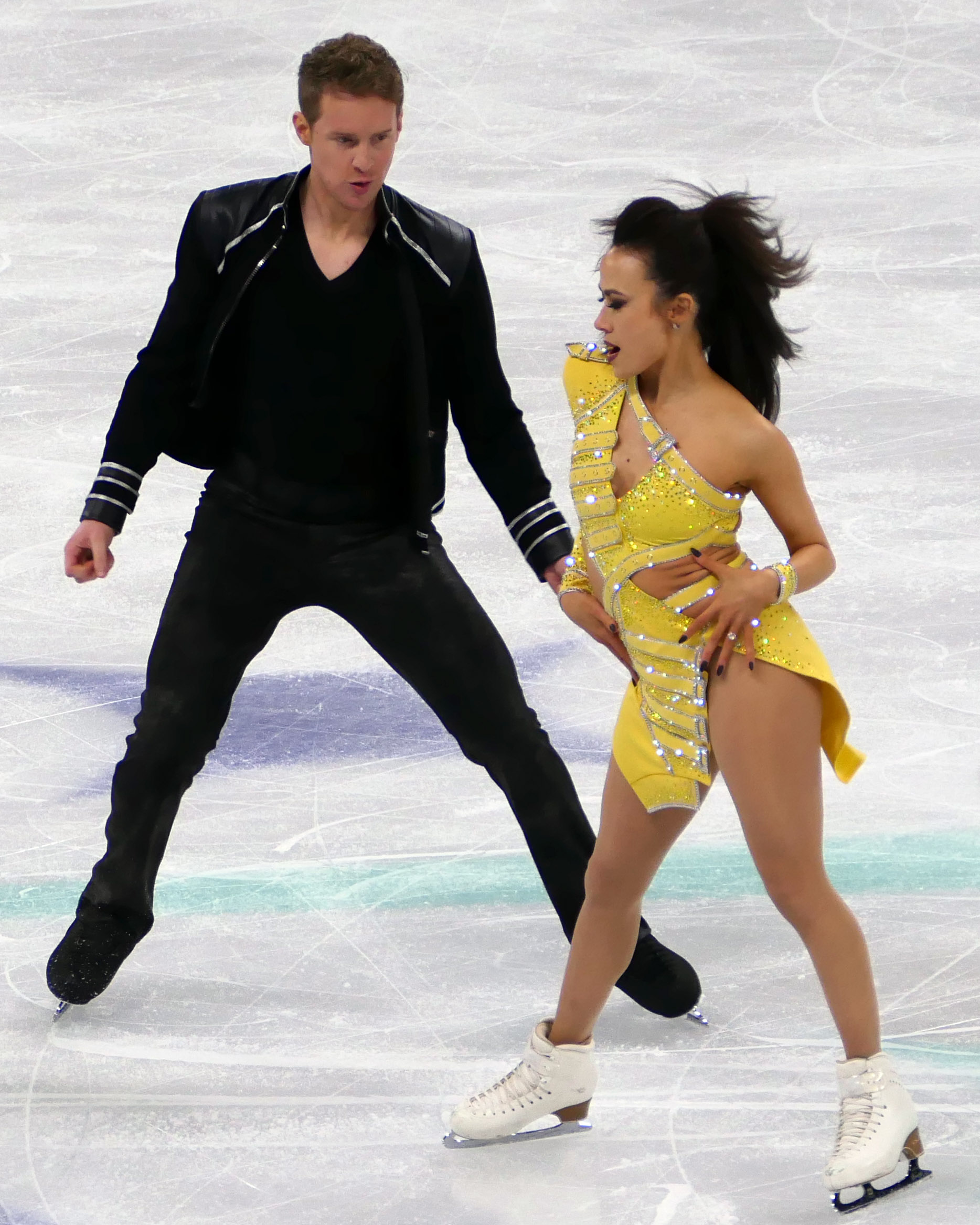
Chock and Bates at the 2024 World Championships

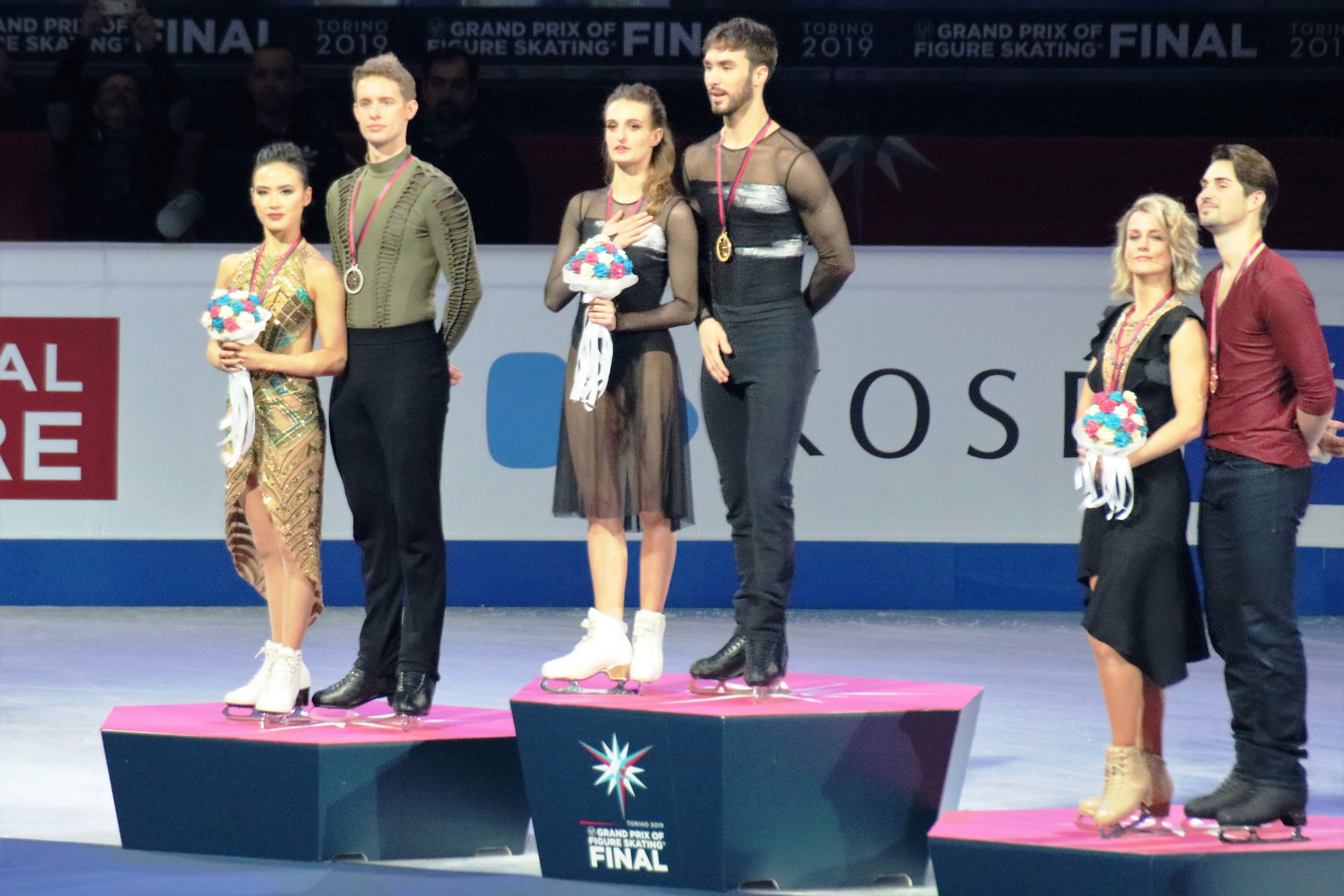
Medal ceremony at 2018–19 Grand Prix Final

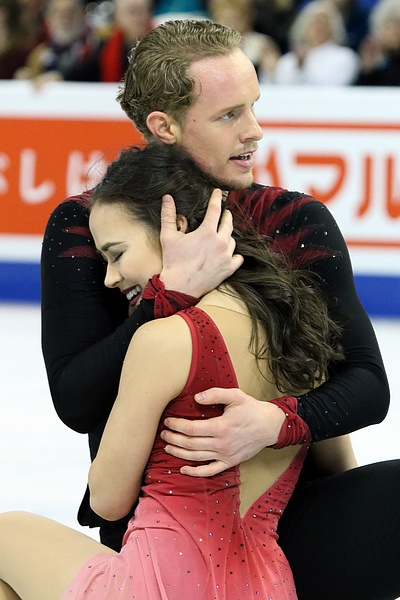
Chock and Bates at the 2016 World Championships

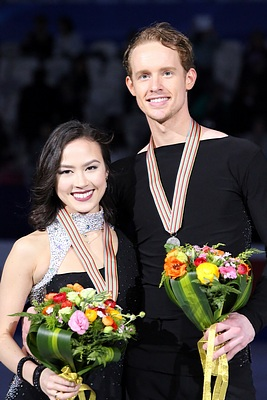
Chock and Bates at the 2015 World Championships

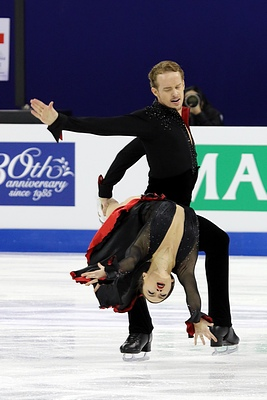
Chock and Bates at the 2015 World Championships

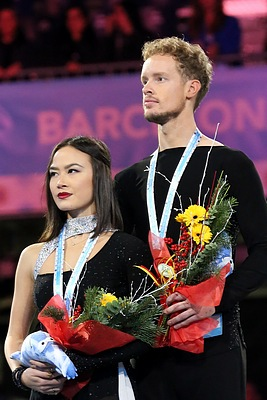
Chock and Bates at 2014–15 Grand Prix Final

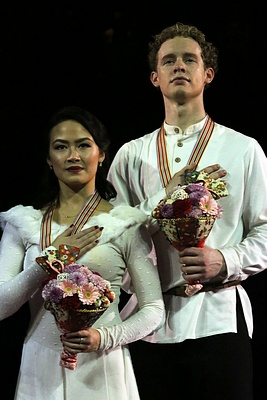
Chock and Bates at the 2013 Four Continents Championships

- Small medals for the short program and free skating are only awarded at ISU Championships.
- Medals at team events are awarded for the team results only. Individual placements at team events are listed in parentheses.

Results in the 2011–12 season
| Date | Event | SD | | FD | | Total | |
| Date | Event | P | Score | P | Score | P | Score |
|---|---|---|---|---|---|---|---|
| Oct 6–9, 2011 | (Finland) 2011 Finlandia Trophy | 3 | 53.91 | 3 | 82.97 | 3 | 136.88 |
| Oct 27–30, 2011 | 2011 Skate Canada International | 6 | 51.24 | 4 | 84.67 | 4 | 135.10 |
| Nov 17–20, 2011 | (France) 2011 Trophée Éric Bompard | 5 | 52.01 | 5 | 78.93 | 5 | 130.94 |
| Jan 22–29, 2012 | (United States) 2012 U.S. Championships | 5 | 55.49 | 5 | 89.59 | 5 | 145.08 |

Results in the 2012–13 season
| Date | Event | SD | | FD | | Total | |
| Date | Event | P | Score | P | Score | P | Score |
|---|---|---|---|---|---|---|---|
| Sep 13–15, 2012 | (United States) 2012 U.S. International Classic | 1 | 62.89 | 5 | 76.95 | 4 | 139.84 |
| Sep 27–29, 2012 | (Germany) 2012 Nebelhorn Trophy | 2 | 56.97 | 1 | 90.82 | 1 | 147.79 |
| Nov 2–4, 2012 | 2012 Cup of China | 4 | 59.26 | 4 | 90.28 | 4 | 149.54 |
| Jan 19–27, 2013 | (United States) 2013 U.S. Championships | 2 | 70.80 | 2 | 105.11 | 2 | 175.91 |
| Feb 8–11, 2013 | (Japan) 2013 Four Continents Championships | 3 | 65.44 | 5 | 94.98 | 3 | 160.42 |
| Mar 11–17, 2013 | (Canada) 2013 World Championships | 7 | 66.74 | 6 | 97.19 | 7 | 163.93 |
| Apr 11–14, 2013 | (Japan) 2013 World Team Trophy | 1 | 66.54 | 1 | 98.37 | 1 (1) | 164.91 |

Results in the 2013–14 season
| Date | Event | SD | | FD | | Total | |
| Date | Event | P | Score | P | Score | P | Score |
|---|---|---|---|---|---|---|---|
| Oct 4–6, 2013 | (Finland) 2013 Finlandia Trophy | 2 | 53.34 | 2 | 89.72 | 2 | 143.06 |
| Nov 1–3, 2013 | 2013 Cup of China | 3 | 56.77 | 3 | 93.76 | 3 | 150.53 |
| Nov 22–24, 2013 | (Russia) 2013 Rostelecom Cup | 4 | 57.80 | 3 | 95.57 | 3 | 153.37 |
| Jan 5–12, 2014 | (United States) 2014 U.S. Championships | 2 | 73.41 | 2 | 108.03 | 2 | 181.44 |
| Feb 6–22, 2014 | (Russia) 2014 Winter Olympics | 8 | 65.46 | 8 | 99.18 | 8 | 164.44 |
| Mar 24–30, 2014 | (Japan) 2014 World Championships | 5 | 67.71 | 4 | 99.88 | 5 | 167.59 |

Results in the 2014–15 season
| Date | Event | SD | | FD | | Total | |
| Date | Event | P | Score | P | Score | P | Score |
|---|---|---|---|---|---|---|---|
| Sep 24–27, 2014 | (Germany) 2014 CS Nebelhorn Trophy | 2 | 62.80 | 1 | 100.93 | 2 | 163.73 |
| Oct 24–26, 2014 | (United States) 2014 Skate America | 1 | 68.96 | 1 | 102.07 | 1 | 171.03 |
| Nov 14–16, 2014 | (Russia) 2014 Rostelecom Cup | 1 | 68.86 | 1 | 105.42 | 1 | 174.28 |
| Dec 11–14, 2014 | (Spain) 2014–15 Grand Prix Final | 2 | 65.06 | 2 | 102.03 | 2 | 167.09 |
| Jan 18–25, 2015 | (United States) 2015 U.S. Championships | 1 | 73.95 | 1 | 111.11 | 1 | 185.06 |
| Feb 9–15, 2015 | (South Korea) 2015 Four Continents Championships | 1 | 70.38 | 2 | 105.80 | 2 | 176.18 |
| Mar 23–29, 2015 | (China) 2015 World Championships | 1 | 74.47 | 2 | 106.87 | 2 | 181.34 |
| Apr 16–19, 2015 | (Japan) 2015 World Team Trophy | 2 | 72.17 | 3 | 102.24 | 1 (3) | 174.41 |

Results in the 2015–16 season
| Date | Event | SD | | FD | | Total | |
| Date | Event | P | Score | P | Score | P | Score |
|---|---|---|---|---|---|---|---|
| Sep 24–26, 2015 | (Germany) 2015 CS Nebelhorn Trophy | 1 | 67.74 | 1 | 101.76 | 1 | 169.50 |
| Oct 23–25, 2015 | (United States) 2015 Skate America | 1 | 70.56 | 1 | 102.66 | 1 | 173.22 |
| Nov 5–8, 2015 | 2015 Cup of China | 2 | 65.36 | 2 | 103.80 | 2 | 169.16 |
| Dec 10–13, 2015 | (Spain) 2015–16 Grand Prix Final | 2 | 71.64 | 3 | 105.91 | 2 | 177.55 |
| Jan 15–24, 2016 | (United States) 2016 U.S. Championships | 1 | 75.14 | 2 | 111.79 | 2 | 186.93 |
| Feb 16–21, 2016 | (Taiwan) 2016 Four Continents Championships | 4 | 67.05 | 2 | 107.59 | 2 | 174.64 |
| Mar 28 – Apr 3, 2016 | (United States) 2016 World Championships | 3 | 72.46 | 3 | 113.31 | 3 | 185.77 |
| Apr 22–24, 2016 | (United States) 2016 Team Challenge Cup | – | – | 2 | 111.30 | 1 (2) | – |

Results in the 2016–17 season
| Date | Event | SD | | FD | | Total | |
| Date | Event | P | Score | P | Score | P | Score |
|---|---|---|---|---|---|---|---|
| Sep 22–24, 2016 | (Germany) 2016 CS Nebelhorn Trophy | 2 | 70.78 | 2 | 108.40 | 2 | 179.18 |
| Sep 30 – Oct 2, 2016 | (Slovakia) 2016 CS Ondrej Nepela Memorial | 1 | 72.72 | 2 | 98.20 | 2 | 170.92 |
| Oct 28–30, 2016 | 2016 Skate Canada International | 2 | 76.21 | 1 | 112.03 | 2 | 188.24 |
| Nov 4–6, 2016 | (Russia) 2016 Rostelecom Cup | 1 | 75.04 | 3 | 107.09 | 2 | 182.13 |
| Dec 8–11, 2016 | (France) 2016–17 Grand Prix Final | 6 | 70.87 | 4 | 108.45 | 6 | 179.32 |
| Jan 14–22, 2017 | (United States) 2017 U.S. Championships | 2 | 79.96 | 1 | 119.08 | 2 | 199.04 |
| Feb 15–19, 2017 | (South Korea) 2017 Four Continents Championships | 3 | 74.67 | 3 | 110.91 | 3 | 185.58 |
| Mar 29 – Apr 2, 2017 | (Finland) 2017 World Championships | 4 | 76.25 | 8 | 105.79 | 7 | 182.04 |
| Apr 20–23, 2017 | (Japan) 2017 World Team Trophy | 1 | 79.05 | 2 | 109.96 | 3 (2) | 189.01 |

Results in the 2017–18 season
| Date | Event | SD | | FD | | Total | |
| Date | Event | P | Score | P | Score | P | Score |
|---|---|---|---|---|---|---|---|
| Nov 3–5, 2017 | 2017 Cup of China | 2 | 72.66 | 2 | 111.84 | 2 | 184.50 |
| Nov 17–19, 2017 | 2017 Internationaux de France | 2 | 73.55 | 2 | 108.30 | 2 | 181.85 |
| Dec 7–10, 2017 | (Japan) 2017–18 Grand Prix Final | 5 | 74.36 | 3 | 112.79 | 5 | 187.15 |
| Jan 5–7, 2017 | (United States) 2018 U.S. Championships | 3 | 77.61 | 1 | 118.99 | 3 | 196.60 |
| Feb 19–20, 2018 | (South Korea) 2018 Winter Olympics | 7 | 75.45 | 12 | 100.13 | 9 | 175.58 |
| Mar 19–25, 2018 | (Italy) 2018 World Championships | 5 | 75.66 | 5 | 111.62 | 5 | 187.28 |

Results in the 2018–19 season
| Date | Event | RD | | FD | | Total | |
| Date | Event | P | Score | P | Score | P | Score |
|---|---|---|---|---|---|---|---|
| Jan 8–13, 2019 | (Poland) 2019 Mentor Cup | 1 | 75.30 | 1 | 122.12 | 1 | 197.42 |
| Jan 19–27, 2019 | (United States) 2019 U.S. Championships | 2 | 82.33 | 2 | 129.19 | 2 | 211.52 |
| Feb 7–10, 2019 | (United States) 2019 Four Continents Championships | 2 | 81.17 | 1 | 126.25 | 1 | 207.42 |
| Mar 18–24, 2019 | (Japan) 2019 World Championships | 6 | 82.32 | 6 | 122.60 | 6 | 204.92 |

Results in the 2019–20 season
| Date | Event | RD | | FD | | Total | |
| Date | Event | P | Score | P | Score | P | Score |
|---|---|---|---|---|---|---|---|
| Sep 17–22, 2019 | (United States) 2019 CS U.S. International Classic | 1 | 80.18 | 1 | 122.22 | 1 | 202.40 |
| Oct 11–13, 2019 | (Finland) 2019 CS Finlandia Trophy | 1 | 78.80 | 1 | 119.46 | 1 | 198.26 |
| Nov 1–3, 2019 | 2019 Internationaux de France | 2 | 80.69 | 2 | 124.15 | 2 | 204.84 |
| Nov 8–10, 2019 | 2019 Cup of China | 2 | 80.34 | 1 | 128.21 | 2 | 208.55 |
| Dec 5–8, 2019 | (Italy) 2019–20 Grand Prix Final | 3 | 81.67 | 2 | 129.01 | 2 | 210.68 |
| Jan 20–26, 2020 | (United States) 2020 U.S. Championships | 1 | 87.63 | 1 | 134.23 | 1 | 221.86 |
| Feb 4–9, 2020 | (South Korea) 2020 Four Continents Championships | 2 | 85.76 | 1 | 127.42 | 1 | 213.18 |

Results in the 2020–21 season
| Date | Event | RD | | FD | | Total | |
| Date | Event | P | Score | P | Score | P | Score |
|---|---|---|---|---|---|---|---|
| Jan 11–21, 2021 | (United States) 2021 U.S. Championships | 1 | 90.10 | 2 | 132.83 | 2 | 222.93 |
| Mar 22–28, 2021 | (Sweden) 2021 World Championships | 3 | 85.15 | 4 | 127.54 | 4 | 212.69 |

Results in the 2021–22 season
| Date | Event | RD | | FD | | Total | |
| Date | Event | P | Score | P | Score | P | Score |
|---|---|---|---|---|---|---|---|
| Oct 7–10, 2021 | (Finland) 2021 CS Finlandia Trophy | 2 | 83.72 | 2 | 124.59 | 2 | 208.31 |
| Oct 22–24, 2021 | (United States) 2021 Skate America | 2 | 82.55 | 2 | 125.68 | 2 | 208.23 |
| Nov 12–14, 2021 | (Japan) 2021 NHK Trophy | 2 | 86.02 | 2 | 124.76 | 2 | 210.78 |
| Jan 3–9, 2022 | (United States) 2022 U.S. Championships | 1 | 91.94 | 2 | 135.43 | 1 | 227.37 |
| Feb 4–7, 2022 | (China) 2022 Winter Olympics (Team event) | – | – | 1 | 129.07 | 1 | – |
| Feb 12–14, 2022 | (China) 2022 Winter Olympics | 4 | 84.14 | 4 | 130.63 | 4 | 214.77 |
| Mar 21–27, 2022 | (France) 2022 World Championships | 3 | 87.51 | 3 | 129.32 | 3 | 216.83 |

Results in the 2022–23 season
| Date | Event | RD | | FD | | Total | |
| Date | Event | P | Score | P | Score | P | Score |
|---|---|---|---|---|---|---|---|
| Oct 21–23, 2022 | (United States) 2022 Skate America | 1 | 82.63 | 2 | 120.95 | 1 | 202.80 |
| Nov 18–20, 2022 | (Japan) 2022 NHK Trophy | 2 | 85.00 | 2 | 124.13 | 2 | 209.13 |
| Dec 8–11, 2022 | (Italy) 2022–23 Grand Prix Final | 2 | 85.49 | 2 | 126.45 | 2 | 211.94 |
| Jan 23–29, 2023 | (United States) 2023 U.S. Championships | 1 | 91.90 | 1 | 137.85 | 1 | 229.75 |
| Feb 7–12, 2023 | (United States) 2023 Four Continents Championships | 1 | 87.67 | 1 | 133.14 | 1 | 220.81 |
| Mar 22–26, 2023 | (Japan) 2023 World Championships | 1 | 91.94 | 1 | 134.07 | 1 | 226.01 |
| Apr 13–16, 2023 | (Japan) 2023 World Team Trophy | 1 | 93.91 | 1 | 138.41 | 1 (1) | 232.32 |

Results in the 2023–24 season
| Date | Event | RD | | FD | | Total | |
| Date | Event | P | Score | P | Score | P | Score |
|---|---|---|---|---|---|---|---|
| Oct 20–22, 2023 | (United States) 2023 Skate America | 1 | 84.87 | 1 | 128.09 | 1 | 212.96 |
| Nov 17–19, 2023 | (Finland) 2023 Grand Prix of Espoo | 1 | 85.61 | 1 | 123.85 | 1 | 209.46 |
| Dec 7–10, 2023 | (China) 2023–24 Grand Prix Final | 1 | 89.15 | 1 | 132.46 | 1 | 221.61 |
| Jan 22–28, 2024 | (United States) 2024 U.S. Championships | 1 | 92.17 | 2 | 123.75 | 1 | 215.92 |
| Mar 18–24, 2024 | (Canada) 2024 World Championships | 1 | 90.08 | 2 | 132.12 | 1 | 222.20 |

Results in the 2024–25 season
| Date | Event | RD | | FD | | Total | |
| Date | Event | P | Score | P | Score | P | Score |
|---|---|---|---|---|---|---|---|
| Oct 18–20, 2024 | (United States) 2024 Skate America | 2 | 77.88 | 1 | 127.75 | 2 | 205.63 |
| Nov 8–10, 2024 | (Japan) 2024 NHK Trophy | 1 | 86.32 | 1 | 129.63 | 1 | 215.95 |
| Dec 5–8, 2024 | (France) 2024–25 Grand Prix Final | 1 | 87.73 | 1 | 132.12 | 1 | 219.85 |
| Jan 20–26, 2025 | (United States) 2025 U.S. Championships | 1 | 92.16 | 1 | 131.36 | 1 | 223.52 |
| Feb 19–23, 2025 | (South Korea) 2025 Four Continents Championships | 2 | 86.21 | 1 | 131.72 | 2 | 217.93 |
| Mar 25–30, 2025 | (United States) 2025 World Championships | 1 | 90.18 | 1 | 131.88 | 1 | 222.06 |
| Apr 17–20, 2025 | (Japan) 2025 World Team Trophy | 1 | 91.25 | 1 | 133.51 | 1 (1) | 224.76 |

Results in the 2025–26 season
| Date | Event | RD | | FD | | Total | |
| Date | Event | P | Score | P | Score | P | Score |
|---|---|---|---|---|---|---|---|
| Oct 24–26, 2025 | 2025 Cup of China | 1 | 84.44 | 1 | 123.81 | 1 | 208.25 |
| Nov 14–16, 2025 | (United States) 2025 Skate America | 1 | 84.77 | 1 | 127.81 | 1 | 212.58 |
| Dec 4–7, 2025 | (Japan) 2025–26 Grand Prix Final | 1 | 88.74 | 1 | 131.68 | 1 | 220.42 |
| Jan 4–11, 2026 | (United States) 2026 U.S. Championships | 1 | 91.70 | 1 | 137.17 | 1 | 228.87 |
| Feb 6–8, 2026 | (Italy) 2026 Winter Olympics – Team event | 1 | 91.06 | 1 | 133.23 | 1 | —N/a |
| Feb 6–19, 2026 | (Italy) 2026 Winter Olympics | 2 | 89.72 | 2 | 134.67 | 2 | 224.39 |

=== Ice dance with Emily Samuelson ===
==== Senior level ====
Results in the 2007–08 season
| Date | Event | CD | | OD | | FD | | Total | |
| Date | Event | P | Score | P | Score | P | Score | P | Score |
|---|---|---|---|---|---|---|---|---|---|
| Jan 20–27, 2008 | (United States) 2008 U.S. Championships | 4 | 34.00 | 4 | 57.62 | 6 | 83.54 | 4 | 175.16 |

Results in the 2008–09 season
| Date | Event | CD | | OD | | FD | | Total | |
| Date | Event | P | Score | P | Score | P | Score | P | Score |
|---|---|---|---|---|---|---|---|---|---|
| Sep 25–29, 2008 | (Germany) 2008 Nebelhorn Trophy | 2 | 34.53 | 1 | 53.36 | 1 | 88.26 | 1 | 176.15 |
| Oct 23–26, 2008 | (United States) 2008 Skate America | 5 | 31.81 | 4 | 55.01 | 3 | 88.84 | 4 | 175.66 |
| Nov 27–30, 2008 | (Japan) 2008 NHK Trophy | 3 | 32.18 | 4 | 50.92 | 4 | 78.35 | 3 | 161.45 |
| Jan 18–25, 2009 | (United States) 2009 U.S. Championships | 2 | 36.28 | 2 | 56.97 | 2 | 88.39 | 2 | 181.64 |
| Feb 2–8, 2009 | (Canada) 2009 Four Continents Championships | 4 | 31.41 | 3 | 59.48 | 3 | 89.90 | 3 | 180.79 |
| Mar 23–29, 2009 | (United States) 2009 World Championships | 13 | 32.51 | 11 | 54.97 | 9 | 87.28 | 11 | 174.76 |

Results in the 2009–10 season
| Date | Event | CD | | OD | | FD | | Total | |
| Date | Event | P | Score | P | Score | P | Score | P | Score |
|---|---|---|---|---|---|---|---|---|---|
| Oct 15–18, 2009 | (France) 2009 Trophée Éric Bompard | 4 | 31.11 | 6 | 46.55 | 5 | 80.41 | 4 | 158.07 |
| Nov 19–22, 2009 | 2009 Skate Canada International | 4 | 31.47 | 3 | 51.49 | 5 | 77.80 | 5 | 160.76 |
| Jan 14–24, 2010 | (United States) 2010 U.S. Championships | 4 | 37.36 | 3 | 59.60 | 3 | 93.73 | 3 | 190.69 |
| Feb 19–22, 2010 | (Canada) 2010 Winter Olympics | 14 | 31.37 | 11 | 53.99 | 11 | 88.94 | 11 | 174.30 |
| Mar 22–28, 2010 | (Italy) 2010 World Championships | 10 | 32.61 | 10 | 52.79 | 10 | 83.37 | 9 | 168.77 |

==== Junior level ====
Results in the 2005–06 season
| Date | Event | CD | | OD | | FD | | Total | |
| Date | Event | P | Score | P | Score | P | Score | P | Score |
|---|---|---|---|---|---|---|---|---|---|
| Mar 6–12, 2005 | 2005 JGP Slovakia | 6 | 27.51 | 10 | 34.30 | 6 | 64.15 | 8 | 125.96 |
| Sep 29 – Oct 2, 2005 | 2005 JGP Bulgaria | 5 | 30.13 | 5 | 43.42 | 5 | 67.13 | 5 | 140.68 |
| Jan 7–15, 2006 | (United States) 2006 U.S. Championships (Junior) | 2 | 32.94 | 2 | 51.07 | 2 | 76.23 | 2 | 160.24 |
| Mar 6–12, 2006 | (Slovenia) 2006 World Junior Championships | 10 | 27.28 | 10 | 43.91 | 11 | 62.97 | 10 | 134.16 |

Results in the 2006–07 season
| Date | Event | CD | | OD | | FD | | Total | |
| Date | Event | P | Score | P | Score | P | Score | P | Score |
|---|---|---|---|---|---|---|---|---|---|
| Sep 12–17, 2006 | 2006 JGP Mexico | 1 | 32.33 | 1 | 52.32 | 1 | 71.10 | 1 | 155.75 |
| Oct 11–14, 2006 | 2006 JGP Chinese Taipei | 2 | 30.33 | 1 | 51.38 | 1 | 72.00 | 1 | 153.71 |
| Dec 7–10, 2006 | (Bulgaria) 2006–07 Junior Grand Prix Final | 3 | 31.24 | 2 | 50.11 | 2 | 70.63 | 2 | 151.98 |
| Jan 21–28, 2007 | (United States) 2007 U.S. Championships (Junior) | 1 | 35.75 | 2 | 50.63 | 1 | 81.27 | 1 | 167.65 |
| Feb 26 – Mar 4, 2007 | (Germany) 2007 World Junior Championships | 4 | 31.18 | 2 | 53.98 | WD | —N/a | WD | —N/a |

Results in the 2007–08 season
| Date | Event | CD | | OD | | FD | | Total | |
| Date | Event | P | Score | P | Score | P | Score | P | Score |
|---|---|---|---|---|---|---|---|---|---|
| Aug 30 – Sep 2, 2007 | 2007 JGP United States | 1 | 30.76 | 1 | 51.72 | 1 | 72.94 | 1 | 155.42 |
| Sep 12–15, 2007 | 2007 JGP Austria | 1 | 34.38 | 2 | 51.73 | 1 | 85.73 | 1 | 171.84 |
| Dec 6–9, 2007 | (Poland) 2007–08 Junior Grand Prix Final | 3 | 31.70 | 2 | 55.66 | 2 | 84.49 | 2 | 171.85 |
| Feb 25 – Mar 2, 2008 | (Bulgaria) 2008 World Junior Championships | 1 | 35.11 | 1 | 57.84 | 1 | 88.71 | 1 | 181.66 |

== Personal life ==
After partnering on ice for several years, Chock and Bates began a romantic relationship in 2017. On June 11, 2022, they became engaged. They were married on June 20, 2024, in Hawaii.

== Filmography ==
=== Television ===
| Year | Title | Role | Ref. |
|---|---|---|---|
| 2021 | On Edge | Himself | |
| 2026 | Glitter & Gold: Ice Dancing | Himself | |
