= Zhang Ying (figure skater) =

Chinese figure skater (born 1997)

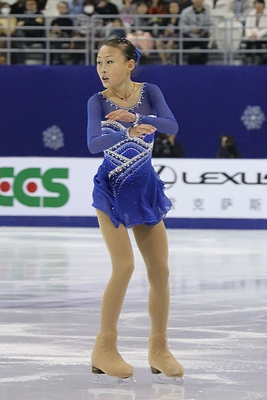

Personal information
- Born: August 17, 1997 (age 28) Qiqihar
- Height: 1.55 m (5 ft 1 in)

Figure skating career
- Country: China
- Coach: Bao Li

Zhang Ying (simplified Chinese: 张颖; traditional Chinese: 張穎; pinyin: Zhāng Yǐng; August 27, 1997) is a Chinese figure skater.

== Programs ==
Season	Short program	Free skating	Exhibition
2012–2013	Blue Light	Soul Dance	

== Competitive highlights ==
Event	2011–12	2012–13
Cup of China		8th
Chinese Championships	2nd	11th
Chinese National Games	9th	
