= Bengt Lundvall =

Swedish Navy officer (1915–2010)

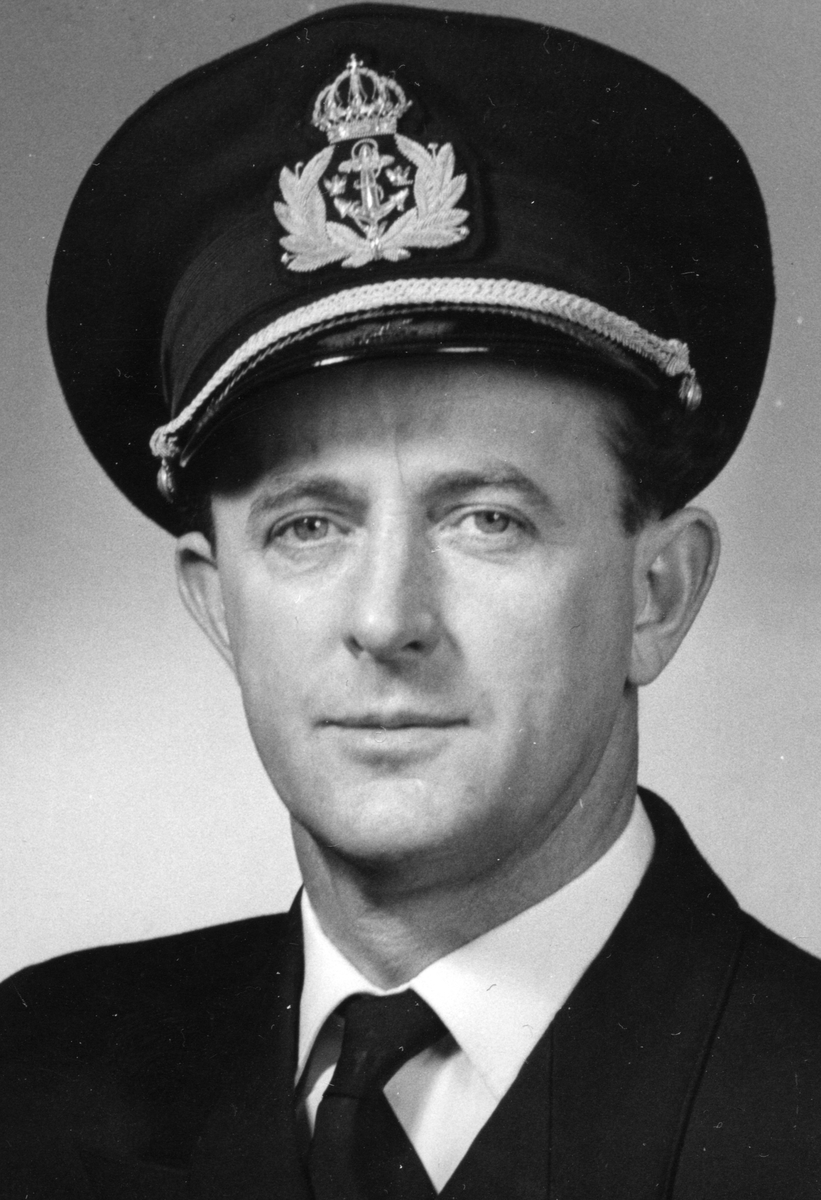
- Born: Bengt Gustaf Gottfrid Lundvall; 30 October 1915; Björkäng, Sweden
- Died: 30 November 2010 (aged 95); Undenäs, Sweden
- Military career
- Allegiance: Sweden
- Branch: Swedish Navy
- Service years: 1938–1978
- Rank: Admiral
- Commands: HSwMS Älvsnabben; Defence Staff's Planning Department; Vice Chief of the Defence Staff; Chief of Staff, Eastern Military District; Chief of the Navy

Admiral Bengt Gustaf Gottfrid Lundvall (30 October 1915 – 30 November 2010) was a senior Swedish Navy officer. He was Chief of the Navy from 1970 to 1978.

== Early life ==
Lundvall was born on 30 October 1915 in Björkäng parish, Töreboda Municipality, Sweden, the son of the clerk Gottfrid Lundvall and his wife Elna (née Andersson). He passed studentexamen in Skövde in 1934.

== Career ==
=== Military career ===
Lundvall graduated from the Royal Swedish Naval Academy in 1938. He was commissioned as a naval officer in the Swedish Navy the same year with the rank of acting sub-lieutenant (fänrik), after which he was promoted to sub-lieutenant (löjtnant) in 1940. He trained for submarine duty and did submarine service during the World War II's neutrality guard and a few years after the end of the war. He also specialized in connection, radio, radar and combat control. He completed the Royal Swedish Naval Staff College general course and staff course from 1944 to 1946. He also passed the signal officer course at the Submarine School. Lundvall was promoted to lieutenant in 1946 and attended the Royal Navy's signal and radar school from 1946 to 1947. He was captain and division commander of submarines and was promoted to lieutenant commander in 1954 and to commander in 1957. Lundwall was captain of the minelayer HSwMS Älvsnabben in 1957 and 1958 during which the ship transported expeditions to the Swedish station Kinnvika on Svalbard during the International Polar Year. Lundvall was military expert in the Airport Committee in 1956 and the 1960 and the 1962 Defense Committee. He was also a naval contributor to the Svenska Dagbladet from 1957 to 1964.

He also served in the staff of the Commander-in-Chief of the Coastal Fleet and was adjutant of the commanding officer of the Submarine Department and was head of the Communications and Planning Department in the Naval Staff as well as head of the Planning Department in the Defence Staff. Lundvall was promoted to captain in 1961 and was appointed head in the Operations Management in the Defence Staff. He was Vice Chief of the Defence Staff from 1964 to 1966 when he was promoted to rear admiral. Lundvall was then chief of the staff of the Eastern Military District (Milo Ö) from 1966 to 1970 and was promoted to vice admiral in 1970 and appointed Chief of the Navy.

In June 1975 Lundvall invited, after consultation with the Chief of Naval Operations in the United States, admiral Elmo R. Zumwalt, and the First Sea Lord in the United Kingdom, admiral Sir Edward Ashmore, to the North Atlantic Seapower Symposium in Saltsjöbaden. Lundvall's intention was, among other things, that the naval chiefs of the East and West would meet each other for the first time since the end of World War II to discuss marine issues and thus increase stability in the areas around the North Atlantic. During a week, naval chiefs from the United States (admiral James L. Holloway III), United Kingdom (admiral Ashmore), Canada, Iceland, Netherlands, Belgium, France, Norway, Denmark, Finland, West Germany, East Germany and Poland participated. From the Soviet Union, Admiral Nikolai Amelko, who was the naval commander Leningrad, was a substitute for admiral Gorshkov who was unable to attend. The meeting became a veritable success and was repeated in the summer of 1978 in Finland.

In December 1975, his appointment was extended for two years from 1 October 1976. Lundvall retired in 1978 and was promoted to full admiral upon retirement.

=== Post-retirement ===
He was inspector of the association UppSjö from 1970 to 1978 and was board member of Saléninvest AB from 1976 to 1982 and chairman of the foundation Ymer 80 from 1979 to 2000. Lundvall had a strong feeling for his home district and was a board member of AB Göta kanalbolag from 1978 to 1984 and after his retirement improved the so-called Kanalvillan (the Canal Villa) in Forsvik, which became his home.

After his active military career, Lundvall took the initiative for a polar expedition in memory of Adolf Erik Nordenskiöld's expedition through the Northeast Passage with the ship SS Vega 1878-1880. Lundvall served as chief operating officer for the expedition that was carried out by the icebreaker Ymer during the summer of 1980. He also took the initiative to form the foundation Ymer-80 in order to support young researchers and was its chairman for 10 years.

In 1998, it was revealed in the newspaper Svenska Dagbladet that during the Cold War, Lundvall as Chief of the Navy would leave Sweden for the United Kingdom to establish a Swedish war time headquarters in case of a Soviet invasion of Sweden. From there, he would, in close cooperation with the Supreme Commander of the Swedish Armed Forces back in Sweden, coordinate the warfare with support from the west, mainly from the NATO countries United Kingdom and the United States. If the defense management in Sweden failed, he would take over the highest Swedish command and lead the battle on Swedish soil with regular units. In a situation where the Swedish defence failed and Sweden became occupied, it was the Chief of the Navy's task to start the resistance. The Chief of the Navy's mission was so secret that it was never written down on paper, nor did Lundvall ever mentioned this to his wife or his son who also was a naval officer. This mission was confirmed by both Lundvall himself and the former Supreme Commander, General Stig Synnergren.

== Personal life ==
In 1941 he married Karin Rydnäs (born 1920), the daughter of the merchant Johannes Rydnäs and Ida Spjuth. He was the father of Thomas (born 1943), Ylva (born 1945) and Boel (born 1949).

== Death ==
Lundvall died on 30 November 2010 in Undenäs parish, Karlsborg Municipality.

== Dates of rank ==
- 1938 – Acting sub-lieutenant
- 1940 – Sub-lieutenant
- 1946 – Lieutenant
- 1954 – Lieutenant commander
- 1957 – Commander
- 1961 – Captain
- 1966 – Rear admiral
- 1970 – Vice admiral
- 1978 – Admiral

== Awards and decorations ==
=== Swedish ===
- (Sweden) Commander Grand Cross of the Order of the Sword (6 June 1972)
- (Sweden) Commander 1st Class of the Order of the Sword (6 June 1967)
- (Sweden) Commander of the Order of the Sword (6 June 1964)
- (Sweden) Knight 1st Class of the Order of the Sword (1956)
- (Sweden) Royal Swedish Society of Naval Sciences' honorary shield (1980)

=== Foreign ===
- (Norway) Grand Cross of the Order of St. Olav (1 July 1974)
- Commander Grand Cross of the Order of the Lion of Finland (December 1974)
- (Italy) 1st Class / Knight Grand Cross of the Order of Merit of the Italian Republic (14 March 1973)

== Honours ==
- Member of the Royal Swedish Society of Naval Sciences (1954; honorary member in 1970)
- Member of the Royal Swedish Academy of War Sciences (1963)
- Chairman of the Royal Swedish Society of Naval Sciences (1970–1978)
- President of the Royal Swedish Academy of War Sciences (1973–1975)

Military offices
Preceded by None	Defence Staff's Planning Department; 1958–1961	Succeeded by Nils-Fredrik Palmstierna
Preceded by Dag Arvas	Vice Chief of the Defence Staff; 1964–1966	Succeeded by Bo Westin
Preceded by Karl-Gösta Lundmark	Chief of Staff of the Eastern Military District; 1966–1970	Succeeded by Hans Neij
Preceded by Åke Lindemalm	Chief of the Navy; 1970–1978	Succeeded by Per Rudberg
Professional and academic associations
Preceded by Åke Lindemalm	Chairman of the Royal Swedish Society of Naval Sciences; 1970–1978	Succeeded by Bengt Rasin
Preceded by Stig Norén	President of the Royal Swedish Academy of War Sciences; 1973–1975	Succeeded by Ove Ljung
