= Ludvig Fritzson =

Swedish footballer (born 1995)

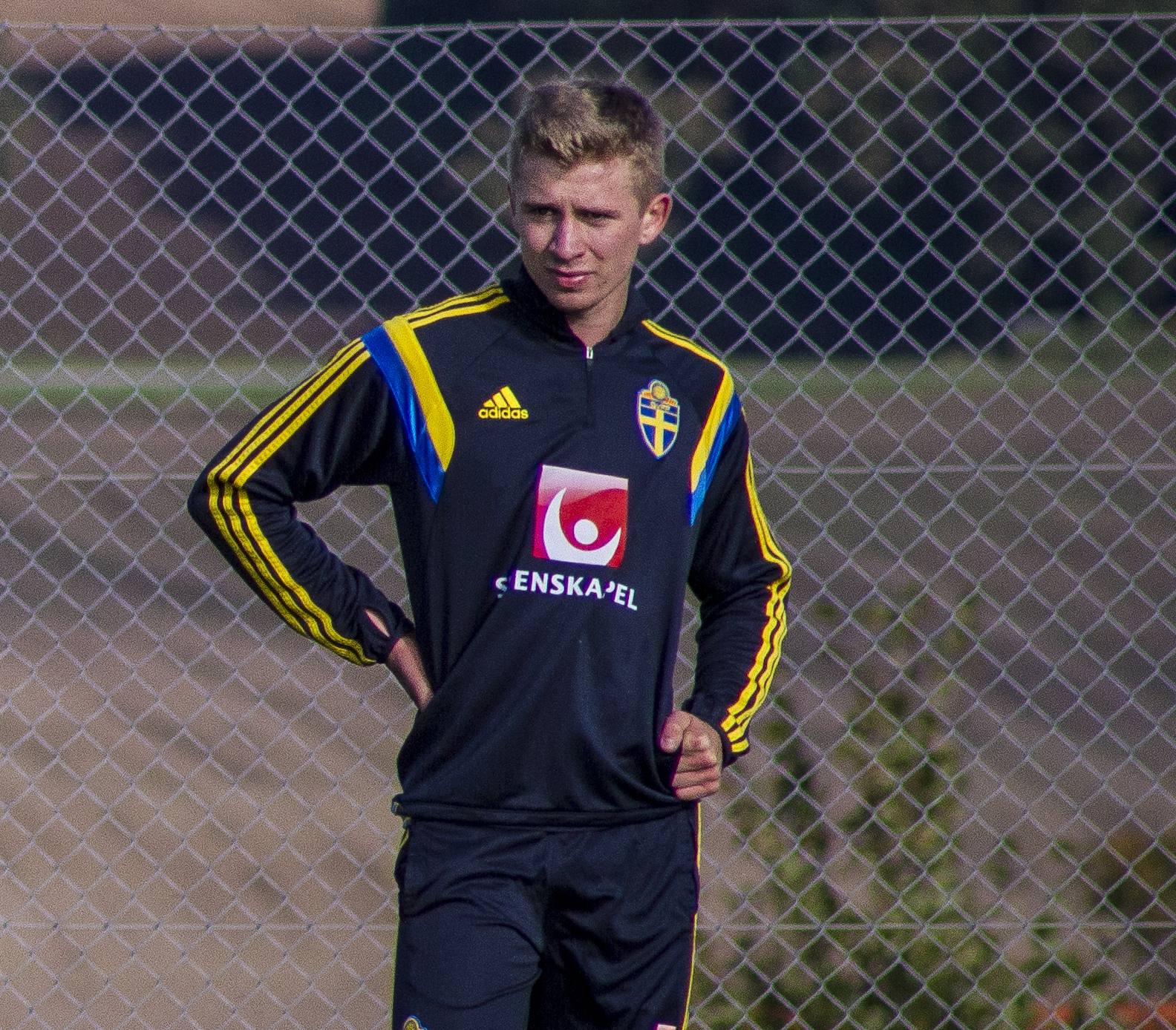

Personal information
- Full name: Nils Ludvig Fritzson
- Date of birth: 25 August 1995 (age 31)
- Place of birth: Mölltorp, Sweden
- Height: 1.87 m (6 ft 2 in)
- Position: Attacking midfielder

Team information
- Current team: Degerfors IF
- Number: 14

Youth career
- Mölltorp/Breviks AIF

Senior career*
Years	Team	Apps	(Gls)
2013–2014	Tibro AIK	44	(9)
2014	→ Örebro SK U21 (loan)	1	(0)
2014	→ Jönköping Södra IF U21 (loan)	1	(0)
2015–2016	Degerfors IF	50	(9)
2017–2022	Östersunds FK	127	(8)
2023–2025	IF Brommapojkarna	57	(9)
2025–2026	Zagłębie Lubin	5	(0)
2025–2026	Zagłębie Lubin II	13	(1)
2026–	Degerfors IF	11	(0)

International career
2015	Sweden U19	1	(0)
- * Club domestic league appearances and goals as of 8 July 2026

Nils Ludvig Fritzson (born 25 August 1995) is a Swedish professional footballer who plays as an attacking midfielder for Allsvenskan club Degerfors IF.

== Career ==
Born in Mölltorp, Fritzson began his career in the youth team of his local team Mölltorp/Breviks before making his senior debut at Tibro AIK. After impressing in the lower leagues for Tibro, he attracted the attention of Superettan side Degerfors IF. In two seasons he scored 9 goals in 50 games, and subsequently attracted the attention of Östersunds FK in the Allsvenskan. In his first season at the club, he played 13 games, scoring twice, including the winner against IFK Göteborg.

On 14 January 2025, after a two-year stint with IF Brommapojkarna, Fritzson made his first career move abroad to join Polish club Zagłębie Lubin on a deal until June 2026, with a one-year extension option.

His time in Lubin was very unsuccessful; after failing to break into the first team and making only a handful of appearances for their reserve side, he left the club in January 2026.

A month later he returned to a top-flight Degerfors, signing a two-year deal.

== Honours ==
Östersunds FK

- Svenska Cupen: 2016–17
