= Tibro =

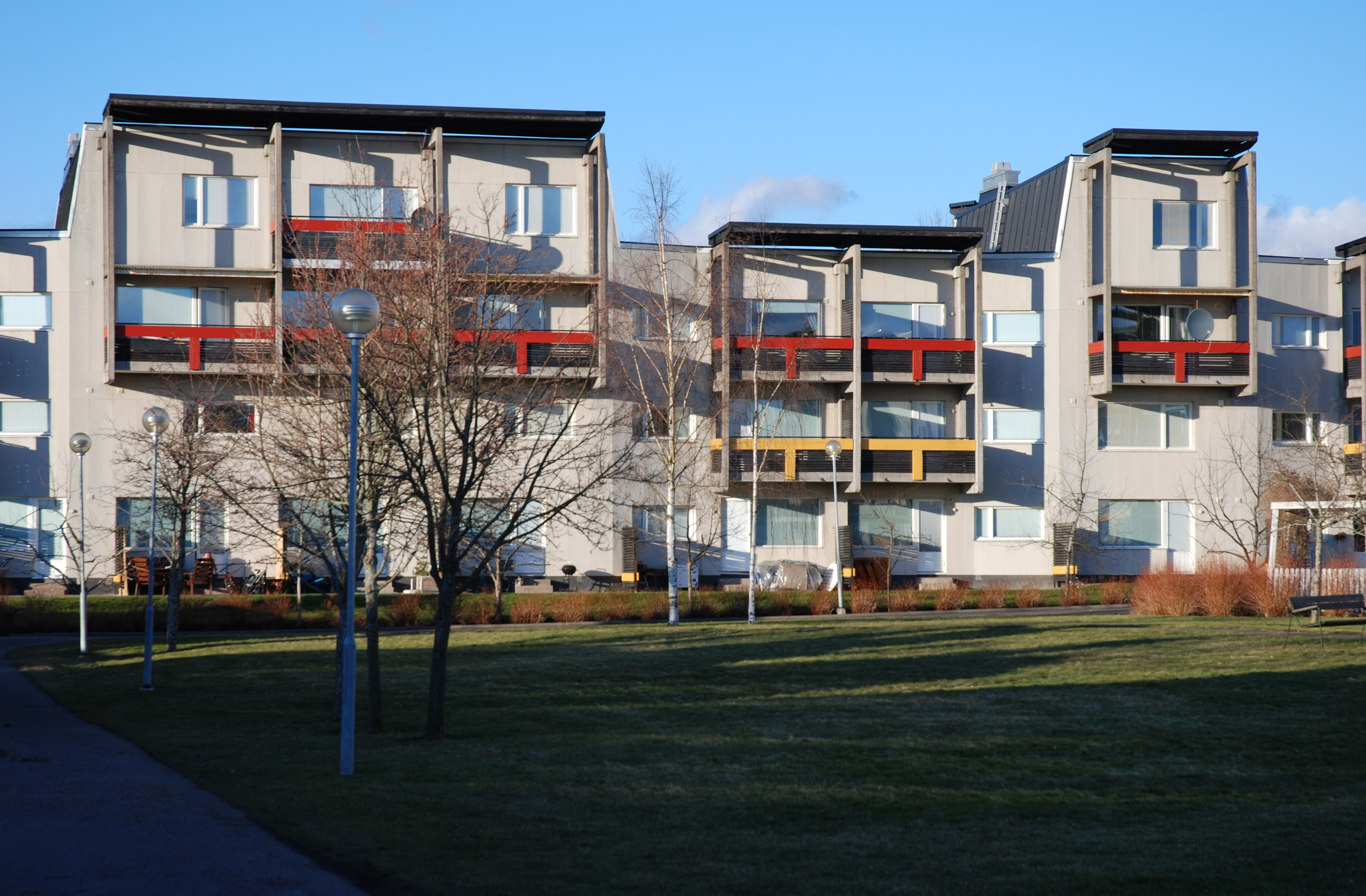
- Residential area Brittgården, designed by architect Ralph Erskine.

- Location within Västra Götaland Location within Sweden
- Coordinates: 58°25′N 14°10′E
- Country: Sweden
- Province: Västergötland
- County: Västra Götaland County
- Municipality: Tibro Municipality

Area
  - Total: 7.37 km^{2} (2.85 sq mi)

Population (31 December 2010)
  - Total: 8,018
  - Density: 1,088/km^{2} (2,820/sq mi)
- Time zone: UTC+1 (CET)
  - Summer (DST): UTC+2 (CEST)

Tibro (Swedish pronunciation: [ˈtǐːbrʊ]) is a locality and the seat of Tibro Municipality in Västra Götaland County, Sweden with 8,018 inhabitants in 2010. Tibro has a long tradition of furniture production.

== Sports ==
The following sports clubs are located in Tibro:

- Tibro AIK FK
- Tibro IBK

== Notable people ==
Tibro is also the birthplace of:

- Robin Söderling, professional tennis player.
- Anton Stralman, professional NHL hockey player on the Tampa Bay Lightning.
- Viktoria Helgesson, a professional figure skater.
- Joshi Helgesson, a professional figure skater.
- Anders Eriksson seven-time world enduro champion.
- Robert Lechte, Swedish handballer
