= Fagersanna =

- Location within Västra Götaland Location within Sweden
- Coordinates: 58°28′N 14°18′E
- Country: Sweden
- Province: Västergötland
- County: Västra Götaland County
- Municipality: Tibro Municipality

Area
  - Total: 0.81 km^{2} (0.31 sq mi)

Population (31 December 2010)
  - Total: 539
  - Density: 663/km^{2} (1,720/sq mi)
- Time zone: UTC+1 (CET)
  - Summer (DST): UTC+2 (CEST)

Fagersanna is a locality situated in Tibro Municipality, Västra Götaland County, Sweden with 539 inhabitants in 2010.
