= Viktoria Helgesson =

Swedish figure skater

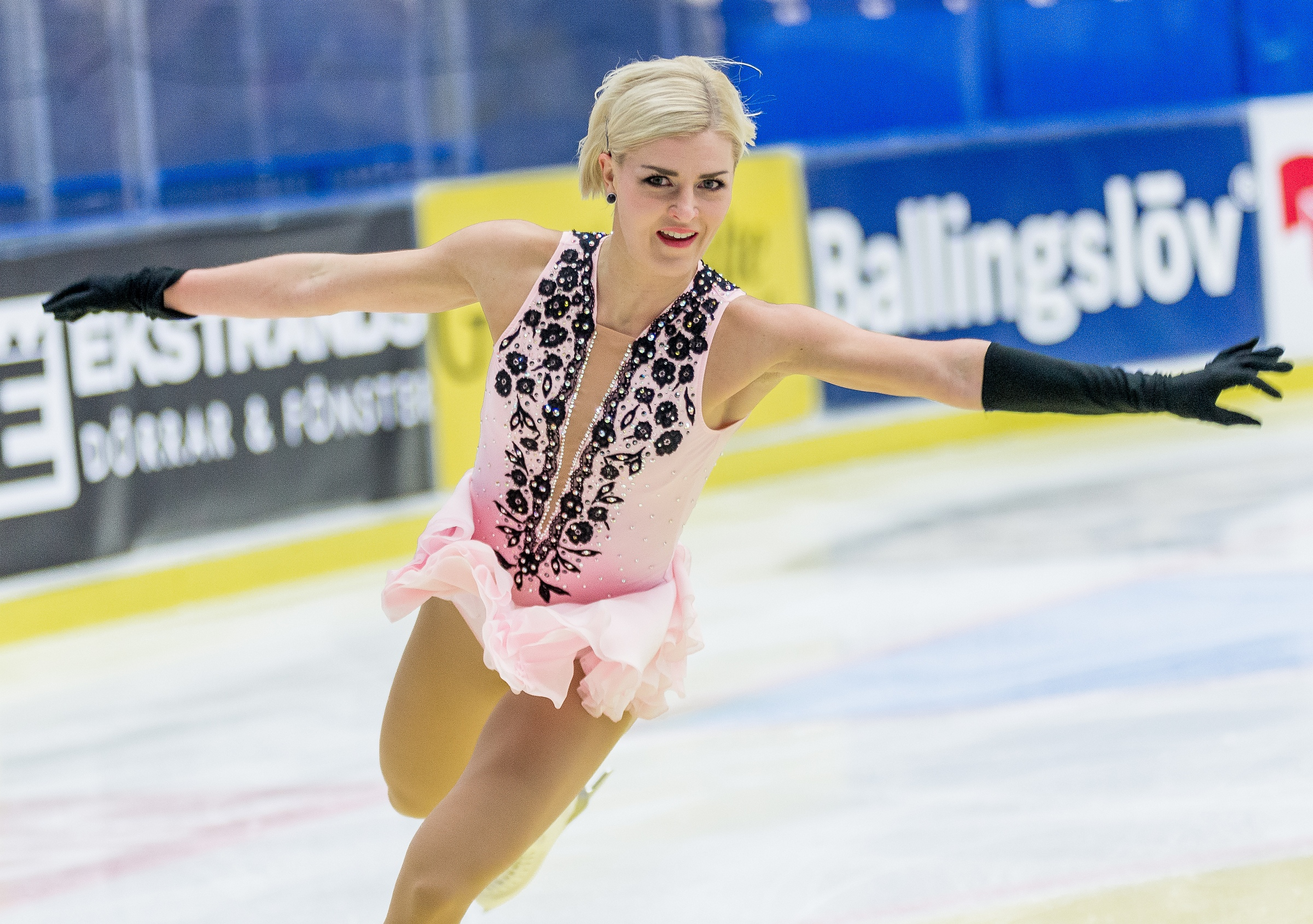
- Helgesson at the 2013–14 Swedish Championships.

Personal information
- Born: 13 September 1988 (age 38) Tibro, Sweden
- Height: 1.65 m (5 ft 5 in)

Figure skating career
- Country: Sweden
- Skating club: Tibro KK
- Began skating: 1991
- Retired: April 2015

Viktoria Helgesson (born 13 September 1988) is a retired Swedish figure skater. She is the 2011 Skate America bronze medalist, a five-time (2008–11, 2013) Nordic champion, and an eight-time (2007–12, 2014–15) Swedish national champion. She placed fifth at three European Championships. Her bronze medal at 2011 Skate America is the first Grand Prix medal by a Swedish skater.

She and her sister Joshi are the only siblings to finish together in the top 5 of a major championship as single skaters, a feat achieved during the 2015 European Championships.

== Personal life ==
Viktoria Helgesson was born in Tibro, Sweden. Her younger sister, Joshi Nero, and their mother, Christina, have also competed in figure skating at the European Championships. She also has an older brother named Lukas and a father named Lenart. Her sister-in-law is former Norwegian figure skater, Anne Line Gjersem, who married her brother in October 2022.

Following her retirement from competitive figure skating, she began coaching in Tibro alongside her sister.

In December 2017, Helgesson announced that she and her partner, Oscar, had welcomed a set of twins, Liam and Lexie. The couple would marry in June 2019.

== Career ==
Helgesson began skating at the age of three, following in the footsteps of her mother. She is coached by her mother and Regina Jensen. At the age of 12, she landed her first triple jump, a Salchow.

Helgesson competed at the 2004 World Junior Championships, where she came in 22nd. In 2007, she won the Swedish national title for the first time at the senior level. She again competed at Junior Worlds, finishing 28th.

In 2008, Helgesson made her European Championships and World Championships debut, and came in 18th at both events. She improved upon her result at the 2009 European Championships, but failed to qualify for the free skate at that season's Worlds, and was thus unable to qualify an Olympic berth for Sweden.

In 2010, Helgesson finished 11th at the Europeans. Two months later, she improved her personal best by 19 points to finish tenth at Worlds. She consequently received two Grand Prix assignments in the 2010–11 season, the first of her career; she finished 9th at the 2010 NHK Trophy and 6th at that season's Skate America. She medalled at two international events, the 2010 Nebelhorn Trophy and the 2010 Merano Cup, and improved to 6th at the European Championships, the best finish by a Swedish figure skater since 1932. She was 17th at the 2011 World Championships.

In addition to Sweden, Helgesson also trained in Colorado and Boston. She began the 2011–12 season at the 2011 Nebelhorn Trophy, where she finished 5th. In October 2011, Helgesson won the bronze medal at the 2011 Skate America, her first medal at a Grand Prix event, as well as the first by any Swedish skater. She achieved a career-best European placement, 5th, at the 2012 and 2013 European Championships.

Helgesson represented Sweden at the 2014 Winter Olympics in Sochi. She placed fifth at the 2015 European Championships in Stockholm, Sweden. In April 2015, she retired from competition.

== Programs ==
Season	Short program	Free skating	Exhibition
2014–2015	This Woman's Work by Kate Bush	Sunset Boulevard by Andrew Lloyd Webber	Eye of the Tiger by Survivor
2013–2014	Mystery Waltz by Laeroport de Biarritz; Suite for Variety Orchestra: Waltz (from Eyes Wide Shut) by Dmitri Shostakovich	Harem Cobra Goddess by Les Baxter; Harem Silks from Bombay	
2012–2013	Poinciana	Spellbound Concerto by Miklós Rózsa	
2011–2012	My Funny Valentine performed by Ahn Trio	Sunset Boulevard by Andrew Lloyd Webber	Someone like You by Adele
2010–2011	Fuori Dal Mondo (from This Is England) by Ludovico Einaudi; Nessun dorma (from Turandot) Giacomo Puccini	The Drummer by Trey Lee; Sad Romance by Thảo Nguyên Xanh; August Rhapsody (from August Rush) by Mark Mancina	
2009–2010	Fuori Dal Mondo (from This Is England) by Ludovico Einaudi	One Moment in Time by Albert Hammond, John Bettis performed by Vanessa-Mae; Finale di un concerto interotto per violin (from Canone inverso) by Ennio Morricone	
2008–2009	Think of Me (from Phantom of the Opera); The Phantom of the Opera by Andrew Lloyd Webber	One Moment in Time by Albert Hammond, John Bettis performed by Vanessa-Mae; Finale di un concerto interotto per violin (from Canone inverso) by Ennio Morricone	
2007–2008	The Rose by Floyd Cramer	Assassin's Tango (from Mr. & Mrs. Smith) by John Powell; Pasha performed by Vanessa-Mae; Assassin's Tango	
2006–2007	Nothing Else Matters by Metallica performed by Apocalyptica	Assassin's Tango (from Mr. & Mrs. Smith) by John Powell; Pasha performed by Vanessa-Mae; Assassin's Tango	
2005–2006	Nothing Else Matters by Metallica performed by Apocalyptica	Paganini's Caprice; Despues De Ti Que by Christian Castro, Raul di Blasio; Paganini's Caprice	
2004–2005	Lawrence of Arabia by Maurice Jarre	Etude in C Minor – Opus 25 by Frédéric Chopin; Theme from Somewhere in Time by John Barry; Rhapsoday on a Theme of Paganini by Sergei Rachmaninoff; Fantasie Impromptu Op. 66 by Frédéric Chopin	
2003–2004	Lawrence of Arabia by Maurice Jarre	Riverdance by Bill Whelan	

== Competitive highlights ==
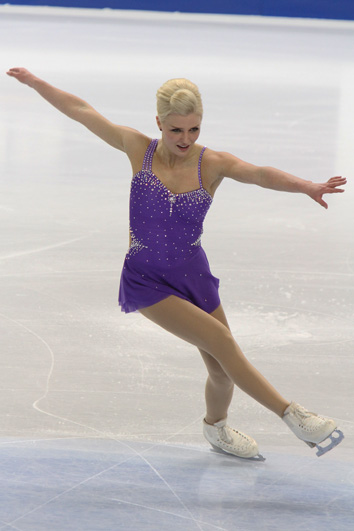
Helgesson at the 2010 World Championships

GP: Grand Prix; CS: Challenger Series (began in the 2014–15 season); JGP: Junior Grand Prix

International
Event	02–03	03–04	04–05	05–06	06–07	07–08	08–09	09–10	10–11	11–12	12–13	13–14	14–15
Olympics												27th	
Worlds						18th	27th	10th	17th	11th	14th		
Europeans						18th	14th	11th	6th	5th	5th	14th	5th
GP Bompard										5th		7th	
GP Cup of China													7th
GP NHK Trophy									9th				
GP Rostelecom											8th		
GP Skate America									6th	3rd	8th	8th	
GP Skate Canada													11th
CS Lombardia													8th
CS Nepela Trophy												4th	4th
Challenge Cup						5th	1st			4th			
Cup of Nice					3rd			8th					
Finlandia						11th		9th					
Golden Spin							5th						
Karl Schäfer							5th						
Merano Cup								5th	1st				
Nebelhorn									2nd	5th	6th		
Nordics		2nd J.	6th J.		6th	1st	1st	1st	1st		1st	2nd	
NRW Trophy								10th		1st	3rd		
International: Junior
Junior Worlds		22nd			28th								
JGP Austria						8th							
JGP Bulgaria						4th							
JGP Czech Rep.		12th											
JGP Germany			17th										
JGP Hungary			14th										
JGP Slovakia				16th									
Copenhagen	1st J.	5th J.											
Gardena		4th J.											
Golden Bear	4th J.												
Mladost Trophy	5th J.												
National
Swedish Champ.		1st J.	3rd J.	2nd	1st	1st	1st	1st	1st	1st	2nd	1st	1st
J. = Junior level; WD = Withdrew
