= Forsvik =

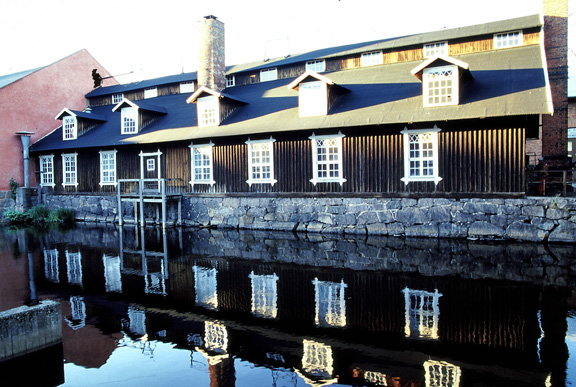
- The forge in Forsvik

- Location within Västra Götaland Location within Sweden
- Coordinates: 58°35′N 14°26′E
- Country: Sweden
- Province: Västergötland
- County: Västra Götaland County
- Municipality: Karlsborg Municipality

Area
  - Total: 0.83 km^{2} (0.32 sq mi)

Population (31 December 2010)
  - Total: 342
  - Density: 413/km^{2} (1,070/sq mi)
- Time zone: UTC+1 (CET)
  - Summer (DST): UTC+2 (CEST)

Forsvik is a locality situated in Karlsborg Municipality, Västra Götaland County, Sweden. It had 342 inhabitants in 2010.
