= Tibro Municipality =

Tibro Municipality Tibro kommun
- Municipality
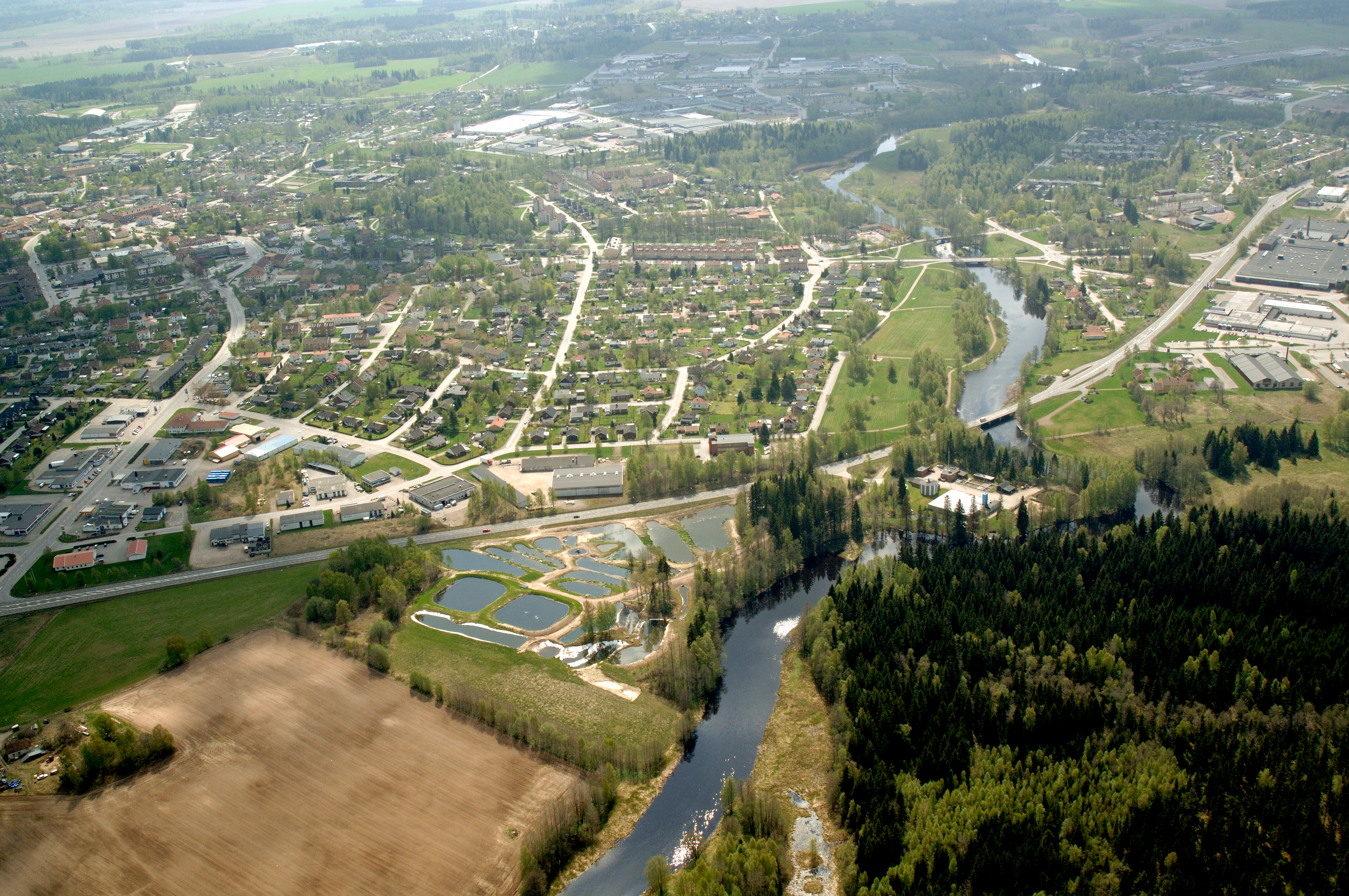

- Coat of arms

- Coordinates: 58°25′N 14°10′E
- Country: Sweden
- County: Västra Götaland County
- Seat: Tibro

Area
  - Total: 236.84 km^{2} (91.44 sq mi)
  - Land: 221.47 km^{2} (85.51 sq mi)
  - Water: 15.37 km^{2} (5.93 sq mi)
- Area as of 1 January 2014.

Population (30 June 2025)
  - Total: 11,275
  - Density: 50.910/km^{2} (131.86/sq mi)
- Time zone: UTC+1 (CET)
  - Summer (DST): UTC+2 (CEST)
- ISO 3166 code: SE
- Province: Västergötland
- Municipal code: 1472
- Website: www.tibro.se

Tibro Municipality (Swedish: Tibro kommun) is a municipality in Västra Götaland County in western Sweden. Its seat is located in the town of Tibro. Fagersanna is the only other population center in the municipality.

== Demographics ==
This is a demographic table based on Tibro Municipality's electoral districts in the 2022 Swedish general election sourced from SVT's election platform, in turn taken from SCB official statistics.

In total there were 11,272 residents, including 8,641 Swedish citizens of voting age. 44.0% voted for the left coalition and 54.7% for the right coalition. Indicators are in percentage points except population totals and income.

Location	Residents	Citizen adults	Left vote	Right vote	Employed	Swedish parents	Foreign heritage	Income SEK	Degree
Location			%	%					
Fagersanna, Ransberg	1,676	1,382	42.3	56.8	88	94	6	27,842	35
Häggetorp, Katrineberg	1,830	1,340	47.5	50.7	73	74	26	22,841	32
Hörnebo, Kvarnhagen	1,932	1,452	39.6	58.9	86	90	10	27,163	29
Skattegården	1,847	1,355	46.3	52.9	66	61	39	18,694	24
Smuleberg	1,745	1,328	41.3	56.9	74	77	23	22,259	25
Södra Centrum	2,242	1,784	46.6	52.6	80	82	18	23,301	30
Source: SVT

== Sports ==
The sports club Tibro AIK FK is located in Tibro Municipality.

The famous tennis player Robin Söderling and ice hockey player Anton Strålman come from Tibro.
