= Joshi Nero =

Swedish figure skater

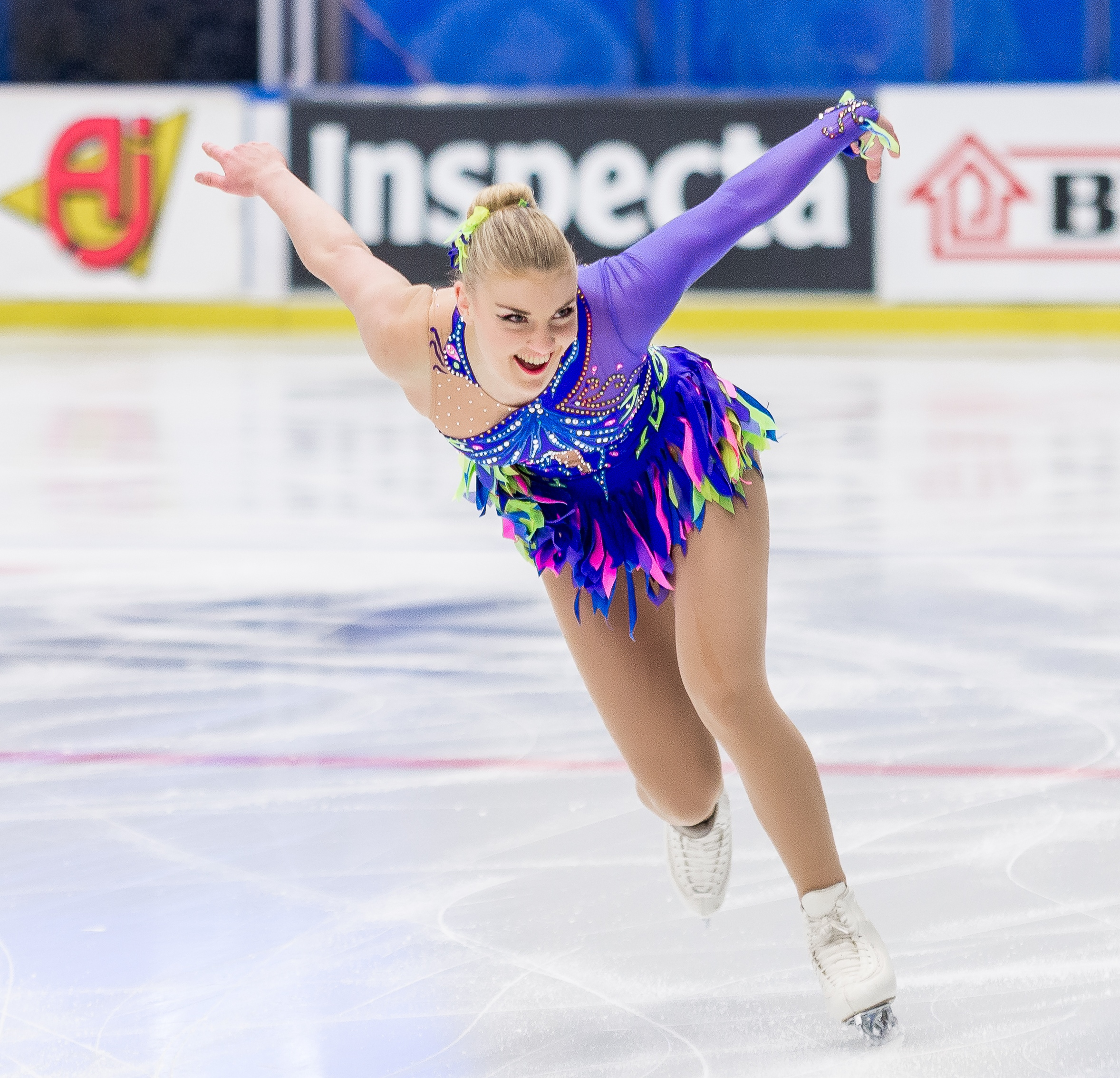
- Nero at the 2013-14 Swedish Championships.

Personal information
- Other names: Joshi Helgesson
- Born: 7 June 1993 (age 33) Tibro, Sweden
- Home town: Tibro
- Height: 1.71 m (5 ft 7 in)

Figure skating career
- Country: Sweden
- Coach: Christina Helgesson, Brian Orser, Ghisland Briand
- Skating club: Tibro KK
- Began skating: 1996
- Retired: 7 November 2017

Joshi Nero, (née Helgesson; born 7 June 1993) is a Swedish retired figure skater. She is the 2014 Bavarian Open champion, 2011 Nebelhorn Trophy bronze medalist, and three-time Swedish national champion.

She and her sister Viktoria are the only siblings to finish together in the top 5 of a major championship as single skaters, a feat achieved during the 2015 European Championships.

== Personal life ==
Nero was born in Tibro, Sweden. Her elder sister, Viktoria, is also a former competitive skater, and their mother, Christina, is their coach. She also has an older brother named Lukas and a father named Lennart. Her sister-in-law is former Norwegian figure skater, Anne Line Gjersem, who married her brother in October 2022.

Following her retirement from competitive figure skating, she began coaching in Tibro alongside her sister.

In June 2022, Nero announced on her Instagram that she was pregnant with her boyfriend, Isak Nero's, child. She gave birth to a daughter, Hailey, in September 2022. She and Nero would marry in June 2023.

== Career ==
=== Early career ===
Nero placed 4th at the 2009 World Junior Championships in Sofia, Bulgaria. Her Grand Prix debut came at the start of the following season; she placed 9th at the 2009 Skate America and 11th at the 2009 Skate Canada International.

In April 2011, Nero made her senior ISU Championship debut at the World Championships in Moscow. After advancing past the preliminary round, she placed 16th in the short program and qualified for the final segment. Her 13th place in the free skate lifted her to 15th overall. In January 2012, Nero finished 10th in Sheffield, England at her first European Championships.

=== 2012–13 season: Top ten at Europeans ===
In the early part of the 2012–13 season, Nero sustained a stress fracture of the fibula in her take-off leg but returned to the ice two weeks before the 2012 Cup of China, where she finished 7th. She placed 8th at her second GP event, the 2012 Trophée Éric Bompard, and 9th at the 2012 NRW Trophy.

She won the 2013 Swedish national title ahead of her sister and went on to place 8th at the 2013 European Championships in Zagreb, Croatia. After taking silver at the Nordic Championships, she closed her season with gold medals at the Hellmut Seibt Memorial and Coupe du Printemps.

=== 2013–14 season: Final Worlds and Nordic Champion ===
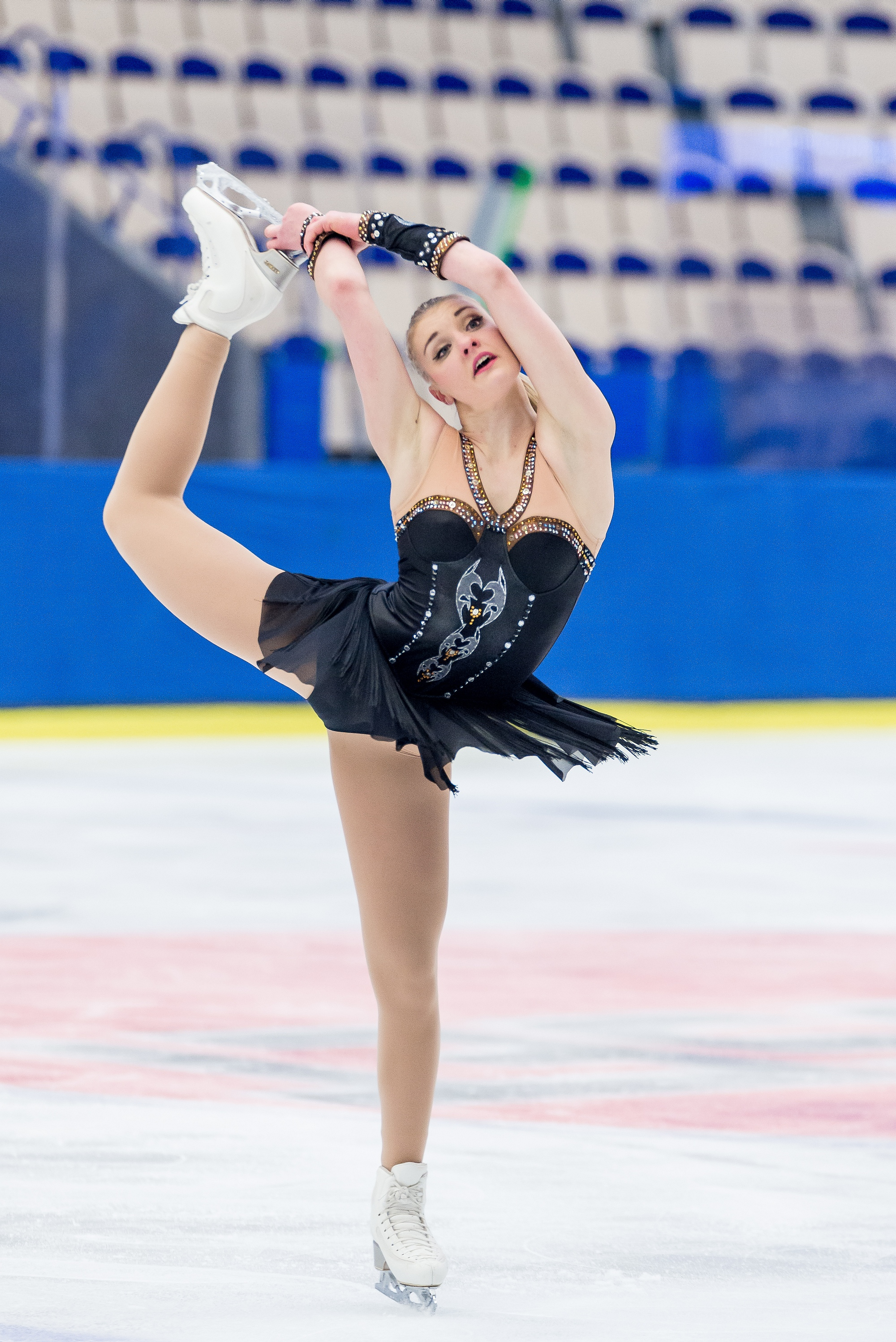
Nero at the 2013–14 Swedish Championships

Nero started her season by winning the silver medal at the Denkova-Staviski Cup. After taking silver at the Swedish Championships, she placed 9th at the 2014 European Championships in Budapest, Hungary.

Nero won gold at the Bavarian Open and at the Nordic Championships. In March 2014, she travelled to Saitama, Japan to compete at her second World Championships; she placed 15th in the short, 12th in the free, and 14th overall.

=== 2014–15 season: 4th at Europeans ===
Nero started her season on the ISU Challenger Series (CS), finishing 7th at the Lombardia Trophy and winning the silver medal at the Ondrej Nepela Trophy. She withdrew from both of her GP assignments, the 2014 Skate America and 2014 Rostelecom Cup, due to an injury.

After winning silver at the Swedish Championships, Nero achieved a career-best 4th-place finish at the European Championships in Stockholm, Sweden. Closing her season, she finished 14th at the 2015 World Championships in Shanghai, China.

=== 2015–16 season ===
After starting her season with silver at the Lombardia Trophy, Nero competed at a pair of CS events, placing 7th at the 2015 Ondrej Nepela Trophy and then taking the bronze medal at the 2015 Finlandia Trophy. She finished 9th at both of her GP assignments, the 2015 Skate Canada International and 2015 Rostelecom Cup. At the 2016 Europeans Nero placed 6th in the short program, but 11th in the free skate and 9th overall. She won the 2016 Nordics Open ahead of Viveca Lindfors. At the 2016 Worlds she did two major mistakes in her short program, placed 30th and did not qualify to the free skate.

=== 2016–17 season ===
Following the 2016–17 season, Nero announced that she would move from Tibro to Toronto, Ontario, Canada to train with Brian Orser. She started her season by placing 7th at 2016 CS Autumn Classic and 9th at 2016 CS Finlandia Trophy.

=== 2017–18 season ===
Nero trained for the season to participate in the 2018 Winter Olympics. She competed at the 2017 CS Lombardia Trophy, but her level of skating did not improve as she planned. On 7 November 2017, she announced her retirement from competition.

== Programs ==
Season	Short program	Free skating	Exhibition
2017–2018	Unforgettable by Irving Gordon performed by Sia choreo. by Joey Russell	Sylvia by Léo Delibes choreo. by David Wilson	
2016–2017	Let Me Entertain You from Gypsy by Jule Styne and Stephen Sondheim performed by Debbie Gibson choreo. by Catarina Lindgren	Endangered Species performed by Dianne Reeves; Composition of Rayshaun by RayShaun Thompson choreo. by Catarina Lindgren	
2015–2016	Too Darn Hot (RAC mix) performed by Ella Fitzgerald choreo. by Catarina Lindgren	Once Upon a Time in Mexico by Robert Rodriguez; Las bandidas by Éric Serra choreo. by Catarina Lindgren; Once Upon a Time in Mexico by Robert Rodriguez; Shot You Down by Audio Bullys ft. Nancy Sinatra; Bang Bang (My Baby Shot Me Down) performed by Nico Vega; Las bandidas by Éric Serra choreo. by Catarina Lindgren	
2014–2015	Blackbird performed by Dionne Farris choreo. by Catarina Lindgren	Snow White and the Huntsman by James Newton Howard choreo. by Catarina Lindgren	Eye of the Tiger by Survivor
2013–2014	Cirque du Soleil: Mystere; Taiko choreo. by Catarina Lindgren	Warrior Princess (from Cirque du Soleil); An Ancient Muse by Loreena McKennitt; Here Comes the King by X-Ray Dog choreo. by Catarina Lindgren	
2012–2013	Cirque du Soleil: Mystere; Taiko choreo. by Catarina Lindgren	Burlesque; Express; Blues in Night by Quincy Jones; Show Me How You Burlesque choreo. by Catarina Lindgren	
2011–2012	The Man with the Golden Arm	Romeo and Juliet by Craig Armstrong; Romeo and Juliet by Sergei Prokofiev performed by Vanessa-Mae	
2010–2011	Sarabande Suite	Palladio by Karl Jenkins; Feeling Good; Palladio by Karl Jenkins	
2009–2010	Magaya by Chris Spheeris	Symphony No. 5 by Ludwig van Beethoven performed by Edvin Marton; Somewhere in Time by John Barry performed by Maksim Mrvica; The Godfather by Nino Rota, Carmine Coppola performed by Edvin Marton	
2008–2009	Amélie by Yann Tiersen	Symphony No. 5 by Ludwig van Beethoven performed by Edvin Marton; Somewhere in Time by John Barry performed by Maksim Mrvica; The Godfather by Nino Rota, Carmine Coppola performed by Edvin Marton	
2007–2008	Pachelbel's Canon by Johann Pachelbel	Arabian selections; Pasha by Vanessa-Mae; Shik Shak Shok by Arabic Hakim Belly Dancing	

== Competitive highlights ==
GP: Grand Prix; CS: Challenger Series; JGP: Junior Grand Prix

=== 2009–10 to present ===
International
Event	09–10	10–11	11–12	12–13	13–14	14–15	15–16	16–17	17–18
Worlds		15th			14th	14th	30th	26th	
Europeans			10th	8th	9th	4th	9th	14th	
GP Bompard				9th					
GP Cup of China		7th		7th				12th	
GP Rostel. Cup						WD	9th		
GP Skate America	9th	4th	10th			WD			
GP Skate Canada	11th						9th	10th	
CS Autumn Classic								7th	
CS Finlandia							3rd	9th	WD
CS Lombardia						6th			14th
CS Nepela Trophy						2nd	7th		
Bavarian Open					1st				
Challenge Cup								4th	
Cup of Nice		10th							
DS Cup					2nd				
Finlandia	14th								
Hellmut Seibt				1st					
Lombardia							2nd		
Merano Cup			3rd						
Mont Blanc		2nd							
Nebelhorn	18th	4th	3rd						
Nordics	3rd	6th	2nd	2nd	1st		1st	4th	
NRW Trophy			5th	9th					
Printemps				1st		1st	1st		
Triglav Trophy	2nd								
International: Junior
Junior Worlds	9th		9th						
National
Swedish Champ.	2nd	2nd	2nd	1st	2nd	2nd	1st	1st	
WD: Withdrew

=== 2004–05 to 2008–09 ===
International
Event	04–05	05–06	06–07	07–08	08–09
Challenge Cup					2nd
Golden Spin					2nd
International: Junior or novice
Junior Worlds				7th	4th
JGP Estonia				7th	
JGP Hungary			9th		
JGP Italy					7th
JGP South Africa					9th
JGP USA				6th	
EYOF					2nd J.
Challenge Cup				4th J.	
Cup of Nice			3rd J.		
Nordics		3rd N.	4th J.	1st J.	1st J.
Copenhagen	2nd N.				
Triglav Trophy	4th N.				
National
Swedish Champ.			1st J.	1st J.	1st J.
Levels: N. = Novice; J. = Junior
