= Anton Strålman =

Swedish ice hockey player (born 1986)

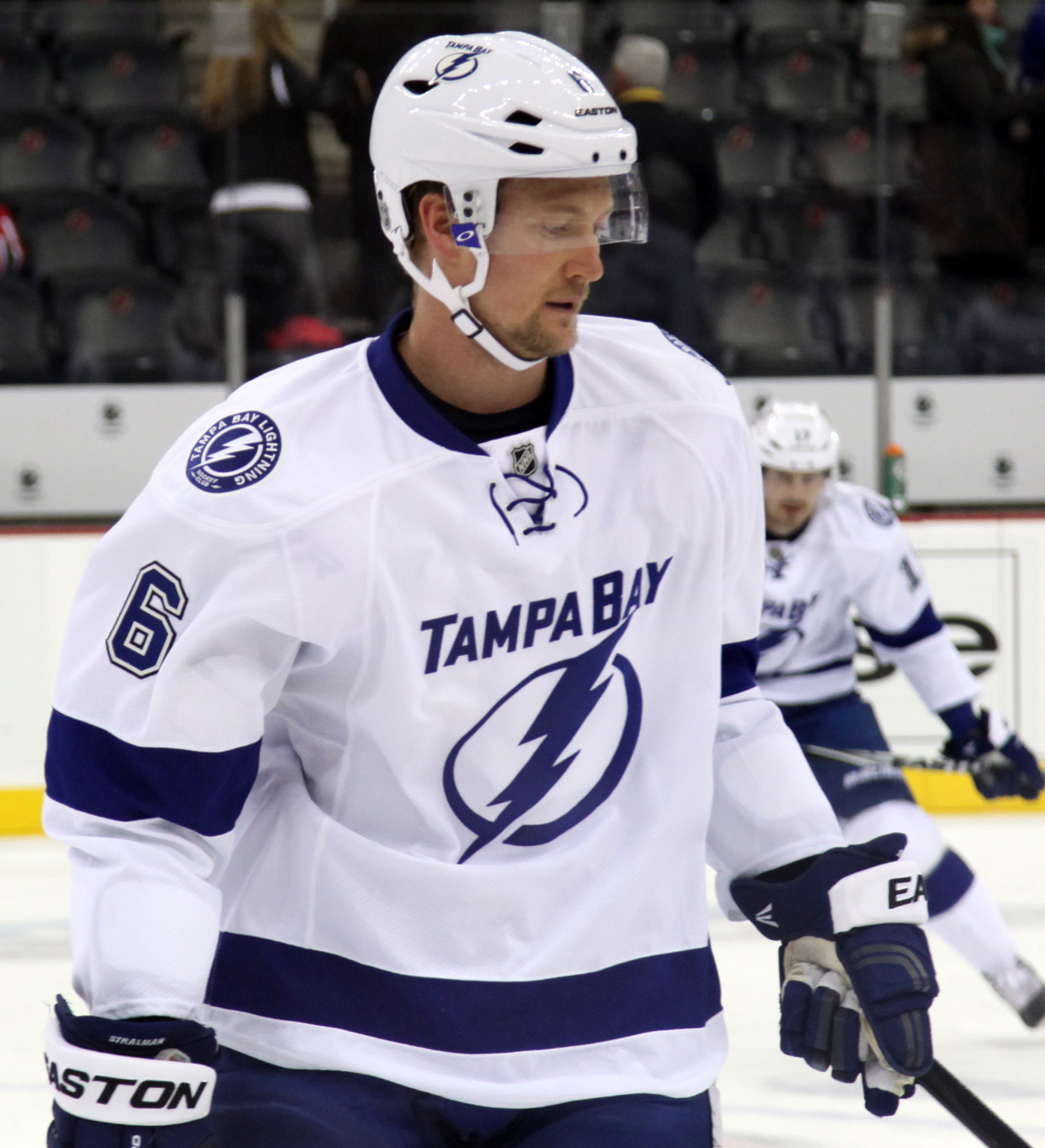
- Strålman with the Tampa Bay Lightning in December 2014
- Born: 1 August 1986 (age 40) Tibro, Sweden
- Height: 5 ft 11 in (180 cm)
- Weight: 190 lb (86 kg; 13 st 8 lb)
- Position: Defence
- Shot: Right
- Played for: Timrå IK; Toronto Maple Leafs; Columbus Blue Jackets; New York Rangers; Tampa Bay Lightning; Florida Panthers; Arizona Coyotes; Boston Bruins; HV71
- National team: Sweden
- NHL draft: 216th overall, 2005; Toronto Maple Leafs
- Playing career: 2005–2024
- Website: stralman.com

Anton Strålman (born 1 August 1986) is a former Swedish professional ice hockey defenceman. Strålman last played for HV71 in the Swedish Hockey League. He also played in the National Hockey League (NHL) for the Toronto Maple Leafs, the organization that drafted him in the seventh round, 216th overall, in 2005, as well as the Columbus Blue Jackets, the New York Rangers, the Tampa Bay Lightning, the Florida Panthers, the Arizona Coyotes, and the Boston Bruins.

== Playing career ==
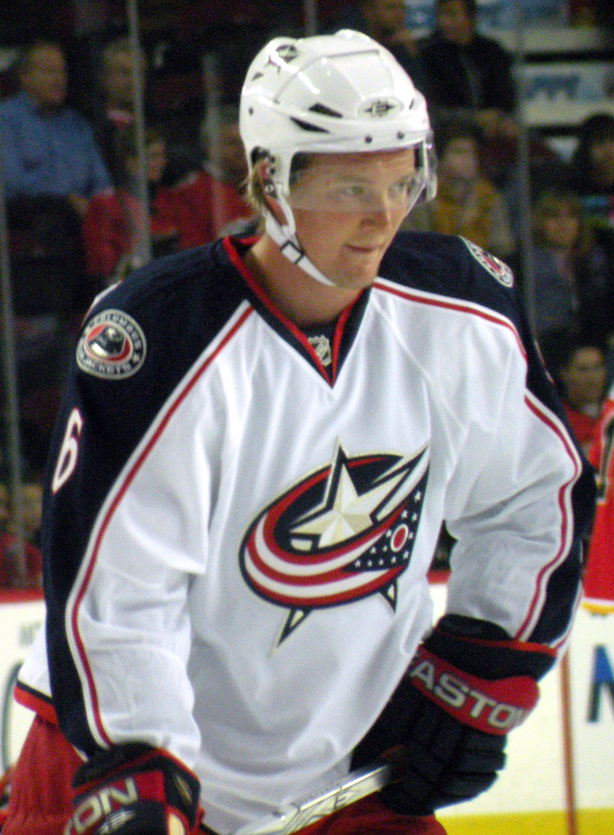
Strålman with the Blue Jackets in October 2009.

Strålman was selected on 30 July 2005, by the Toronto Maple Leafs as their fifth draft choice, 216th overall. He was picked in the seventh and final round of the post-lockout 2005 NHL entry draft. Earlier the same year, on 4 April, Strålman had signed a two-year contract with Timrå IK of the Swedish Elitserien.

During the following 2005–06 season, Strålman adapted to Elitserien quickly and became a team regular. On 20 January 2006, this effort was recognized when he was named the third of four candidates for the 2006 Elitserien Rookie of the Year. The award was eventually won by forward Nicklas Bäckström.

=== Toronto Maple Leafs (2007–2009) ===
On 16 May 2007, Strålman signed a three-year contract with the Toronto Maple Leafs. He made his North American professional debut on 6 October 2007, with the Toronto Marlies, the American Hockey League (AHL) affiliate of the Maple Leafs, and made his NHL debut on 23 October in a home game against the Atlanta Thrashers. On 21 March 2008, he scored his first career NHL goal in a game against the Buffalo Sabres, then recorded his first multi-goal game against the Montreal Canadiens on 29 March.

=== Columbus Blue Jackets (2009–2011) ===
During the 2009 off-season, Strålman was traded twice. On 27 July, he was traded to the Calgary Flames, along with Colin Stuart and a seventh-round draft pick in 2012, in exchange for Wayne Primeau and a second-round pick in the 2011. Several months later, on 28 September, he was traded by the Flames to the Columbus Blue Jackets for a third-round pick in 2010.

=== New York Rangers (2011–2014) ===
As a free agent after the 2010–11 season, Strålman was on a try-out contract with the New Jersey Devils, but did not stick with the team when the final team roster was released. On 3 November, he then signed a one-year contract with the New York Rangers.

As a restricted free agent at the end of the season, he initially planned to bring the Rangers to a salary arbitrator, but on 26 July 2012, he signed a two-year, $3.4 million contract with New York. During the 2014 Stanley Cup playoffs, Strålman helped the Rangers reach the 2014 Stanley Cup Final, where they were ultimately defeated by the Los Angeles Kings in five games.

=== Tampa Bay Lightning (2014–2019) ===
On 1 July 2014, Strålman left the Rangers organization as an unrestricted free agent and signed a five-year, $22 million contract with the Tampa Bay Lightning. In the 2014–15 season, he set career-highs in goals (nine), assists (30) and points (39) in his first season with the Lightning while playing on the first defensive unit with fellow countrymen Victor Hedman, helping the team reach the 2015 Stanley Cup Final. During the 2015 Eastern Conference Finals, the Lightning defeated his former team, the Presidents' Trophy-winning New York Rangers, in seven games before ultimately getting defeated by the Chicago Blackhawks in six games in the Finals.

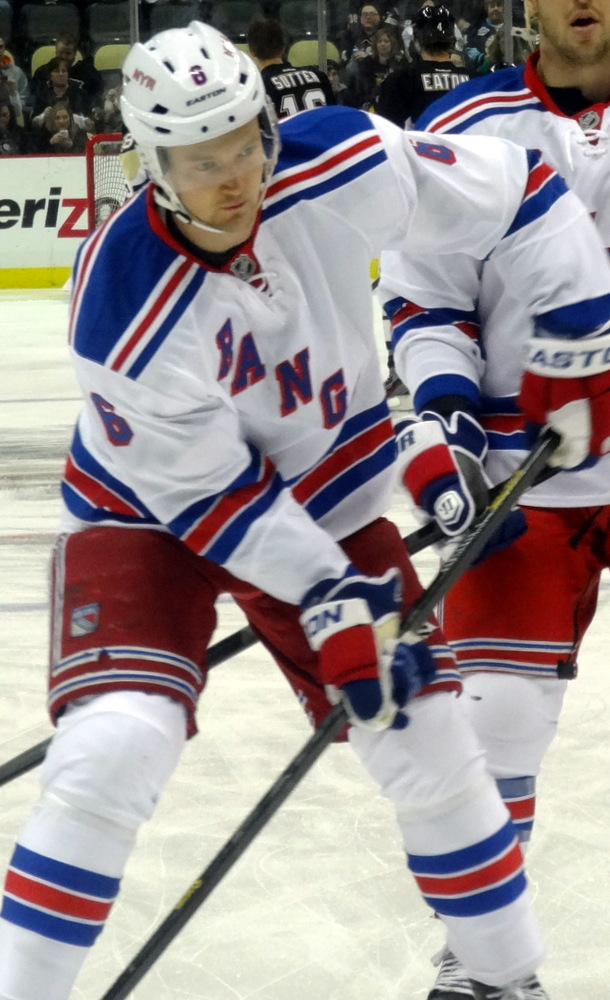
Strålman with the Rangers in March 2013.

On 27 November 2015, Strålman played in his 500th career NHL game in a 2–4 Lightning loss to the Washington Capitals. On 25 March 2016, Strålman suffered a non-displaced fracture of his left fibula, during a 7–4 win over the New York Islanders. After missing the last eight games of the 2015–16 season and the first two rounds of the 2016 playoffs against the Detroit Red Wings and New York Islanders, Strålman returned to the lineup in time for the third round series against the Pittsburgh Penguins, where they would fall in seven games, one win short of a second consecutive appearance in the Stanley Cup Final (third consecutive for Strålman himself).

=== Florida Panthers (2019–2021) ===
After five seasons with the Lightning organization, Strålman left as a free agent to sign a three-year, $16.5 million contract with the Florida Panthers on July 1, 2019.

=== Arizona Coyotes (2021–2022) ===
On 26 July 2021, Strålman was traded to the Arizona Coyotes along with Vladislav Kolyachonok and a second-round pick in the 2024 NHL entry draft in exchange for a 7th-round pick in the 2023 NHL entry draft.

=== Boston Bruins (2022–2023) ===
As a free agent at the conclusion of his contract with the Coyotes, Strålman went un-signed over the summer. Approaching the 2022–23 season, he initially joined the Boston Bruins training camp and pre-season on a professional tryout before agreeing to a one-year, $1 million contract on 11 October 2022.

=== Post NHL playing career ===
Strålman signed a one-year contract with HV71 of the Swedish Hockey League (SHL) on 15 July 2023.

== International play ==
On 2 March 2016, the Swedish Ice Hockey Association named Strålman to its roster for the 2016 World Cup of Hockey. Strålman was joined by Lightning teammate Victor Hedman. The tournament ran from 17 Sep to 1 October 2016, in Toronto.

On 15 April 2017, the Swedish Ice Hockey Association invited Strålman to its roster for the 2017 IIHF World Championship. However, he was awaiting medical clearance. On 18 April 2017, it was announced that Strålman was cleared to play for team Sweden in the tournament. On May 21, 2017, Strålman helped team Sweden capture gold in a 2–1 victory over Canada.

== Career statistics ==
=== Regular season and playoffs ===
			Regular season					Playoffs
Season	Team	League	GP	G	A	Pts	PIM	GP	G	A	Pts	PIM
2002–03	Skövde IK	SWE.2 U20	46	20	9	29	38	—	—	—	—	—
2003–04	Skövde IK	SWE.3	27	4	8	12	18	10	3	1	4	4
2004–05	Skövde IK	SWE.2	41	9	9	18	34	9	1	2	3	6
2005–06	Timrå IK	SEL	45	1	4	5	28	—	—	—	—	—
2005–06	Timrå IK	J20	—	—	—	—	—	3	0	0	0	4
2006–07	Timrå IK	SEL	53	10	11	21	34	7	1	3	4	10
2007–08	Toronto Marlies	AHL	21	0	11	11	22	—	—	—	—	—
2007–08	Toronto Maple Leafs	NHL	50	3	6	9	18	—	—	—	—	—
2008–09	Toronto Marlies	AHL	36	7	9	16	24	6	1	2	3	0
2008–09	Toronto Maple Leafs	NHL	38	1	12	13	20	—	—	—	—	—
2009–10	Columbus Blue Jackets	NHL	73	6	28	34	37	—	—	—	—	—
2010–11	Columbus Blue Jackets	NHL	51	1	17	18	22	—	—	—	—	—
2011–12	New York Rangers	NHL	53	2	16	18	20	20	3	3	6	4
2012–13	New York Rangers	NHL	48	4	3	7	16	10	0	0	0	0
2013–14	New York Rangers	NHL	81	1	12	13	26	25	0	5	5	4
2014–15	Tampa Bay Lightning	NHL	82	9	30	39	26	26	1	8	9	8
2015–16	Tampa Bay Lightning	NHL	73	9	25	34	20	6	1	0	1	2
2016–17	Tampa Bay Lightning	NHL	73	5	17	22	20	—	—	—	—	—
2017–18	Tampa Bay Lightning	NHL	80	4	14	18	18	17	1	4	5	8
2018–19	Tampa Bay Lightning	NHL	47	2	15	17	8	—	—	—	—	—
2019–20	Florida Panthers	NHL	69	5	14	19	14	4	0	0	0	2
2020–21	Florida Panthers	NHL	38	3	6	9	8	5	0	0	0	0
2021–22	Arizona Coyotes	NHL	74	8	15	23	12	—	—	—	—	—
2022–23	Boston Bruins	NHL	8	0	0	0	2	—	—	—	—	—
2022–23	Providence Bruins	AHL	17	0	4	4	0	—	—	—	—	—
2023–24	HV71	SHL	48	2	14	16	10	—	—	—	—	—
SHL totals			146	13	29	42	72	7	1	3	4	10
NHL totals			938	63	230	293	287	112	6	20	26	28

=== International ===
Medal record

Representing Sweden

Ice hockey

World Championships
Gold medal – first place	2017 Germany/France	
Bronze medal – third place	2009 Switzerland	

Year	Team	Event	Result	GP	G	A	Pts	PIM
2005	Sweden	WJC	6th	5	0	0	0	2
2006	Sweden	WJC	5th	6	0	1	1	6
2007	Sweden	WC	4th	9	1	1	2	0
2008	Sweden	WC	4th	8	4	3	7	31
2009	Sweden	WC	3rd place, bronze medalist(s)	7	1	4	5	6
2016	Sweden	WCH	3rd	4	1	1	2	6
2017	Sweden	WC	1st place, gold medalist(s)	10	0	4	4	4
Junior totals				11	0	1	1	8
Senior totals				38	7	13	20	47

== Awards ==
- Elitserien 2005–06 Rookie of the Year nominee in 2006.
