= Undenäs =

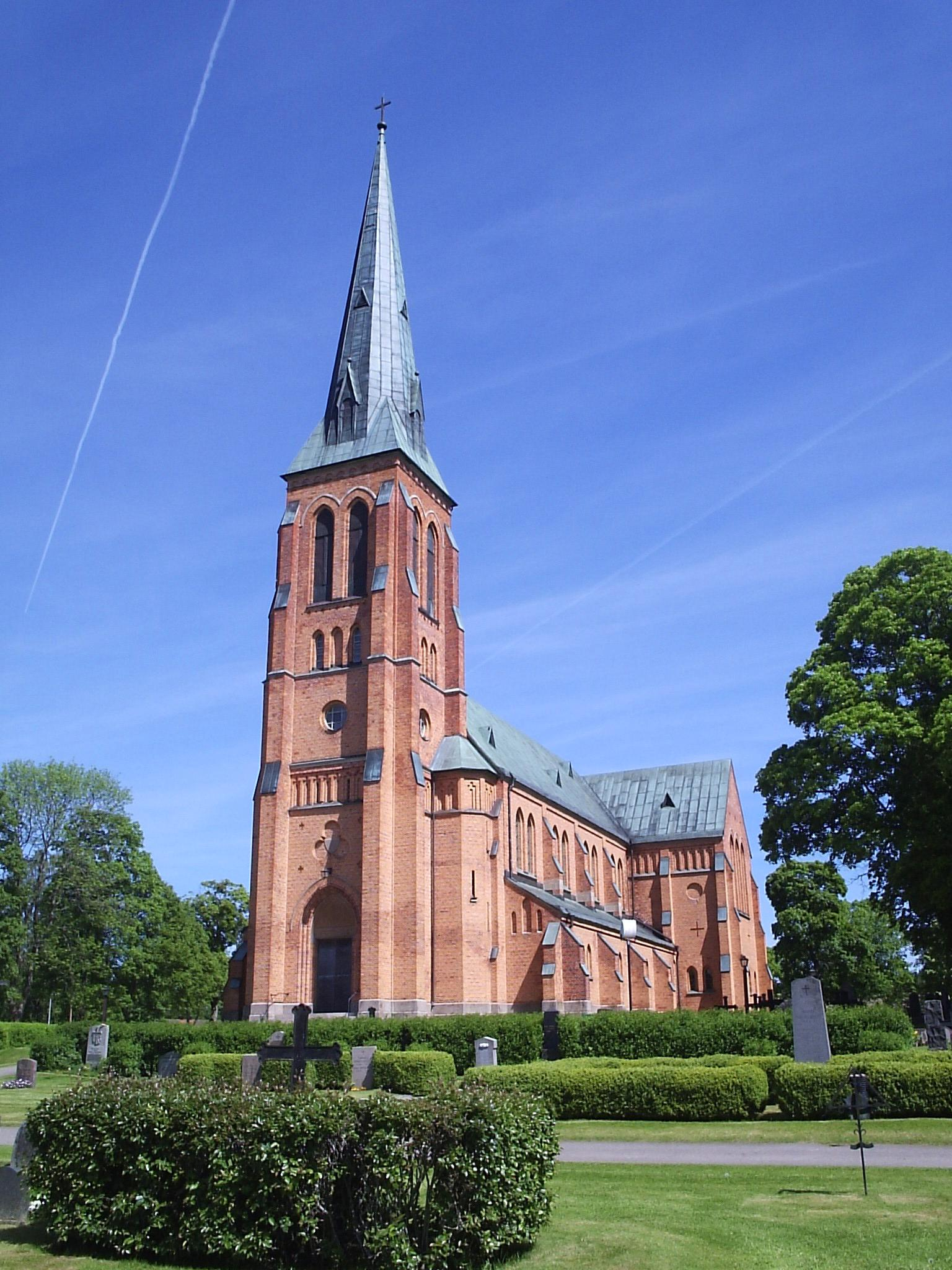

- Location within Västra Götaland Location within Sweden
- Coordinates: 58°39′N 14°25′E
- Country: Sweden
- Province: Västergötland
- County: Västra Götaland County
- Municipality: Karlsborg Municipality

Area
  - Total: 0.61 km^{2} (0.24 sq mi)

Population (31 December 2010)
  - Total: 237
  - Density: 389/km^{2} (1,010/sq mi)
- Time zone: UTC+1 (CET)
  - Summer (DST): UTC+2 (CEST)

Undenäs is a locality in Karlsborg Municipality, Västra Götaland County, Sweden. It had 237 inhabitants in 2010.
