= Mölltorp =

- Location within Västra Götaland Location within Sweden
- Coordinates: 58°30′N 14°24′E
- Country: Sweden
- Province: Västergötland
- County: Västra Götaland County
- Municipality: Karlsborg Municipality

Area
  - Total: 1.30 km^{2} (0.50 sq mi)

Population (31 December 2010)
  - Total: 1,050
  - Density: 808/km^{2} (2,090/sq mi)
- Time zone: UTC+1 (CET)
  - Summer (DST): UTC+2 (CEST)

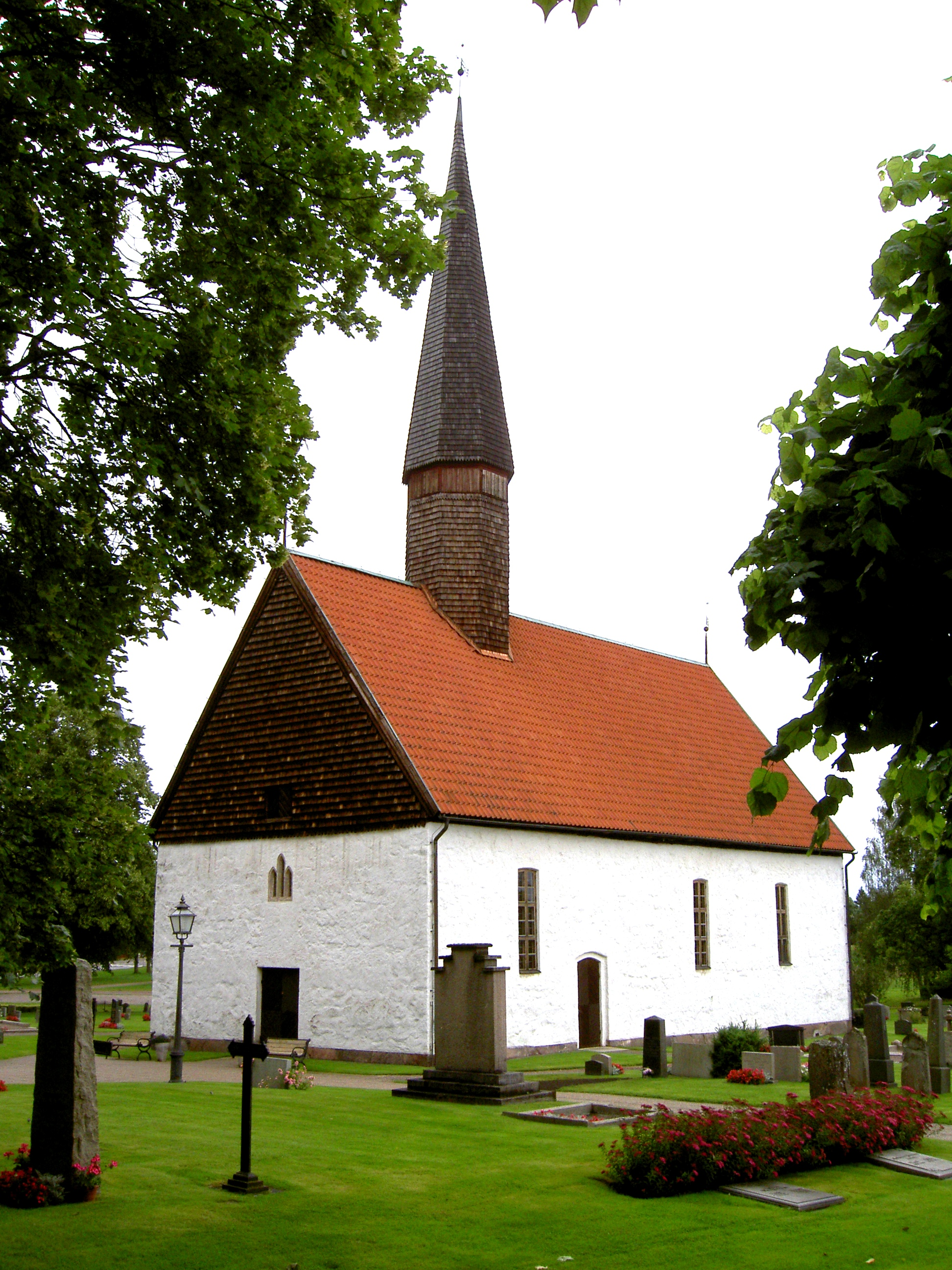
Mölltorp Church

Mölltorp is a locality situated in Karlsborg Municipality, Västra Götaland County, Sweden. It had 1,050 inhabitants in 2010.
