= Tibro AIK =

Swedish football club

Tibro AIK FK
- Full name: Tibro Allmänna Idrottsklubb Fotbollklubb
- Ground: Sportparken Tibro; Tibro; Sweden
- Chairman: Kenneth Eriksson
- Head coach: Alexandros Elia
- Coach: Mats Karlsson; Marko Nurkkala
- League: Division 3
- 2015: Division 2 NorraGötaland, 13th (Relegated)
Home colours

Tibro AIK FK is a Swedish football club located in Tibro in Tibro Municipality, Västra Götaland County.

== Background ==
Since their foundation Tibro AIK FK has participated mainly in the middle and lower divisions of the Swedish football league system. The club currently (2013) plays in Division 2 Norra Götaland which is the fourth tier of Swedish football. They play their home matches at the Sportparken Tibro in Tibro.

Tibro AIK FK are affiliated to the Västergötlands Fotbollförbund.

== Season to season ==
Season	Level	Division	Section	Position	Movements
1993	Tier 5	Division 4	Västergötland Norra	4th	
1994	Tier 5	Division 4	Västergötland Norra	4th	
1995	Tier 5	Division 4	Västergötland Norra	8th	
1996	Tier 5	Division 4	Västergötland Norra	4th	
1997	Tier 5	Division 4	Västergötland Norra	7th	
1998	Tier 5	Division 4	Västergötland Norra	7th	
1999	Tier 5	Division 4	Västergötland Norra	3rd	
2000	Tier 5	Division 4	Västergötland Norra	9th	
2001	Tier 5	Division 4	Västergötland Norra	4th	
2002	Tier 5	Division 4	Västergötland Norra	1st	Promoted
2003	Tier 4	Division 3	Mellersta Götaland	12th	Relegated
2004	Tier 5	Division 4	Västergötland Norra	1st	Promoted
2005	Tier 4	Division 3	Mellersta Götaland	3rd	Promoted
2006*	Tier 4	Division 2	Mellersta Götaland	8th	
2007	Tier 4	Division 2	Mellersta Götaland	11th	Relegated
2008	Tier 5	Division 3	Mellersta Götaland	2nd	Promotion Playoffs
2009	Tier 5	Division 3	Mellersta Götaland	9th	
2010	Tier 5	Division 3	Mellersta Götaland	1st	Promoted
2011	Tier 4	Division 2	Norra Götaland	4th	
2012	Tier 4	Division 2	Västra Götaland	7th	
2013	Tier 4	Division 2	Norra Götaland		

* League restructuring in 2006 resulted in a new division being created at Tier 3 and subsequent divisions dropping a level.

== Attendances ==
In recent seasons Tibro AIK FK have had the following average attendances:

Season	Average attendance	Division / Section	Level
2005	189	Div 3 Mellersta Götaland	Tier 4
2006	230	Div 2 Mellersta Götaland	Tier 4
2007	142	Div 2 Mellersta Götaland	Tier 4
2008	149	Div 3 Mellersta Götaland	Tier 5
2009	179	Div 3 Mellersta Götaland	Tier 5
2010	210	Div 3 Mellersta Götaland	Tier 5

* Attendances are provided in the Publikliga sections of the Svenska Fotbollförbundet website.
