= Karlsborg Municipality =

Karlsborg Municipality Karlsborgs kommun
- Municipality
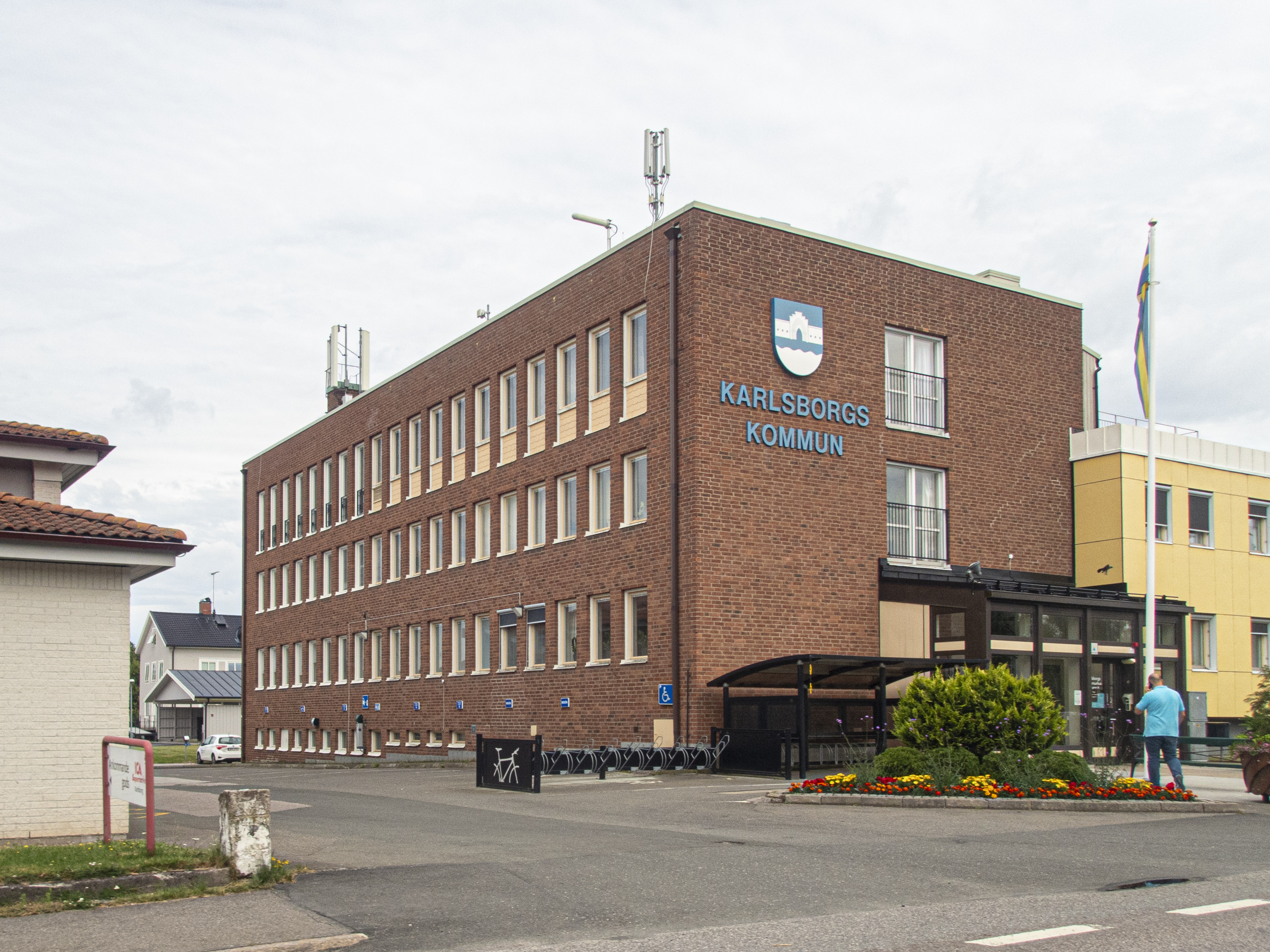
- Karlsborg town hall

- Coat of arms

- Coordinates: 58°32′N 14°31′E
- Country: Sweden
- County: Västra Götaland County
- Seat: Karlsborg

Area
  - Total: 797.35 km^{2} (307.86 sq mi)
  - Land: 405.87 km^{2} (156.71 sq mi)
  - Water: 391.48 km^{2} (151.15 sq mi)
- Area as of 1 January 2014.

Population (30 June 2025)
  - Total: 7,017
  - Density: 17.29/km^{2} (44.78/sq mi)
- Time zone: UTC+1 (CET)
  - Summer (DST): UTC+2 (CEST)
- ISO 3166 code: SE
- Province: Västergötland
- Municipal code: 1446
- Website: www.karlsborg.se

Karlsborg Municipality (Swedish: Karlsborgs kommun) is a municipality in Västra Götaland County in western Sweden. Its seat is located in the town of Karlsborg.

The present municipality was formed in 1971 when "old" Karlsborg was amalgamated with Mölltorp and Undenäs.

The area has been dominated by Karlsborg Fortress and military activity throughout the last centuries.

Tiveden National Park is partly situated within the municipality. The Flugebyn airfield, home of the Västergötland Skydiving Club (Västergötlands Fallskärmsklubb) also lies in the municipality.

== Demographics ==
This is a demographic table based on Karlsborg Municipality's electoral districts in the 2022 Swedish general election sourced from SVT's election platform, in turn taken from SCB official statistics.

In total there were 6,959 residents, including 5,557 Swedish citizens of voting age. 43.3% voted for the left coalition and 55.8% for the right coalition. Indicators are in percentage points except population totals and income.

Location	Residents	Citizen adults	Left vote	Right vote	Employed	Swedish parents	Foreign heritage	Income SEK	Degree
Location			%	%					
Karlsborg C-S	2,057	1,657	40.4	58.4	79	88	12	23,542	38
Karlsborg N	2,068	1,641	44.0	55.1	84	91	9	25,703	35
Mölltorp-Brevik	1,832	1,443	46.0	53.5	81	91	9	25,897	34
Undenäs-Forsvik	1,002	816	45.4	53.5	77	88	12	21,277	29
Source: SVT
